= Jimena Sánchez (queen) =

Jimena Sánchez (also spelled Ximena) was an infanta of Pamplona and queen of León (1035–1037). She was the daughter of King Sancho III of Pamplona, who probably arranged her marriage to King Vermudo III of León as part of a peace settlement. She was still living in 1062, possibly as a nun.

Her short time as queen to the last king of the Astur-Leonese dynasty assured that by the 13th century she was forgotten, with chroniclers from then onward assigning Vermudo III a queen named Theresa.

== Life ==
Jimena was the daughter of King Sancho III the Great, king of Pamplona and Nájera, and Queen Muniadona. She was their youngest child, probably born around 1018–1020 and named for her paternal grandmother, Jimena Fernández. In a genealogy from the monastery of Leire dated 1074, she is the last of Sancho's children listed, after her four brothers and her sister Mayor.

In 1035, Sancho arranged the marriage of Jimena to King Vermudo III of León, who was about the same age or slightly older. Their marriage took place sometime between 2 February, when Sancho was still reigning in León, which he had conquered the previous year, and 17 February, when Vermudo, restored to power, was reigning with Jimena as queen. Perhaps as part of the same peace agreement between Sancho and Vermudo, Sancho's son Ferdinand was to be married to Vermudo's sister, Sancha, although this marriage did not take place until later.

On 17 February 1035, Vermudo and Jimena issued a diploma defining the boundaries of the diocese of Palencia, which her father had restored. They also dedicated the new cathedral of Palencia to the Virgin Mary and Saint Antoninus, inciting a wave of devotion to this saint in León.

A 16th-century copy of the charter of 9 June 1037. A red arrow points to the line Scemena Regina manu mea conf[irmans] = "Queen Jimena, my own hand confirming".

According to the 13th-century historian Lucas de Tuy, Jimena and Vermudo had one son, Alfonso Vermúdez, who died after only a few days. In 1036, she was a witness with her husband when her grandmother and namesake made a donation to the cathedral of Santiago de Compostela. She signed the royal diplomas of 20 January 1036 and 9 June 1037, the latter during a trip to Galicia. She was widowed on 4 September 1037 when her husband was killed in the battle of Tamarón.

In a document that should probably be dated to 1044, she is named as tenant-in-chief of the abbey of San Andrés de Vega de Espinareda. She appears in a document of 23 May 1057. She was still living on 21 December 1062 or 1063, when she signed a document recording a donation to León Cathedral made by Ferdinand and Sancha. She is described as devota, which may indicate that she had become a nun. Two days later, she signed as a witness when her brother granted the monastery of Santa Marta de Tera to the diocese of Astorga. She was the last surviving child of Sancho III and the only one who may have outlived her mother. Muniadona died in 1066, but the date of Jimena's death is unknown.

== Tomb and mistaken identity ==
Jimena was buried in the royal pantheon in the basilica of San Isidoro de León. The earliest reference to her tomb there is found in the writings of the 12th-century bishop Pelagius of Oviedo. In the 18th century, Enrique Flórez wrote a description of her tomb effigy. It depicted her in full wearing a royal mantle, crowned, with a cross in her left hand and a fleur-de-lis in her right, which Flórez interpreted as representing the top of a sceptre rather than any connection to France. Rocío Sánchez Ameijeiras interprets the cross as the crucifix of Ferdinand and Sancha, a processional cross owned by San Isidoro.

There were two epitaphs on the tomb, an earlier one in verse and a later one in prose. Neither is contemporary with her bural, but were added much later. They both erroneously call her the daughter of a count named Sancho, with the verse epitaph specifying that he was Count Sancho García of Castile. The verse epitaph also gives the day of her death as 23 November. Only a fragment of her tomb remains today.

The 13th-century historians Lucas de Tuy and Rodrigo Jiménez de Rada repeat the error on her tomb slab, calling her the daughter of Count Sancho, but they compound the mistake by giving her name as Teresa. Their error is repeated in the epitaph of Sancho García's wife, Urraca Gómez, in the monastery of San Salvador de Oña. Although some modern scholars took the epitaph and the chronicles at face value, this entails chronological, onomastic and political difficulties. It is highly implausible that she was an otherwise unattested daughter of Count Sancho. Scholars today identify Queen Jimena with the attested daughter of Sancho III. The only document that explicitly identifies them is that of 1062/3, where she is called both queen and sister of Ferdinand. The errors of name and filiation in later sources may stem from the popular romancero tradition, aggravated by Jimena's short time as queen.

== Sources ==
- Simon Barton, "Patrons, Pilgrims and the Cult of Saints in the Medieval Kingdom of León", in Jennie Stopford (ed.), Pilgrimage Explored (York Medieval Press, 1999), pp. 57–77.
- José María Fernández del Pozo, "Jimena Sánchez", Diccionario Biográfico Español (Real Academia de la Historia, 2022).
- Gonzalo Martínez Diez, Sancho III el Mayor (Marcial Pons Historia, 2007).
- Bernard F. Reilly and Simon R. Doubleday, León and Galicia Under Queen Sancha and King Fernando I (University of Pennsylvania Press, 2024).
- Jaime de Salazar y Acha, "Una hija desconocida de Sancho el Mayor, reina de León", Príncipe de Viana, Anejo 8 (1988): 183–192.
- Jaime de Salazar y Acha, Las dinastías reales de España en la Edad Media (Real Academia de la Historia, 2021).
- Rocío Sánchez Ameijeiras, "'The Eventful Life of the Royal Tombs of San Isidoro in León'", in Therese Martin and Julie Harris (eds.), Church, State, Vellum, and Stone: Essays on Medieval Spain in Honor of John Williams (Brill, 2005), pp. 479–520.
- Margarita Torres Sevilla and José Miguel Ortega del Río, Kings of the Grail: Tracing the Historica Journey of the Holy Grail from Jerusalem to Spain (Michael O'Mara Books, 2015).
