= Imperator totius Hispaniae =

Medieval Latin title for the emperor of Spain

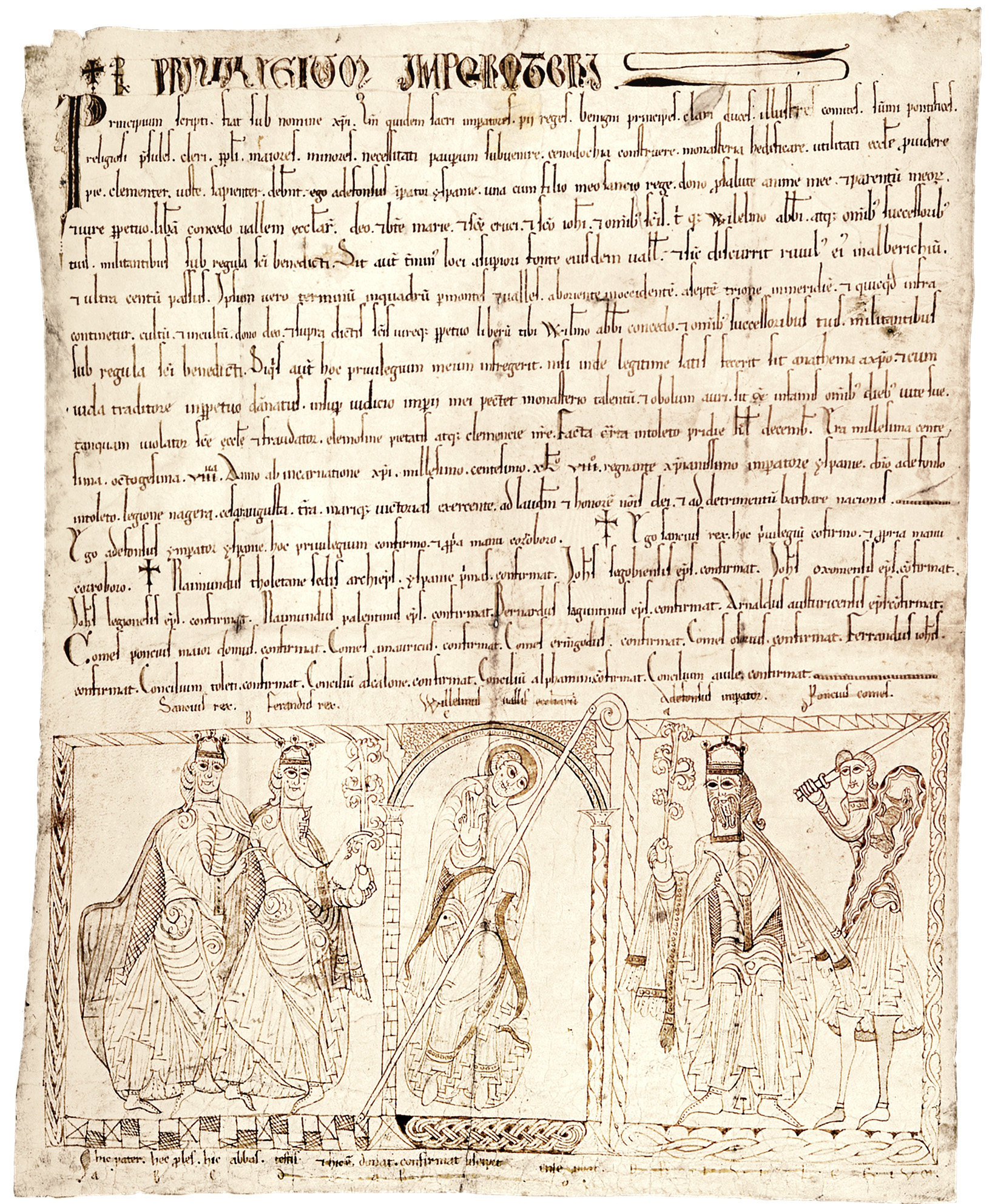
A Privilegium Imperatoris (Imperial Privilege), as it reads at the top, issued by the Emperor Alfonso VII of León and Castile granting land to a certain Abbot William (bottom, centre) for the foundation of a Benedictine monastery. Behind Alfonso (right) is his majordomo, Count Ponce Giraldo de Cabrera, bearing a sword and shield. At bottom left are Alfonso's sons Sancho and Fernando.

Imperator totius Hispaniae is a Latin title meaning "Emperor of All Spain". In Spain in the Middle Ages, the title "emperor" (from Latin imperator) was used under a variety of circumstances from the ninth century onwards, but its usage peaked, as a formal and practical title, between 1086 and 1157. It was primarily used by the kings of León and Castile, but it also found currency in the Kingdom of Navarre and was employed by the counts of Castile and at least one duke of Galicia. It signalled at various points the king's equality with the rulers of the Byzantine Empire and Holy Roman Empire, his rule by conquest or military superiority, his rule over several ethnic or religious groups, and his claim to suzerainty over the other kings of the peninsula, both Christian and Muslim. The use of the imperial title received scant recognition outside of Spain and it had become largely forgotten by the thirteenth century.

The analogous feminine title, "empress" (Latin imperatrix), was less frequently used for the consorts of the emperors. Only one reigning queen, Urraca, had occasion to use it, but did so sparingly.

== History ==
=== Kings of Asturias ===
One of the earliest references to the Kingdom of Asturias, predecessor of the Kingdom of León, as an empire (imperium) is in the Chronicle of Alfonso III (881), which says that King Silo (774–83) "subjugated the people of Galicia to his imperial rule" (imperium). The reference is clearly to the rule of the Asturian king over several peoples, namely Asturians, Galicians and Basques.

A surviving charter of 863 refers to Ordoño I as "our lord, residing in the Asturias" (domno nostro Ordonio residente in Asturias), qualifying him as a "commanding prince" (imperante principe). This residential form of title was preferred because the Asturian kingdom at this stage was not ethnically unified or well-defined.

=== Kings of León ===
==== Alfonso III ====
There exist two diplomas dated to the reign of Alfonso III of Asturias and referring to him as emperor, but both are early twelfth-century fabrications emanating from the scriptorium of the Diocese of Mondoñedo and Bishop Gonzalo, designed to bolster that church's claims in a dispute of 1102. The first document, dated to 866 or 867, confirmed by Alfonso, who signs as "I, Alfonso, of all Spain emperor, who is unworthily permitted to be called the Catholic". The other refers to him simply as "Alfonso, Emperor of Spain" (Adefonsus Hispaniae imperator). The forger may have borrowed these exalted titles from the chancery of Alfonso VI, who was using the title imperator totius Hispaniae at the time. The subscription lists of both these charters (that is, the list of those who witnessed or confirmed them) are compatible with the dates, and it has been suggested that the clauses referring to Alfonso as emperor are derived from authentic (albeit now lost) charters.

There exists a letter purportedly written by Alfonso III to the clergy of the Cathedral of Tours in 906, wherein the king is arranging to purchase an "imperial crown made of gold and precious stones, fitting to his dignity" (corona imperialis) kept at Tours. Alfonso almost invariably calls himself simply "King Alfonso" (Adefonsus rex) in his surviving charters, but in the letter he uses the elaborate and high-ranking style "Alfonso by the power and assent of Christ king of Spain" (Adefonsus pro Christi nutu at que potentia Hispaniae rex). A similarly grandiose title is given to Alfonso in the contemporary Chronica Prophetica (883): "glorious Alfonso in all the Spains to reign" (gloriosus Adefonsus in omni Spanie regnaturus). The authenticity of the letter is still debated.

Besides the apocryphal charters, there are genuine, posthumous documents referring to Alfonso as emperor. In one that dates from 917, in the reign of his son Ordoño II of León, the king confirms as "Ordoño, son of the Emperor Alfonso the Great" (Ordonius, filius Adephonsi Magni imperatoris). A document from 950 can also be cited that refers to Alfonso with the imperial title. The pertinent passage reads: "They put in place a border with Gonzalo, son of our lord emperor Prince Alfonso".

==== Tenth century ====
A royal diploma of 922, where Ordoño II refers to himself as emperor, is the first recorded instance of a Leonese king doing so. The charter reads, "I, the most serene emperor Ordoño" (Ego serenissimus imperator Ordonius). Ordoño II's successor, Ramiro II (931–51), is not titled "emperor" in any contemporary document, but a charter dated 940 and preserved as a copy in the cartulary of the monastery of Eslonza is dated by "our reigning lord and emperor" (regnante domino et imperatore nostro), the reigning king being Ramiro II. Although he apparently avoided the imperial style himself, his subjects and his successor did not. Private documents of his reign commonly refer to him as the "great king" (rex magnus), as in a document of 930 ("reigning Ramiro, prince and great king in León"). In a private charter from the first year of Ramiro's son Ordoño III (952), the king is called "our reigning lord prince Ordoño, heir of the lord emperor Ramiro" (regnante principe nostro domno Hordonio, prolis domini Ranimiri imperatoris) and the charter was given "at Simancas in the presence of the emperor" (perrexerunt ad Septemanka in presentia imperatoris). In a charter of 954, Ordoño is described as "most lordly emperor, son of Ramiro" (dominisimo imperatori Ranimiro filius).

Contemporary documents of the reign of Ramiro III of León use the magnified titles basileus and magnus rex ("great king"). The former is a Latinisation of the Greek for "king" and was the title employed by the Byzantine Emperors. To western European ears it had an imperial inflection. During the regency of Ramiro's aunt, the nun Elvira Ramírez, the king confirmed a document of 1 May 974 as "Flavius Ramiro, prince, anointed great basileus in the kingdom ... I confirm with my own hand. Elvira, basilea, paternal aunt of the king". The Roman personal name Flavius, which originally meant "blond", was popular among Romanised barbarians, and the kings of the Visigoths took to using it as a Byzantine-sounding title, to give themselves legitimacy. Its use in a document of the tenth century harkens back to Visigothic rule and peninsular unity. A judicial document that emanated from the royal court in 976 refers to a certain royal servant as "in the palace of the most lordly king–emperor ... in obedient service to his most lordly emperor".

==== Eleventh century ====
In the first decades of the eleventh century, the Catalan Abbot Oliba referred to the kings of León, Alfonso V and Bermudo III, as imperatores. Two charters of Sancho Garcés III of Pamplona for the monastic house of San Juan de la Peña, both erroneously dated to 1025, use the same dating clause identify Bermudo III as "emperor in Galicia". It is not clear what the imperial title means in this charter, which appears to have been issued before Sancho's conquest of the city of León, when Bermudo was reduced to ruling Galicia, for the conquest came in 1034 and the charter was drawn between Bermudo's accession in 1028 and the death of Duke Sancho VI of Gascony on 4 October 1032. There exists a charter of 1036 issued by Ramiro I of Aragon, which lists the sovereigns then reigning in Spain thus: "Emperor Bermudo in León, and Count Ferdinand in Castile, and King García in Pamplona, and King Ramiro in Aragon, and King Gonzalo in Ribagorza".

=== Rulers of León and Castile ===
==== Ferdinand I ====
Upon the death of his elder brother García Sánchez III of Navarre in 1054, Ferdinand I of Castile and León gained a position of preeminence among the Christian kings of Iberia. He was first called "emperor" by the notaries employed by his half-brother, Ramiro I of Aragon, the same ones who in 1036 called Ferdinand's predecessor Bermudo III "emperor". In a royal Aragonese charter of that same year, before Ferdinand had even defeated Bermudo and taken his kingdom at the Battle of Tamarón, Ramiro refers to his brother as "emperor in Castile and in León and in Astorga". A similarly-worded charter was issued in 1041 and again in 1061, where the order of kingdoms is reversed and Astorga ignored: "emperor in León and in Castile".

Ferdinand is sometimes said to have had himself crowned "Emperor of Spain" in 1056, but this is based only on the first use of the imperial style in a charter of his own, preserved in the cartulary of Arlanza: "under the rule of the emperor King Ferdinand and the empress Queen Sancha ruling the kingdom in León and in Galicia as well as in Castile" (sub imperio imperatoris Fredinandi regis et Sancie regine imperatrice regnum regentes in Legione et in Gallecia vel in Castella). This title was only used on one other occasion during his reign. A document of 1058 dates itself "in the time of the most serene prince Lord Ferdinand and his consort Queen Sancha" (in tempore serenissimi principis domni Fredinandi et ejus conjugis Sanciae reginae) and later qualifies him as "this emperor, the aforesaid Ferdinand" (perrexerunt ad ipsum imperatorem jam dictum Fredenandum). The Chronicon complutense, probably written shortly after Ferdinand's death, extols him as the "exceedingly strong emperor" (imperator fortissimus) when mentioning the Siege of Coimbra.

After Ferdinand's death in 1065, his children took to calling him "emperor". In 1072, Alfonso VI, Fedinand's second son, referred to himself as "offspring of the Emperor Ferdinand". Two years later (1074), Urraca of Zamora and Elvira of Toro referred to themselves as "daughters of the Emperor Ferdinand the Great". In a later charter of 1087, Ferdinand is referred to first as "king", then as "great emperor", and finally just as "emperor" alongside his consort, who is first called "queen" then "empress". Sancha's epigraph at the Basilica of San Isidoro calls her "Queen of all Hispania" ("Regina totius Hispaniæ").

In the fourteenth century a story appeared in various chronicles according to which the Pope, the Holy Roman Emperor, and the King of France demanded a tribute from Ferdinand I. In certain versions the Pope is named Urban (although it could not have been either Urban I or Urban II) and in other versions Victor (which is plausibly identifiable with Victor II). According to this late account, the king was prepared to pay, but the Cid (who in reality was a young and very minor figure during Ferdinand's reign) declared war on Pope, Emperor and Frenchman, who rescinded their demand. For this reason "Don Ferdinand was afterwards called ‘the Great’: the peer of an emperor". In the sixteenth century this account re-appeared, extended and elaborated, in its most complete form in the Jesuit historian Juan de Mariana. He wrote that in 1055 at the Council of Florence, the Emperor Henry III urged Victor II to prohibit under severe penalties the use of the imperial title by Ferdinand of León. This story is generally regarded as apocryphal, although some modern authors have accepted it uncritically or seen a kernel of historical truth in it. Spanish historian A. Ballesteros argued that Ferdinand adopted the title in opposition to Henry III's imperial pretensions. German historian E. E. Stengel believed the version found in Mariana on the grounds that the latter probably used the now lost acts of the Council of Florence. Juan Beneyto Pérez was willing to accept it as based on tradition and Ernst Steindorff, the nineteenth-century student of the reign of Henry III, as being authentically transmitted via the romancero. Menéndez Pidal accepted the account of Mariana, but placed it in the year 1065.

==== Alfonso VI ====
Ferdinand I divided his lands between his sons. The Historia Roderici calls his second son, Sancho II of León and Castile, rex tocius Castelle et dominator Hyspaniae ("king of all Castile and dominator of Spain"). His youngest son, García, was only posthumously called "emperor" on account of his feats in battle. His second son, Alfonso VI, survived both brothers and, with García in prison, was ruling all of his father's realms by 1072. He was the first Spanish ruler to consistently style himself "emperor" (imperator). Before 1079 he also used the titles "King of Spain" (rex Hispaniae) or "King of all Spain" (rex totius Hispaniae).

===== Origins =====
The first use of the imperial title by Alfonso VI comes from a diploma of 1075, where he is called simply imperator, although he subscribed the charter with the title rex (king).

The earliest use of the imperial title by Alfonso VI that comes down to us is found in a royal charter issued 17 October 1077, but preserved only as a copy. The same notary who wrote up this charter also wrote up a private charter the original of which survives, dated 29 January 1078 and confirmed by Alfonso VI as emperor. The earliest original royal charter to use the imperial style dates to 7 April 1079. The timing of the adoption of the imperial style suggests that it may have been in response to claims by Pope Gregory VII to suzerainty over the whole Iberian peninsula. A papal letter written 28 June 1077 could not have been received by Alfonso more than twelve weeks before the date of the first known usage of the title "emperor" by him. This letter was addressed to the "kings, counts, and other princes of Spain" (regibus, comitibus, ceterisque principibus Hyspaniae), an indication that Gregory did not regard Alfonso as unique among Spanish rulers. The term "Kingdom of Spain" was employed in this letter to refer to the Christian part of the peninsula and not to Alfonso's kingdom in particular, since the legates Gregory said he was sending there never even entered the latter.

Gregory had perhaps been inspired by his victory over the Holy Roman Emperor Henry IV in the Walk to Canossa that year. In his letter he promised to send two legates to Spain, Bishop Amadeus of Olorón and Abbot Frotard of Saint-Pons-de-Thomiéres. It is certain that these legates never entered Alfonso's kingdom, although they were in Catalonia in late 1077 and early 1078, and that the king and his ally, Abbot Hugh I of Cluny, requested another legate. In a papal letter dated 7 May 1078 Gregory confirmed that he was sending Cardinal Richard to Castile "as the King of Spain has asked and your counsel has desired" (sicut rex Hispaniae rogavit et vos consilium dedistis). Alfonso had already been described as "King of the Spains" (Hispaniarum rex) in a letter to Hugh of Cluny on 10 July 1077.

Other possible incentives for Alfonso to stress his hegemony over the Iberian peninsula include the submission of most of the taifas (Islamic factional kingdoms) to his suzerainty by the payment of parias (tribute) by 1073, and the annexation of La Rioja and those parts of Castile belonging to Navarre after the assassination of Sancho Garcés IV in 1076.

===== Imperator totius Hispaniae =====
The Iberian peninsular in 1086 (Alfonso's realm in magenta)

Beginning in 1077 Alfonso instituted the use of the style ego Adefonsus imperator totius Hispaniae ("I, Alfonso, emperor of all Spain") and its use soon became regular. This title was used throughout the period 1079–81, which represents the peak of his imperial pretensions before his capture of the city of Toledo, ancient capital of the Visigoths. In 1080 he introduced the form ego Adefonsus Hispaniarum imperator ("I, Alfonso, emperor of the Spains"), which he used again in 1090. His most elaborate imperial title was ego Adefonsus imperator totius Castelle et Toleto necnon et Nazare seu Alave ("I, Alfonso, emperor of all Castile and of Toledo also and of Nájera, or Álava").

The charter of consecration of the Cathedral of Toledo on 18 December 1086, a feast day of the Virgin Mary, is the most copied eleventh-century charter from Spain. The charter is a pseudo-original: a close copy of the original, which was drawn up by the notary Sisnandus Astruariz, with some embellishments, such as the intitulario of Alfonso VI, who is called Esperie imperator ("emperor of Hesperia", meaning "the west", an archaic name for the Iberian peninsula) as opposed to the expected Ispanie imperator.

Alfonso seems to have regarded his conquest of Toledo in 1085/6 as having given him dominion over the other kingdoms of Spain, both Christian and Muslim. On four occasions after that date (1087, 1088, 1093, and 1099) he styled himself "I, Alfonso, constituted above all the Spains emperor" (ego, Adefonsus, constitutus super omnes Spanie imperator). Several times he explicitly referred to his rule of Toledo in an imperial styling:

- 1088: "I, Alfonso, of all the empire of Spain and kingdom of Toledo" (ego Adefonsus totius imperii Hispaniae et Toleti regni)
- 1096, 1099, and 1100 (four times total): "I, Alfonso, magnificent conqueror of the empire of Toledo" (ego Adefonsus Toletani imperii magnificus triunphator)
- 1097 and 1099: "I, Alfonso, by the grace of God Toledan emperor" (ego Adefonsus Dei gratia Toletanus imperator)

Contemporary private charters also use the imperial title, with variants of "emperor of all Spain" and "emperor of Toledo" both appearing. Twice, in 1098 and 1104, the elaborate dating clause "the king Don Alfonso reigning in Toledo and ruling (imperante) the Christians and the Pagans in all the kingdoms of Spain" is used. The Historia silense, written shortly after his reign in the ambit of the Leonese royal court, refers to Alfonso twice as the "orthodox Spanish emperor" (ortodoxus Yspanus imperator).

Alfonso's imperial title was recognised outside of his kingdom. In 1078, a document from the Diocese of Roda in Aragon, names as the most powerful rulers in Christendom "Henry, ruling (imperante) the Romans; Philip, the Franks; [and] Alfonso, the Spaniards", a possible allusion to Alfonso's imperial rank. On at least four occasions in his dating clauses (1081, 1086, 1092, and 1093), Sancho Ramírez, ruler of Aragon and Pamplona, referred to Alfonso VI as imperatore domino Adefonso ("the lord emperor Alfonso") ruling either in Legione ("in León") or in Leone et in Castella atque in Toleto ("in León and in Castile and also in Toledo"). In the clause of 1086 and also in dating clauses of the Aragonese king for 1087, 1089, 1090, and 1093 wherein Alfonso's only title is rex (king), the Leonese king is named before the king whose charter it is, a clear indication that Sancho recognised an order of precedence or hierarchy which placed Alfonso at the top. Sancho's brother, García Ramírez, Bishop of Jaca, was perhaps too keenly aware of the reality of this hierarchy, for Sancho eventually came to suspect that his brother was planning to hand over Alquézar to Alfonso, "to subvert the kingdom of his brother and exalt the empire of Alfonso" in the words of a contemporary charter. According to the Islamic historian Ibn Khaldun, Alfonso VI "used the title of emperor, that is to say, king of kings".

Alfonso was also the first Spanish monarch to use the term imperium to refer to an empire, the territory under the rule of an emperor, rather than as a synonym for power or authority. A royal diploma of 1084 refers to his having "convoked the bishops and abbots and also primates of my empire" for a synod. From 1088 there is also a direct reference to the "whole empire of Spain and kingdom of Toledo". Besides these there are the four contemporary references to Alfonso as Toletani imperii magnificus triunphator ("magnificent conqueror of the empire of Toledo") and the reference by Sancho Ramírez to the plot of his brother the bishop to favour the "empire of Alfonso" (Anfusi imperium).

Alfonso VI's son and heir, Sancho Alfónsez, is known in one interpolated and therefore inaccurate charter, dated 12 January 1102, as "Sancho son of the emperor" (Sancius filius Imperator).

===== Emperor of the Two Religions =====
There is some controversy over Alfonso's use of the title "Emperor of the Two Religions" (al-Imbraţūr dhī-l-Millatayn), which appears in a surviving letter he sent to King al-Mu‘tamid ibn Abbād of Seville. The two letters exchanged between the two kings in 1085 are preserved only in Arabic in the text of the fourteenth-century chronicle Al-Ḥulal al-Mawšiyya fi Ḍikr al-Ajbār al-Marrākušiyya. Most modern historians, such as Ambrosio Huici Miranda and Bernard F. Reilly, have questioned the authenticity of all the documents incorporated into this chronicle. Menéndez Pidal accepted their authenticity in his study of Alfonso's imperial title, and beginning in the late 1970s a debate opened up between medievalist Angus Mackay and orientalist Muhammad Benaboud on the one hand, arguing for their trustworthiness, and Hebraicist Norman Roth on the other, arguing against it.

==== Urraca ====
After the death of her husband, Duke Raymond of Galicia, and before the death of her father, the Emperor Alfonso VI, Urraca, in her capacity as ruler of Galicia styled herself "Empress of all Galicia" (tocius Gallecie imperatrix) in a charter of donation to the Diocese of Lugo dated 21 January 1108 and made "for [the benefit of] the soul of my [late] husband [lit. man] the most glorious Lord Duke Raymond" (pro anima viri mei gloriosissimi ducis domni Ramundi). Raymond had styled himself "Emperor of Galicia" (Gallecie imperator) on 17 March 1107, and the meaning of the title in this case is not clear. It is probable that Urraca's right to succeed Raymond was confirmed at a meeting of the royal court in León in December 1107 and that it was this which led her to briefly adopt the imperial style. There is an "altogether peculiar" charter surviving in a fifteenth-century copy, purportedly issued by Raymond of Galicia at Sahagún and dated, probably erroneously, to 1 April 1101. It refers to an "imperial army" (exercitatus imperatorum) under Raymond's command probably left to guard the Tagus valley during Alfonso VI's campaign against Valencia.

Two charters of 1112 refer to Queen Urraca as "empress" (imperatrix), including an original of 18 May. All the uses of this title by the queen come early in her reign, and perhaps formed "a conscious device to offset the authority of her ‘imperial’ husband", Alfonso the Battler, who was at the height of his power in the "dark days" of 1112. One of Urraca's most prolific known notaries, Martín Peláez, with fifteen surviving charters, three original, to his name, occasionally paired the title "chancellor" (cancellarius) for himself with that of "empress" for his sovereign. The use of a more dignified title than "notary" (notarius) may have been designed to buttress the use of the imperial title, which was probably considered excessively masculine, even in comparison to Urraca's regal powers. A charter of 6 September 1110 referring to Urraca as "queen and empress" (regina et imperatrix) and drawn up by a scribe named Petrus Vincentii is probably a falsification. There is another suspect charter, dating to 28 October 1114, while Urraca was wintering at Palencia with her court and Count Bertrán de Risnel, probably an ambassador from her husband's court. On that day she made a donation to the see of Palencia in which she appears with the title "Empress of all Spain" (totius hispaniae imperatrix), an exact feminine analogue of her father's usual lofty title, although this diploma survives only as a copy.

Although her use of the imperial styling was limited, much more so than that of her male predecessor and successor, Urraca did employ the title "Queen of Spain" on several occasions from the very beginning of her reign until the end. It is possible that the imperial style had connotations too strongly masculine, making a royal title equivalent in its claim of overarching sovereignty preferable. Her first act as queen, dated 22 July 1109, the day after her father's burial, was to confirm the privileges of the church of León. She signed the document as "Urraca by the pleasure of God queen of all Spain". On 26 June 1110, on the other side of her realm, Urraca issued a diploma to Diego López I de Haro of the Rioja, signing as "Queen of Spain" (Ispanie regina) and without mentioning her husband, who was then in Galicia.

==== Alfonso VII ====
Alfonso VI's successors, his daughter Urraca and her second husband Alfonso the Battler, used the imperial title only sporadically. Beginning in 1127 Urraca's son by her first husband, Alfonso VII of León and Castile used the title of his namesake grandfather frequently, and in 1135 he had himself crowned as emperor in León: he was the only Spanish imperator to have himself crowned as such and the last Spanish monarch to consistently employ the imperial style.

Alfonso used the title "emperor" on several occasions after his first coronation in 1111 (in Santiago de Compostela, as the candidate of a regional faction opposed to his mother) and before his mother's death in 1126: in 1117, 1118, 1124, 1125 and 1126. The first known occurrence of the title is a charter of 9 December 1117 issued at Sahagún, which was confirmed by the Archbishop of Toledo, Bernard, five bishops, and the most powerful lay nobles of the kingdom: Pedro Fróilaz de Traba, Froila Díaz, and Pedro Ansúrez.

The general use of the imperial title by Alfonso did not begin until after Urraca's death. The contemporary, anonymous account of his reign, the Chronica Adefonsi imperatoris ("Chronicle of Alfonso the Emperor"), consistently refers to him as "king" (rex) when recounting events prior to 1135 and always "emperor" (imperator) thereafter. In various documents, Alfonso VII had himself called "triumphant and ever undefeated" (triumphator et semper invictus), recalling Alfonso VI's use of a similar title in connexion with the imperial style. Generally Alfonso VII's use of the imperial title is distinct form that of his predecessors in having a clear juridical and hierarchical meaning (at least in his own eyes and probably those of his subjects). The Chronica Adefonsi describes the recognition Alfonso received at the assembly in León in 1135 as being due to his superiority over his neighbours:

. . . ut vocarent regem imperatorem, pro eo quod rex Garsias, et rex Zafadola sarracenorum, et comes Raymundus barcinonensium, et comes Adefonsus tolosanus, et multi comites et duces Gasconiae et Franciae in omnibus essent obedientes ei.

. . . therefore they called the king [Alfonso VII] “emperor”, since King García [of Navarre], and King Sayf al-Daula of the Saracens, and Count Raymond [Berengar IV] of the Barcelonans, and Count Alfonso [Jordan] the Toulousain, and many counts and dukes of Gascony and France were in all things obedient to him [Alfonso VII].

Unlike the contemporary Holy Roman Emperors, Alfonso VII was not anointed prior to his imperial coronation, although he had been anointed for his royal coronation. The Estoria de España composed under the direction of Sancho IV of Castile in the thirteenth century claims that Alfonso's coronation as emperor was affirmed by Pope Innocent II upon request, but no Papal documents from Alfonso's reign refer to him as anything other than rex (king). A closer source, the contemporary Annales cameracenses, written by Lambert of Waterlos (died c.1170), do suggest wider European recognition of Alfonso's imperial stature. Under the year 1159 they refer to "our emperor" (the Holy Roman Emperor, Frederick I), the "Constantinopolitan emperor" (the Byzantine Emperor, Manuel I), and the "emperor of Galicia", that is, Alfonso VII.

Alfonso VII's usual title from 1136 on was simply "Emperor Alfonso" with a list of those regions he presumed to rule: e.g., "ruling in Toledo, León, Zaragoza, Nájera, Castile, and Galicia [as well as Barcelona and Provence as far as Mont Cenis]". He sometimes mentioned the Muslims territories he had re-conquered: in 1143 he ruled in Corduba (Córdoba), in 1151 in Baetia et Almariae (Baeza and Almería), and in 1156 in Baecie, Anduiar et Almarie (Baeza, Andújar, and Almería).

Alfonso VII made his acclamation and coronation in 1135 to appear spontaneous, probably a conscious likening to that of Charlemagne in 800. Contemporary sources both within and without the Iberian peninsula compare Alfonso favourably as "another Julius Caesar, a second Charlemagne [because of his successful campaigns against the Moors]". Herman of Laon (Hermannus monachus, "Herman the monk"), writing in his De miraculis sanctae Mariae Laudunensis de gestis venerabilis Bartholomaei episcopi et sancti Nortberti libri tres ("Three Books on the Miracles of Saint Mary of Lyon, on the Deeds of the Venerable Bishop Bartholomew, and on Saint Norbert"), notes that:

Totaque pene Hispania sibi subjugata adeo nominis sui opinionem dilatavit ut ab aliis alter Julius, ab aliis secundus Carolus vocaretur, ob memoriam illius praeclari Caroli Francorum regis, qui quondam Hispaniam victor subegit.

Having subdued almost all of Spain, he increased his fame to the point that he was called by some "the second Julius" and by others "the second Charles" in memory of the illustrious [Charlemagne], king of the Franks, who, once victorious, subdued Spain.

Lines 18–21 of the Poem of Almería, a fragmentary epic appendix to the Chronica Adefonsi celebrating Alfonso's conquest of Almería, also connects his imperial title to his following in Charlemagne's footsteps:

Hic Adefonsus erat, nomen tenet imperatoris. Facta sequens Caroli, cui competit equiparari Gente fuere pares, armorum vi coequales.	Alfonso, he who bears the title of Emperor. Emulating the deeds of Charlemagne, with whom it is right to compare him, Alfonso was equal in rank and like him in military valour.

In the autumn of 1154 Louis VII of France and his wife Constance, a daughter of Alfonso VII, took the Way of Saint James and visited the realms of his father-in-law. Impressed by Alfonso's imperial title, on his return trip he issued a charter in which he refers to himself in the address as "ordained by the Providence of God the August Emperor of the Franks" (dei ordinante providentia Francorum Imperator Augustus) at Arzacq on Wednesday 9 February 1155. In the subscription clause he refers to himself merely as "the most serene king of the Franks" (serenissimi Regis francorum). This act, in favour of the Diocese of Maguelonne, does not survive in its original, but in two notarised copies made at Montpellier on 6 February 1311, now both in the national archives.

==== Divided realm ====
Alfonso VII's empire was divided on his death in 1157 between his sons, Sancho III receiving Castile and Ferdinand II receiving León. It remained divided until 1230. In this period, the imperial title fell into abeyance.

One private charter from 1157 is dated to the reign of "King-Emperor Sancho, reigning in Toledo and in all of Castile" (regnante rege imperatore Sancio in Toleto et in tota Castella). Sancho III died in 1158 and was succeeded by his son, Alfonso VIII, who was a small child. Ferdinand took the opportunity of his nephew's minority to assert his dominance, using the title "king of the Spanish" (rex Hispanorum) from 1163 until 1164 and then "king of the Spains" (rex Hispaniarum) from 1165 until 1175. He did not explicitly take an imperial title, but his choice of title demonstrates that the "imperial idea" was still alive at León after Alfonso VII.

The imperial title was also associated with Alfonso VIII by writers north of the Pyrenees. The troubadour Peire Vidal in his poem Mout es bona terr'Espanha refers to Alfonso as the "king-emperor" (reis emperaires) and his kingdom as "the imperial region" (l'emperial reyo). The troubadours Perdigon and Arnaut Peire d'Agange also refers to Alfonso as emperor.

==== Empresses consort ====
Besides the case of Elvira Ramírez, regent of Ramiro III of León, who was styled bassilea once during her lifetime, the title imperatrix (empress) was occasionally used for the consorts of those men who were styled imperator.

Sancha of León, daughter of Alfonso V and wife of Ferdinand I, was styled empress in the first of the two charters issued by her husband during his reign in which he called himself emperor. This one, dated 1056, is preserved in the cartulary of Arlanza and the relevant text reads: "under the rule of the emperor King Ferdinand and the queen-empress Sancha ruling [plural] the kingdom in León and in Galicia as well as in Castile" (sub imperio imperatoris Fredinandi regis et Sancie regine imperatrice regnum regentes in Legione et in Gallecia vel in Castella). The historian Charles Bishko continually refers to Sancha as "queen-empress" on the basis of this charter. In 1087, long after the deaths of Ferdinand (1065) and Sancha (1067), their eldest daughter, Urraca, referred to herself as "daughter of that king and emperor Ferdinand and Empress Sancha" (filia ejusdem regis et imperatoris Federnandi et Sancie imperatricis).

The fourth wife of Alfonso VI, Isabel (Elizabeth), probably of French or Burgundian origin, appears in contemporary charters as his "empress". On 14 May 1100 Alfonso issued his first act with her at his side: "with the will and assent of my consort the Empress Isabel ... on the road to Valencia where I was going to lead the Christians of that place".

In a document of 29 November 1152, Sancha Raimúndez, who herself was titled "queen" as an honorific granted by her brother, Alfonso VII, refers to his spouse Richeza as empress: Domina Rica imperatrix et uxor domini ... imperatoris.

=== Alfonso the Battler ===
Alfonso the Battler used the imperial title after his marriage to Queen Urraca in 1109. According to later sources he ceased using it after her death in 1126. The Chronicle of San Juan de la Peña writes that after Alfonso VII's accession "he [Alfonso the Battler] did not wish to be called ‘emperor’, but rather king of Aragon, Pamplona and Navarre." This has been much repeated by subsequent historians. Despite this, charters survive from late in his reign (1130 and 1132) which show him still using the imperial style without reference to Castile or León, which he had ruled jure uxoris (in right of his wife). The text of a charter erroneously dated 1115 but actually belonging to 1130 reads: "king and emperor in Aragon and in Pamplona, in Sobrarbe and in Ribagorza".

A forgery dated 3 April 1108, before even his marriage to Urraca, titles Alfonso "emperor in Castile [and] Galicia" (imperator in Castella, Gallicia). A genuine charter dating to August 1115 refers to him as imperator ruling in Toledo and Castile.

=== Kings of Navarre ===
==== Sancho I ====
The imperial title is found in the section of the Códice de Roda conventionally called the "Genealogies of Roda" (Genealogías de Roda), where Sancho Garcés I of Pamplona (905–25) is named "excellent emperor Sancho Garcés". This manuscript is thought to date from the late tenth century and may not reflect contemporary usage. Likewise, it appears to derive from an Iberian Arabic original, and the imperial title may be an imprecise representation of some Arabic title such as Caliph. The "Genealogies" also refer to Sancho Garcés's daughter as "Sancha, wife of Emperor Ordoño of León", referring to Ordoño II, whose third and final wife she was. In the Codex the other kings of León are simply styled "kings" (regis), although Ordoño II's successor, Ramiro II, is called "great king" (Ranimirus rex Magnus).

==== Sancho III ====
Regions controlled by Sancho III: Kingdom of Pamplona County of Aragon Lost land in 922 Area linked to Pamplona since the 10th century County of Ribagorza conquered in 1018–1025 Borders regions conquered in 1018–1025 Realm of his son Ferdinand since 1029

In 1034 the city of León was conquered by Sancho III of Pamplona, known as "the Great". The imperial pretensions of Sancho and his titulature have been vigorously debated ever since Ramón Menéndez Pidal referred to him as an "anti-emperor" (antiemperador). Sancho never styled himself "emperor" in any of his charters, but he did occasionally employ imperial terminology. The most extensive title he ever used occurs in a document of 26 December 1032: "the aforementioned most serene King Sancho reigning in Pamplona and in Aragon and in Sobrarbe and in Ribagorza as well as in all Gascony and also in the whole of Castile, and overlording, it may be said, amply in León, that is, in Astorga ruling (inperante) by the grace of God". In the preceding document the "imperial" term is connected with his rule in Astorga, but in a document dated 19 March 1033 it is connected with Gascony—"King Sancho Garcés reigning in Aragon and in Castile and in León, from Zamora as far as in Barcelona, and ruling (imperante) the whole of Gascony"—while in another of unknown date it refers to his rule of Castile—"the most serene King Sancho reigning by the grace of God in Pamplona, in Aragon, in Sobrarbe, in Ribagorza, in Gascony, and ruling (imperante) in the whole of Castile by God's grace". The only charter that styles Sancho "emperor" is a later forgery found in the cartulary of San Juan de la Peña that reads, "Sancho, King and Emperor in Castile and in Pamplona and in Aragon and in Sobrarbe and in Ribagorza".

In a certain charter Sancho III issued in 1032, while he was in La Rioja, and preserved in the cartulary of Albelda, he refers to the city of León as the imperiali culmine ("summit of the empire"): "Our Lord [Jesus Christ] reigning over all and under his empire (imperium) [Sancho] king in Aragon and in Pamplona and in Castile and in the Tierra de Campos as well as in León the imperial acme". There are also two authentic surviving documents that refer to Sancho's imperium (empire, rule), both from 1034. The first, dated 24 September and preserved in the cartulary of San Juan de la Peña, connects his imperium with all his domains: "[in] the times of King Sancho holding [his] empire in Aragon and in Pamplona and in Castile and in León". The other, from the archives of the Cathedral of León, describes León as an imperium: "the kingdom [and] empire [of] King Sancho in León".

In the twelfth and thirteenth centuries, scribes began to refer to Sancho as rex Hispaniarum—"King of the Spains"—a style which implied his lordship over all the Iberian domains. Two forged charters from the monastery of San Salvador de Oña, where Sancho was buried, call him this: "Sancho, king by the grace of God of the Spains" There is another charter, likewise forged, from the abbey of San Millán de la Cogolla which calls him "Sancho, by the grace of God of the Spains king, overseeing day by day all Spain". Although they shed no light on Sancho's self-perception, these medieval forgeries are "plainly valid for understanding the vision that later generations had of Sancho the Great as ‘king of the Spains’ and not of an ethnicity or a petty kingdom." An anonymous twelfth-century text recording the refoundation of the Diocese of Palencia by Sancho III notes that "with reason he could be called ‘king of the kings of Spain’."

A title nearly equivalent to rex Hispaniarium was used of Sancho during his lifetime. In the same letter in which he referred to Alfonso V of León as "emperor", Abbot Oliva called Sancho the "Iberian king" (rex ibericus). The letter was addressed to Sancho:

For the lord and venerable Iberian king, Oliba, bishop of the holy see of Vic, with all the community of Santa Maria de Ripoll governed by him, desires the joys of life both present and future.

Another contemporary source from outside Sancho's realms refers to him with a title nearly equivalent to the strictly anachronistic rex Hispaniarium. In his Historiarium sui temporis libri quinque, the French chronicler Ralph Glaber lists the kings have maintained friendly relations with Robert II of France by sending him gifts and petitioning him for aid. Among them is Sancio rege Navarriae Hispaniarium. This title is susceptible to more than one interpretation, and literally translates as "Sancho king of Navarre of the Spains".

Between 1033 and 1035 Sancho III may even have minted coins bearing the imperial title with reference to his capital of Nájera—NAIARA / IMPERATOR—although these may instead be coins of Sancho I, of Alfonso the Battler, or of Alfonso VII. Menéndez Pidal argued that the coin was issued between 1033 and 1035, after Sancho's conquest of León, but P. Germán de Iruña suggests that it might have been issued before 1030.

The fourteenth-century Chronicle of San Juan de la Peña, in its fourteenth chapter, notes that "because of the wide lands that he possessed and which he was made to dominate Sancho was called ‘emperor’."

=== Galicia and Portugal ===
The early twelfth-century Historia silense, a chronicle focussing on the reign of Ferdinand I and written from a royalist perspective, never refers to Ferdinand as "emperor", but it does describe his third son, García, who ruled Galicia after his death, as a "good emperor" because of his military victories:

For García placed confidence in his men. Therefore at that time, within the bounds of the empire, he was regarded by all soldiers as a distinguished knight, since in every war he had been accustomed to accomplishing at the same time the duties of a tireless soldier and a good emperor.

The word "emperor" in this context clearly refers to a military role. The word "empire" was used in one later charter from Portugal (1144), but in this case too it refers only to the authority or territorial power of the Portuguese king, Afonso Henriques:

I, King Alfonso, son of Count Henry, grandson of Alfonso [VI], emperor of Spain, holding the Portuguese empire (imperium Portucalense), make this charter of rights (fuero). . .

=== Counts ===
==== Counts of Castile ====
The imperial style was used on several occasions by Count García Fernández of Castile, who was nominally subject to the Leonese king. In a fuero granted to Castrojeriz in 974, which survives in a thirteenth-century confirmation, he refers to himself as "I, García Fernández, by the grace of God count and emperor of Castile" (Ego Garssia Ferdinandi, gratia Dei comes et imperator Castelle). Ramón Menéndez Pidal argued that this text originally read imperante Castelle ("ruling Castile") and was mangled at the time of the confirmation. Alfonso García Gallo rejected this on the grounds that an imperante phrase with a different structure is used in the dating clause of the fuero and that two different structures would have been employed for the same terminology. In 987, in a charter of donation to the church of Santillana del Mar, García Fernández again styled himself emperor: "I, Count García Fernández, and the Countess Doña Eva, from the count [and/of the] emperor eternal greetings in [the name of] the Lord God " (Ego Garcia Fredenandiz comes, et donna Aba cometissa, comitis imperatoris in Domino Deo et eterna salutem).

There also survive documents from Castile which make reference to the imperator terrae ("emperor of the land"), but the relevance of these was disputed by Mayer and Menéndez Pidal, who disagreed whether they referred to the Count of Castile or the King of León. The charters date from 968, when the count was Fernán González and the king was Ramiro III, and 1042, when the count, Ferdinand I, was also king.

==== Banu Gómez ====
Another local count, who with the help of Almanzor would briefly expel king Bermudo II and control the eastern part of the Kingdom of León as well as its capitol, would likewise express imperial pretensions. The record of a 992 plea would be dated to "the sixth year of the imperium of our Lord, Count García Gómez".

=== Late Middle Ages ===
Alfonso X of Castile (r. 1252–1284), was a candidate in the 1257 imperial election during the Interregnum of the Holy Roman Empire and claim the titles rex Romanorum and imperator electus. He legitimized his claim through his descent from Holy Roman Emperor Frederick Barbarossa, Byzantine Emperor Isaac II Angelos and the previous Spanish emperors. There had been a debate if Alfonso X was inspired by the Spanish imperial tradition or by Roman imperial tradition. The description of the coronation of Alfonso VII in later editions of the Estoria de España, which were written after his denunciation of the imperial titles in 1275, were influenced by his failed attempt. Additionally, the Siete Partidas, which had been written in the context of said Fecho del Imperio, came from a Leonese–Castilian tradition rather than Imperial tradition.

Alfonso XI of Castile (r. 1312–1350), used the title "by the grace of God, Emperor of Spain" (in Old Spanish) in the fuero he granted to Guadalajara in 1337: Don Alfonso, por la gracia de Dios, emperador de España. It had already been used of him in the Chronicle of Cardeña (1327), which says that "Lord Alfonso inherited the realm and was raised Emperor of Spain" (D. Alfonso heredó el regno, è fue alzado Emperador de España).

In the Late Middle Ages there spread belief in a "Last World Emperor who, at the end of days, would resign his imperium directly to God in Jerusalem at Golgotha". In Spain this belief was combined with Joachimism and prophecies attributed to Isidore of Seville to produce belief in a future Spanish emperor, variously named el Encubierto (the Hidden One), el Murciélago (the Bat) or el Nuevo David (the New David). It was thought that each succeeding Spanish king might be the hidden one who would defeat the Antichrist and begin the conquest of Islamdom from Granada to Mecca. These expectations reached a fever pitch during the reign of Ferdinand II of Aragon between 1480 and 1513.

== Interpretation ==
The imperial title has at times been connected to (i) the independence of Spain from the Carolingian and Holy Roman Empires, (ii) the supremacy of one Spanish king over others, (iii) the king who held the Visigothic capital of Toledo or León, capital of the Visigothic "successor state", (iv) a military commander with success on the battlefield, (v) rule over multiple peoples (in an ethnic or religious sense), or (vi) propaganda, as in the case of Cluny or courtly historians or biographers.

=== Sovereignty and hierarchy ===
The first historians to seriously study the usage of the imperial title in certain documents pertaining to the kings of León were, around the same time, A. Schunter and Ernesto Mayer, who argued that it had been adopted in order to affirm the independence of the Leonese from the restored Roman Empire of Charlemagne (crowned by Pope Leo III in 800).

Of the historical development of the imperial concept in Spain one historian writes that the "constant idea, analogous to that of the German Emperor, of the hierarchical superiority of the Spanish Emperor over the other sovereigns of Spain, the restoration of the Gothic kingdom, the submission of the nobility, the pomp of the court and the fight against Islam [...] is a mere aspiration in Alfonso III, an attempt in Ordoño II and only a reality in Alfonso VI". The historian Roger Collins suggests that "the intermittent use of the title imperator, "emperor", by the rulers of Asturias and León from the tenth century onward seems to have indicated their hegemonial pretentions."

German historian Carl Erdmann associated the decline of the power of Salian emperors to the usage of the imperial title by the Kings of Castile. In 1152 Alfonso VII married the aforementioned Richeza, niece of Conrad III of Germany and cousin of Holy Roman Emperor Frederick I. The Catalan historian Joan Beneyto i Pérez has connected this marriage into the German royal family to Alfonso's use of the imperial title. The Jesuit historian Eleuterio Elorduy has connected it with Alfonso's voluntary division of his realm in 1154 between his sons Sancho and Ferdinand. The German historian Klaus Herbers argued that Alfonso "based his emperorship was overall obviously based on connections, which he [Alfonso] saw as vassalage" and connected his coronation in 1135 to the death of Alfonso the Battler a year prior.

=== Military honor ===
Klaus Herbers speculates that the use of imperator for Alfonso III of Asturias refers to his military success. His case remains up to debate.

=== Cluny ===
Sometime between 1053 and 1065 Ferdinand I had pledged an annual census of 1,000 aurei to the Abbey of Cluny. This donation was re-established by Alfonso VI in 1077 and then in 1090 increased to 2,000 aurei by this same monarch. Known as the "Alfonsine census", it was "the biggest donation that Cluny ever received from king or layman, and it was never to be surpassed." "The emphatically imperial character of Cluny's bond with ... the Leonese-Castilian ruling dynasty" can be seen in a late eleventh-century codex of the De virginitate beatae Mariae of Ildephonsus of Toledo, which was presented by Abbot Hugh I of Cluny to Alfonso VI. This manuscript, now preserved at Parma, was illuminated at Cluny in gold letters on purple vellum, a style "reminiscent of the famous imperial presentation codices produced by the Echternach School" for the Holy Roman Emperors in the preceding two centuries. It may have been given on the occasion of the increase of the census in 1077 or perhaps on Hugh's visit to Burgos in 1090. Cluniac authors from this time, such as Peter the Venerable and Bernard of Clairvaux, do refer to the king of León and Castile as "emperor" (imperator). After a large gift to Cluny following his conquest of Huesca in 1097, Peter I of Aragon and Navarre was mentioned alongside the king of León in the daily intercessional prayers of the monks of Cluny. Peter's successor, Alfonso the Battler, may also have been mentioned in their prayers between 1109 and 1113, during his marriage to Alfonso VI's heiress, Queen Urraca.

== Table of emperors ==
Galicia,	Asturias/León,	Castile,	Pamplona
Galicia and Portugal,	León and Castile,		Pamplona and Aragon

Image	Emperor	Recorded title or description	Source
	Alfonso III of Asturias (866–910)	Hispaniae imperator (emperor of Spain) imperator totius Hispaniae (Emperor of all Spain) magnus imperator (great emperor)	twelfth-century forgeries; posthumous royal charter
	Sancho I of Pamplona (905–925)	optime imperator (excellent emperor)	Códice de Roda (late-10th century)
	Ordoño II of León (910–924)	serenissimus imperator (most serene emperor) imperator Legionensis (Leonese Emperor)	contemporary royal charter Códice de Roda (late-10th century)
	Ramiro II of León (931–951)	imperator (emperor)	posthumous royal charters
	Ordoño III of León (951–956)	dominissimus imperator (most lordly emperor)	contemporary royal charter
	Ramiro III of León (966–984)	dominissimus imperator (most lordly emperor); Basileus (king/emperor)	contemporary royal charters
	Fernán González of Castile (923–970)	imperator terrae (emperor of the land)	contemporary private charter
	García Fernández of Castile (970–995)	imperator Castelle (emperor of Castile)	contemporary charter
	Alfonso V of León (999–1025)	imperator (emperor)	correspondence of Abbot Oliva
	Sancho III of Pamplona (1004–1035)	imperator in Castella (emperor in Castile)	later forgery
	Bermudo III of León (1027–1037)	imperator in Leione or in Gallecia (emperor in León or Galicia)	contemporary charters, correspondence of Abbot Oliva
	Ferdinand I of León and Castile (1035–1065)	imperator magnus (great emperor)	charter of his daughters'
	García II of Galicia and Portugal (1065–1072)	bonus imperator (good emperor)	Historia silense
	Alfonso VI of León and Castile (1065–1109)	imperator totius Hispaniae (emperor of all Spain) al-Imbraţūr dhī-l-Millatayn (emperor of the two religions)	contemporary charters and correspondence
	Raymond of Galicia (1092–1107)	Gallecie imperator (emperor of Galicia)	contemporary charter
	Urraca of León and Castile (1109–1126)	tocius Gallecie imperatrix (empress of all Galicia) totius hispaniae imperatrix (empress of all Spain)	contemporary charters
	Alfonso I of Aragon and Pamplona (1104–1134)	imperator in Castella, Gallicia (emperor in Castile, Galicia)	contemporary charters
	Alfonso VII of León and Castile (1126–1157)	imperator (emperor)	Chronica Adefonsi imperatoris

== Bibliography ==
- Annunziata, Francesco Saverio. 2017. Poesie trobadoriche relative a Federico II di Svevia. PhD diss. Università degli Studi di Napoli Federico II.
- Arco Garay, Ricardo del. 1944. La idea de imperio en la política y la literatura españolas. Madrid.
- Beneyto i Pérez, Joan. 1942. España y el problema de Europa: Contribución a la historia de la idea de imperio. Madrid.
- Bishko, Charles Julian. 1984. "Liturgical Intercession at Cluny for the King-Emperors of León". Spanish and Portuguese Monastic History, 600–1300. London: Variorum Reprints. [Originally published in Studia Monastica, 7 (1961):53–82.]
- Bishko, Charles Julian. 1984. "Count Henrique of Portugal, Cluny, and the Antecedents of the Pacto Sucessório". Spanish and Portuguese Monastic History, 600–1300. London: Variorum Reprints. [Originally published in Revista Portuguesa de Historia, 13 (1971): 155–90.]
- Brown, Elizabeth A. R. and Michael W. Cothren. 1986. "The Twelfth-Century Crusading Window of the Abbey of Saint-Denis: Praeteritorum Enim Recordatio Futurorum est Exhibitio". Journal of the Warburg and Courtauld Institutes, 49: 1–40.
- Collins, Roger. 1989. "The Arab Conquest of Spain, 710–797". Basil Blackwell.
- Collins, Roger. 2000. "Visigothic Spain, 409–711". Spain: A History. Raymond Carr, ed. Oxford: Oxford University Press, 39–62.
- Collins, Roger. 2012. Caliphs and Kings: Spain, 796–1031. London: Wiley Blackwell.
- Cullinan, Margaret M. 1975. Imperator Hispaniae: The Genesis of ‘Spain’. PhD dissertation, City University of New York.
- Dembińska, Maria. 1990. "A Polish Princess-Empress of Spain and Countess of Provence in the Twelfth Century". Frauen in Spatantike un Fruhmittelalter. Werner Affeldt, ed. Sigmaringne, 283–90.
- Elorduy, Eleuterio. 1940. La idea de imperio en el pensamiento español y de otros pueblos. Madrid: Espasa-Calpe.
- Erdmann, Carl (1951). Forschungen zur politischen Ideenwelt des Frühmittelalters: aus dem Nachlass des Verfassers (in German). Akademie Verlag. ISBN 9783112772904.
- Fernández y González, F. 1867. "Significación e importancia de la idea del Imperio en España". Discursos leídos ante la Real Academia de la Historia, 3.
- Fletcher, Richard A. 1978. The Episcopate in the Kingdom of León in the Twelfth Century. Oxford: Oxford University Press.
- Fletcher, Richard A. 1984. Saint James's Catapult: The Life and Times of Diego Gelmírez of Santiago de Compostela. Oxford: Oxford University Press.
- García Gallo, Alfonso. 1945. "El imperio medieval español". Arbor, 4(11): 199–228. [Reprinted in Historia de España, Florentino Pérez Embid, ed. (Madrid: 1953), 108–43.]
- Gibert, Rafael. 1951. "Observaciones a la tesis del Imperio hispánico y los cinco reinos". Arbor, 18(63): 440–56.
- González Jiménez, Manuel. 2010. "La idea imperial antes y después de Alfonso VI". Alfonso VI: Imperator totius orbis Hispanie. Fernando Suárez and Andrés Gambra, eds. Sanz y Torres, 11–29.
- Herbers, Klaus [in German] (2006). Geschichte Spaniens im Mittelalter: vom Westgotenreich bis zum Ende des 15. Jahrhunderts (in German). W. Kohlhammer Verlag. ISBN 9783170188716.
- Hüffer, Hermann J. 1930. "Die leonesischen Hegemoniebestrebungen und Kaisertitel". Spanische Forschungen der Görresgesellschaft, 3: 337–84.
- Hüffer, Hermann J. 1933. La idea imperial española. Madrid.
- Iruña, P. Germán de. 1935. "Discutibles interpretaciones de la moneda de Sancho el Mayor". Revista Internacional de los Estudios Vascos = Révue Internationale des Études Basques, 26:655–60.
- Iturmendi Morales, José. 1972. "En torno a la idea de Imperio en Alfonso X el Sabio". Revista de Estudios Políticos, 182: 83–158.
- Lacarra de Miguel, José María. 1945. "Textos navarros del Códice de Roda". Estudios de Edad Media de la Corona de Aragón, 1: 194–283.
- Larragueta, Santos García. "La Orden de San Juan en la crisis del Imperio Hispánico del siglo XII". Hispania, 12(49): 483–524.
- Lipskey, Glenn Edward. 1972. The Chronicle of Alfonso the Emperor: A Translation of the Chronica Adefonsi imperatoris, with Study and Notes. PhD dissertation, Northwestern University.
- López Ortiz, José. 1941. "Notas para el estudio de la idea imperial leonesa". Ciudad de Dios, 153: 186–90.
- López Ortiz, José. 1942. "Las ideas imperiales en el medioevo español". Escorial, 6: 43–70.
- Lourie, Elena. 1975. "The Will of Alfonso I, ‘El Batallador’, King of Aragon and Navarre: A Reassessment". Speculum, 50(4): 635–51.
- Mackay, Angus. 2000. "The Late Middle Ages, 1250–1500". Spain: A History. Raymond Carr, ed. Oxford: Oxford University Press, 90–115.
- Mackay, Angus and Muhammad Benaboud. 1978. "The Authenticity of Alfonso VI's Letter to Yūsuf B. Tāšufīn". Al-Andalus, 43: 233–37.
- Mackay, Angus and Muhammad Benaboud. 1979. "Alfonso VI of León and Castile, ‘al-Imbraţūr dhū-l-Millatayn’". Bulletin of Hispanic Studies, 56(2): 95–102.
- Mackay, Angus and Muhammad Benaboud. 1984. "Yet again Alfonso VI, ‘the Emperor, Lord of [the Adherents of] the Two Faiths, the Most Excellent Ruler’: A Rejoinder to Norman Roth". Bulletin of Hispanic Studies, 61(2): 171–81.
- Maravall, José Antonio. 1973. "El pensamiento política de la Alta Edad Media". Estudios de historia del pensamiento española (Madrid, 1973), I, 35–66.
- Maravall, José Antonio. 1973. "El concepto de monarquía en la Edad Media española". Estudios de historia del pensamiento española (Madrid, 1973), I, 69–89.
- Martin, Georges. 1999. "L'escarboucle de Saint-Denis, le roi de France et l'empereur des Espagnes". Saint-Denis et la royauté: en l'honneur de Bernard Guenée. Claude Gauvard, ed. Paris, 439–62.
- Martín Duque, Ángel J. 2002. "Del reino de Pamplona al reino de Navarra". Príncipe de Viana, 63(227): 841–50.
- Martínez Díez, Gonzalo. 2007. Sancho III el Mayor: Rey de Pamplona, Rex Ibericus. Madrid: Marcial Pons Historia.
- Mauntel, Christoph. 2017. "Ideas of Empire: A Comparative Study in Anglo-Saxon and Spanish Political Thought (from the Eighth to the Twelfth Century)". Viator, 48 (3): 1–25.
- Menéndez Pidal, Ramón. 1929. La España del Cid, 2 vols. Madrid: Editorial Plutarco.
- Menéndez Pidal, Ramón. 1932. "Adefonsus imperator toletanus, magnificus triumphator". Boletín de la Real Academia de la Historia, 100: 513–38. [Reprinted in Historia y epopeya (Madrid: 1934), 235–62, and in Idea imperial de Carlos V (Madrid: 1941), 127–63.]
- Menéndez Pidal, Ramón. 1934. "El «Romanz del infant García» y Sancho de Navarra antiemperador". Historia y epopeya (Madrid), 33–98. [Reprinted in Idea imperial de Carlos V (Madrid: 1941), 73–125.]
- Menéndez Pidal, Ramón. 1950. El imperio hispánico y los cinco reinos. Madrid: Instituto de Estudios Políticos.
- Meyer, Bruno Berthold. 2002. Kastilien, die Staufer und das Imperium: ein Jahrhundert politischer Kontakte im Zeichen des Kaisertums. Matthiesen Verlag.
- O'Callaghan, Joseph F. 1969. "The Beginnings of the Cortes of León-Castile". American Historical Review, 74(5): 1503–37.
- O'Callaghan, Joseph F. 1990 "Image and Reality: The King Creates His Kingdom". Emperor of Culture: Alfonso X the Learned of Castile and His Thirteenth-Century Renaissance. Robert I. Burns, ed. Philadelphia: University of Pennsylvania Press.
- Pérez Rodríguez, Antonino M. 1993. "Castilla, Cluny y la Crónica najerense". III Semana de Estudios Medievales de Nájera. Logroño: Instituto de Estudios Riojanos.
- Pérez de Urbel, Justo. 1954. "La división del reino por Sancho el Mayor", Hispania, 14(54): 3–26.
- Ramos y Loscertales, J. M. "La sucesión del rey Alfonso VI", Anuario de la historia del derecho español, 13 (1936–41): 36–99.
- Reilly, Bernard F. 1976. "The Chancery of Alfonso VII of León-Castilla: The Period 1116–1135 Reconsidered". Speculum, 51(2): 243–61.
- Reilly, Bernard F. 1982. The Kingdom of León-Castilla under Queen Urraca, 1109–1126. Princeton: Princeton University Press.
- Reilly, Bernard F. 1985. "The Chancery of Alfonso VI of León-Castile (1065–1109)". Santiago, St.-Denis, and St. Peter. Bernard F. Reilly, ed. New York, 1–40.
- Reilly, Bernard F. 1988. The Kingdom of León-Castilla under King Alfonso VI, 1065–1109. Princeton: Princeton University Press.
- Reilly, Bernard F. 1998. The Kingdom of León-Castilla under King Alfonso VII, 1109–1157. Philadelphia: University of Pennsylvania Press.
- Rodríguez, Justiniano. 1988. "Presencia de la nobleza navarra en la política leonese del siglo X". Princípe de Viana, Anejo, 8:161–170.
- Rodríguez Latorre, Luis Eduardo. 1994. "Una ceca en el Camino: la ceca de Nájera". IV Semana de Estudios Medievales de Nájera, 2–6 August 1993. José Ignacio de la Iglesia Duarte, ed. Logroño: Instituto de Estudios Riojanos, 273–88.
- Roth, Norman. 1984. "Again Alfonso VI, ‘Imbarātūr dhu’l-Millatayn’, and Some New Data". Bulletin of Hispanic Studies, 61(2): 165–69.
- Roth, Norman. 1985. "Alfonso VI: An Answer to MacKay and Benaboud's Reply to Roth". Bulletin of Hispanic Studies, 62(2): 179–81.
- Saitta, Armando. 1961. "Un problema storiografico: l'Impero Spagnolo Medievale". Momenti e figure della civiltà europea: saggi storici e storiografici, I. Storia e Letteratura: Raccolta di Studi e Testi, 176. Rome: Edizioni di Storia e Letteratura. [Originally published in Rivista storica italiana, 66 (1954), 2:240–85 and 3:377–409.]
- Sánchez Candeira, Alfonso. 1951. El «regnum-imperium» leonés hasta 1037. Madrid.
- Schlieben, Barbara (2009). Verspielte Macht: Politik und Wissen am Hof Alfons' X. (1252-1284) (in German). Akademie Verlag. ISBN 9783050044996.
- Schmidt, Peer (2001). Spanische Universalmonarchie oder "teutsche Libertet": das spanische Imperium in der Propaganda des Dreissigjährigen Krieges (in German). Franz Steiner Verlag. ISBN 9783515078337.
- Schramm, Percy Ernst. 1950. "Das kastilische König- und Kaisertum während der Reconquista". Festschrift für Gerhard Ritter (Tübingen), 87–139.
- Sirantoine, Hélène. 2012. Imperator Hispaniae: les idéologies impériales dans le royaume de León (IX^{e}–XII^{e} siècles). Madrid: Casa de Velázquez.
- Steiger, A. 1946. "Alfonso X el Sabio y la idea imperial". Arbor, 6(18): 389–402.
- Steindorff, Ernst. 1881. "Angeblicher Conflict zwischen Heinrich III. und Ferdinand I. von Castilien". Jahrbücher des Deutschen Reichs unter Heinrich III, II. Leipzig.
- Ubieto Arteta, Antonio. 1956. "Navarra-Aragón y la idea imperial de Alfonso VII de Castilla". Estudios de la Edad Media en la Corona de Aragón, 6:41–82.
- Ubieto Arteta, Antonio. 1960. "Estudios en torno a la división del Reino por Sancho el Mayor de Navarra". Príncipe de Viana, 21: 5–56, 163–236.
