= Battle of Tamarón =

Battle in Spain in 1037

Coordinates: 42°16′N 3°59′W

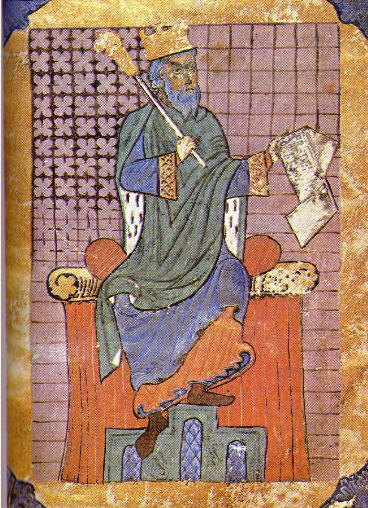
Ferdinand I bearing the sword, from a twelfth-century Leonese cartulary called the Tumbo A.

The Battle of Tamarón took place on 4 September 1037 between Ferdinand, Count of Castile, and Vermudo III, King of León. Ferdinand, who had married Bermudo's sister Sancha, defeated and killed his brother-in-law near Tamarón, Spain, after a brief war. As a result, Ferdinand succeeded Bermudo on the throne.

Ferdinand's father, Sancho the Great, who was jure uxoris Count of Castile, had entrusted his son with the county as early as 1029. In 1034 he had conquered the imperial city of León and forced Bermudo to take refuge in remote Galicia. After Sancho died in 1035 Bermudo returned to León and launched a war for control of the Tierra de Campos, the territory between the Cea and Pisuerga rivers, long disputed with Castile (which was nominally a Leonese vassal). The dispute dates back to the tenth century. Under Sancho the Great the region had been united to Castile, and Ferdinand considered it as his wife's dowry. Recently, Gonzalo Martínez Díez has disputed this thesis, first enunciated by the Historia silense in the 1110s. He finds no evidence of any discord between Castile and León in the years 1035–7, and the lands between the Cea and Pisuerga, controlled by his father, do not seem to have been controlled by Ferdinand.

What is certain is that the war in which he lost his life was initiated by Bermudo. Ferdinand, who also had a claim to be the heirless Bermudo's successor through his wife, was forced to call on his brother García Sánchez III of Navarre, because the Leonese forces greatly outnumbered his own. In the ensuing battle, Bermudo fell from his horse, Pelayueol, and was surrounded and killed while trying to approach Ferdinand. Seven of his knights died with him. Autopsies performed in the twentieth century showed that he had received forty lance wounds, many in the lower abdomen, typical for dismounted knights. After the death of Bermudo his army probably evaporated; there is no further discussion of the battle in the sources: the king's body is said to have been carried off the field. After his victory Ferdinand took possession of León after a brief siege and was accepted as Bermudo's successor, though he was not crowned in León until 22 June 1038. Bermudo was buried in the Panteón de los Reyes in the Basilica of San Isidoro in his capital.

According to the Historia silense, Chronica naierensis, and Chronicon mundi, Bermudo "crossed the Cantabrian border" (transiecto Cantabriensium limite), i.e., the Pisuerga, and engaged Ferdinand super vallem Tamaron. This is Tamarón, a suburb of Burgos in the valley of the Sambol. The location of the battle in Támara de Campos was first made in the thirteenth century by Rodrigo Jiménez de Rada. Támara has never been called Tamarón, nor is it in a valley, though Rodrigo placed the battle near the river Carrión probably out of confusion between the two.

The earliest source to explicitly date the battle is Pelagius of Oviedo, who writes that Bermudo died in his tenth year (which he incorrectly makes 1032, though it was in fact 1037). The last document in which Bermudo appears is a donation to the Monastery of Celanova on 9 June 1037. A document of 9 January 1038 refers to the reign of Ferdinand. These dates represent the termini post quem and ante quem of the battle (Bermudo's death). A certain psalter that once belonged to Ferdinand preserves the obituary Ovitum Veremudi regis in bello pugnator fortis die IV feria mensis septembris era TLXXV ("Bermudo, king of Oviedo, in war a strong fighter, the fourth day of the month of September in the Era 1075").
