= Gonzalo of Sobrarbe and Ribagorza =

Spanish nobel (c. 1020 – 1043)

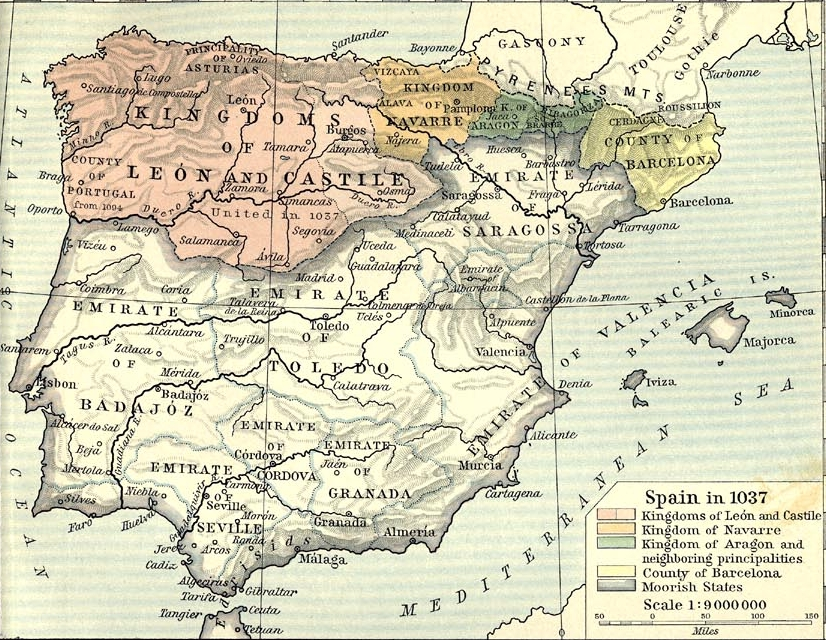
Spain in 1037. Gonzalo's kingdom is shown in green, the same colour as Aragon, which annexed it in 1043. (Click to enlarge.)

Gonzalo Sánchez (c. 1020 – 26 June 1043) was the king of Sobrarbe and Ribagorza, two small Pyrenean counties, from 1035 until his death. He was the son of King Sancho III of Navarre and his wife, Muniadona of Castile. Before his death in 1035, Sancho divided his kingdom between his sons, leaving Sobrarbe and Ribagorza to Gonzalo. He governed them as vassal of his elder brother, García Sánchez III, who had inherited Navarre. Gonzalo is thought to have been ineffectual and unpopular, with vassals defecting to his half-brother, Ramiro I of Aragon, during his own lifetime. Within a decade of his death, his reign was being ignored and he was left out of a list of rulers of Ribagorza.

== Reign ==
On 14 April 1035, according to a document preserved in the monastery of San Juan de la Peña, Sancho III granted Aragon to his eldest but illegitimate son Ramiro. In the same act the castle of Loarre and monastery of San Emeterio with their dependent villages were detached from Aragon and given to Gonzalo as part of his inheritance. There is no indication that the brothers were on poor terms. Gonzalo subsequently confirmed many charters alongside his brother and they often appear together in dating clauses.

Gonzalo was present with all his brothers and his brother-in-law, King Vermudo III of León, when Ramiro granted arras (a nuptial gift) to his future wife, Ermesinda of Bigorre on 22 August 1036. In Ramiro's charter recording the gift, Gonzalo is given the title of king. In 1037 Gonzalo joined his brothers García and Ramiro to confirm a donation of Jimeno Garcés, Ramiro's godfather, to the monastery of Leire. In this document García uses the title princeps (prince, from Latin for "foremost") to indicate his suzerainty over his brothers, while Ramiro and Gonzalo use the title regulus (petty king). This meeting probably took place either in Leire or else in García's capital, Pamplona. Neither the day nor the month is preserved in the record. The use of a royal title, even one as low as regulus, in the presence of his suzerain, García, is strong evidence that Gonzalo did not usurp a royal title, but that Sancho III intended to create kingdoms for Gonzalo and Ramiro. Gonzalo joined all his brothers, including the youngest, Ferdinand, at Anzánigo in 1037 (or perhaps as late as 1043), after Ferdinand had succeeded to the Kingdom of León.

== Death ==
Gonzalo's death on 26 June appears in the necrology of the Sobrarbean monastery of San Victorián, but the year is not recorded and has been the subject of much debate. The early modern historian Jerónimo Zurita incorrectly placed it in 1035. José de Moret suggested 1042 or 1043. A late source, the Chronicle of San Juan de la Peña, places it in 1037, but there is charter of disputed authenticity dated September 1039 that is confirmed by Gonzalo. As Ramiro confirmed the rights of Bishops of Urgell in Ribagorza in September 1040, it would appear that Gonzalo was dead by then. Pérez de Urbel thus places it between December 1039 and September 1040 and casts doubt on the dates of several documents mentioning Gonzalo after 1040 (a donation of Blasquita from 1041, a charter of Ramiro's from 1042, and a donation of Ramiro to Atón Garcés in 1043). Accepting these, Ubieto Arteta places Gonzalo's assassination in 1046. Nelson gives reason to believe that it was 1043.

The Chronicle of San Juan de la Peña reports that Gonzalo was assassinated by one of his own knights, Ramonat de Uasconya, who threw him from the bridge over the river Esera at Montclús, near Lascorz. He was interred in the monastery of San Victorián. On his death, García awarded his counties to Ramiro.

Gonzalo left no heirs and his short reign was soon forgotten. The Historia silense, written around 1115, does not even mention him in its version of the division of Sancho III's realm. It even records that Ramiro was given the "remote" region of Aragon on account of his illegitimacy, despite the fact that Gonzalo's division was more remote than Aragon and his legitimacy unquestioned. The anonymous Chronica naierensis of about 1200, basing its account entirely on the Silense, likewise ignores Gonzalo and blames Ramiro's position on his illegitimacy. The Liber regum, also from around 1200 but independent of the Silense, nevertheless shows no awareness of Gonzalo.
