= Muniadona of Castile =

Queen of Pamplona from 1010 to 1032

- Empress of Spain
- Born: c. 995
- Died: 1066
- Spouse: Sancho III of Pamplona
- Issue: Garcia III, King of Pamplona; Ferdinand I, King of León; Jimena, Queen of León; Gonzalo of Ribagorza
- House: Beni Mamaduna
- Father: Sancho García of Castile
- Mother: Urraca Gómez

Muniadona of Castile (c. 995 – 1066), also called Mayor or Munia, was Queen of Pamplona (1011 – 1035) by her marriage with King Sancho Garcés III, who later added to his domains the Counties of Ribagorza (1017) and Castile (1028) using her dynastic rights to these territories.

== Biography ==
=== Dynastic rights ===
Eldest child and daughter of Sancho García, Count of Castile and his wife Urraca, probably a member of the Banu Gómez family, she married King Sancho Garcés III of Pamplona before 27 June 1011 when both appear confirming certain privileges of the Monastery of San Millán.

In 1017, William Isarn, Count of Ribagorza was assassinated during an expedition to the Val d'Aran. William's illegitimacy had resulted in his claim to the county being challenged, and it had been partitioned between him and his cousin Mayor García, daughter of García Fernández of Castile by William's aunt, Ava de Ribagorza, along with her husband Count Raymond III of Pallars Jussà. William's death without heirs led Mayor and Raymond to claim the entire county, but this was contested by Sancho Garcés III of Pamplona, asserting the dynastic rights of his wife Muniadona, who as eldest daughter of Mayor's brother, Count Sancho García, could claim to be the rightful heiress of her grandmother Ava, and hence of Ava's father Count Raymond II of Ribagorza. In 1017 the troops of Sancho III invaded Ribagorza and he took control over William's half of the county, while the rest remained in the hands of Mayor García until 1025 when, having been repudiated by her husband, Mayor transferred most of the remainder to Sancho III, Raymond III only retaining the Noguera Ribagorçana basin. It may have been in recognition of this transfer that Muniadona adopted the name Mayor that she would sometimes use subsequently.

Again, in 1028, Muniadona's dynastic rights were invoked. Following the assassination of Count García Sánchez of Castile by the Vela family in León, Sancho III took control of Castile since his wife was the eldest sister of the late count. Their son Ferdinand Sánchez was named count in 1029.

=== Widowhood and testament ===
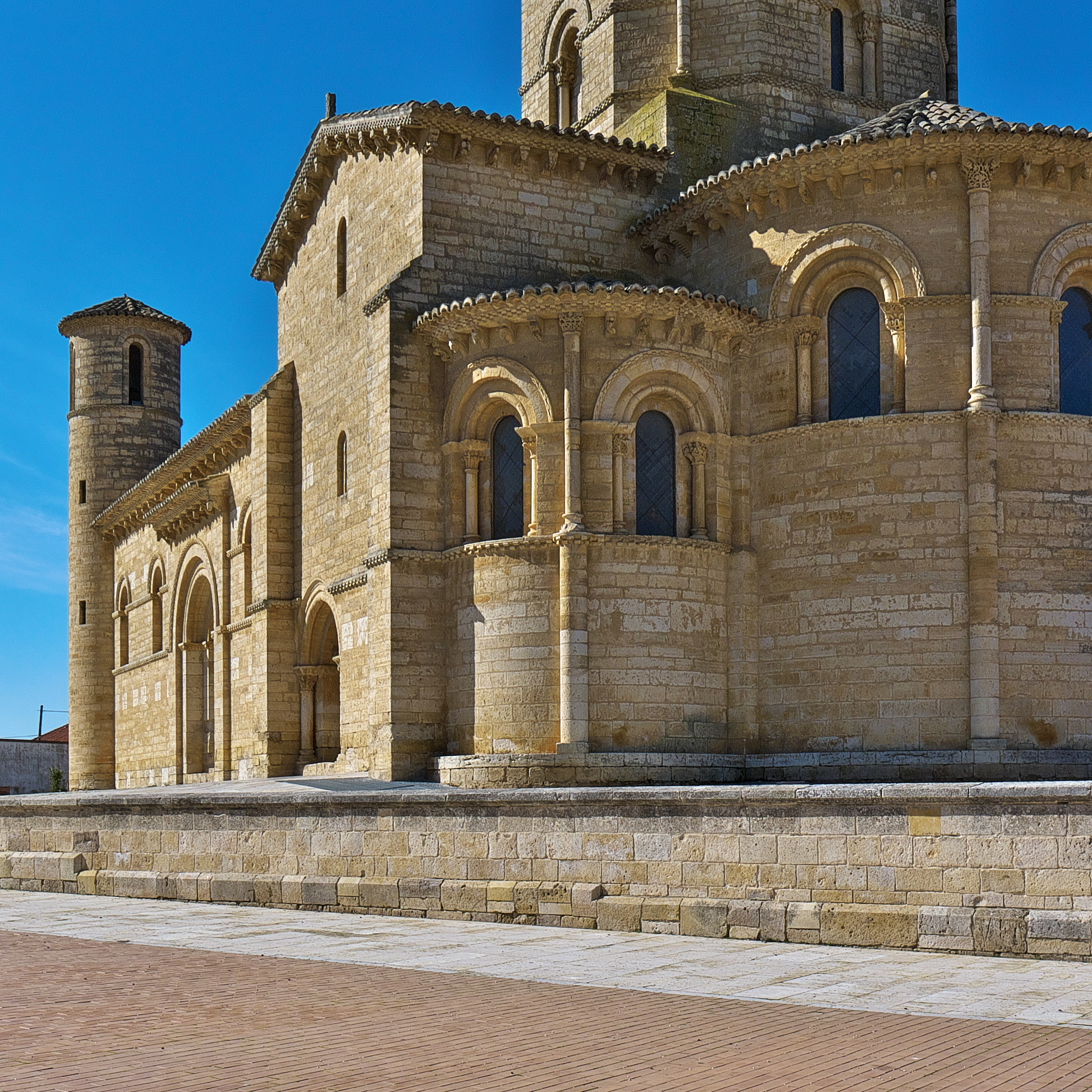
Monastery of San Martín de Tours de Frómista, Muniadona's burial place.

Muniadona outlived her husband and most of her children, except perhaps Jimena who was still alive in December 1063. After the death of her husband in 1035, Muniadona founded the monastery of San Martín de Tours de Frómista, and in her testament dated 13 June 1066, she requested to be buried there. She probably died shortly after executing her last will.

Her last will also "determined the definitive transfer of the horses that she had lent to those who enjoyed them until then. She also freed the Saracens who had converted to Christianity that were under her dependence. In addition, she declared the monastery of San Martín de Tours de Frómista owner of the estates that it had been exploiting and gave it other properties in Bobadilla and Agero, the thirds of the tithes of Frómista and Población de Campos, as well as a half meadow and a serna in Villota. She also divided her sheep, cows and horses in Frómista among the ecclesiastical centers of Santa María, San Juan Bautista and San Martín, and the cows she had in Asturias among the place of her burial, the monastery of San Martín de Tours de Frómista and the three monks who were in charge of praying for her soul".

=== Family and children ===
From her marriage to King Sancho Garcés were born: (Note: They could have also been the parents of a daughter named Mayor, the wife of Pons, Count of Toulouse. She could have died or have been repudiated by her husband before 1040/1045 when Pons had taken a second wife, Almodis de la Marche. Historians Justo Pérez de Urbel and J. de Jaurgain believe that Mayor was the daughter of King Sancho whereas H. Debax and Martí Aurell argue that her origins were in the County of Foix since the document specifying her dowry was kept in the archives of this comital house. Two additional children have been attributed, but are not generally accepted by scholars: a Bernardo who appears in one charter in place of Fernando and likely represents a scribal error, and a legitimate son Ramiro, perhaps derived from confusion with Sancho's illegitimate son of the same name.)

- García Sánchez III, nicknamed "the one from Nájera", King of Pamplona from 1035 until his death in 1054 and married to Stephanie of Foix.
- Fernando Sánchez, King of León married to Sancha of León.
- Gonzalo Sánchez, petty King of Sobrarbe and Ribagorza.
- Jimena Sánchez, queen consort of León by her marriage to Bermudo III.

== Bibliography ==
- Govantes, Ángel Casimiro (1846). Real Academia de la Historia (ed.). Diccionario geográfico-histórico de España (in Spanish). Vol. II. Madrid: Imprenta de los Sres. Viuda de Jordán e hijos. OCLC 458089544.
- Martínez Diez, Gonzalo (2007). Sancho III el Mayor Rey de Pamplona, Rex Ibericus (in Spanish). Madrid: Marcial Pons Historia. ISBN 978-84-96467-47-7.
- Moret, Joseph de (1766). Annales del Reyno de Navarra (in Spanish). Pamplona: Imprenta de Pascual Ibáñez. OCLC 17408491.
- Pérez Celada, Julio A. (1986). Documentación del Monasterio de San Zoilo de Carrión (1047-1300) (in Spanish). Ediciones J.M. Garrido Garrido. ISBN 84-86371-09-0.
- Pérez de Urbel, Justo (1945). Historia del Condado de Castilla (in Spanish). Madrid: Consejo Superior de Investigaciones Científicas. OCLC 5661964.
- Rodríguez Lajusticia, Francisco Saulo (2019). "La presencia de las reinas Jimena y Munia, madre y esposa de Sancho III el Mayor, en sus documentos auténticos" (PDF). Príncipe de Viana (in Spanish). 80 (274): 725–751. ISSN 0032-8472.
- Salazar y Acha, Jaime de (1988). "Una hija desconocida de Sancho el Mayor" (PDF). Príncipe de Viana, Anejo (in Spanish) (8): 183–192. ISSN 1137-7054.
- Salazar y Acha, Jaime de (2006). "Urraca. Un nombre egregio en la onomástica altomedieval". En la España medieval (in Spanish). No. 1. ISSN 0214-3038.
- Sánchez Candeira, Alfonso (1999). Rosa Montero Tejada (ed.). Castilla y León en el siglo XI, estudio del reinado de Fernando I (in Spanish). Madrid: Real Academia de la Historia. ISBN 978-84-8951241-2.
- Ubieto Arteta, Antonio (1981). Cartulario de Albelda. Textos medievales 1 (in Spanish). Zaragoza: Anubar Ediciones. ISBN 978-84-7013175-2.
- Ubieto Arteta, Antonio (1976). Cartulario de San Millán de la Cogolla. Textos medievales 48 and 80 (in Spanish). Valencia: Anubar. ISBN 84-7013-082-X.

Preceded by Jimena Fernández	Queen consort of Navarre; 1010 – 1032	Succeeded by Stephanie
New title	Empress of Spain; 1034 – 1035	Succeeded by Sancha of León
