= Ernst Steindorff =

German historian (1839–1895)

Ernst Steindorff (15 June 1839 – 9 April 1895) was a German historian who was a native of Flensburg, Duchy of Schleswig.

He studied history at the Universities of Kiel, Göttingen and Berlin. From 1873 he was an associate professor of history at Göttingen, where in 1883 he became a full professor.

Steindorff is remembered as author of the two-volume Jahrbücher des Deutschen Reichs unter Heinrich III (Annals of the German Empire under Henry III) (1874–81). He also published the sixth edition of the Dahlmann-Waitz Quellenkunde der Deutschen Geschichte. Furthermore, he was the author of numerous biographies in the Allgemeine Deutsche Biographie.
