= Támara de Campos =

Coordinates: 42.200°N 4.383°W

- municipality
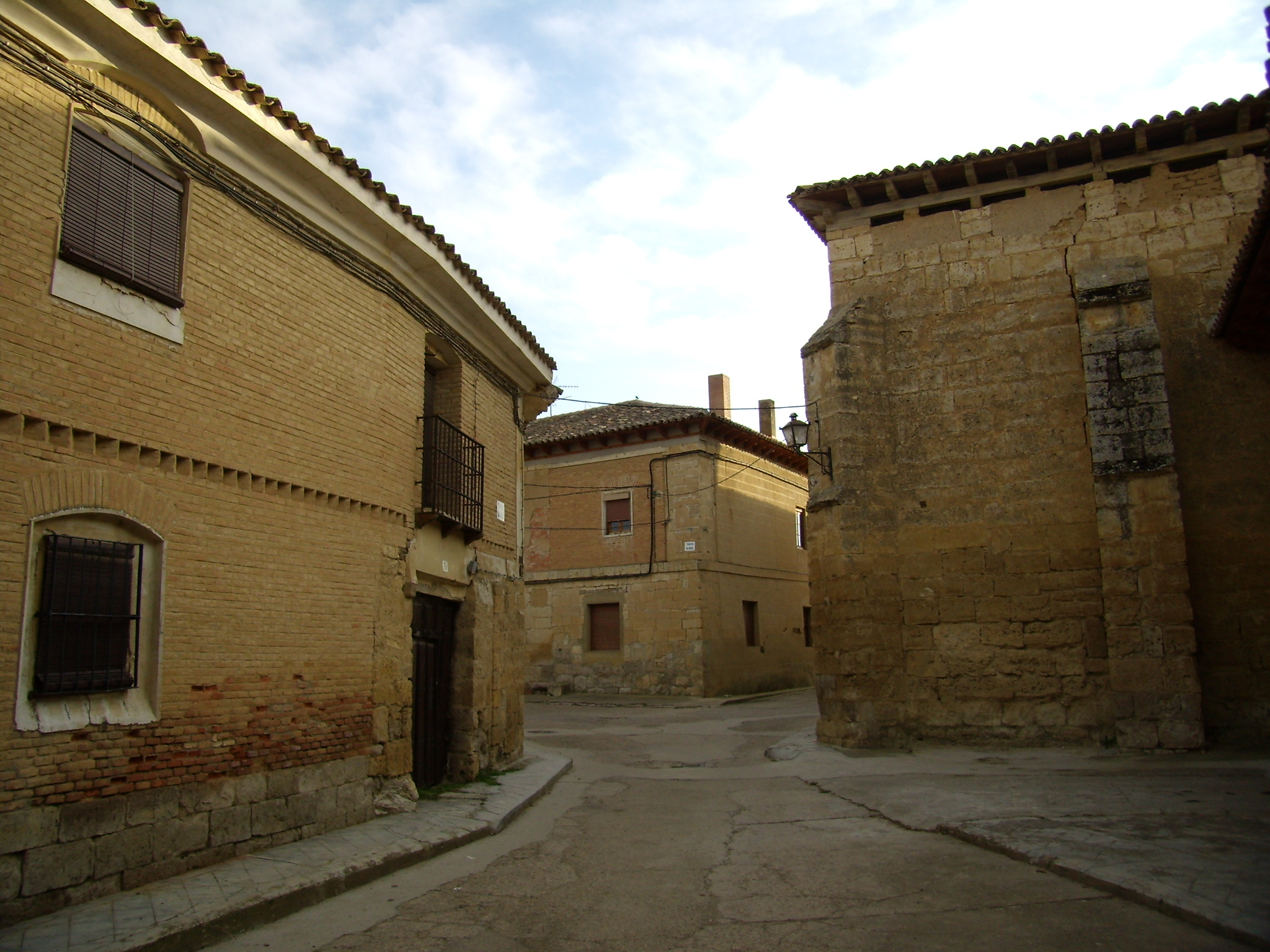
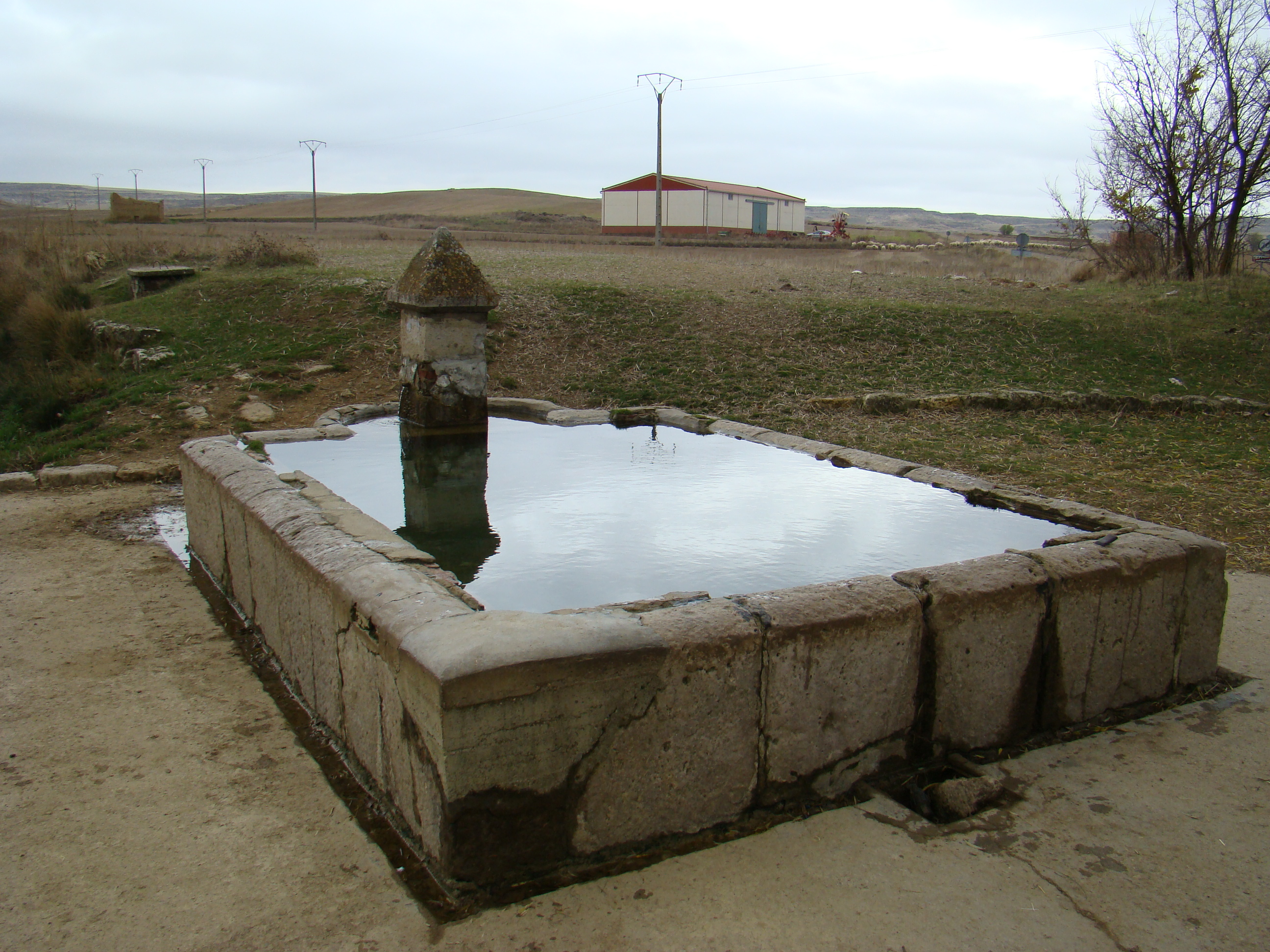
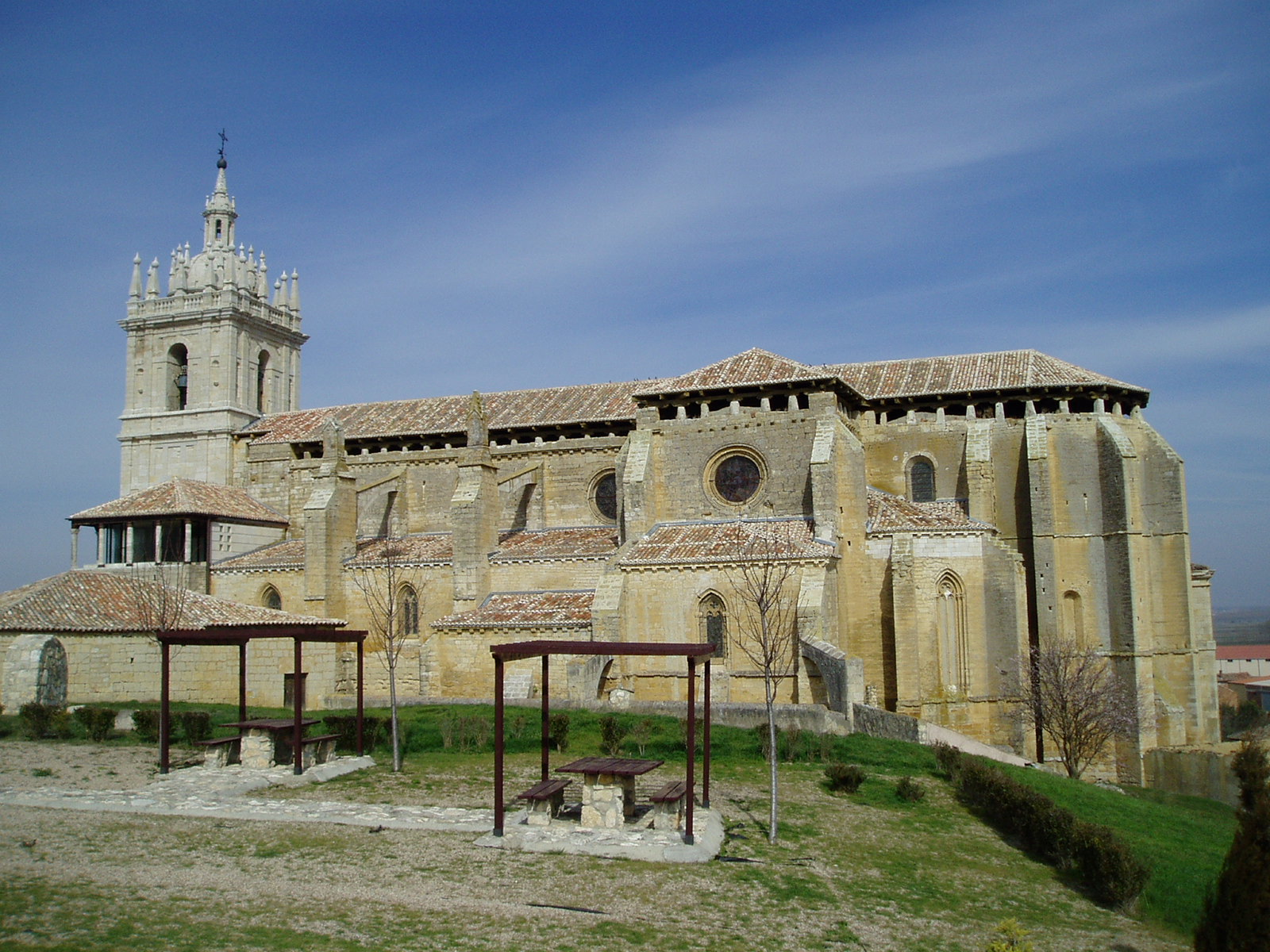
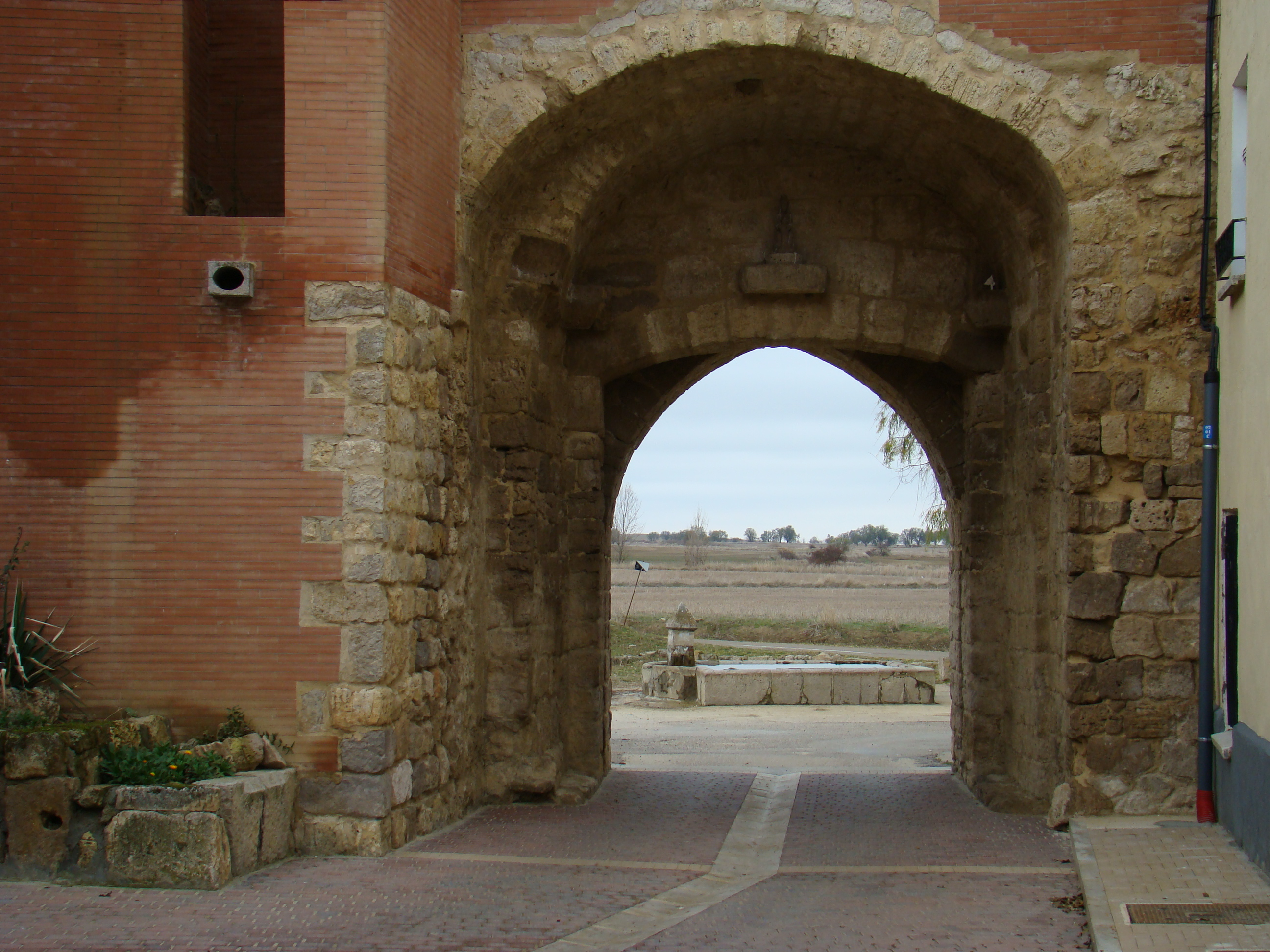
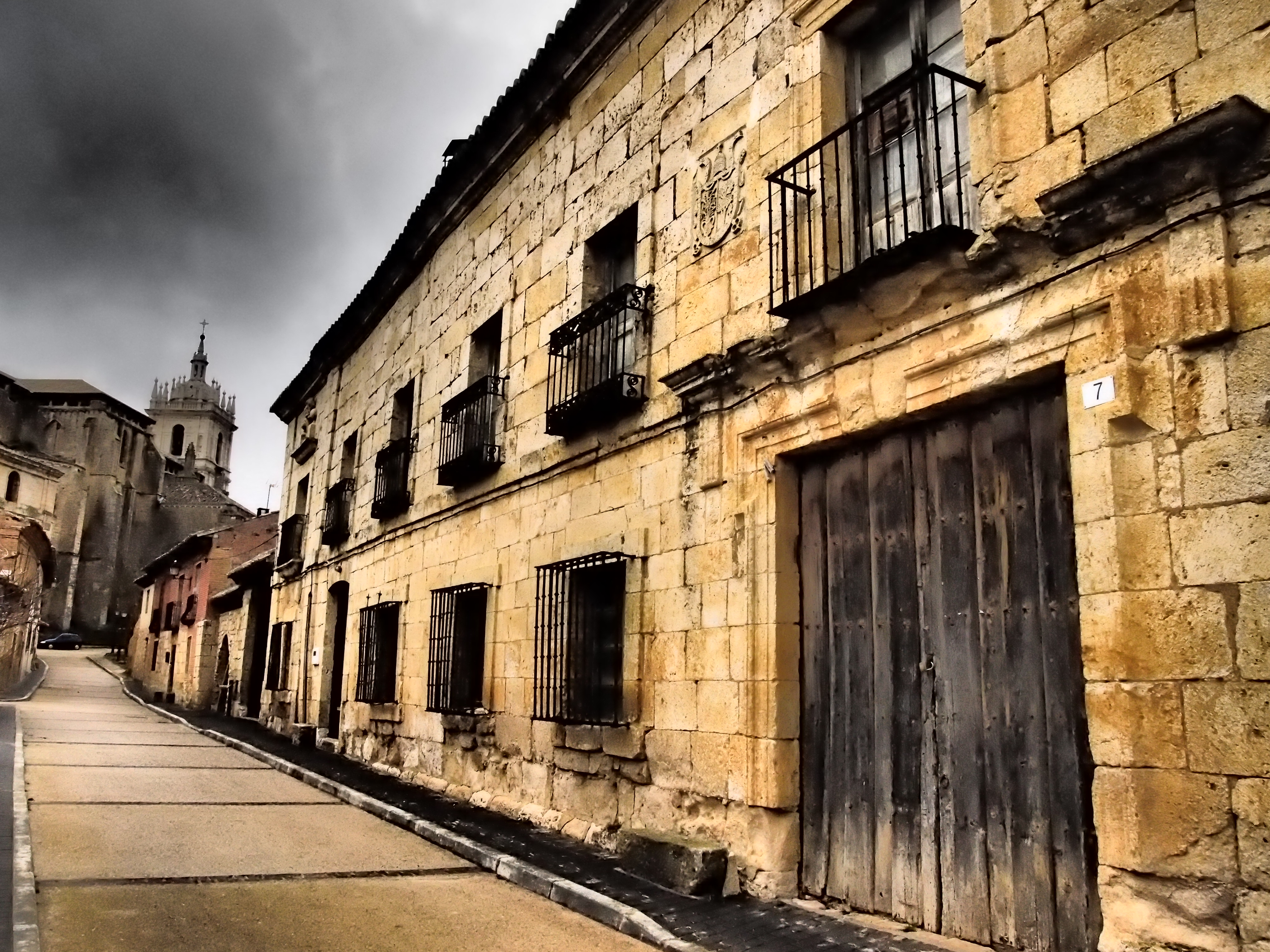
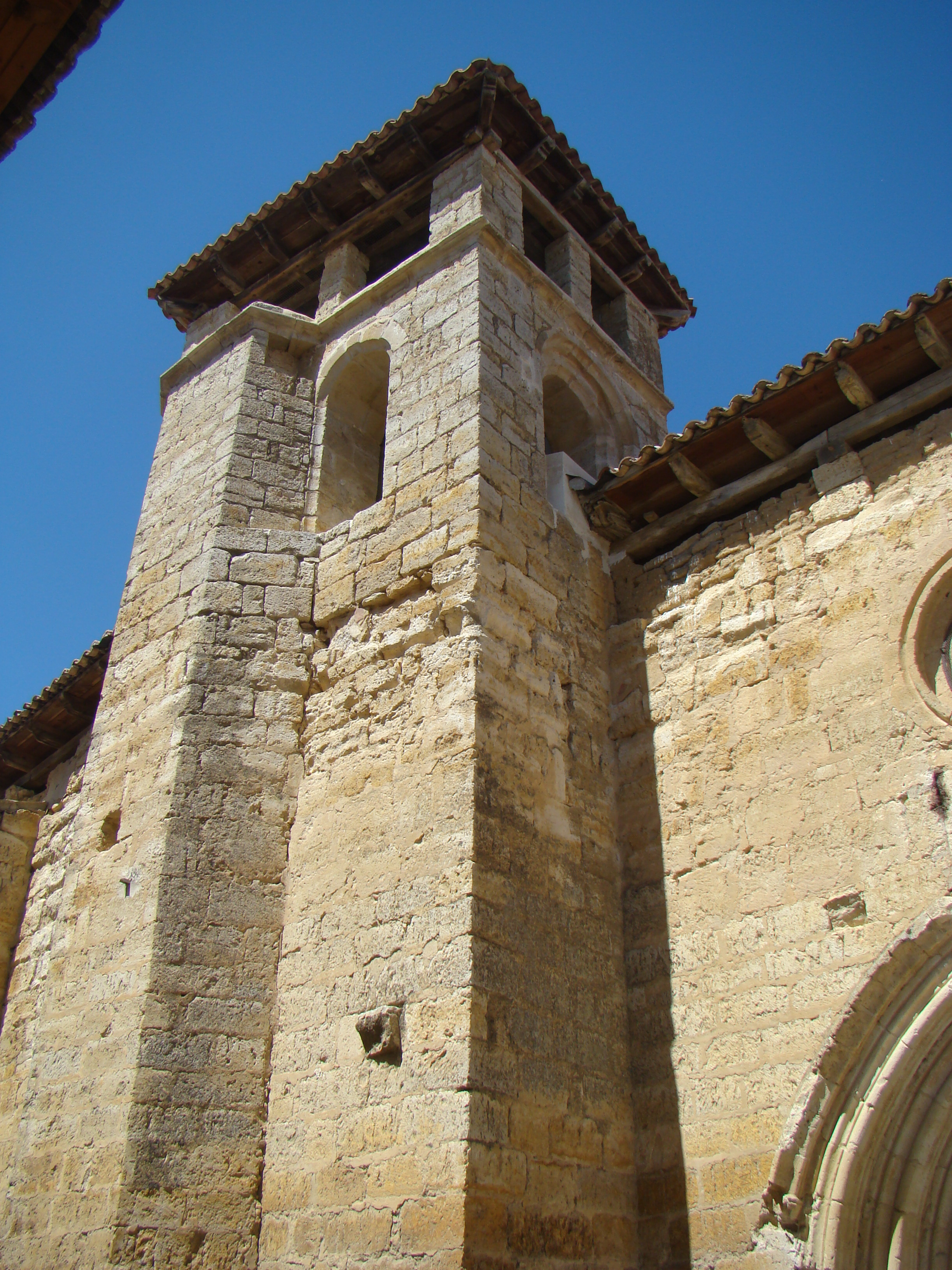
- Interactive map of Támara de Campos
- Country: Spain
- Autonomous community: Castile and León
- Province: Palencia
- Municipality: Támara de Campos

Area
  - Total: 20 km^{2} (7.7 sq mi)

Population (2025-01-01)
  - Total: 70
  - Density: 3.5/km^{2} (9.1/sq mi)
- Time zone: UTC+1 (CET)
  - Summer (DST): UTC+2 (CEST)
- Website: Official website

Támara de Campos is a municipality located in the province of Palencia, Castile and León, Spain. According to the 2004 census (INE), the municipality has a population of 93.
