= Bermudo III of León =

King of León from 1028 to 1037

Bermudo III
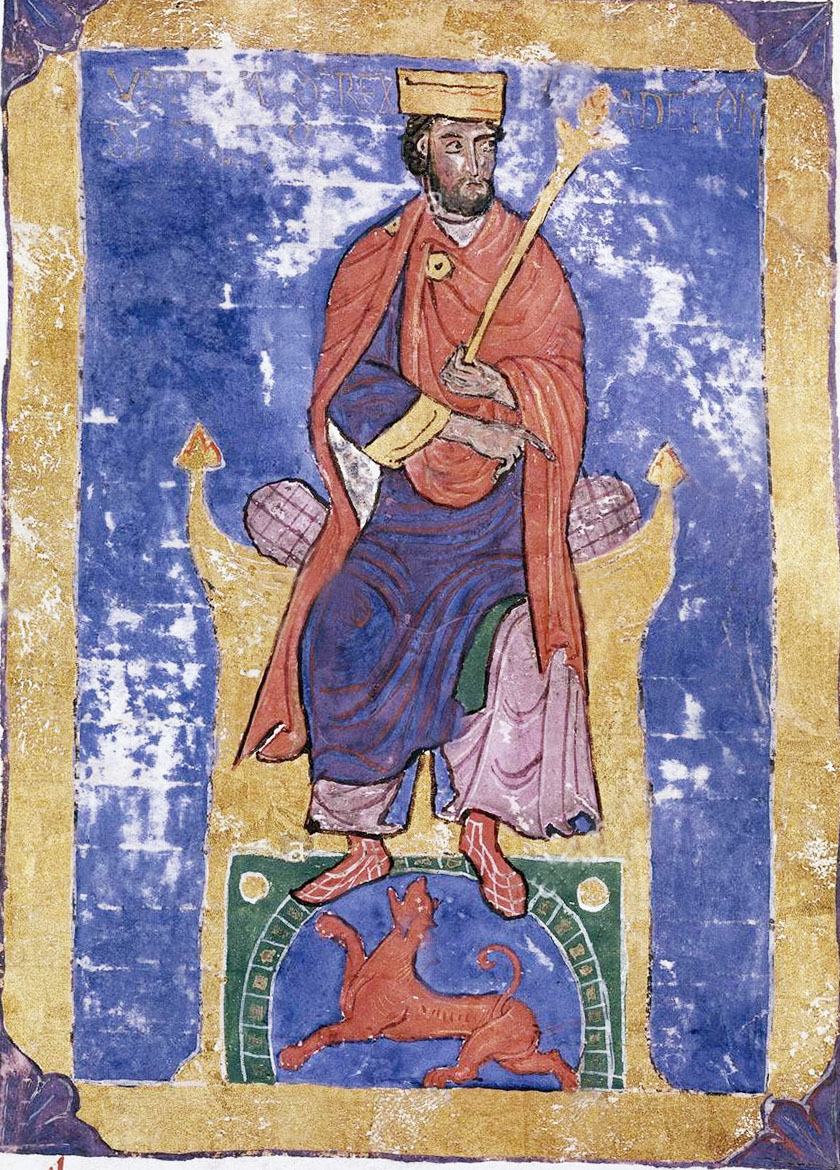
- Miniature from Tumbo A, c. 1129–1255

King of León
- Reign: 1028–1037
- Predecessor: Alfonso V
- Successor: Ferdinand I
- Born: c. 1015
- Died: 4 September 1037 (aged 22); Tamarón
- Burial: Basilica of San Isidoro later Santa María la Real of Nájera
- Consort: Jimena Sánchez
- Issue: Alfonso
Names
- Bermudo Alfónsez
- Dynasty: Astur-Leonese dynasty
- Father: Alfonso V of León
- Mother: Elvira Menéndez
- Religion: Chalcedonian Christianity

Bermudo III or Vermudo III (c. 1015 – 4 September 1037) was the king of León from 1028 until his death. He was a son of Alfonso V of León by his first wife Elvira Menéndez, and was the last scion of Peter of Cantabria to rule in the Leonese kingdom. Like several of his predecessors, he sometimes carried the imperial title: in 1030 he appears as regni imperii Ueremundo principis; in 1029/1032 as imperator domnus Veremudius in Gallecia; and in 1034 as regni imperii Veremundus rex Legionensis. He was a child when he succeeded his father. In 1034 he was chased from his throne by King Sancho III of Pamplona and forced to take refuge in Galicia. He returned to power, but was defeated and killed fighting against his brother-in-law, Ferdinand of Castile, in the battle of Tamarón.

== History ==
Signature of Bermudo III

Bermudo III was the son of Alfonso V of León by his first wife Elvira Menéndez. He succeeded to the throne of León in 1027. Bermudo married Jimena Sánchez, who was a daughter of King Sancho III of Pamplona.

In 1029, Count García Sánchez of Castile was about to be married to Sancha of León, the elder sister of Bermudo, an arrangement apparently sanctioned by the king of Navarre, when the count was murdered in the city of León by the Velas, a party of Castilian nobles exiled from their own country, who had taken refuge in León. León and Navarre disputed the succession to the Countship of Castile thus left vacant.

Sancho III of Pamplona was married to Muniadona, daughter of Sancho García of Castile, and sister to the murdered count. Sancho claimed the county of Castile in his wife's name and installed in it their son, Ferdinand, as the new count of Castile. He seized the borderlands between the Cea and the Pisuerga rivers, right above León's capital, long a bone of contention between León and Castile. In 1032 Sancho of Pamplona forced a marriage between his son, Fernando of Castile, and Sancha of León, and those lands went to Castile as part of her dowry.

In 1034, Sancho wrested the city of León itself from his son-in-law, Bermudo, who retreated into Galicia. By the time Sancho died in 1035, the meseta north of the Duero was dominated by the Pyrenean pocket kingdom of Navarre. After Sancho's death, Bermudo III was immediately received back into León and soon began a campaign to recover the disputed territory between the Cea and Pisuerga from Castile and his brother-in-law Ferdinand. Bermudo III was killed at the Battle of Tamarón on 4 September 1037. Autopsy of his remains shows that he may have suffered death from infantry spears or pikes, after falling from his horse.

Since the latter died without an heir, the kingdom of León now recognized Sancha and her husband as its rulers, and Ferdinand was anointed king in the royal city on 22 June 1038. The united realm of León and Castile, with its rimlands of Asturias and Galicia, would become the political center of the north Iberian Christian society.

== Marriage ==
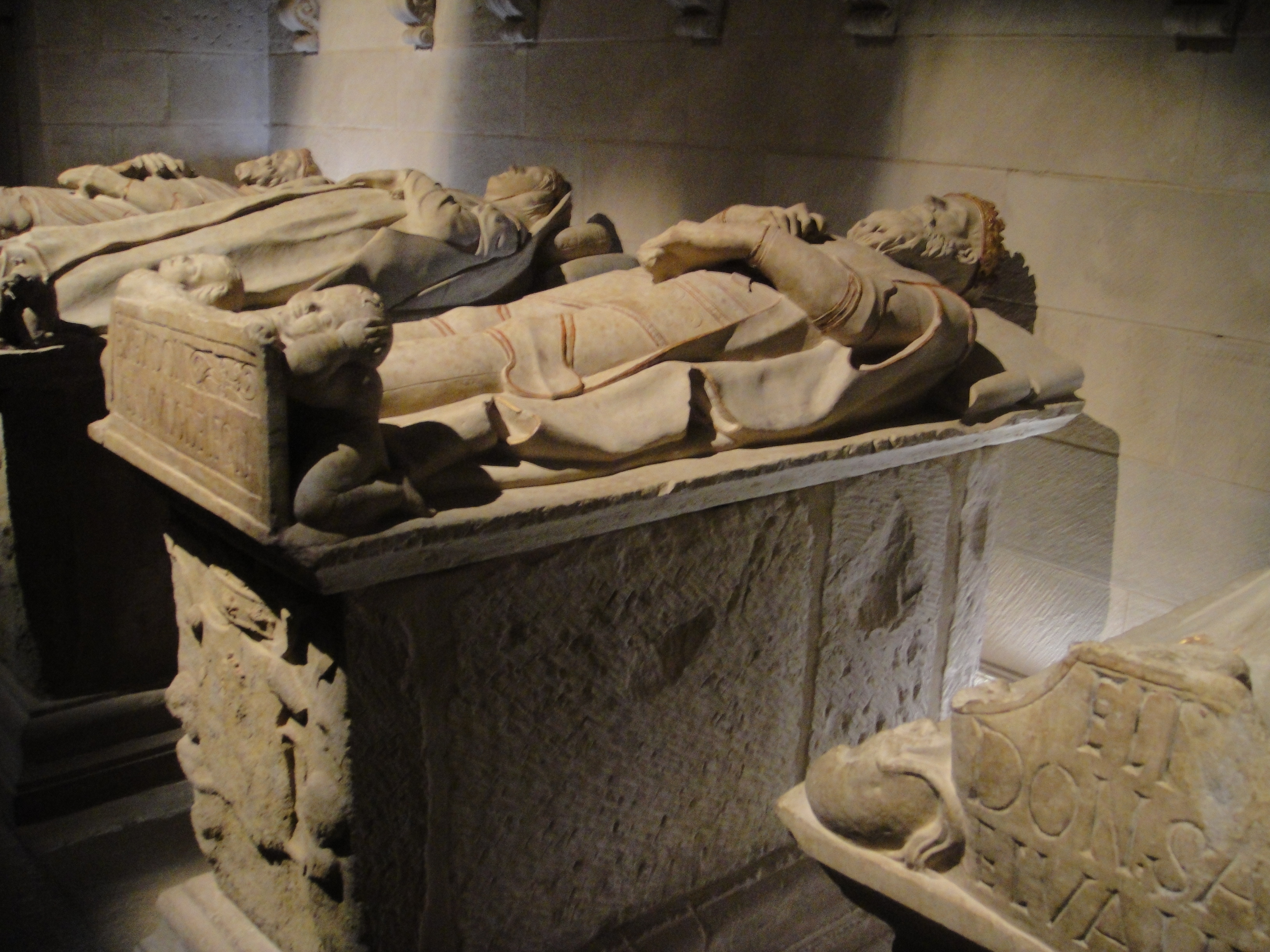
The tomb of Bermudo III of León in Nájera.

By his wife Jimena, daughter of Sancho III of Pamplona, Bermudo had one child, a son named Alfonso, who was born and died in 1030.

== See also ==
- Labio Castle

== Bibliography ==
- González Jiménez, Manuel (2011). "La idea de imperio antes y después de Alfonso VI". Alfonso VI Imperator totius orbis Hispanie (in Spanish). Fernando Suárez y Andrés Gambra, coord. Madrid: Sanz y Torres. ISBN 978-84-92948-45-1.
- Pérez de Urbel, Justo; Del Arco y Garay, Ricardo (1964). España cristiana, comienzo de la reconquista (711-I038). Historia de España. Vol. 6 (2 ed.). Madrid: Espasa-Calpe.
- Portass, Robert (2017). The Village World of Early Medieval Northern Spain: Local Community and the Land Market. Boydell.
- Reilly, Bernard F. (1998). The Kingdom of León-Castilla under King Alfonso VI. Philadelphia: University of Pennsylvania Press. ISBN 9788487103032.
- Salazar y Acha, Jaime de (1988). "Una hija desconocida de Sancho el Mayor". Revista Príncipe de Viana (in Spanish) (Anejo). Pamplona: Institución Príncipe de Viana: 183–192. ISSN 1137-7054.

Bermudo III of León Astur-Leonese dynasty Born: circa 1017 Died: 4 September 1037
Regnal titles
Preceded by Alfonso V	King of León; 1027–1037	Succeeded by Ferdinand I
