= Tamarón =

Coordinates: 42°16′N 3°59′W

- Municipality and town
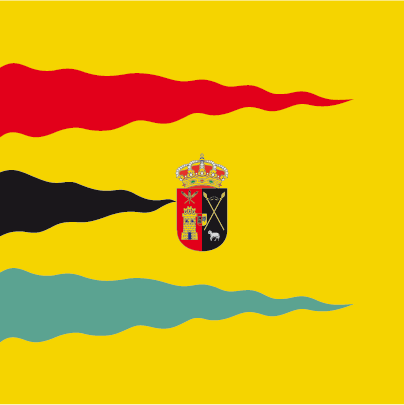
- Flag Coat of arms
- Interactive map of Tamarón
- Country: Spain
- Autonomous community: Castile and León
- Province: Burgos
- Comarca: Odra-Pisuerga

Area
  - Total: 15 km^{2} (5.8 sq mi)

Population (2025-01-01)
  - Total: 52
  - Density: 3.5/km^{2} (9.0/sq mi)
- Time zone: UTC+1 (CET)
  - Summer (DST): UTC+2 (CEST)
- Postal code: 09227
- Website: http://www.tamaron.es/

Tamarón is a municipality and town located in the province of Burgos, Castile and León, Spain. According to the 2004 census (INE), the municipality has a population of 46.

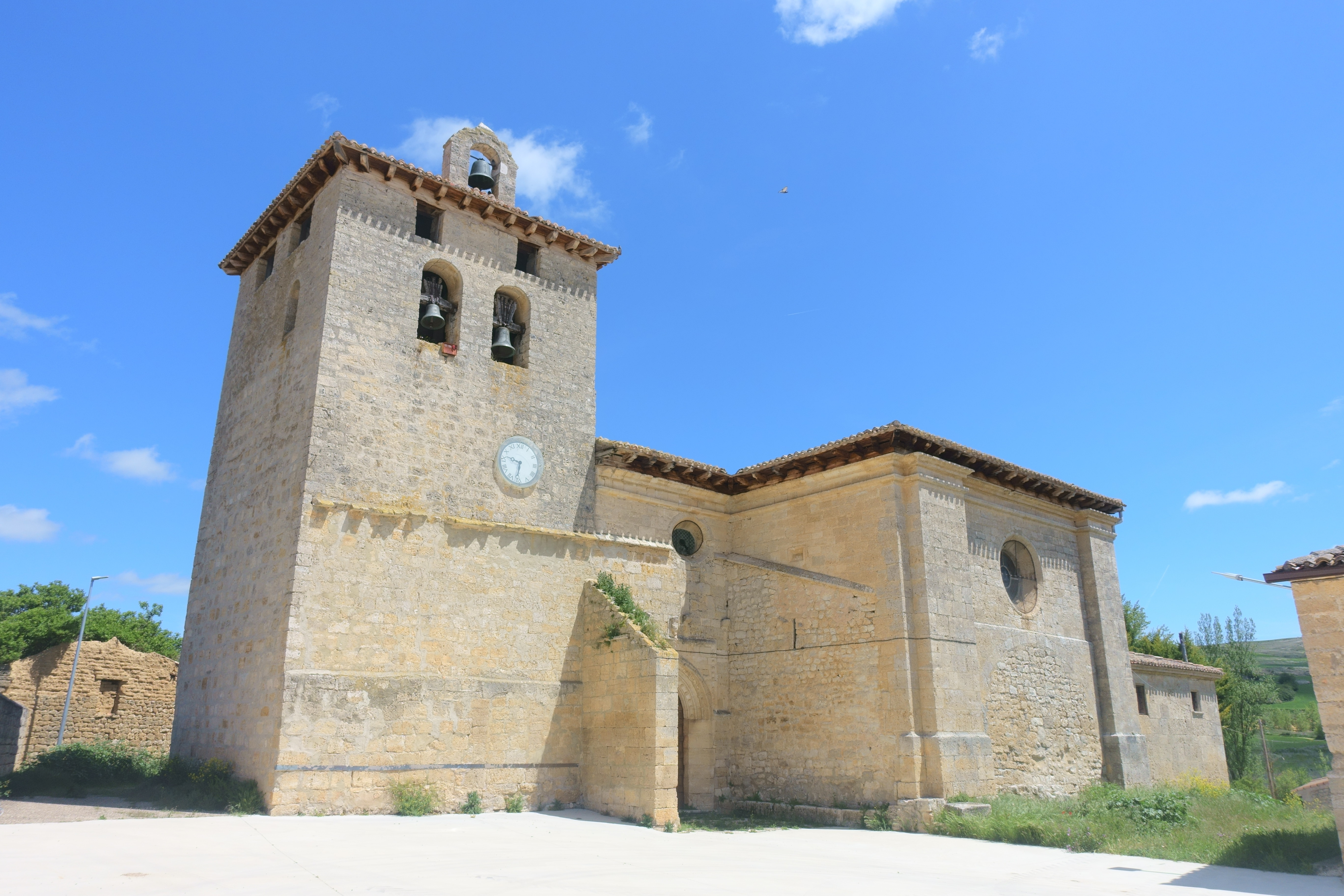
Church of the Assumption in Tamarón
