= Kingdom of Nájera =

Medieval Spanish kingdom

The kingdoms of Nájera (under Castilian rule) and Navarre under Sancho VI of Navarre (1154–1194)

The Kingdom of Nájera was a kingdom located in the north of the Iberian Peninsula, founded in the year 923.

== History ==
The origins of the Kingdom of Nájera date back to 918 when King Sancho Garcés I of Pamplona, in collaboration with Ordoño II of León, recovered Nájera and the Middle and Upper Rioja (from present-day Miranda de Ebro to Tudela) from Muslim rule. He placed these new territories under the rule of his son, García Sánchez, under the name "Kingdom of Nájera".

Following the destruction of Pamplona by Abd al-Rahman III in 924 and the death of his father the following year, García Sánchez also became King of Pamplona, moving his residence to Nájera and establishing his court there, to the detriment of Pamplona. From that moment on, the kingdoms of Pamplona and Nájera appear linked to the same monarch, although they continue to maintain separate identities; therefore, the kingdom comes to be called the "Kingdom of Nájera-Pamplona".

After the murder of Sancho IV of Pamplona in 1076, the Kingdom of Nájera was annexed by Alfonso VI of León and Castile. The Kingdom of Nájera continued to exist as a political entity, being one of the several states ruled by the Castilian monarchs, as evidenced by numerous documents that express the list of titles of the Kings of Castile until as late as 1239.
