= List of Leonese royal consorts =

This is a list of the royal consort of the Kingdom of León.

It is, in part, a continuation of the list of Asturian royal consorts.

== Royal Consorts of León ==
=== House of Alfonso ===
Picture	Name	Father	Birth	Marriage	Became Consort	Ceased to be Consort	Death	Spouse
	Muniadona	a count of Bierzo	-	847	1 January 850 husband's death	27 May 866 husband's death	-	Ordoño I
	Jimena of Pamplona	(probably); García Íñiguez of Pamplona (Íñiguez)	848	869/870		20 December 910 husband's death	after June 912	Alfonso III
	Muniadona Nuñez of Castile	(perhaps); Nuño Fernández de Amaia, Count of Castile	-	before 910	20 December 910 husband's ascession	19 January 914 husband's death	-	García I
	Elvira Menéndez	Hermengildo Gutierrez, Count of Coimbra	864–875	890–900	19 January 914 husband's ascession	8 September/October 921		Ordoño II
	Aragonta Gonzalez	Count Gonzalo Betotez (Betotez)	-	February 922		before 923 repudiated	956	Ordoño II
	Sancha Sánchez of Pamplona	Sancho I of Pamplona (Jiménez)	after 900	February–March 923		June 924 husband's death	9 June 952 or 26 December 955/959	Ordoño II
	Urraca bint 'Abd Allah	'Abd Allah ibn Muhammad al-Qasawi (Banu Qasi)	-	913/917	June 924 husband's accession	July 925 husband's death	-	Fruela II
	Oneca Sánchez of Pamplona	Sancho I of Pamplona (Jiménez)	-	923	July 925 husband's accession	June 931		Alfonso IV
	Urraca Sánchez of Pamplona	Sancho I of Pamplona (Jiménez)	915	932–934		1 January 951 husband's death	23 June 956	Ramiro II
	Urraca Fernández of Castile	Fernán González, Count of Castile	920/935	944/951	January 951 husband's ascession	956 repudiated	1007	Ordoño III
	Urraca Fernández of Castile	Fernán González, Count of Castile	920/935	before 18 November 958		960 husband's desposition	1007	Ordoño IV
	Teresa Ansúrez of Castile	Ansur Fernández, Count of Castile	-	before 26 April 960		December 966 husband's death	after 997	Sancho I
	Sancha Gómez of Saldaña	Gómez Diaz, Count of Saldaña (Banu Gómez)	-	before January 979		after 983		Ramiro III
	Velasquita Ramírez	Ramiro Menéndez (Betotez)	-	before 29 September 985		after 24 December 988 repudiated	after 1030	Bermudo II
	Elvira García of Castile	García Fernández, Count of Castile	965	991		September 999 husband's death	December 1017	Bermudo II
	Elvira Menéndez	Menendo González, Count of Portucale (Betotez)	996	1010–1015		20 December 1022		Alfonso V
	Urraca Garcés of Pamplona	García Sánchez II of Pamplona (Jiménez)	-	1023		4 July/7 August 1028 husband's death	after 6 August 1031	Alfonso V
	Jimena Sánchez of Navarre	Sancho III of Pamplona (Jiménez)	-	23 January 1034 – 17 February 1035		4 September 1037 husband's death	after 23 December 1062	Bermudo III

=== House of Jiménez ===
Picture	Name	Father	Birth	Marriage	Became Consort	Ceased to be Consort	Death	Spouse
	Sancha of León	Alfonso V of León (Astur-Leonese)	1013	November–December 1032	4 September 1037 husband's ascession	24 June 1065 husband's death	27 November 1067	Ferdinand I
	Agnes of Aquitaine	William VIII, Duke of Aquitaine (Ramnulfids)	1059	1069 or late 1073/early 1074		January 1072 husband's deposition	1077–1093 or after 1099	Alfonso VI
	Alberta	-	-	late 1070/before 26 March 1071	12 January 1072 husband's accession	7 October 1072 husband's death	-	Sancho II
	Agnes of Aquitaine (2nd time)	William VIII, Duke of Aquitaine (Ramnulfids)	1059	1069 or late 1073/early 1074	October 1072 husband's restoration	after 22 May 1077 divorce	1077–1093 or after 1099	Alfonso VI (2nd time)
	Constance of Burgundy	Robert I, Duke of Burgundy (Burgundy)	8 May 1045	December 1079 or 8 May 1080		25 July/25 October 1093		Alfonso VI (2nd time)
	Bertha	-	-	December 1094 or April 1095		1099–1100		Alfonso VI (2nd time)
	Isabel	-	-	1100, before 14 May		1107, after 14 May		Alfonso VI (2nd time)
	Beatrice	-	-	April/May 1108		1 July 1109 husband's death	1110	Alfonso VI (2nd time)
	Alfonso I of Aragon	Sancho Ramírez of Aragon and Navarre (Jiménez)	1073–1074	October 1109		1115 marriage annulled	7 September 1134	Urraca

=== House of Burgundy ===
Picture	Name	Father	Birth	Marriage	Became Consort	Ceased to be Consort	Death	Spouse
	Berenguela of Barcelona	Ramon Berenguer III, Count of Barcelona (Barcelona)	1116	November 1128		15/31 January 1149		Alfonso VII
	Richeza of Poland	Władysław II the Exile (Piast)	1130–1140	October/December 1152		21 August 1157 husband's death	16 June 1185	Alfonso VII
	Urraca of Portugal	Afonso I of Portugal (Burgundy)	1151	May/June 1165		1175 marriage dissolved by the Pope	16 October 1188	Ferdinand II
	Teresa Fernández de Traba	Count Fernando of Trava, Lord of Trastamara	-	before 7 October 1178		7 February 1180		Ferdinand II
	Urraca López de Haro	Count Lope Díaz de Haro, Lord of Biscay	-	May 1185 or 1187		22 January 1188 husband's death	1223 or after 1226	Ferdinand II
	Teresa of Portugal	Sancho I of Portugal (Burgundy)	1176–1181	15 February 1191		1194–8 marriage dissolved by the Pope	17/18 June 1250	Alfonso IX
	Berengaria of Castile	Alfonso VIII of Castile (Anscarids)	1 June 1180	17 December 1197 or 1198		1204, before 19 June marriage dissolved by the Pope	8 November 1246	Alfonso IX

Picture	Coat of Arms	Name	Father	Birth	Marriage	Became Consort	Ceased to be Consort	Death	Spouse
		Beatriz of Swabia	Philip of Swabia (Hohenstaufen)	March/May 1205	30 November 1219		5 November 1235		Ferdinand III
		Jeanne of Dammartin	Simon of Dammartin (Dammartin)	1220	1237, before 20 November		30 May 1252 husband's death	16 March 1279	Ferdinand III
		Violant of Aragon	James I of Aragon (Barcelona)	1236	26 December 1246	30 May 1252 husband's ascession	4 April 1284 husband's death	1301	Alfonso X
		María of Molina	Alfonso of Leon, Lord of Molina (Anscarids)	1264–1265	July 1281–1282	4 April 1284 husband's ascession	25 April 1295 husband's death	1 July 1321	Sancho IV
		Constance of Portugal	Denis of Portugal (Burgundy)	3 January 1290	23 January 1302		7 September 1312 husband's death	18 November 1313	Ferdinand IV
		Constance of Peñafiel	Juan Manuel of Castile, Prince of Villena (Anscarids)	1315–1323	28 November 1325		1327–1328 marriage annulled	13 November 1345	Alfonso XI
		Maria of Portugal	Afonso IV of Portugal (Burgundy)	9 February 1313	24 June/September 1328		26/27 March 1350 husband's death	18 January 1357	Alfonso XI
		Blanca of Bourbon	Peter I, Duke of Bourbon (Bourbon)	end 1339	3 July 1353		14 May/31 July 1361		Peter

=== House of Trastámara ===
Picture	Coat of Arms	Name	Father	Birth	Marriage	Became Consort	Ceased to be Consort	Death	Spouse
		Juana Manuel of Castile	Juan Manuel of Castile, Prince of Villena (Anscarids)	1339	27 July 1350	23 March 1369 husband's ascession	29 May 1379 husband's death	27 March 1381	Henry II
		Eleanor of Aragon	Peter IV of Aragon (Barcelona)	20 January 1358	18 June 1375	29 May 1379 husband's ascession	13 August 1382		John I
		Beatrice of Portugal	Ferdinand I of Portugal (Burgundy)	9 December 1372	17 May 1383		9 October 1390 husband's death	8 March 1408	John I
		Catherine of Lancaster	John of Gaunt, 1st Duke of Lancaster (Lancaster)	31 March 1373	17 September 1388	9 October 1390 husband's ascession	25 December 1406 husband's death	2 June 1418	Henry III
		Maria of Aragon	Ferdinand I of Aragon (Trastamara)	1396	1418 or 4 August 1420		18 February 1445		John II
		Isabella of Portugal	John, Constable of Portugal (Aviz)	1428	22 July 1447		20 July 1454 husband's death	15 August 1496	John II
		Joan of Portugal	Edward of Portugal (Aviz)	20 March 1439	21 May 1455		11 December 1474 husband's death	12 December 1475	Henry IV

Ferdinand II of Aragon (1452–1516), husband of Queen Isabella of Castile and León, and Philip of Habsburg (1478–1506), husband of Queen Joanna of Castile and León, were kings of the Crown of Castile-León.

=== House of Habsburg ===
Picture	Coat of Arms	Name	Father	Birth	Marriage	Became Consort	Ceased to be Consort	Death	Spouse
		Isabella of Portugal	Manuel I of Portugal (Aviz)	24 October 1503	11 March 1526		1 May 1539		Charles I

At 1556, the union of the Spanish kingdoms is generally called Spain and Mary I of England (consort of King Philip II) is the first Queen Consort of Spain.

== See also ==
- List of Hispanic consorts
- List of Castilian consorts
- List of Galician consorts
- List of Aragonese consorts
- List of Asturian consorts
- List of Galician monarchs
- List of Leonese monarchs
- List of Navarrese consorts
- List of Spanish consorts
- List of consorts of Portugal
