= Queen Elvira =

Queen Elvira may refer to:

- Elvira Menéndez (died 921), wife of King Ordoño II of Galicia and León
- Elvira Menéndez (died 1022), wife of King Alfonso V of León
- Elvira of Castile, Queen of León (c. 978–1017), wife of King Bermudo II of León
- Elvira of Castile, Queen of Sicily (c. 1100–1135), wife of King Roger II of Sicily

== See also ==
- Elvira of Castile (disambiguation)
- Elvira of León (disambiguation)
- Infanta Elvira (disambiguation)
