= Urraca =

Urraca (also spelled Hurraca, Urracha and Hurracka in medieval Latin) is a female first name.

In modern Spanish, the word "urraca" means magpie, derived perhaps from Latin furax, meaning "thievish", in reference to the magpie's tendency to collect shiny items.

Onomastic analysis however suggests that the name Urraca is of Basque origin, and bears a meaning different from magpie. In the Basque language, Urraca means "Golden", from Urre- (gold) and -ako(a) (of/from). The Basque word "urre(a)" itself appears to be a borrowing either from the celtic word or (or orr/aur), or from its Latin cognate aureum, both of which mean gold, so that the name "Urraca" would be a calque of the more usual Latin names of Auria or Oria, both derived aurum and meaning "golden" as well.

- Urraca (9th century), purported wife of García Íñiguez of Pamplona
- Urraca bint Qasi (fl. 917–929), wife of Fruela II of León
- Urraca Sánchez of Pamplona (10th century), wife of Ramiro II of León
- Urraca Fróilaz (fl. 969–978), wife of Aznar Purcelliz
- Urraca Garcés (died before 1008), wife of Fernán González of Castile and William II Sánchez of Gascony
- Urraca Fernández (died 1005/7), wife of Ordoño III of León, Ordoño IV of León and of Sancho II of Pamplona
- Urraca of Covarrubias (died 1038), abbess and daughter of García Fernández of Castile
- Urraca, apparently Gómez (died 1039), wife of Sancho García of Castile
- Urraca Sánchez (died 1041), wife of Sancho VI William of Gascony
- Urraca Sánchez (11th century), wife of Alfonso V of León
- Urraca of Zamora (1033/4–1101), daughter of King Ferdinand I of León.
- Urraca of León and Castile (Urraca the Reckless) (1082–1129), Queen of León and Castile, daughter of Alfonso VI, wife of Alfonso I of Aragon, mother of Alfonso VII
- Urraca Henriques (1097-1173) - Infanta of Portugal and sister of Afonso Henriques
- Urraca of Castile, Queen of Navarre (Urraca the Asturian) (1132–1164), daughter of Alfonso VII of León and Castile, and queen consort of García Ramírez of Navarre
- Urraca of Portugal (1151–1188), daughter of Afonso I of Portugal and wife of King Ferdinand II of León
- Urraca of Castile, Queen of Portugal (1186/1187–1220), daughter of Alfonso VIII of Castile and Leonor of England
- Princess Urraca of Bourbon-Two Sicilies (1913–1999), daughter of Prince Ferdinand Pius, Duke of Calabria (1869–1960) and his wife Princess Maria Ludwiga Theresia of Bavaria (1872–1954)

== Disambiguation ==
Urraca may also refer to:

- Urraca Mesa, a mesa in northern New Mexico on the property of Philmont Scout Ranch, which is the most lightning-struck place in the state and has religious significance to a number of local indigenous tribes
- Urracá, indigenous freedom fighter of colonial Panama
- Urracá, Panama, a corregimiento in Panama
- Urraca, a planned, but cancelled, very high altitude (above 1000 kilometers) nuclear test in the Operation Fishbowl series in 1962.
