= List of Castilian consorts =

Spouses of Castilian monarchs

This is a list of the queens consort and kings consort of the Kingdom of Castile, and later, Crown of Castile.

It is, in part, a continuation of the list of Asturian royal consorts and the list of Leonese royal consorts.

== Countesses ==
=== House of Muniadona ===
Picture	Name	Father	Birth	Marriage	Became Consort	Ceased to be Consort	Death	Spouse
	Sancha Sánchez of Pamplona	Sancho I of Pamplona (Jiménez)	-	c. 932		c. 944 husband's imprisonment	December 959	Fernán González

=== Banu Ansúrez ===
Picture	Name	Father	Birth	Marriage	Became Consort	Ceased to be Consort	Death	Spouse
	Gontroda Nuñez of Biscay	Munio Vélaz II of Biscay (Biscay)	-	-	-	-	-	Ansur Fernández

=== Banu Mamaduna ===
Picture	Name	Father	Birth	Marriage	Became Consort	Ceased to be Consort	Death	Spouse
	Sancha Sánchez of Pamplona	Sancho I of Pamplona (Jiménez)	-	May 932 – August 935	c. 947 husband's reinstatement	aft. 4 December 959		Fernán González
	Urraca Garces of Pamplona	García Sánchez I of Pamplona (Jiménez)	-	bef. 5 May 964		bef. 1 March 970 husband's death	bef. 1008	Fernán González
	Ava of Ribagorza	Raymond II, Count of Ribagorza (Pallars-Ribagorza)	-	-	970 or after	-	-	García Fernández
	Urraca Gómez	Gómez Díaz, Count of Saldaña (Banu Gómez)	-	c. 995	c. 995	1017 husband's death	1039	Sancho García
	Sancha of León	Alfonso V of León (Astur-Leonese)	1013	November–December 1032		4 September 1037 became queen	27 November 1067	Ferdinand I

== Queens and Kings ==
=== House of Jiménez ===
Picture	Name	Father	Birth	Marriage	Became Consort	Ceased to be Consort	Death	Spouse
	Sancha of León	Alfonso V of León (Astur-Leonese)	1013	November–December 1032	4 September 1037 husband's ascession as king	24 June 1065 husband's death	27 November 1067	Ferdinand I
	Alberta	-	-	late 1070/before 26 March 1071		7 October 1072 husband's death	-	Sancho II
	Agnes of Aquitaine	William VIII, Duke of Aquitaine (Ramnulfids)	1059	1069 or late 1073/early 1074	7 October 1072 husband's ascension or late 1073/early 1074 marriage	after 22 May 1077 divorce or death	1077 or 1093 or after 1109	Alfonso VI
	Constance of Burgundy	Robert I, Duke of Burgundy (Burgundy)	1045	December 1079 or 8 May 1080		25 July/25 October 1093		Alfonso VI
	Bertha	-	-	December 1094 or April 1095		1099–1100		Alfonso VI
	Isabel	-	-	1100, before 14 May		1107, after 14 May		Alfonso VI
	Beatrice	William VIII, Duke of Aquitaine (allegedly)	-	April/May 1108		1 July 1109 husband's death	-	Alfonso VI

=== House of Ivrea ===
Picture	Name	Father	Birth	Marriage	Became consort	Ceased to be consort	Death	Spouse
	Berengaria of Barcelona	Ramon Berenguer III, Count of Barcelona (Barcelona)	1116	November 1128		15/31 January 1149		Alfonso VII
	Richeza of Poland	Władysław II the Exile (Piast)	1130/1140	October/December 1152		21 August 1157 husband's death	16 June 1185	Alfonso VII
	Blanche of Navarre; Queen of Nájera or junior Queen of Castile	García Ramírez of Navarre (Jiménez)	1137	30 January 1151		12 August 1156		Sancho III
	Eleanor of England	Henry II of England (Plantagenet)	13 October 1162	September 1177		5 October 1214 husband's death	31 October 1214	Alfonso VIII
	Mafalda of Portugal	Sancho I of Portugal (Burgundy)	1194/7	1215, before 29 August		1216 marriage dissolved	1 May 1256	Henry I
	Elisabeth of Swabia	Philip of Swabia (Hohenstaufen)	March/May 1205	November 1219		5 November 1235		Ferdinand III
	Joan, Countess of Ponthieu	Simon of Dammartin (Dammartin)	1220	1237, before 20 November		30 May 1252 husband's death	16 March 1279	Ferdinand III
	Violant of Aragon	James I of Aragon (Barcelona)	1236	26 December 1246	30 May 1252 husband's ascession	4 April 1284 husband's death	1301	Alfonso X
	María of Molina	Alfonso of Leon, Lord of Molina (Anscarids)	1264/1265	July 1281/1282	4 April 1284 husband's ascession	25 April 1295 husband's death	1 July 1321	Sancho IV
	Constance of Portugal	Denis of Portugal (Burgundy)	3 January 1290	23 January 1302		7 September 1312 husband's death	18 November 1313	Ferdinand IV
	Constance of Peñafiel	Juan Manuel of Castile, Prince of Villena (Anscarids)	1315–1323	28 November 1325		1327/1328 marriage annulled	13 November 1345	Alfonso XI
	Maria of Portugal	Afonso IV of Portugal (Burgundy)	9 February 1313	24 June/September 1328		26/27 March 1350 husband's death	18 January 1357	Alfonso XI
	Blanche of Bourbon	Peter I, Duke of Bourbon (Bourbon)	end 1339	3 July 1353		14 May/31 July 1361		Peter

=== House of Trastámara ===
Picture	Name	Father	Birth	Marriage	Became Consort	Ceased to be Consort	Death	Spouse
	Juana Manuel of Castile	Juan Manuel of Castile, Prince of Villena (Anscarids)	1339	27 July 1350	23 March 1369 husband's ascession	29 May 1379 husband's death	27 March 1381	Henry II
	Eleanor of Aragon	Peter IV of Aragon (Barcelona)	20 January 1358	18 June 1375	29 May 1379 husband's ascession	13 August 1382		John I
	Beatrice of Portugal	Ferdinand I of Portugal (Burgundy)	9 December 1372	17 May 1383		9 October 1390 husband's death	8 March 1408	John I
	Catherine of Lancaster	John of Gaunt, 1st Duke of Lancaster (Lancaster)	31 March 1373	17 September 1388	9 October 1390 husband's ascession	25 December 1406 husband's death	2 June 1418	Henry III
	Maria of Aragon	Ferdinand I of Aragon (Trastamara)	1396	1418 or 4 August 1420		18 February 1445		John II
	Isabella of Portugal	Infante John, Lord of Reguengos de Monsaraz (Aviz)	1428	22 July 1447		20 July 1454 husband's death	15 August 1496	John II
	Joan of Portugal	Edward of Portugal (Aviz)	20 March 1439	21 May 1455		1468 marriage annulled	12 December 1475	Henry IV
	Ferdinand of Aragon	John II of Aragon (Trastamara)	10 March 1452	19 October 1469	11 December 1474	15 January 1475 became King jure uxoris	23 January 1516	Isabella I
	Philip IV of Burgundy	Maximilian I, Holy Roman Emperor (Habsburg)	22 July 1478	20 October 1496	26 November 1504	12 July 1506 became King jure uxoris	25 September 1506	Joanna I

=== House of Habsburg ===
Picture	Name	Father	Birth	Marriage	Became Consort	Ceased to be Consort	Death	Spouse
	Isabella of Portugal	Manuel I of Portugal (Aviz)	24 October, 1503	11 March, 1526		1 May, 1539		Charles V

At 1556, the union of the Spanish kingdoms is generally called Spain and Mary I of England (second wife of Philip II) is listed as the first Queen consort of Spain.

== See also ==
- List of Castilian monarchs
- List of Aragonese consorts
- List of Asturian consorts
- List of Galician consorts
- List of Hispanic consorts
- List of Leonese consorts
- List of Navarrese consorts
- List of Spanish consorts
