= Urraca Garcés =

Urraca Garcés may refer to:

- Urraca Garcés (countess), born c. 944, daughter of King García Sánchez I of Pamplona, wife of Count Fernán González of Castile
- Urraca of Covarrubias, born c. 963, daughter of Count García Fernández of Castile and abbess of Covarrubias
- Urraca Garcés (queen), born c. 1000, daughter of King García Sánchez II of Pamplona, wife of King Alfonso V of León
- Urraca Garcés, born c. 1052, daughter of King García Sánchez III of Pamplona, wife of Count García Ordóñez
