= Infanta Elvira =

Infanta Elvira may refer to:

- Elvira Ramírez (c. 935–aft. 986), daughter of King Ramiro II of León
- Elvira of Toro (1038/39–1101), daughter of King Ferdinand I of León
- Elvira of Castile, Queen of Sicily (c. 1100–1135), daughter of King Alfonso VI of León and Castile

== See also ==
- Elvira of Castile (disambiguation)
- Elvira of León (disambiguation)
- Queen Elvira (disambiguation)
