= Queen Constance =

Queen Constance may refer to:

- Constance of Arles (c. 986–1032), wife of King Robert II of France
- Constance of Burgundy (1046–1093), wife of King Alfonso VI of León and Castile
- Constance of Castile (1136/40–1160), wife of King Louis VII of France
- Constance I of Sicily (1154–1198), Queen regnant of Sicily
- Constance of Aragon, Holy Roman Empress (1179–1222), wife of King Emeric of Hungary, later wife of Emperor Frederick II, Holy Roman Emperor, King of the Romans, Germany, Burgundy, Italy and Sicily
- Constance of Hungary (c. 1180–1240), wife of King Ottokar I of Bohemia
- Constance of Toulouse (c. 1180–after 1260), wife of King Sancho VII of Navarre
- Constance of Hungary, Queen of Galicia (c. 1237–1302), wife of Leo I, King of Galicia and Grand Prince of Kiev
- Constance II of Sicily (c. 1249–1302), Queen regnant of Sicily and wife of King Peter I of Aragon, Valencia and Sicily
- Constance of Portugal (1290–1313), wife of King Ferdinand IV of Castile and León
- Constance, Queen of Cyprus and Armenia (1304/06–after 1344), wife of King Henry II of Cyprus, later wife of King Leo IV of Armenia
- Constance of Aragon, Queen of Majorca (1318–1346), wife of King James III of Majorca
- Constanza Manuel (c. 1318–1349), wife of King Alfonso XI of Castile and León
- Constance of Austria (1588–1631), wife of King Sigismund III Vasa of Poland

== See also ==
- Empress Constance (disambiguation)
