= Church of San Pedro de Tejada, Burgos =

Spanish church and former monastery

Coordinates: 42°50′33″N 3°34′20″W

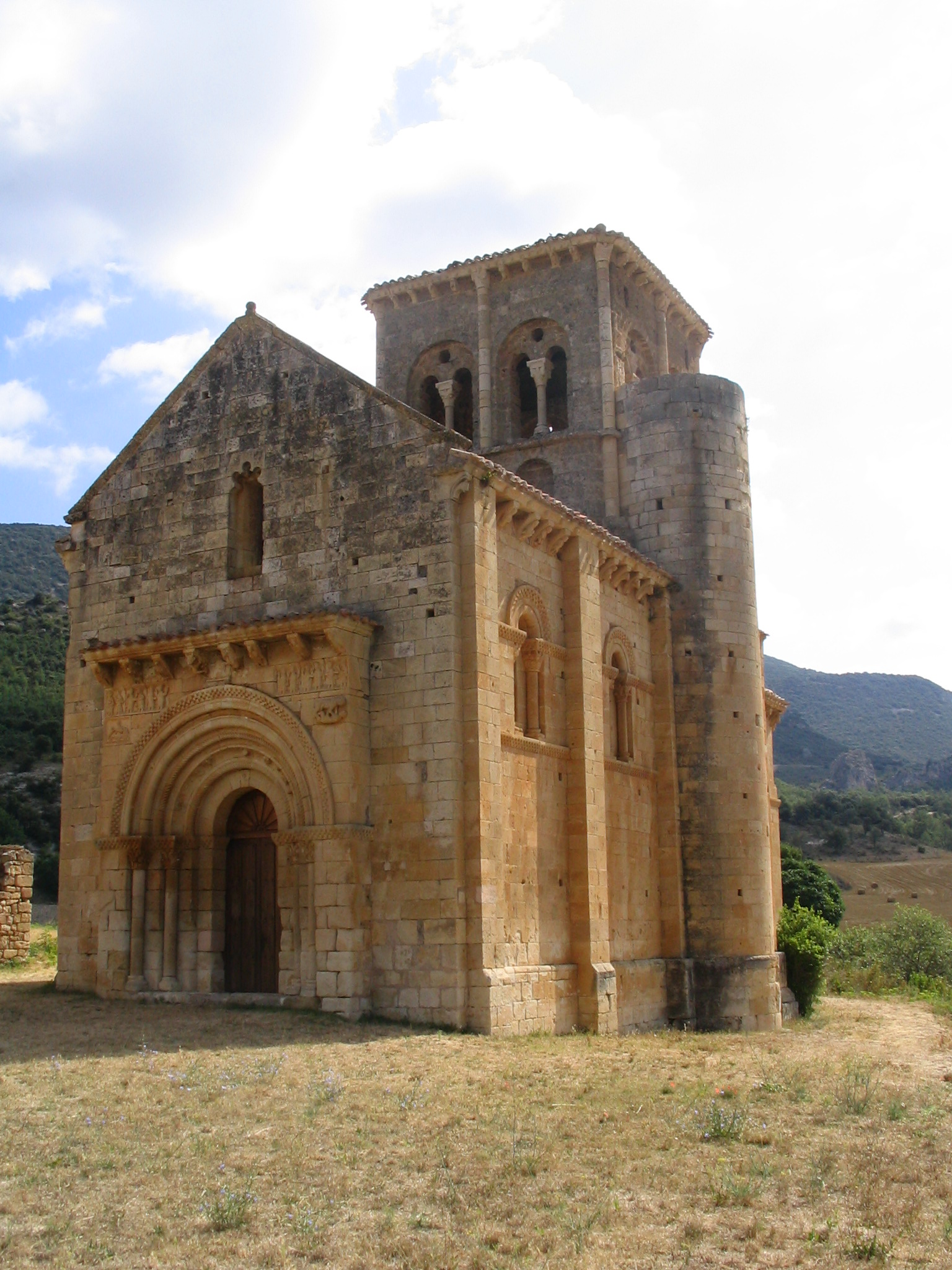
The church of San Pedro de Tejada

The Church of San Pedro de Tejada is an important example of Spanish Romanesque architecture. Located in the Valley of Valdivieso, part of the region of Las Merindades in the Province of Burgos, it served a monastery which may have already existed at the beginning of the 9th century. The present church was built in the 12th century. It is the only surviving element of the old monastic compound, and is described in Spanish as an eremita or hermitage.

== Building ==
The building plan follows the standard Romanesque style, with a single rounded apse on the eastern side. The layout is basilical, and a large square tower covers the crossing. The tower can be accessed by a staircase that ascends through a circular shaft attached to the southern wall.

The exterior of the apse is divided into three panels, each of them decorated by a window with typical Romanesque ornaments in the arches and framed by columns with carved capitals on each side.

The cornice is decorated throughout with a set of 86 corbels carved with a variety of characters, including monks, bishops, acrobats, musicians, animals and scenes representing punishment for vices.

The main entrance to the church is located on the west. It is richly decorated with reliefs depicting scenes from the New Testament, such as the Last Supper and the Apostles. Another entrance on the northern side may have been used to communicate with the monastic buildings.

The large tower was built in two storeys—the lower one decorated with arcades, and the upper one with open arches.

== Interior ==
The church's interior is also richly decorated with sculpture that alternates vegetal motifs with episodes of the Old and New Testament. The apse is decorated with an arcade. The columns of the crossing are fitted with sculpted capitals that depict the Last Supper, the Liberation of San Peter and the Pantocrator surrounded by the Tetramorph.

An altarpiece formerly in the church has been moved to the Museo de Burgos. It was painted by a monk from the Monastery of San Salvador de Oña In November 2024 Spanish Police recovered a stolen piece of a relief known as the Adoration of the Kings, which had been taken from north wall of the presbytery of the Hermitage of San Pedro de Tejada in 1935.

== Gallery ==
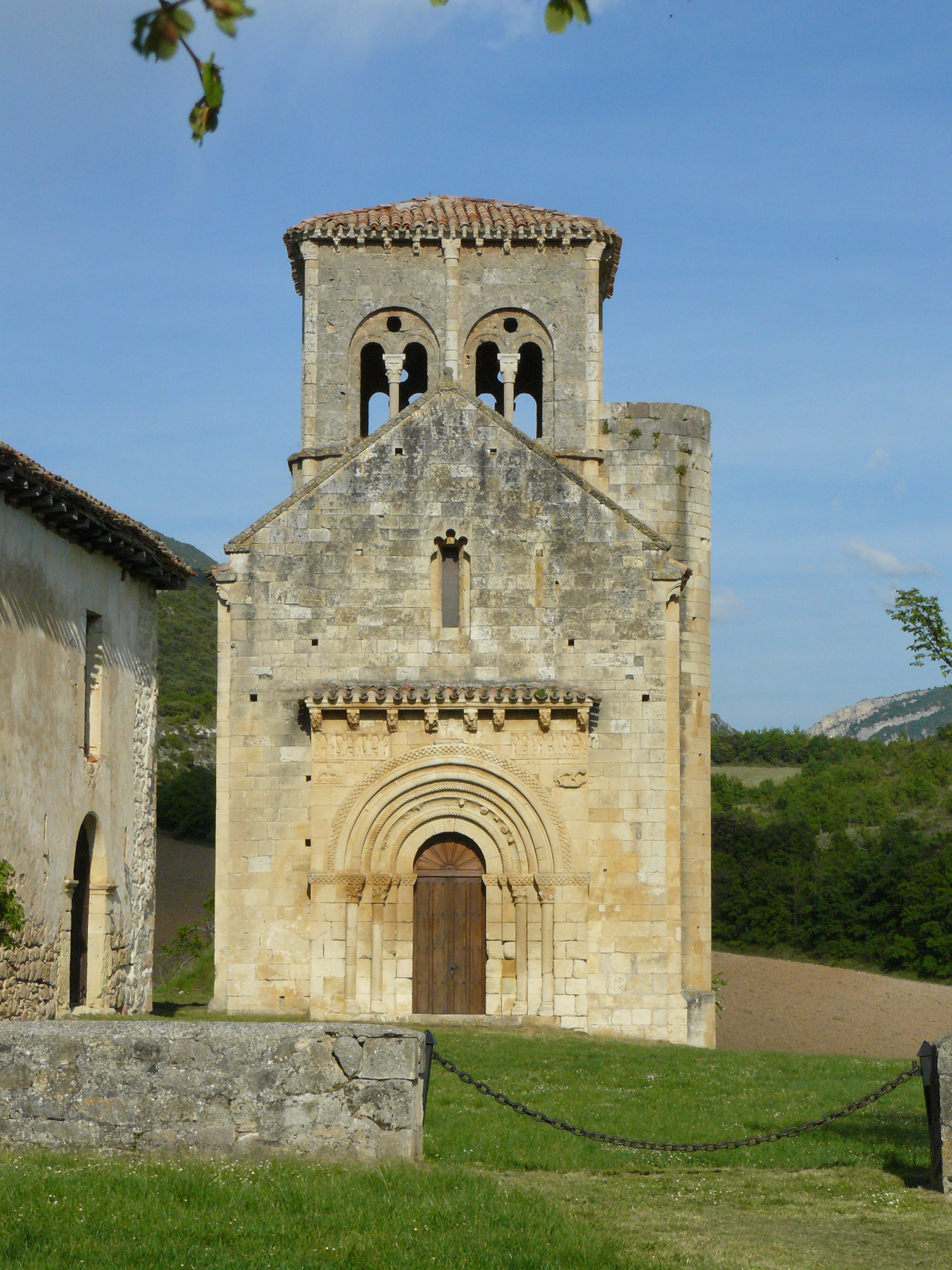
The church

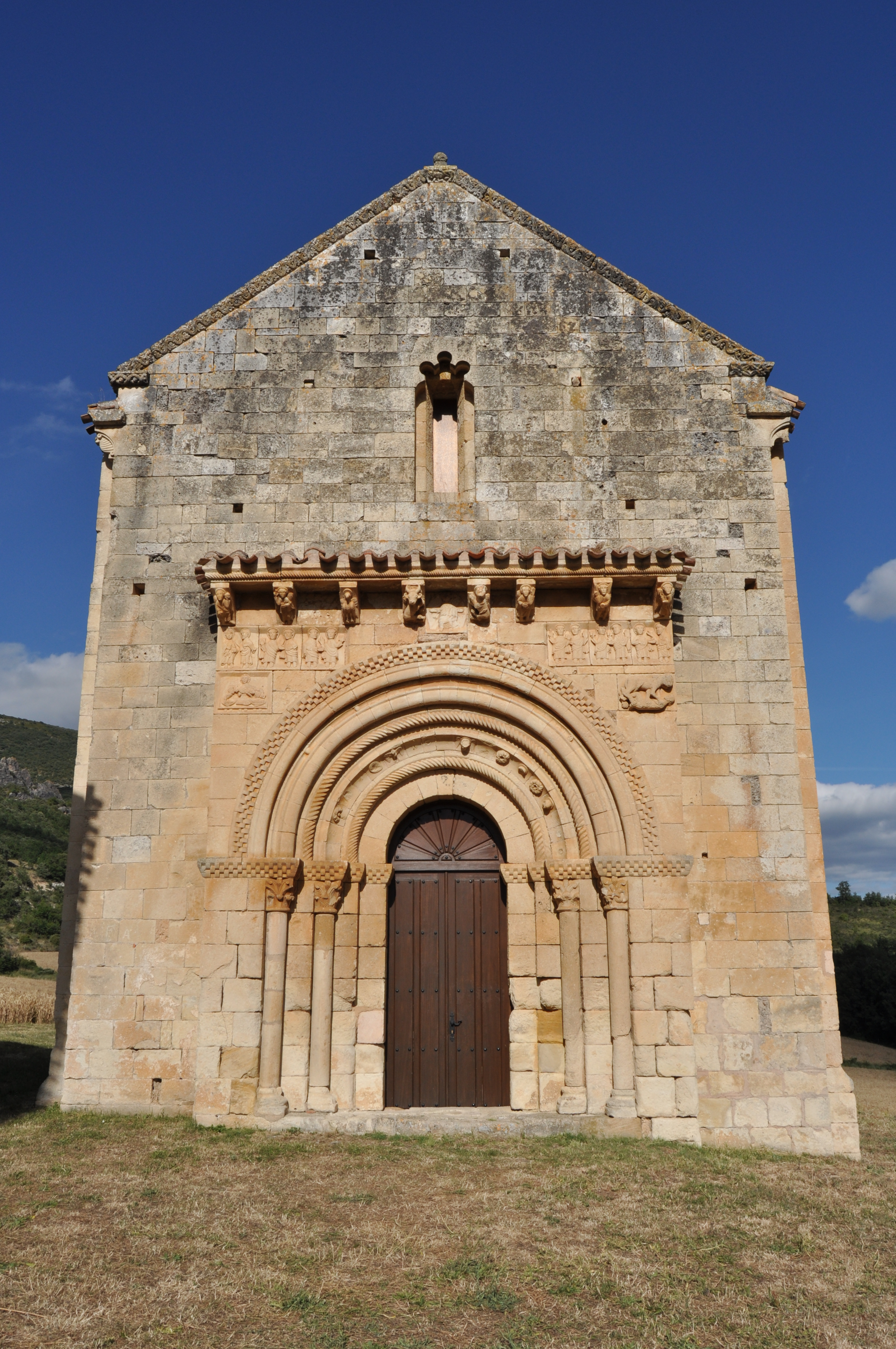
Main façade

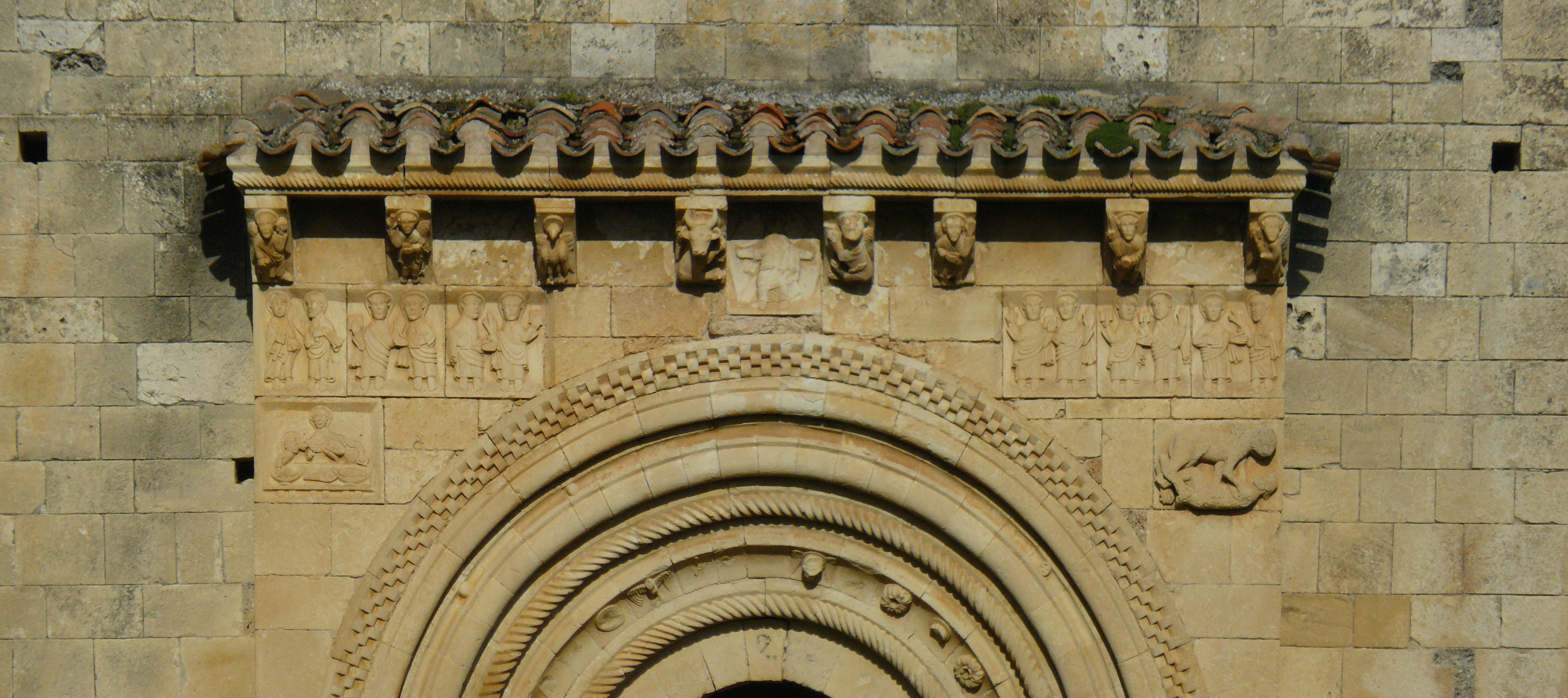
Close-up of the main façade

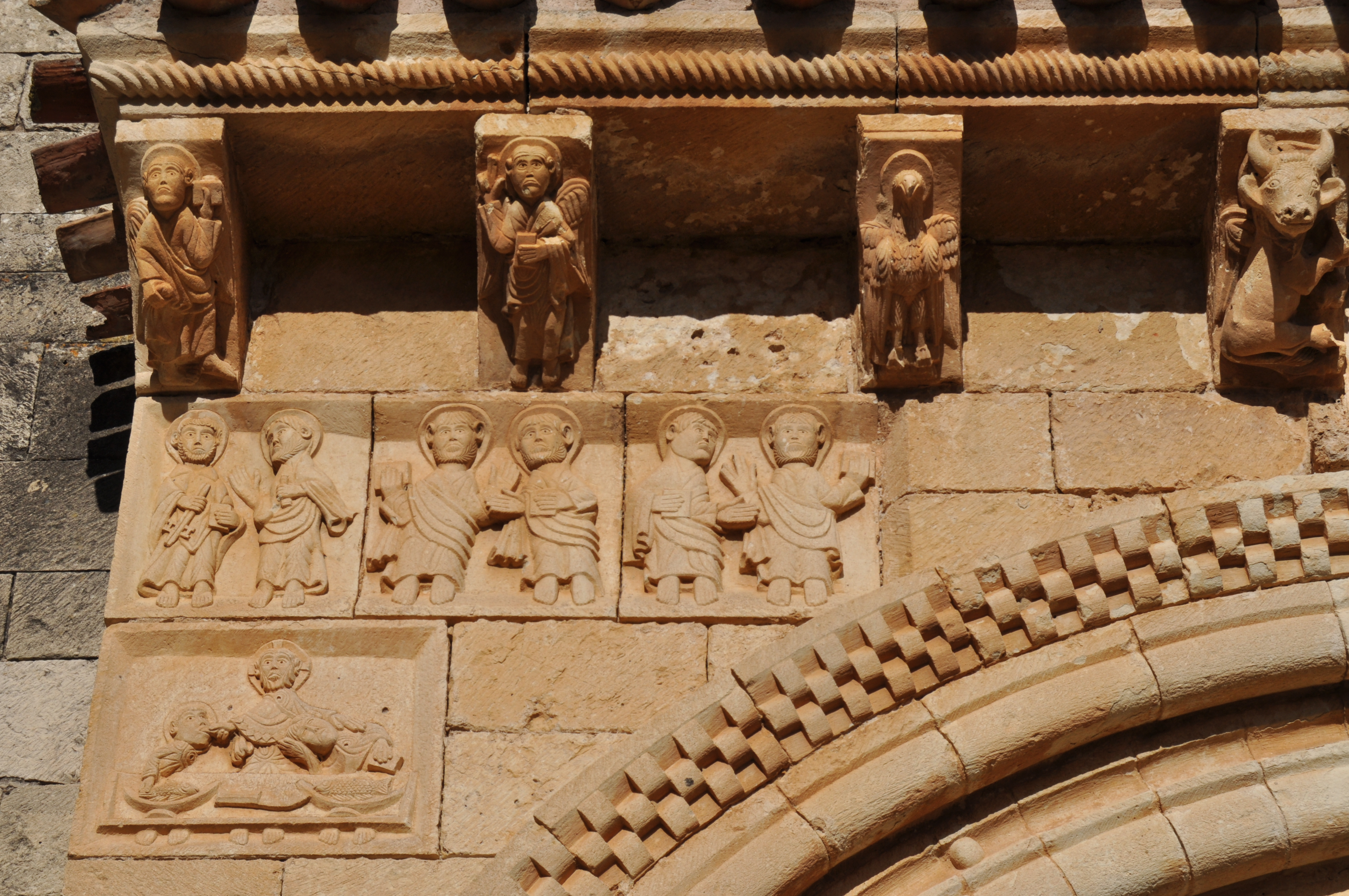
Detail of the façade, the Last Supper

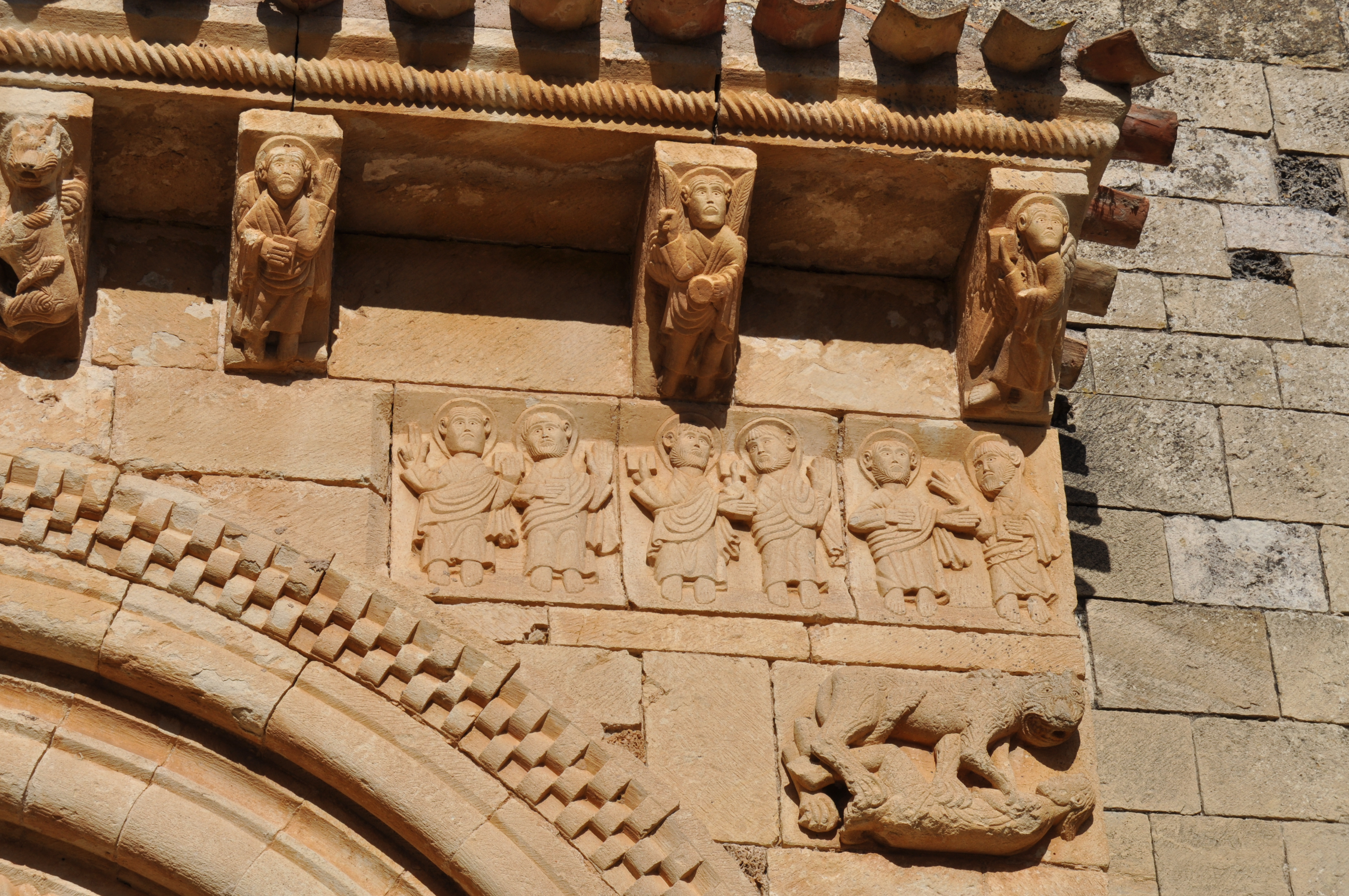
Detail of the façade, the Apostles

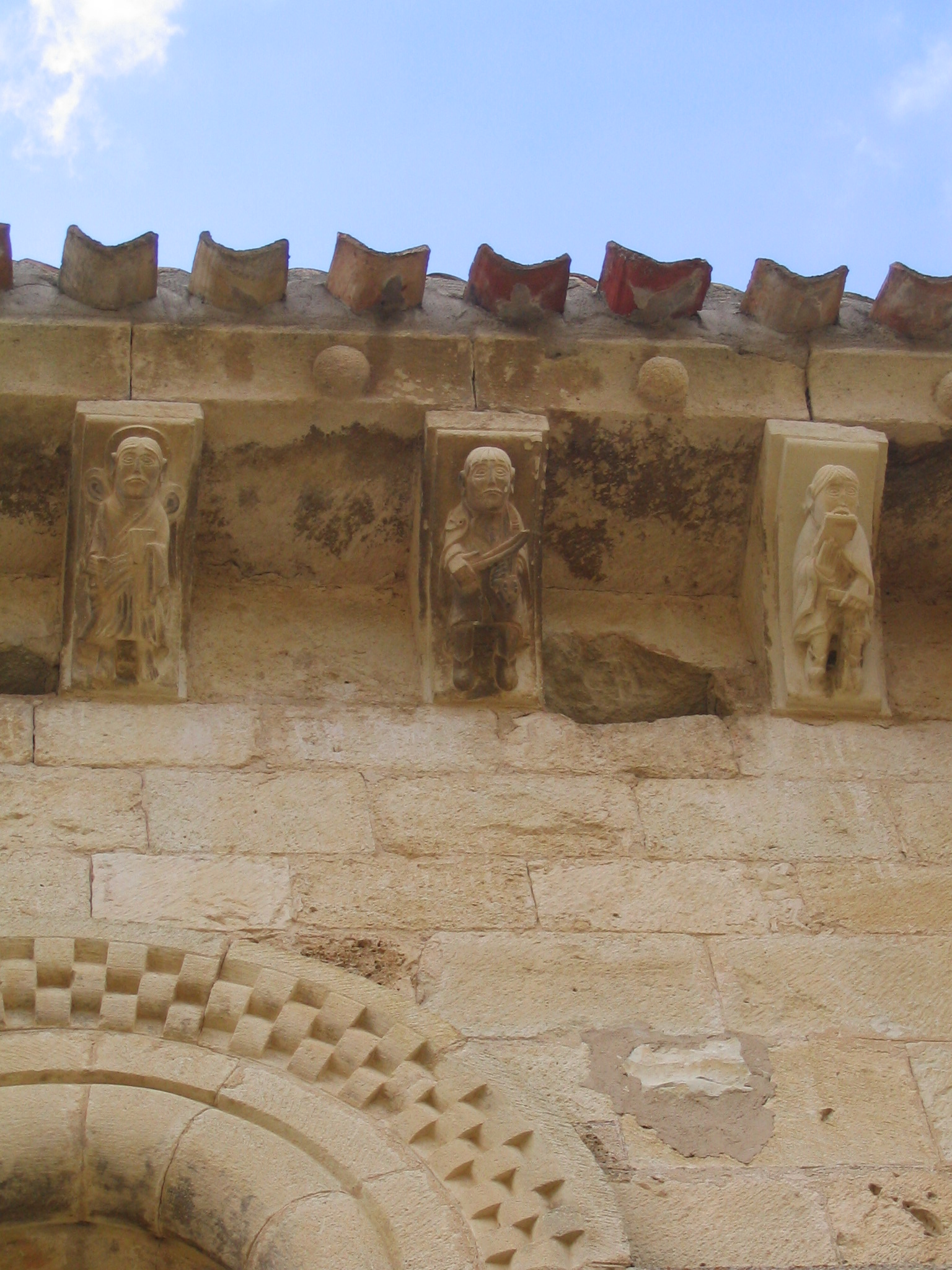
Corbels

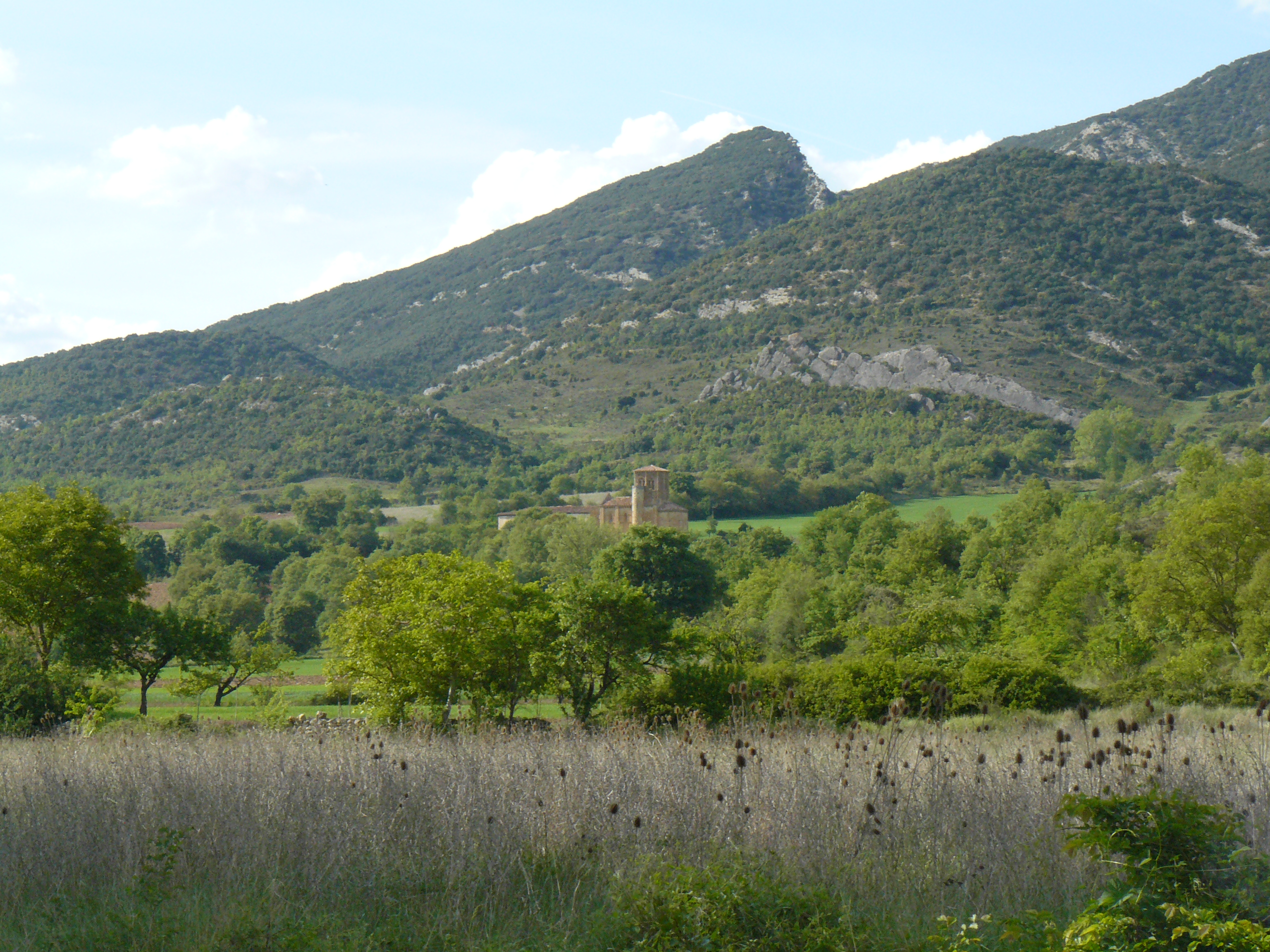
General view
