= García II =

García II may refer to:

- García Íñiguez of Pamplona (died 882), king of Pamplona
- García Jiménez of Pamplona, (sub- or co-)king of a part of Pamplona in the late 9th century
- García II Sánchez of Gascony called the Bent, was the duke of Gascony from sometime before 887 to his death
- García Sánchez II of Pamplona (died 1000–1004), called the Trembling, the Tremulous, or the Trembler, king of Pamplona from 994 until his death
- García Sánchez of Castile (died 1029) was the last independent count of Castile
- García II of Galicia and Portugal (c. 1042 – 1090), King of Galicia and Portugal
- Garcia II of Kongo ruled the Kingdom of Kongo from 23 January 1641 to 1661
