= Agnes of Aquitaine, Queen of León and Castile =

Queen of León (1069–1077) and Castile (1072–1077)

Agnes of Aquitaine

Queen consort of León
- Tenure: 1069–1072; 1072–1077

Queen consort of Castile
- Tenure: 1072–1077
- Spouse: Alfonso VI of León and Castile
- House: House of Poitiers
- Father: William VIII, Duke of Aquitaine
- Mother: Mathilde

Agnes of Aquitaine (Spanish: Inés) was a member of the House of Poitou and an Iberian queen in the 11th-century. She was initially solely queen of León, then also of Castile by her marriage to Alfonso VI. Additionally, she appears to be the first Iberian queen-consort foreign to the peninsula, being of Frankish origin, the women preceding her were largely Christian Iberians or Muslim princesses of the Banu Qasi.

== Family ==
Contemporary records show Agnes to have been daughter of William VIII, Duke of Aquitaine and his second wife Matilda, whose origins are uncertain. She has been confused with a half-sister of the same name who was also an Iberian queen, Agnes, wife of Peter I of Aragon and Navarre.

== Queen ==
In 1069, Agnes married Alfonso VI, king of León. His father divided the kingdom into three realms upon his death. Alfonso and his brother Sancho would first join forces to supplant their brother García in Kingdom of Galicia, before turning on each other. In January 1072, Alfonso (and presumably Agnes) was forced to flee and Sancho took the entire realm of their father. Sancho was assassinated later that year and Alfonso returned, being crowned king of the reunited kingdom of their father in October 1072. At that time he also claimed to be "Emperor of all Spain".

They last appear together in May 1077, and then Alfonso appears alone. This suggests that Agnes had died, although Orderic Vitalis reports that in 1109 Alfonso's 'relict' Agnes remarried to Elias I of Maine. Though this has led to the speculation that Alfonso and Agnes had divorced due to consanguinity, it seems more likely that the episode related to Alfonso's final wife and widow, Beatrice, who is known to have returned to France after Alfonso's death, and that Orderic confused the two. Agnes and Alfonso had no children, nor did Elias by his wife.

== Death and burial ==
Several alternative accounts are given for the death of Agnes. Some sources place it in 1078, corresponding to her disappearance from the records. A surviving obituary notice has been interpreted as placing her death in 1097. This record, though, simply refers to Queen Agnes, and probably was reference to her half-sister Agnes, Queen of Navarre, who died in that year. Were the report of her marriage Elias accurate, it would require her survival at least to that date.

A burial monument to Agnes is among those in the royal monastery of Sahagún, near that of Alfonso's second wife, Constance of Burgundy. However, the surviving monuments at Sahagún are not contemporary and errors have been found in the reported inscriptions, so this may not be authentic.

Preceded by Sancha of León	Queen consort of León; 1069–1072	Succeeded by Alberta
Preceded by Alberta	Queen consort of León and Castile; 1072–1077	Succeeded by Constance of Burgundy
