= Ñíguez =

Ñíguez (Spanish pronunciation: [ˈɲiɣeθ]) is a Spanish surname. Notable people with the surname include:

- Aarón Ñíguez (born 1989), Spanish footballer, brother of Jonathan and Saúl
- Jonathan Ñíguez (born 1985), Spanish footballer, brother of Aarón and Saúl
- José Antonio Ñíguez (born 1962), Spanish former footballer, father of Aarón, Jonathan and Saúl
- Saúl Ñíguez (born 1994), Spanish footballer, brother of Aarón and Jonathan

== See also ==
- Íñiguez
