= List of Spanish royal consorts =

Spouses of Spanish monarchs

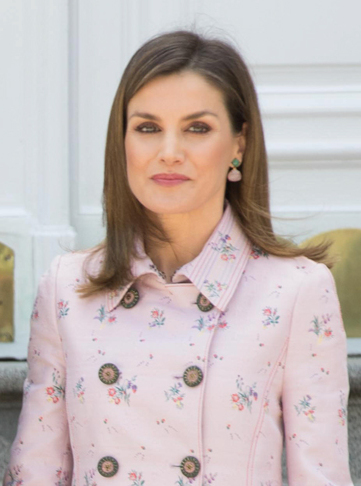
Queen Letizia, wife of King Felipe VI, is the current queen consort

This is a list of the women who were queens as wives of Spanish monarchs from the 16th century, when Spain was unified, until present. Francisco de Asís, Duke of Cádiz is the only King Consort, as the husband of Queen Isabella II.

== House of Habsburg ==
Picture	Arms	Name	Father	Birth	Marriage	Became Consort	Ceased to be Consort	Death	Spouse
		Isabella of Portugal	Manuel I of Portugal (Aviz)	24 October 1503	10 March 1526		1 May 1539		Charles I
		Mary I of England	Henry VIII of England (Tudor)	18 February 1516	25 July 1554	16 January 1556 husband's ascension	17 November 1558		Philip II
		Elisabeth of Valois	Henry II of France (Valois)	2 April 1546	22 June 1559		3 October 1568		Philip II
		Anna of Austria	Maximilian II, Holy Roman Emperor (Habsburg)	1 November 1549	4 May 1570		26 October 1580		Philip II
		Margaret of Austria	Charles II, Archduke of Austria (Habsburg)	25 December 1584	18 April 1599		3 October 1611		Philip III
		Elisabeth of France	Henry IV of France (Bourbon)	22 November 1602	25 November 1615	31 March 1621 husband's accession	6 October 1644		Philip IV
		Maria Anna of Austria	Ferdinand III, Holy Roman Emperor (Habsburg)	24 December 1634	7 October 1649		17 September 1665 husband's death	16 May 1696	Philip IV
		Marie Louise d'Orléans	Philippe I, Duke of Orléans (Orléans)	26 March 1662	19 November 1679		12 February 1689		Charles II
		Maria Anna of Neuburg	Philip William, Elector Palatine (Wittelsbach)	28 October 1667	14 May 1690		1 November 1700 husband's death	16 July 1740	Charles II

== House of Bourbon ==
Picture	Arms	Name	Father	Birth	Marriage	Became Consort	Ceased to be Consort	Death	Spouse
		Maria Luisa Gabriella of Savoy	Victor Amadeus II of Sardinia (Savoy)	17 September 1688	2 November 1701		14 February 1714		Philip V
		Elisabeth Farnese	Odoardo Farnese, Hereditary Prince of Parma (Farnese)	22 October 1692	24 December 1714		14 January 1724 husband's abdication	11 July 1766	Philip V
		Louise Élisabeth d'Orléans	Philippe II, Duke of Orléans (Orléans)	11 December 1709	20 January 1722	14 January 1724 husband's accession	31 August 1724 husband's death	16 June 1742	Louis I
		Elisabeth Farnese	Odoardo Farnese, Hereditary Prince of Parma (Farnese)	22 October 1692	24 December 1714	6 September 1724 husband's reaccession	9 July 1746 husband's death	11 July 1766	Philip V
		Maria Madalena Barbara Xavier Leonor Teresa Antonia Josefa of Portugal	John V of Portugal (Braganza)	4 December 1711	20 January 1729	9 July 1746 husband's accession	27 August 1758		Ferdinand VI
		Maria Amalia Christina Franziska Xaveria Flora Walburga of Saxony	Augustus III of Poland (Wettin)	24 November 1724	31 October 1737	10 August 1759 husband's accession	27 September 1760		Charles III
		Luisa Maria Teresa Anna (Maria Luisa) of Parma	Philip, Duke of Parma (Bourbon-Parma)	9 December 1751	4 September 1765	14 December 1788 husband's accession	19 March 1808 husband's abdication	2 January 1819	Charles IV

== House of Bonaparte ==
Picture	Arms	Name	Father	Birth	Marriage	Became Consort	Ceased to be Consort	Death	Spouse
		Marie Julie Clary	François Clary	26 December 1771	1 August 1794	1 August 1808 husband's accession	11 December 1813 husband's abdication	7 April 1845	Joseph

== House of Bourbon (first restoration) ==
Picture	Arms	Name	Father	Birth	Marriage	Became Consort	Ceased to be Consort	Death	Spouse
		Maria Isabel Francisca de Assis Antónia Carlota Joana Josefa Xavier de Paula Micaela Rafaela Isabel Gonzaga	John VI of Portugal (Braganza)	19 May 1797	29 September 1816		26 December 1818		Ferdinand VII
		Maria Josepha Amalia Beatrix Xaveria Vincentia Aloysia Franziska de Paula Franziska de Chantal Anna Apollonia Johanna Nepomucena Walburga Theresia Ambrosia of Saxony	Maximilian, Crown Prince of Saxony (Wettin)	7 December 1803	20 October 1819		18 May 1829		Ferdinand VII
		Maria Christina Ferdinanda of the Two Sicilies	Francis I of the Two Sicilies (Bourbon-Two Sicilies)	27 April 1806	11 December 1829		29 September 1833 husband's death	22 August 1878	Ferdinand VII
		Francisco de Asís María Fernando, Duke of Cádiz	Infante Francisco de Paula of Spain (Bourbon)	13 May 1822	10 October 1846		30 September 1868 wife's deposition	17 April 1902	Isabella II

== House of Savoy ==
Picture	Arms	Name	Father	Birth	Marriage	Became Consort	Ceased to be Consort	Death	Spouse
		Maria Vittoria Carlotta Enrichetta Giovanna dal Pozzo	Carlo Emanuele dal Pozzo, Prince della Cisterna	9 August 1847	30 May 1863	16 November 1870 husband's accession	11 February 1873 husband's abdication	8 November 1876	Amadeo I

== House of Bourbon (second and third restoration) ==
Picture	Arms	Name	Father	Birth	Marriage	Became Consort	Ceased to be Consort	Death	Spouse
		María de las Mercedes Isabel Francisca de Asís Antonia Luisa Fernanda of Orléans	Prince Antoine, Duke of Montpensier (Orléans-Galliera)	24 June 1860	23 January 1878		26 June 1878		Alfonso XII
		Maria Christina Henriette Desideria Felicitas Raineria of Austria	Archduke Karl Ferdinand of Austria (Habsburg-Lorraine)	21 July 1858	29 November 1879		25 November 1885 husband's death	6 February 1929	Alfonso XII
		Victoria Eugenie Julia Ena of Battenberg	Prince Henry of Battenberg (Battenberg)	24 October 1887	31 May 1906		14 April 1931 husband's deposition	15 April 1969	Alfonso XIII
		Sophia Margarita Victoria Federica of Greece and Denmark	Paul of Greece (Schleswig-Holstein-Sonderburg-Glücksburg)	2 November 1938	14 May 1962	22 November 1975 husband's accession	18 June 2014 husband's abdication	Living	Juan Carlos I
		Letizia Ortiz Rocasolano	Jesús José Ortiz Álvarez	15 September 1972	22 May 2004	19 June 2014 husband's accession	Incumbent	Living	Felipe VI

== See also ==
- List of Spanish monarchs
- List of Aragonese consorts
- List of Asturian consorts
- List of Castilian consorts
- List of Leonese consorts
- List of Galician consorts
- List of Navarrese consorts
