= Ava of Ribagorza, Countess of Castile =

Countess consort of Castile

Ava
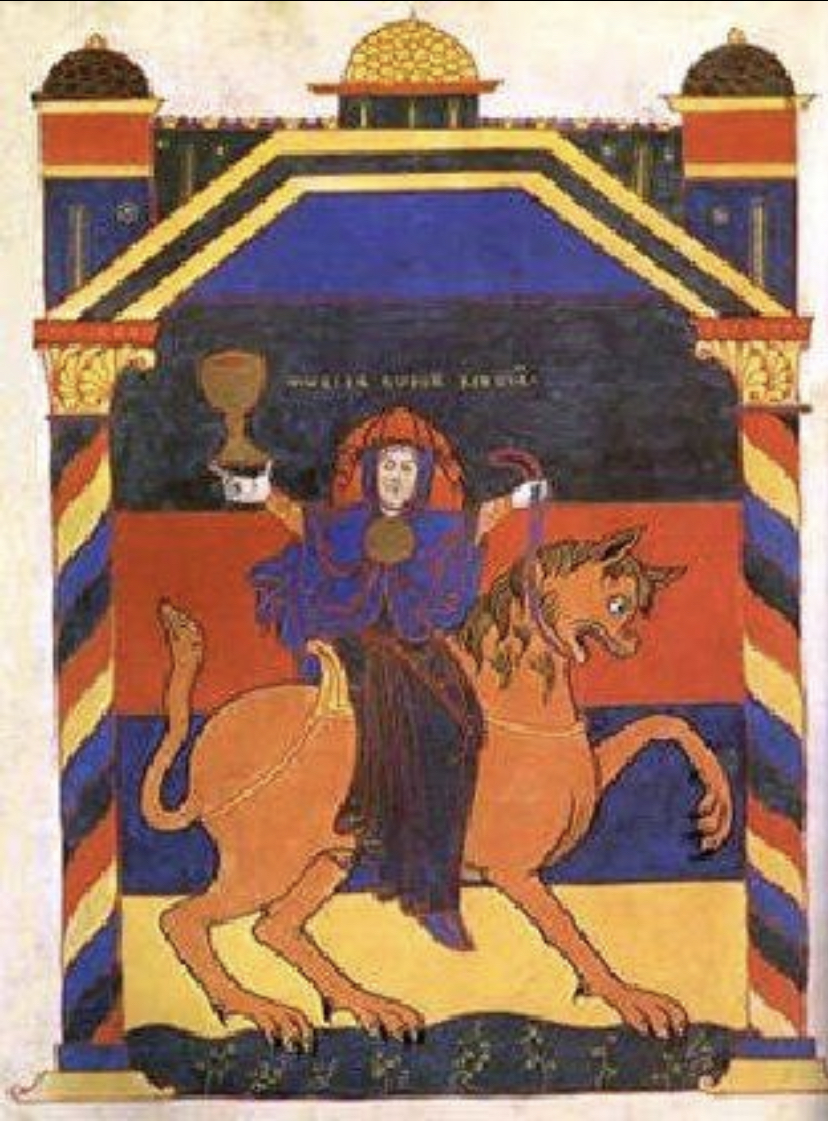
- Ava
- Title: Countess consort of Castile
- Spouse: García Fernández of Castile
- Children: Sancho García of Castile; Urraca of Covarrubias; Elvira of Castile, Queen of León

Ava of Ribagorza (Catalan: Ribagorça) (fl. 988) was countess consort of Castile by marriage to García Fernández of Castile.

== Life ==
She was born to Raymond II, Count of Ribagorza, and Garsenda of Fesenzac. She married García Fernández of Castile, with whom she had several children. Together with her husband, she made several donations to various convents.

Tradition accuses her of having encouraged her son Sancho in his rebellion against his father.

Ava has been the subject of multiple legends portraying her negatively, often linking her to conflicts and rebellions in Castile during her husband's reign. In one known legend, named la llegenda de la comtessa traïdora ('The Legend of the Traitorous Countess'), she betrayed García Fernández, who was captured in a raid by the Moors and killed, after having committed adultery with Al-Aziz Billah. According to the legend, after the death of her spouse, she attempted to poison his successor and her son by handing him a cup of poison, because she wished to marry Al-Aziz Billah; he, however, forced her to drink it herself, which resulted in her death.

These legends were likely fueled by hostility toward her as a foreigner in Castile. She was also identified as an advocate of a more diplomatic approach at court, in contrast to her husband's militaristic stance against the Moors, which may have contributed to her negative portrayal.

The date of her death is unconfirmed. The last confirmed record of her being alive dates to 988.

== Issue ==
- Mayor García, married Raymond III, count of Pallars Jussà
- Sancho García, count of Castile and Álava
- Urraca García entered the monastery of Infantado de Covarrubias
- Gonzalo García (died 979), speculated to have been ancestor of the House of Lara
- Elvira García, married in 991 to Bermudo II of León
- Toda García, married Sancho Gómez of Saldaña
- Oneca García, married in 995 Almanzor, chamberlain of Cordoba
