= Íñiguez =

Íñiguez is a surname. Notable people with the surname include:

- Dalia Íñiguez (1901–1995), Cuban actress
- Garcia Iñiguez, king of Pamplona
- Ismael Íñiguez (born 1981), Mexican football player
- Juan Sandoval Íñiguez (born 1933), Catholic cardinal
- Ladrón Íñiguez (died 1155), nobleman of the Kingdom of Navarre
- Lope Íñiguez (1050–1093), the second Lord of Biscay
- Martina Iñíguez, Argentinian writer

== See also ==
- Calixto García Íñiguez Stadium, multi-use stadium in Holguín, Cuba
- Ñíguez
