= Elvira of León =

Elvira of León may refer to:

- Elvira Menéndez (died 921), wife of Ordoño II of León
- Elvira Ramírez, daughter of Ramiro II of León
- Elvira Menéndez (died 1022), wife of Alfonso V of León
- Elvira of Toro, daughter of Ferdinand I of León and Castile
- Elvira of Castile, Queen of León, wife of Bermudo II of León

== See also ==
- Elvira of Castile (disambiguation)
- Infanta Elvira (disambiguation)
- Queen Elvira (disambiguation)
