= Empress Constance =

Empress Constance may refer to:

- Constance I of Sicily (1154–1198), Holy Roman empress
- Constance of Aragon, Holy Roman Empress (1179–1222)

== See also ==
- Queen Constance (disambiguation)
