= List of Galician royal consorts =

This is a list of the royal consorts of the Kingdom of Galicia. It is, in part, a continuation of the list of Asturian consorts.

== Royal consorts of Galicia ==
=== Suebic queens in Gallaecia ===
- NN (February 449–456), daughter of Theodoric I of the Ostrogoths, wife of Rechiar
- NN (464–469), mention as a Gothic princess possibly daughter of Theodoric II of the Ostrogoths, wife of Rechiar
- Sisegutia (570–583, 584–585), wife of Miro and 2nd wife of Andeca
- NN (584), daughter of Miro, 1st wife of Andeca

=== House of Alfonso ===
Name	Father	Birth	Marriage	Became Consort	Ceased to be Consort	Death	Spouse
Elvira Menéndez of Coimbra	Hermengildo Gutierrez, Count of Coimbra	864-75	890-900	20 December 910 husband's ascession	914 husband's ascession to León		Ordoño II
Goto Muñiz	Munio Gutiérrez, Lord of Amaía	-	before 927	July 925 husband's accession	after 10 June 929 husband's death	after 1 March 963	Sancho I Ordóñez

== See also ==
- List of Gothic queens
- List of Hispanic consorts
- List of Asturian royal consorts
- List of Castilian royal consorts
- List of Aragonese royal consorts
- List of Leonese royal consorts
- List of Spanish royal consorts
