= Monastery of San Salvador de Oña =

Monastery in Oña, Spain

Coordinates: 42.7336°N 3.4131°W

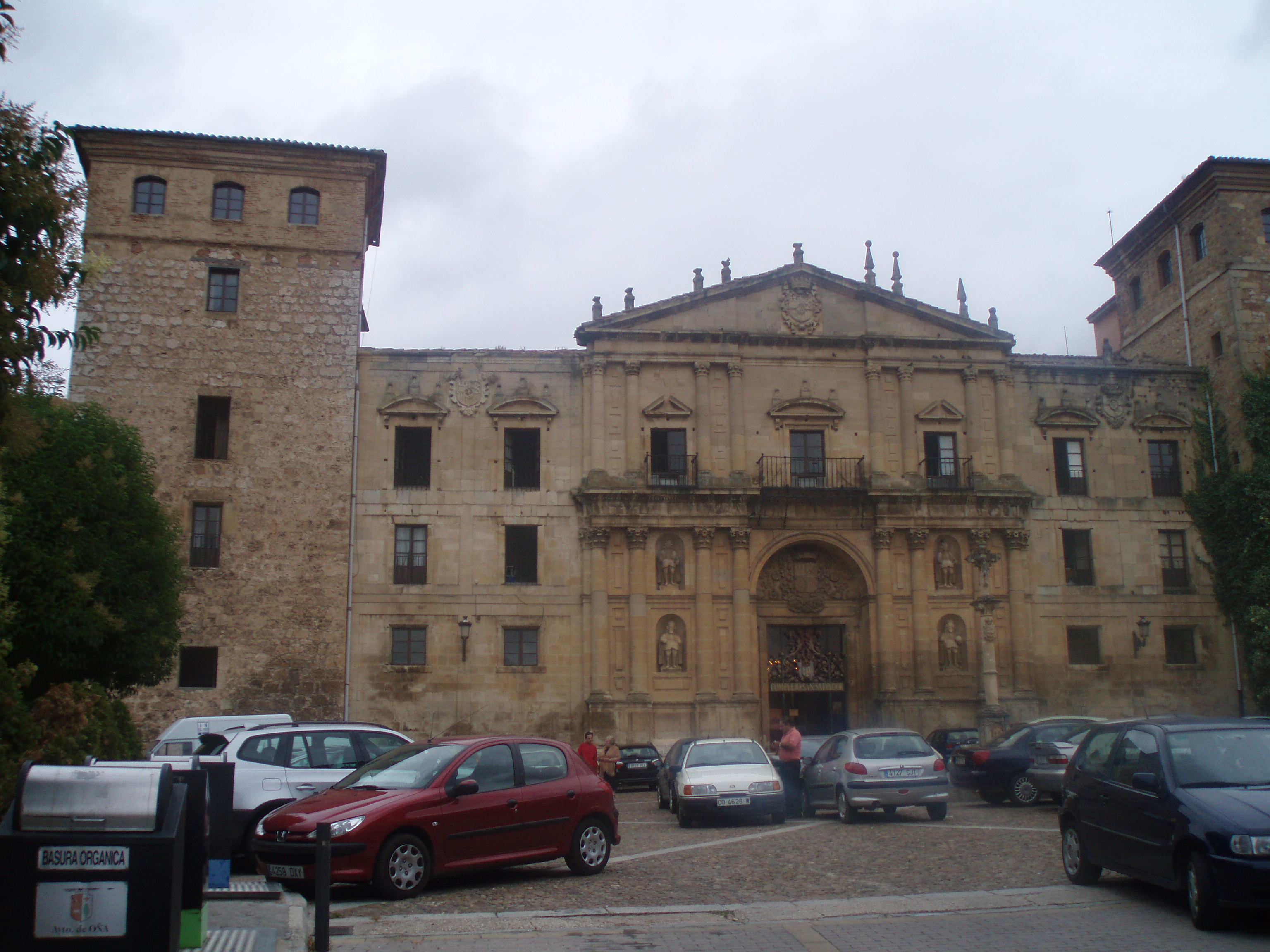
San Salvador de Oña.

The Monastery of San Salvador (Holy Savior) was a Benedictine monastery in the town of Oña, in the province of Burgos, central Spain, founded in 1011, which lasted until the 19th century.

== History ==
=== Benedictine monastery ===
The monastery was founded by Sancho García, the Count of Castile, for his daughter Tigridia, as a double monastery. The nuns came from the Monastery of San Juan in Cillaperlata, while the monks were from the Monastery of San Salvador in Loberuela.

In October 1033, King Sancho III of Pamplona gave the monastery to the Abbey of Cluny, by which it became a part of the largest monastic organization of the era. It flourished during this period, coming to have over 70 other monasteries and churches under its authority.

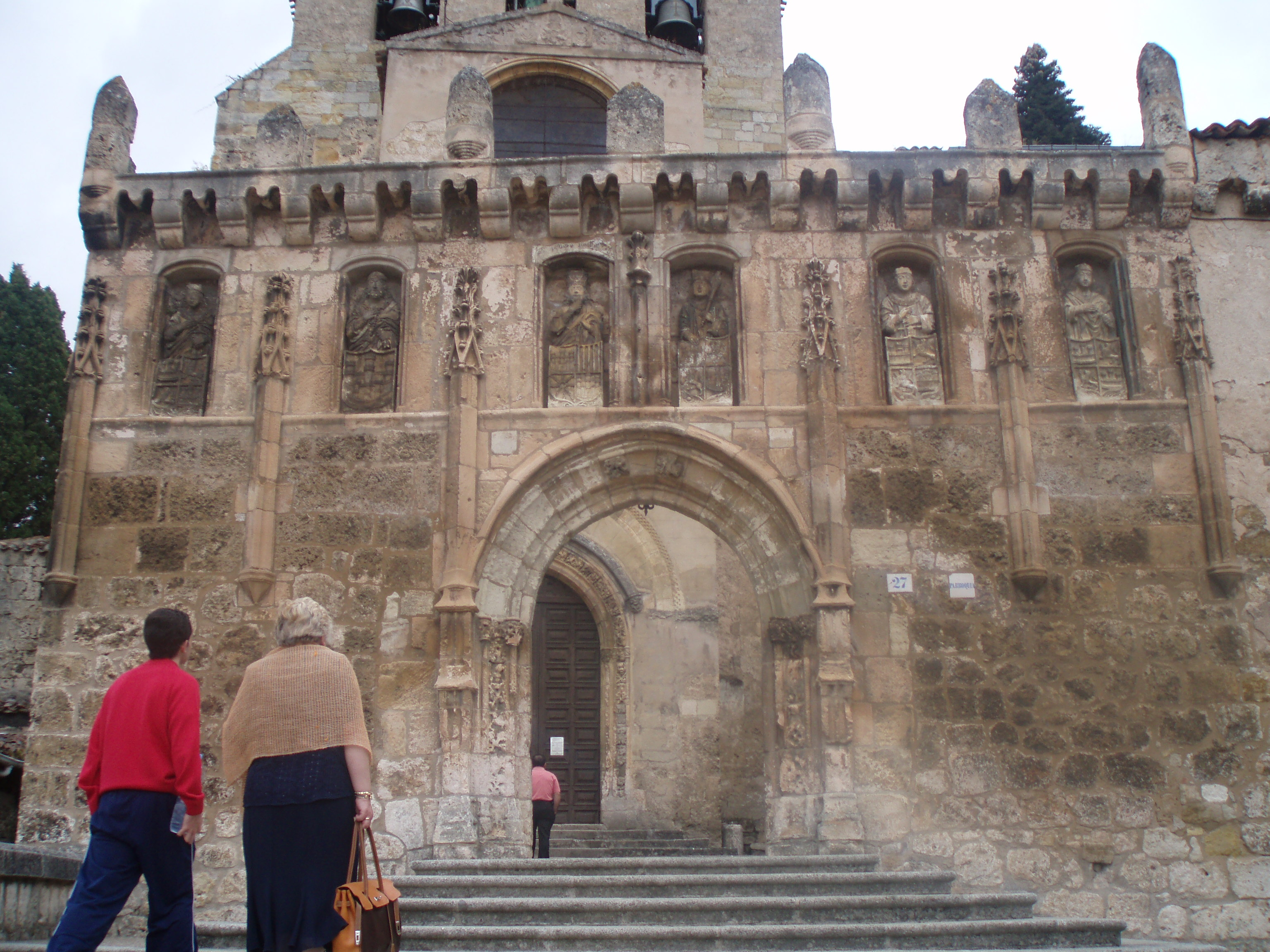
Portico to the former monastery, decorated with statues of the kings of Castile

In 1506 the monastery joined the Benedictine Congregation of Valladolid, which had a program of a return to the reformation of the monastic life, following a strict interpretation of the Rule of Saint Benedict. It was badly damaged during the Peninsular War of the Napoleonic era, and the monks were dispersed.

One notable member of the community was Dom Pedro Ponce de León, O.S.B., a monk of the community during the 16th century, who is believed to have been the first to develop a means of teaching the deaf, establishing a school for them at the monastery.

=== Modern era ===
In 1835, the monastic church was converted into a parish church to serve the people of the town. The property of the monastery was returned to the Catholic Church in 1880, when it was acquired by the Society of Jesus. They occupied the buildings for nearly 90 years.

The monastic complex came into the possession of the Province of Burgos in 1968, at which time it was used as a psychiatric hospital.

In 2012, the foundation Las Edades del Hombre (The Ages of Humankind) held its annual art exhibit in the church of the former monastery. The title of the exhibit was Monasticus (Monastic).

== Architecture ==
The surviving architecture of the monastic complex is a series of connected buildings, ranging in date from the Romanesque style of the 12th century, commonly seen in Cluniac monasteries, to the Gothic renovations of the 15th century.

The gate to the monastery is a notable example of the Mudéjar style.

The interior of the monastery church measures 83 meters (272.30 feet) by 20 meters (65.62 feet), with a height of 20 meters. It was renovated in the 15th century and contains a number of paintings attributed to a monk of the community, Dom Alonso of Zamora.

In the sanctuary can be seen a Renaissance-era altarpiece of the Immaculate Conception, along with remains from the medieval altarpiece it replaced in the 15th century. The choir has a domed vault built about 1460 by Fernando Díaz. An apse was opened in it during the 18th century to house the relics of St. Íñigo of Oña (died 1057), one of the first abbots of the monastery. The choir stalls there, also from that period, were carved in walnut by Dom Pedro of Valladolid.

== The crypt ==
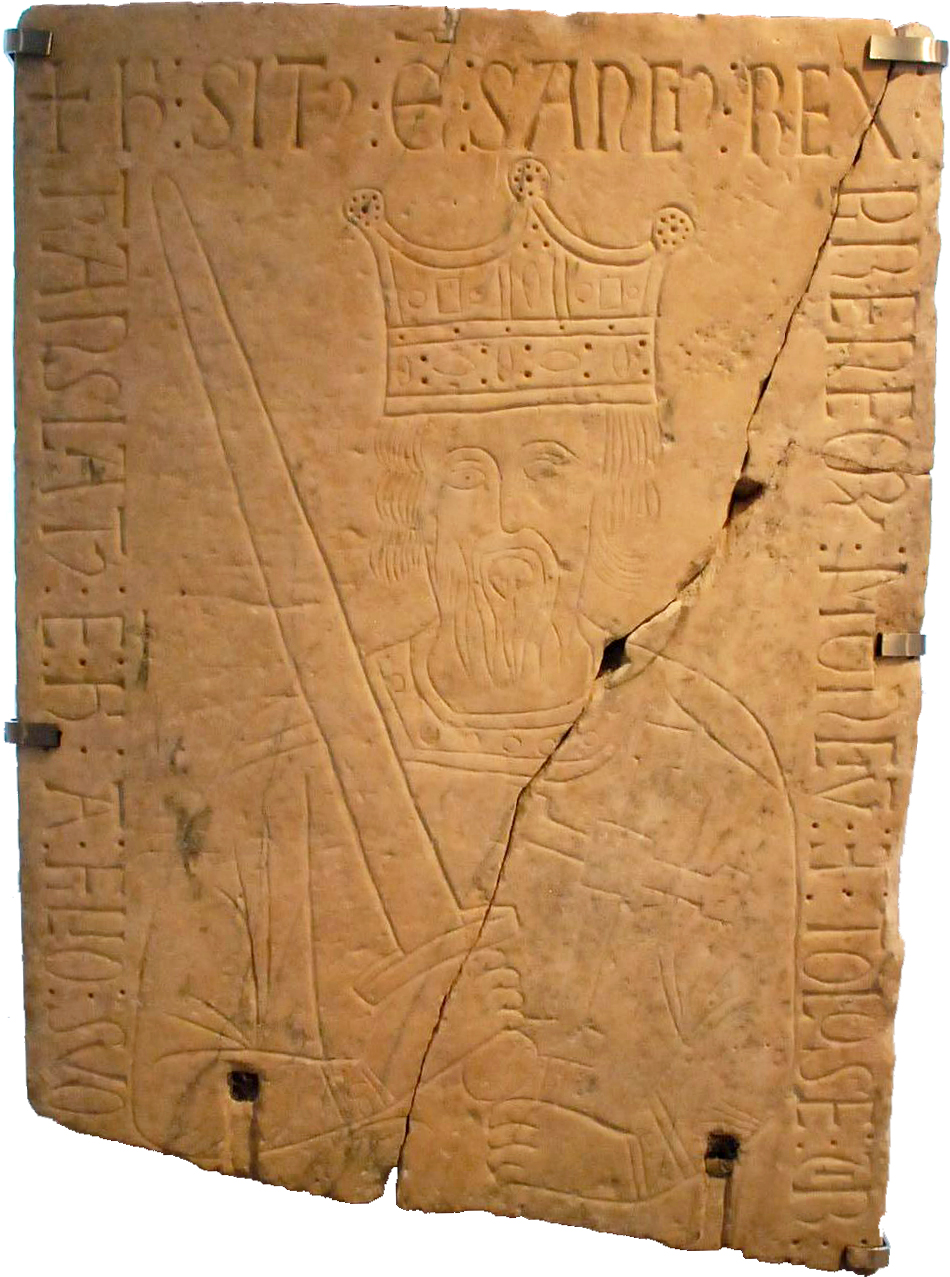
Tombstone of King Sancho III of Pamplona (now in the Museum of Léon)

The Monastery of San Salvador became the final resting place for many of the leading figures of northern Spain, especially during its early centuries of operation.

Among those buried there are:

- Count Sancho García of Castile (died 1017), the founder of the monastery
- Countess Urraca Gómez, his wife
- Count García Sánchez of Castile (1009-1028), their son, the last independent Count of Castile, assassinated in Zamora
- King Sancho III of Pamplona (992-1035)
- Queen Muniadona of Castile (died 1066), his queen and daughter of Count Sancho García of Castile and Countess Urraca
- King Sancho II of Castile and León (1036/8-1072)
- Infante García of Castile (1142-1146), son of King Alfonso VII of León
- Infante Philip (1292-1327), son of King Sancho IV of Castile, and of María de Molina (ca. 1265-1321)

== See also ==
- List of Jesuit sites

== Bibliography ==
- Arco y Garay, Ricardo del (1954). Sepulcros de la Casa Real de Castilla (in Spanish). Madrid: Instituto Jerónimo Zurita. Consejo Superior de Investigaciones Científicas. OCLC 11366237.
- Elorza, Juan C.; Vaquero, Lourdes; Castillo, Belén; Negro, Marta (1990). Junta de Castilla y León. Consejería de Cultura y Bienestar Social (ed.). El Panteón Real de las Huelgas de Burgos. Los enterramientos de los reyes de León y de Castilla. Publisher Evergráficas S.A. ISBN 84-241-9999-5.
- Martínez Diaz, Gonzalo (2004). El Condado de Castilla (711–1065): La Historia frente a la leyenda (in Spanish). Valladolid: Junta de Castilla y León. ISBN 84-9718-275-8.
- Gómez Barreda, Íñigo (2009) [1917]. Oña y su Real Monasterio (in Spanish). Valladolid: Editorial Maxtor. ISBN 84-9761-634-0. Archived from the original on 2010-09-28.
