= Urraca of Covarrubias =

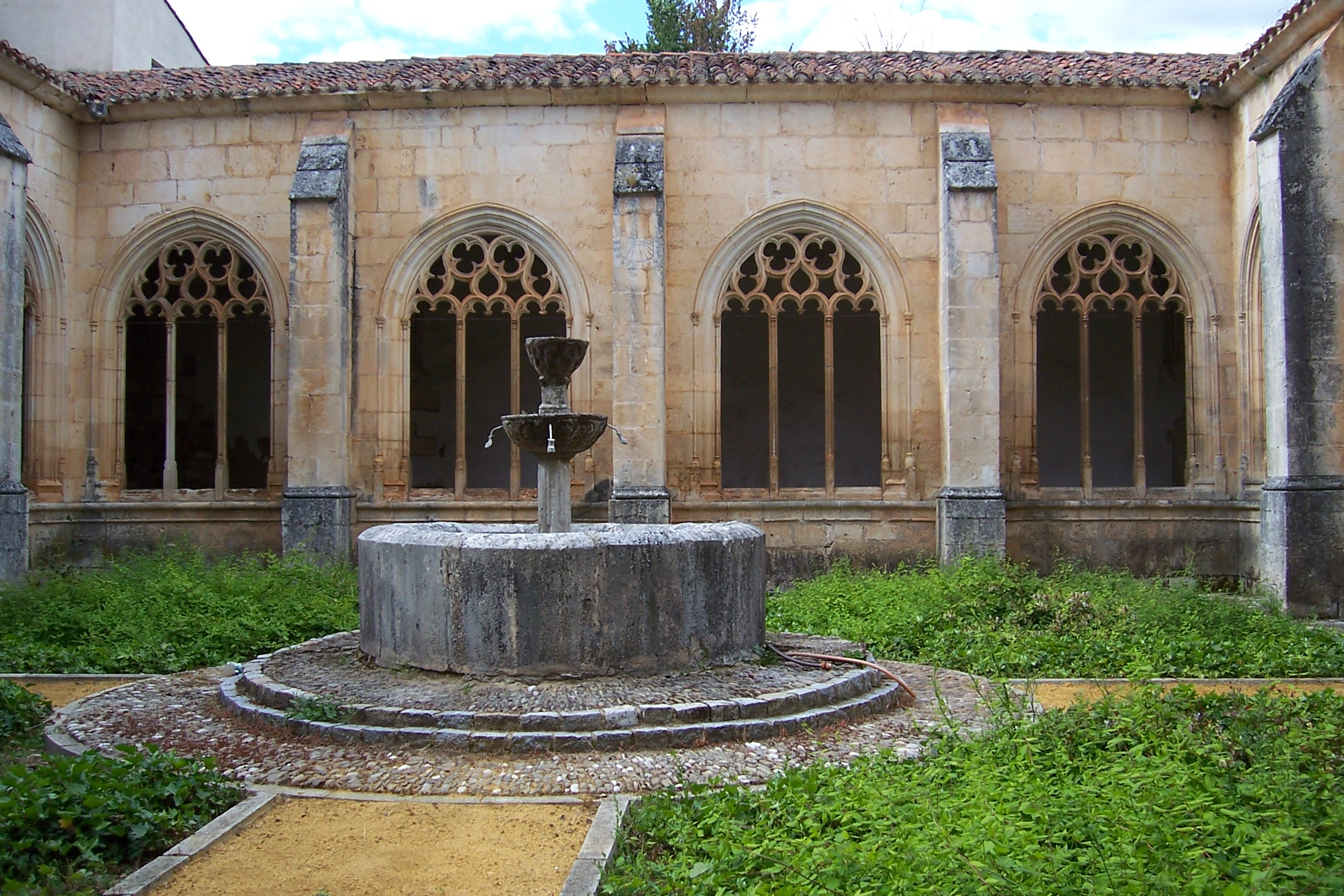
Cloister and fountain of the Abbey of San Cosme and San Damian in Covarrubias built in the 15th-century at the site of the ancient monastery.

Urraca García of Castile (died after January 1038) was co-regent of Castile during the minority of her nephew, García Sánchez of Castile, in 1017-28.

== Life ==
She was the daughter of García Fernández, count of Castile, and his spouse Ava de Ribagorza. On 24 November 978, her parents gave her the place known as Covarrubias and many other villas and properties throughout Castile as well as the Abbey of Saint Cosme and Saint Damian, and other villas and salt mines in Álava. All of these properties would become what was known as the Infantado which in the future would be assigned to any infanta or daughter of a count of Castile who remained single.

The foundational charter of the Infantado and her profession as a nun in the monastery was witnessed by her parents, her siblings Sancho, Gonzalo, and Toda, her aunt Fronilde Fernández, and by King Sancho II of Pamplona and his wife and her aunt, Urraca Fernández. Urraca's other sisters, Mayor, Elvira García of Castile, and Oneca probably had not been born yet or were too small to be present in the ceremony. Urraca governed the monastery as its abbess.

After her brother Sancho was killed, she shared the regency for García Sánchez of Castile together with Jimena Fernández, the widow of King García Sánchez II, Jimena's son, King Sancho III of Pamplona, and by the king's wife and Urraca's niece, Queen Muniadona. Urraca last appears in medieval charters on 1 January 1038 in the Monastery of San Pedro de Arlanza

== Legacy ==
A tower at Covarrubias is named after her.

== Bibliography ==
- Martínez Díez, Gonzalo (2005). El Condado de Castilla (711–1038): la historia frente a la leyenda (in Spanish). Valladolid. ISBN 84-9718-275-8.
