= Martina Iñíguez =

Argentine writer

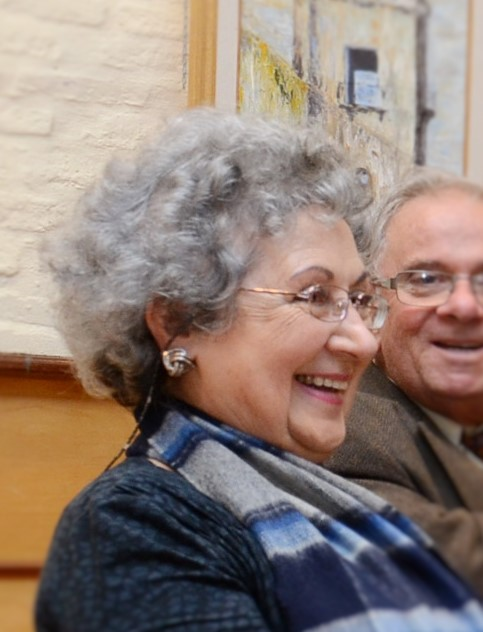
- Born: 24 November 1939 (age 86); Corrientes

Martina María Iñíguez de Monreal is an Argentine known for writing about the History of the tango. She wrote a biography of Carlos Gardel.
