= Constance of Burgundy =

Queen of León and Castile from 1079 to 1093

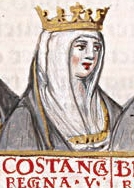
- 16th Century Depiction

Queen consort of León and Castile Empress of Spain
- Tenure: 1079–1093
- Born: 8 May 1046
- Died: 1093 (aged 46–47)
- Spouse: Hughes II, Count of Chalon; Alfonso VI of León and Castile
- Issue: Urraca of León
- House: House of Burgundy
- Father: Robert I of Burgundy
- Mother: Helie de Semur-en-Brionnais

Constance of Burgundy (8 May 1046 – 1093) was the daughter of Duke Robert I of Burgundy and Helie de Semur-en-Brionnais. She was Queen of Castile and León by her marriage to Alfonso VI of León and Castile. She was the granddaughter of King Robert II of France, the second monarch of the French Capetian dynasty. She was the mother of Urraca of León, who succeeded her father in both Castile and León.

== Life ==
In 1065, Constance married her first husband, Hugh II, Count of Chalon. They were married for fourteen years until Hugh's death in 1079. They had no children.

In late 1079, Constance remarried to Alfonso VI of León and Castile. The marriage appears to have been orchestrated via the Cluniac connections at Alfonso's court. He had previously been married to Agnes of Aquitaine, whom he had either divorced or had been widowed by. The marriage of Constance and Alfonso initially faced papal opposition, apparently due to a kinship between Constance and Agnes.

Constance and Alfonso had six children but only Urraca, born in 1081, survived to adulthood. Constance died in 1093.

== Burial ==
After her death, the corpse of Constance was taken to the town of Sahagún and was buried in the Monastery of St. Facundo and Primitivo, where her husband, King Alfonso VI would be buried along with all his wives.

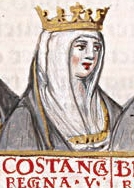
Later depiction of lady Constance.

The grave that contained the remains of Alfonso VI was destroyed in 1810 during a fire in the Monastery. The remains of the king and several of his wives, including those of Constance, were collected and kept in the abbot's chamber until 1821. When the religious were expelled from the monastery, they were then deposited by Abbot Ramon Joys in a box that was placed on the south wall of the chapel of the Crucifix, until, in January 1835, the remains were collected and placed in another box, being brought to the archive. The purpose was to place all remaining interests in a new sanctuary that was being built then. However, when the monastery of San Benito was disentailed in 1835, the monks gave the two boxes containing the actual remains to the relative of a priest, who hid them until 1902 were found by the professor Zamora Rodrigo Fernández Núñez.

Today, the remains of Alfonso VI are buried in the Royal Monastery of San Benito in Sahagún, at the foot of the temple, in sarcophagus of smooth stone with a modern marble cover. In a similar tomb nearby lie the remains of several of the king's wives, including those of Constance.

== Bibliography ==
- Arco y Garay, Ricardo del (1954). Sepulcros de la Casa Real de Castilla (in Spanish). Madrid: Instituto Jerónimo Zurita. Consejo Superior de Investigaciones Científicas. OCLC 11366237.
- Bouchard, Constance Brittain (1987). Sword, Miter, and Cloister: Nobility and the Church in Burgundy, 980-1198. Cornell University Press.
- Bull, Marcus Graham (1993). Knightly Piety and the Lay Response to the First Crusade: The Limousin and Gascony, C. 970-c. 1130. Clarendon Press.
- Elorza, Juan C.; Vaquero, Lourdes; Castillo, Belén; Negro, Marta (1990). Junta de Castilla y León. Consejería de Cultura y Bienestar Social (ed.). El Panteón Real de las Huelgas de Burgos. Los enterramientos de los reyes de León y de Castilla (in Spanish). Publisher Evergráficas S.A. ISBN 84-241-9999-5.

Preceded by Agnes of Aquitaine	Queen consort of León; 1079–1093	Succeeded by Bertha
Preceded by Agnes of Aquitaine	Queen consort of Castile; 1079–1093	Succeeded by Bertha
Preceded by Agnes of Aquitaine	Empress of Spain; 1079–1093	Succeeded by Bertha
