= Constance of Portugal =

Queen of Castile and León from 1302 to 1312

Queen consort of Castile and León
- Tenure: 23 January 1302 – 7 September 1312
- Born: 3 January 1290; Kingdom of Portugal
- Died: 18 November 1313 (aged 23); Sahagún, Crown of Castile
- Burial: Sahagún, Spain
- Spouse: Ferdinand IV, King of Castile (m. 1302; died 1312)
- Issue: Eleanor, Queen of Aragon; Alfonso XI, King of Castile
- House: Portuguese House of Burgundy
- Father: Denis, King of Portugal
- Mother: Elizabeth of Aragon

Constance of Portugal (pt: Constança; 3 January 1290 – Sahagún, 18 November 1313; Portuguese pronunciation: [kõʃˈtɐ̃sɐ]), was Queen of Castile by her marriage to Ferdinand IV.

She was the eldest child and only daughter of King Denis of Portugal and Elizabeth of Aragon, later Saint.

== Life ==
=== Queen consort of Castile and León (1302-1312) ===
The treaty signed between King Sancho IV of Castile and Denis of Portugal in September 1291 established the betrothal between the eldest son and heir of Sancho IV, Ferdinand (aged 5), with the daughter of the Portuguese King, Constance (aged 20 months).

Finished with the Valladolid Courts of 1295, María de Molina, Dowager Queen and Regent of the Kingdom of Castile, in the name of her son Ferdinand IV and Henry of Castile the Senator, co-regent of the Kingdom, had a meeting with King Denis of Portugal in Ciudad Rodrigo, where the Queen-Regent surrounded several strongholds in order to end the hostilities between both Kingdoms; in addition, the betrothal between Ferdinand IV and Constance was confirmed, and also the future marriage between Ferdinand IV's sister Beatrice with Constance's brother and heir of the Portuguese throne, Afonso was arranged. Later, in the Treaty of Alcañices (1297), the betrothal between Constance and Ferdinand IV was again ratified.

Coat of arms of Constance as Queen consort of Castile and León.

On 23 January 1302 at Valladolid, Constance finally married King Ferdinand IV of Castile. Five years later (1307), shortly after the birth of their first-born child, a daughter called Eleanor (future Queen consort of Aragon), the Castilian King, who was besieging the city of Tordehumos which housed the rebellious magnate Juan Núñez II de Lara, chief of the House of Lara, sent his wife and newborn daughter to request a loan from her father, King Denis. During the Valladolid Courts of 1307, where Constance didn't participate, Ferdinand IV tried to end the abuses of the nobility, correct the administration of justice and soften the tax pressure over the Castilians. The next year (1308), the Queen gave birth to a second daughter, named Constance after her, who died in 1310, aged 2; she was buried in the disappeared convent of Santo Domingo el Real. (Note: In 1869 her remains where translated to the crypt of the Church of San Antonio de los Alemanes, where they still remain.)

In April 1311, while in Palencia, Ferdinand IV became gravely ill and was transported to Valladolid, despite the protests of Constance, who wished that his transport be to Carrión de los Condes, with the purpose of controlling him with the help of her ally, Juan Núñez II de Lara. During the King's illness, disputes erupted between Juan Núñez II de Lara, Peter of Castile, Lord of Cameros, John of Castile, Lord of Valencia de Campos and Juan Manuel, Prince of Villena. While the King was in Toro, the Queen gave birth in Salamanca on 13 August 1311 to a son, the future Alfonso XI of Castile. The newborn heir to the Castilian throne was baptized in the Old Cathedral of Salamanca, and, against the King's wishes (who wanted to trust his son to his mother María de Molina), the will of Constance prevailed, who (with the support of Juan Núñez II de Lara and Lope Díaz de Haro) wanted to give the custody of the prince to Peter, Lord of Cameros and brother of Ferdinand IV.

In the autumn of 1311, a conspiracy arose with the intent to depose Ferdinand IV and place the Lord of Cameros in the throne. The conspiracy had as protagonists John, Lord of Valencia de Campos and uncle of Ferdinand IV, Juan Núñez II de Lara and Lope Díaz de Haro. However, the project failed because of the staunch refusal of the Dowager Queen María de Molina.

In the Valladolid Courts of 1312, the last of the reign of Ferdinand IV, funds were raised to maintain the army that would be used in the following campaign against the Kingdom of Granada. The administration of justice, territorial administration and local administration was reorganized, revealing the King's wishes for deep reform in all areas of administration, while attempting to reinforce the Crown's authority to the detriment of the nobility. The Courts approved the concession of five services and one forera coin, destined for the payment of the King's vassals, with the exception of Juan Núñez II de Lara, who became vassal of King Denis of Portugal.

On 7 September 1312 at the city of Jaén, Ferdinand IV died aged 26. Because of the high temperature during the month of his death, Peter, Lord of Cameros and brother of the late King and the now Dowager-Queen Constance decided that his remains would be buried in the Mosque–Cathedral of Córdoba. The Crónica de Alfonso XI confirmed the high temperature as the cause that motivated the burial of Ferdinand IV in Córdoba.

The funeral cortege which accompanied the remains of Ferdinand IV to the city of Córdoba was presided over by Constance. The body of the King was deposited in the major chapel of the cathedral by disposition of his wife, and it was also decided that six chaplains would pray every night by his tomb during the month of September in the anniversary of his death, in perpetuity.

=== Minority of King Alfonso XI of Castile (1312-1313) ===
When John, Lord of Valencia de Campos and Juan Núñez II de Lara learned of the death of King Ferdinand IV, they asked Queen María de Molina (who was in Valladolid) to take the regency on behalf of her one-year-old grandson Alfonso XI, in order to avoid that Peter of Castile, Lord of Cameros took it. However, the Queen refused to assume the regency and asked both of them to talk of it with her son Peter.

Juan Núñez II de Lara then tried to kidnap the infant King, who was in the city of Ávila. However, the local authorities stopped him on orders from María de Molina. Shortly after, Peter, Lord of Cameros arrived at Ávila, but his entrance into the city was refused. In the meanwhile, John, Lord of Valencia de Campos and Juan Núñez II de Lara, who were in Burgos, called the ricoshombres and other main authorities of the kingdom to be reunited in Sahagún, at the same time that Peter, Lord of Cameros obtained the consent of María de Molina to be the guardian of his nephew Alfonso XI during his minority. When John, Lord of Valencia de Campos (who was at Sahagún with the authorities of the kingdom) knew about the closeness of Peter, Lord of Cameros, he offended him in front of various witnesses, causing the Lord of Cameros to march against him. The Lord of Valencia de Campos and his collaborators sent Philip of Castile, Lord of Cabrera and Ribera, brother of Peter, to talk to him; however, the Lord of Cameros reprimanded his brother for taking the side of the Lord of Valencia de Campos. The Lord of Cabrera and Ribera presented to his mother María de Molina the propositions of the Lord of Valencia de Campos, which consisted of a triumvirate between María de Molina and the Lords of Cameros and Valencia de Campos. The Queen agreed with this idea.

==== The Palencia Courts of 1313 ====
Pedro, Lord of Cameros went to the Cortes of Palencia of 1313 accompanied by an army of 12,000 men, after having recruited in Asturias and Cantabria, and had gone to the Cortes without desire for a fight, but ready for one if the other side wished it. On the side of the Lord of Cameros militated his uncle Alfonso Téllez de Molina (brother of María de Molina), his son Tello Alfonso de Meneses, Rodrigo Álvarez de Asturias and Fernán Ruiz de Saldaña, among other ricoshombres. The main supporters of the Lord of Valencia de Campos were Philip, Lord of Cabrera and Ribera, Fernando de la Cerda and Juan Núñez II de Lara.

Once assembled in the city of Palencia, it was agreed that each of the two sides would keep only 1,300 men in the vicinity of the city, although the agreement was broken by the Lord of Valencia de Campos, who kept next to him 4,000 men, to which the Lord of Cameros responded by keeping 5,000 of his men at his side. During the Cortes, the Dowager Queen Constance stopped supporting the Lord of Cameros and began to support the Lord of Valencia de Campos, proceeding Juan Manuel, Prince of Villena (grandson of Ferdinand III of Castile) in the same way. Fearing that disputes would arise, at the initiative of Queen María de Molina, the Lords of Cameros and Valencia de Campos and their companions left the city and stayed in nearby villages. Peter stayed in Amusco, John in Becerril de Campos, Queen Constance in Grijota, and María de Molina in Monzón de Campos. At the same time, the prelates and procurators who supported the Lord of Cameros and María de Molina agreed to meet in the church of San Francisco at Palencia, of the Order of the Franciscans, while the supporters of the Lord of Valencia de Campos reunited in the convent of San Pablo of Palencia, of the Order of the Dominicans, linked to the House of Lara. Despite the wishes of Peter and his mother, the supporters of the Lord of Valencia de Campos didn't agree to any compromise and appointed him guardian of the King, while the other side appointed as guardians the Lord of Cameros and Queen María de Molina.

The double Cortes of Palencia of 1313 gave origin to two different orders: one of them granted by the Lord of Valencia de Campos, as tutor of Alfonso XI, to the councils of Castile, León, Extremadura, Galicia and Asturias —territories in which predominated his own supporters—; and the other promulgated by Queen María de Molina and her son, the Lord of Cameros, as joint tutors of Alfonso XI, and delivered at the request of the councils of Castile, León, Toledo, Extremadura, Galicia, Asturias and Andalusia. Both charters note the presence of the clergy, the nobility and the notorious men of the towns, and it was deduced from them that the Lord of Valencia de Campos had a certain advantage in the number and quality of his allies, as well as the Lord of Cameros and Queen María de Molina in prelates, masters of the Military Orders and representatives of the councils. The charter given by Queen María de Molina carried the seals of Alfonso XI and those of both tutors, and the one given by the Lord of Valencia de Campos only his own seal; this could mean that the Royal Chancellery was in the hands of the first. Finished the Cortes, each of the two sides began to use the royal seal to issue orders and privileges.

Finished the Cortes of Palencia of 1313, Alfonso of Valencia and his father John of Castile occupied the city of León, while Peter seized the city of Palencia and went later to Ávila with his mother, where Alfonso XI was. In the meanwhile, both sides tried to reach a definitive agreement on who should be the guardian of the infant King, intervening in the negotiations the Masters of the Orders of Santiago and Calatrava, as well as Don Juan Manuel, supporter of John of Castile. The Lord of Cameros departed for Granada to help Nasr, Sultan of Granada, against whom the son of the arráez of Málaga had revolted. However, at the end of 1313 Peter was informed of the defeat of the Granadian sultan and, during his return to Castile, besieged for three days and took the castle of Rute, located in Córdoba. At the end of 1313, the Lord of Valencia de Campos summoned the procurators of the Kingdom in Sahagún.

=== Death and burial ===
On 18 November 1313, one day after she had dictated her testament, in which she appointed as executors her parents, the Kings of Portugal, Queen Constance died in Sahagún at the age of 23, which motivated the Lord of Valencia de Campos and his partisans to decide to make an agreement with Queen María de Molina, offering her to be the guardian of the King in the territories in which she and her son were declared tutors, while John of Castile "el de Tarifa" would act as guardian of the King in the territories that supported him, accepting Queen María de Molina the proposal.

After her death, the remains of Queen Constance were buried in the Royal Monastery of San Benito in Sahagún, where King Alfonso VI of León and Castile and several of his wives had been buried. The remains were deposited in a sepulcher, which was placed on the cruiser of the monastery church, next to the graves containing the mortal remains of the wives of Alfonso VI. Her grave was subsequently destroyed either during the fire that the monastery suffered in 1810, during the War of Spanish Independence or during the exclaustration and confiscation of the Royal Monastery of San Benito, carried out in 1835.

Although the remains of King Alfonso VI and those of his wives are currently deposited in two tombs in the Monastery of the Benedictine Mothers of Sahagún, the remains of Queen Constance of Portugal have disappeared. A tombstone of modern marble is preserved in the church of San Juan of Sahagún, carved in the 19th century, and placed in the rung that leads to the high altar of the church, next to a similar gravestone in which a reference is made to Infante Sancho Alfónsez, only son of King Alfonso VI, on which the following epitaph was sculpted:

H. R. CONSTANCIA. R. FERDINANDI. IV UXOR CUIUS. VITAE FINIS DIE XXIII NOV. Aº MCCCXIII

The epitaph, roughly translated says: "Here lies Queen Constance, wife of King Ferdinand IV. She died on 23 November 1313". The tombstone was carved after the Spanish War of Independence, when, after the destruction caused in the monastery by the looting carried out by the French troops, and by the fire of 1810, the Benedictine monastery was rebuilt. However, due to the confiscation of 1835, the works were paralyzed. The purpose of the tombstone, which measures 1.39 meters long by 0.46 meters wide, was to mark the place occupied by the tomb in which the remains of Queen Constance, who had disappeared, had been resting in the Royal Monastery of San Benito. However, the tombstone was later placed in the church of San Juan of Sahagún.

== Bibliography ==
- Arco y Garay, Ricardo del (1954). Sepulcros de la Casa Real de Castilla (in Spanish). Madrid: Instituto Jerónimo Zurita. Consejo Superior de Investigaciones Científicas. OCLC 11366237.
- Benavides, Antonio (1860). Memorias de Don Fernando IV de Castilla, 1ra. edición (in Spanish). Madrid: Imprenta de Don José Rodríguez. OCLC 743667836.
- Colmeiro y Penido, Manuel (1883). Cortes de los antiguos Reinos de León y de Castilla (in Spanish). Madrid: Establecimiento tipográfico de los sucesores de Rivadeneyra, impresores de la Real Casa. OCLC 2676066. Archived from the original on 2018-09-15.
- Coria Colino, Jesús J. (1999). Reinado de Fernando IV (1295-1312), 1ra. edición (in Spanish). Palencia: Aretusa. ISBN 84-605-9954-X.
- Fernández Peña, María Rosa (2006). La Iglesia española y las instituciones de caridad, 1ra. edición (in Spanish). Madrid: Ediciones escurialenses. pp. 883–898. ISBN 84-89788-16-2.
- Gaibrois Riaño de Ballesteros, Mercedes (1967). María de Molina, tres veces reina (in Spanish). Madrid: Espasa-Calpe. Colección Austral nº 1411. OCLC 470262789.
- González Mínguez, César (1995). Fernando IV, 1295-1312, 1ra. edición (in Spanish). Palencia: La Olmeda. ISBN 84-8173-027-0.
- Loayza, Jofré de (1982). Crónicas de los Reyes de Castilla Fernando III, Alfonso X, Sancho IV y Fernando IV (1248-1305), 2da. edición (in Latin and Spanish). Murcia: Academia Alfonso X el Sabio, Colección Biblioteca Murciana de bolsillo Nº 27. ISBN 84-00-05017-7.
- Mariana, Juan de (1855). Historia General de España (in Spanish). Madrid: Imprenta y librería de Gaspar y Roig, editores. OCLC 8097245.
- Menezo Otero, Juan José (2005). Reinos y Jefes de Estado desde el 712, 5ta. edición (in Spanish). Madrid: Historia Hispana. ISBN 84-604-9610-4.
- Núñez de Villaizán, Juan (1787). Francisco Cerdá y Rico (ed.). Crónica de D. Alfonso el Onceno de este nombre (in Spanish). Madrid: Imprenta de D. Antonio de Sancha. OCLC 18433480.
- Núñez de Villaizán, Juan (1977). Seminario Menéndez Pidal, Universidad Complutense de Madrid (ed.). Gran crónica de Alfonso XI, 1ra. edición (in Spanish). Madrid: Editorial Gredos. ISBN 8460007979.
- Valle Curieses, Rafael del (2000). María de Molina: el soberano ejercicio de la concordia: (1260-1321) (in Spanish). Madrid : Alderabán. ISBN 84-95414-03-1.

Constance of Portugal House of Burgundy Cadet branch of the House of Capet Born: 3 January 1290 Died: 18 November 1313
Royal titles
Vacant Title last held by Maria of Molina	Queen consort of Castile and León; 1302–1312	Vacant Title next held by Constance of Peñafiel
