= Elvira of Castile =

Elvira of Castile may refer to:

- Elvira of Castile, Queen of León (965–1017)
- Elvira of Toro (1038/9 – 1101)
- Elvira of Castile, Countess of Toulouse (before 1082?-1151)
- Elvira of Castile, Queen of Sicily (c. 1100 – 1135)

== See also ==
- Elvira of León (disambiguation)
- Infanta Elvira (disambiguation)
- Queen Elvira (disambiguation)
