= García Fernández of Castile =

Count Castile and Alava

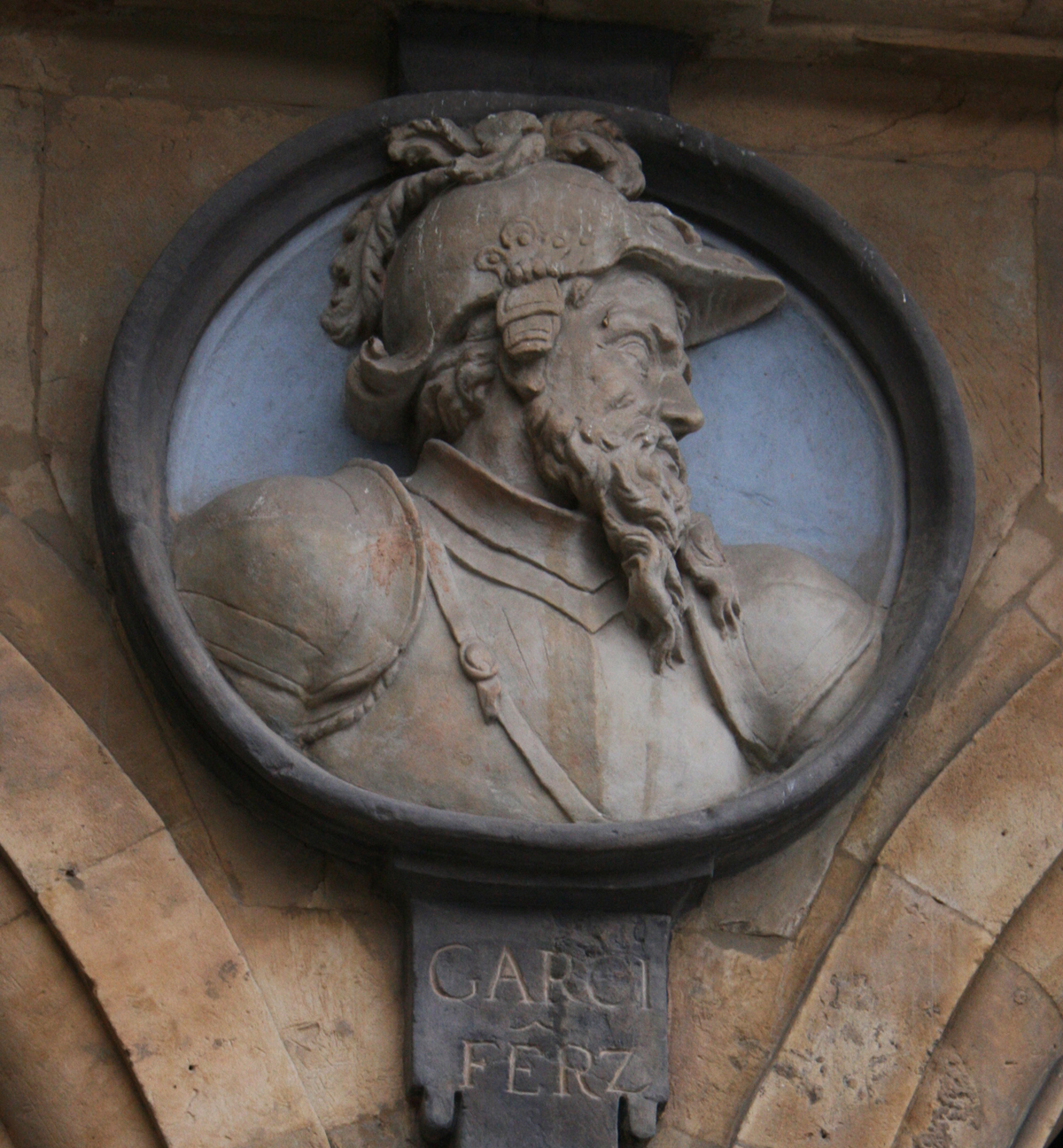
- García Fernández of Castile
- Born: c. 938; Burgos
- Died: 995; Medinaceli
- Noble family: Beni Mamaduna
- Spouse: Ava de Ribagorza
- Issue: Mayor García; Sancho García; Urraca García; Gonzalo García; Elvira García; Toda; Oneca
- Father: Fernán González of Castile
- Mother: Sancha Sánchez of Pamplona

García Fernández, called of the White Hands (Spanish: el de las Manos Blancas) (Burgos, c. 938 – Córdoba, 995), was the count of Castile and Alava from 970 to 995. In May 995, he was captured by a raiding party while out hunting. Wounded in the encounter, he was sent to Cordoba as a trophy, but died at Medinaceli in June 995.

== Family ==
The son of Count Fernán González and Queen Sancha Sánchez of Pamplona, in 970 he succeeded his father as Count of Castile. He continued to recognise the suzerainty of the Kingdom of León, even though he was practically autonomous. In order to expand his frontiers at the expense of the Moors, in 974 he expanded the social base of the nobility by promulgating decrees stating that any villein of Castrojeriz who equipped a knight for battle would enter the ranks of the nobility. He was succeeded by his son, Sancho I of Castile.

== Marriage and issue ==
Around 960, Garcia married Ava de Ribagorza, daughter of Raymond II, count of Ribagorza. They had seven children:

- Mayor García, married to Raymond III, count of Pallars Jussà. Repudiated by her husband, she returned to Castile where she was the abbess of the Monastery of San Miguel de Pedroso. With the help of her brother Sancho, she governed the County of Ribagorza which would eventually pass to her niece, Muniadona of Castile, the wife of King Sancho III of Pamplona.
- Sancho García, count of Castile.
- Urraca García, the first abbess of the Colegiata de San Cosme y San Damián in Covarrubias.
- Gonzalo García (died 979), speculated to have been ancestor of the Salvadórez and the House of Lara
- Elvira García, married in 991 to Bermudo II of León
- Toda García, married Sancho Gómez, son of Count Gómez Díaz of Saldaña
- Oneca García, the first abbess of the Monastery of San Juan in Cillaperlata and later abbess at the Monastery of Monastery of San Salvador de Oña.

== In legend ==
García plays a role in two legends regarding medieval Castile. These are set during his rule and incorporate aspects of authentic history, but are mostly fictional in nature.

In the Cantar de los Siete Infantes de Lara, Count García plays a minor role, trying unsuccessfully to impose a rapprochement between the two antagonistic families, those of Ruy Velázquez and his wife Doña Lambra, said to be a cousin of García, and Gonzalo Gustoz and his wife Sancha. This proves unsuccessful when a further provocation leads to cycles of escalating retribution.

His role in a second legend is more substantial. La condesa traidora (The treasonous countess) tells of García's wife who is enticed by Almanzor, ruler of Córdoba, to aspire to become his wife rather than that of a less powerful count. She plots her husband's death, by providing his horse poor feed. When the animal collapses in battle, García is severely injured, and dies days later. After Almanzor forces her son, count Sancho García, to flee to Lantarón, his mother plots his death as well. She has a poisoned draught prepared for him, but Sancho is forewarned and insists that his mother drink it instead. She does so and dies, and Sancho then defeats Almanzor in battle.

== Bibliography ==
- Barton, Simon (2015). Conquerors, Brides and Concubines: Interfaith Relations and Social Power in Medieval Iberia. Philadelphia: University of Pennsylvania Press.
- Collins, Roger (2012). Caliphs and Kings, 796-1031. ISBN 9781280587498.
- Martínez Díez, Gonzalo (2005). El Condado de Castilla (711-1038): la historia frente a la leyenda (in Spanish). 2 volumes. Valladolid: Junta de Castilla y León. ISBN 84-9718-275-8.
- Pérez de Urbel, Justo (1979). García Fernández (El conde de las bellas manos) (in Spanish). Burgos: Diputación Provincial de Burgos. ISBN 8471382350.
- Salazar y Acha, Jaime de (2006). "Urraca. Un nombre egregio en la onomástica altomedieval" (PDF). En la España medieval (in Spanish). No. 1. pp. 29–48. ISSN 0214-3038. Archived from the original (PDF) on 2011-11-18.
- Torres Sevilla-Quiñones de León, Margarita Cecilia (1999). Linajes nobiliarios de León y Castilla: Siglos IX–XIII. Salamanca: Junta de Castilla y León, Consejería de educación y cultura. ISBN 84-7846-781-5.

García Fernández of Castile Beni Mamaduna Born: 938 Died: 995
Preceded by Fernán González	Count of Castile; 970–995	Succeeded by Sancho García
