= Urraca Garcés (queen) =

Urraca Garcés or Urraca García (fl. c. 1000 – 1035) was a Navarrese infanta who was the queen consort of León as the second wife of King Alfonso V from 1023 until 1028 and then the queen regent for her stepson, Vermudo III, from 1028 until 1032.

Urraca was born around theyear 1000. She was a daughter of King García Sánchez II of Navarre and Queen Jimena Fernández. Her brother was Sancho the Great, king of Navarre from 1004 until 1035. She and her husband were both the grandchildren of Urraca Fernández.

When Alfonso V's first wife, Elvira Menéndez, died on 2 December 1022, Sancho immediately began planning the marriage of his sister to the widowed 28-year-old king. As Sancho was well acquainted with church reforms north of the Pyrenees and the new emphasis on non-consanguineous marriage, the proposed marriage presented difficulties. He sought the opinion of Bishop Oliba of Vic, to whom he sent two envoys, a nobleman named García and Abbot Pons of Sant Serni de Tavèrnoles, to stress the benefits of a marriage alliance between the two kingdoms. The response from Oliba, dated 11 May 1023, condemns the proposed union unequivocally. Nevertheless, the marriage went ahead. Urraca and Alfonso were married by 13 November.

Urraca took over the raising of her stepchildren, Sancha and the future Vermudo III. She and Alfonso had only daughters. When Alfonso died in battle on 7 August 1028, she took on the regency for her eleven-year-old stepson. In documents, she is always called Queen Urraca and sometimes described as Vermudo's amita or tia (paternal aunt), which has been the source of some confusion. She is also described as Christi ancilla (Christ's handmaiden), indicating that she became a nun in widowhood. Her mother soon joined her in León. She was faced with several rebellions in different parts of the kingdom by Ero Salídiz, Oveco Rudesíndiz, Ecta Rapinátiz and Rodrigo Romániz. She responded to these challenges to her authority with force, bring Oveco to heel before the end of the year.

Sancho took advantage of his sister's regency to expand his influence in León. By 1029, he had taken control of the County of Castile in the name of his wife. According to the 12th-century Chronica Naierensis, the Castilians accepted his rule only because of Urraca. It was probably through her influence that by 1030 Sancho was able to extend Castile westward to the Cea. By 1032, documents from León itself and Astorga were recognizing Sancho as reigning. Vermudo attained his majority between 10 May and 24 August 1032 and Urraca's regency came to an end.

Urraca was still alive on 1 June 1035. Her date of death is unknown.

== Bibliography ==
- Fernández del Pozo, José María (2022). "Urraca Garcés". Diccionario Biográfico Español. Real Academia de la Historia.
- Martínez Diez, Gonzalo (2007). Sancho III el Mayor. Marcial Pons Historia.
- Salazar y Acha, Jaime de (1988). "Una hija desconocida de Sancho el Mayor, reina de León" (PDF). Príncipe de Viana. Anejo 8: 183–192.
- Salazar y Acha, Jaime de (2006). "Urraca: un nombre egregio en la onomástica altomedieval". En la España medieval. 29 (Extra 1): 29–48.
- Salazar y Acha, Jaime de (2021). Las dinastías reales de España en la Edad Media (PDF). Real Academia de la Historia.
- Sánchez Candeira, Alfonso (1999). Rosa Montero Tejada (ed.). Castilla y León en el siglo X: Estudio del reinado de Fernando I. Real Academia de la Historia.
