= Urraca Gómez =

Countess and later Regent of Castille (1017 - 1025)

Urraca Gómez (died c. 1039) was Countess of Castile through her marriage to Count Sancho Garcia of Castile. She was Regent of Castile during the minority of her son García Sánchez of Castile between 1017 and 1025.

== Life ==
Urraca Gómez was born to Gómez Diaz, count of Saldaña, and Muniadona Fernández of Castile, and thus was a grandchild of Fernán González of Castile.

In 994, she married her cousin, who at the time of their wedding was in rebellion against his father with the support of the Moors under Almanzor and his mother Ava of Ribagorza.

In 1017, her spouse died and was succeeded by their son García Sánchez of Castile. Because her son was a minor, a Regency Council was formed consisting of a group of Castilian noblemen and his mother Urraca Gómez to rule until the end of his minority in 1025.

When her son reached legal majority in 1025, Urraca Gómez left court and settled in the convent in Covarrubias, where she was killed during a Moorish attack on Covarrubias in 1038.
