= Elvira Menéndez (died 1022) =

Queen of Léon from 1013 to 1022

Elvira Menéndez/Mendes
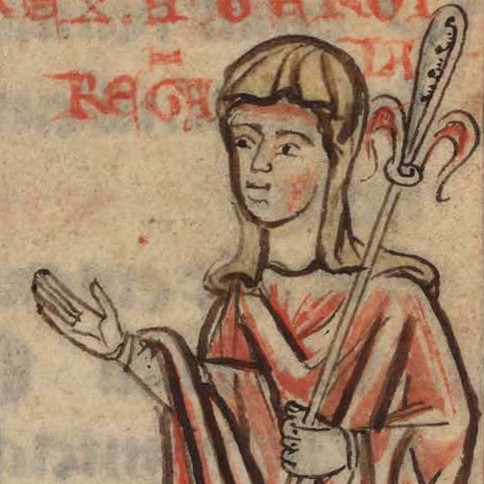
- Representation of Queen Elvira Menéndez (Mendes), wife of Alfonso V of León, in the Corpus Pelagianum (BNE Mss 1513) chronicle ca. 1022
- Died: 2 December 1022
- Spouse: Alfonso V of León
- Issue: Bermudo III of León; Sancha of León
- Father: Menendo González
- Mother: Tutadona Moniz

Elvira Menéndez (Portuguese and Galician: Elvira Mendes; c. 996 – 2 December 1022) was a queen consort of Leon by marriage to King Alfonso V.

== Life ==
She was a member of the highest ranks of the nobility of Portugal and Galicia as the daughter of count Menendo González, Count of Portucale and his wife Toda Moniz (also known as Tutadomna, Tota).

She became Queen of León as the wife of King Alfonso V with whom she was raised as a child. Her father, Menendo, was a member of the curia regis of King Bermudo II of León and the tutor and co-regent, jointly with Queen Elvira Garcia, of Infante Alfonso, who later ruled as Alfonso V of León.

Queen Elvira died on 2 December 1022 and was buried in the Royal Pantheon of the Basilica of San Isidoro in León.

== Children ==
Elvira had two children with Alfonso V whom she married in 1013:

- Bermudo III of León, killed in 1037 in the Battle of Tamarón by count Ferdinand who was married to Sancha, Bermudo's sister;
- Sancha of León, queen of León and the wife of Ferdinand I.

== Bibliography ==
- Arco y Garay, Ricardo del (1954). Sepulcros de la Casa Real de Castilla (in Spanish). Madrid: Instituto Jerónimo Zurita. Consejo Superior de Investigaciones Científicas. OCLC 11366237.
- Fernández del Pozo, José María (1999). Reyes de León: Alfonso V (999-1028) -Vermudo III (1028-1037) (in Spanish). Burgos: La Olmeda, S.L. ISBN 84-89915-07-5.
- Mattoso, José (1981). A nobreza medieval portuguesa, a família e o poder (in Portuguese). Lisbon: Editorial Estampa. OCLC 8242615.
- Torres Sevilla-Quiñones de León, Margarita Cecilia (1999). Linajes nobiliarios de León y Castilla: Siglos IX-XIII (in Spanish). Salamanca: Junta de Castilla y León, Consejería de educación y cultura. ISBN 84-7846-781-5.

Elvira Menéndez (died 1022) Betótez family Born: c. 996 Died: 2 December 1022
Preceded by Elvira Garcia	Queen Consort of León; 1013–1022	Succeeded by Urraca Garcés
