= García Sánchez of Castile =

11th-century Castilian nobleman

Illustration of Sánchez’s murder

García Sánchez (died 1029) was the last independent count of Castile from 1017 to his death. Son of Sancho García and his wife Urraca, he succeeded his father when he was only a boy.

During his minority the post of regent was held by several Castilian magnates and Urraca, Abbess of Covarrubias, the young count's aunt. The county fell under the protection of his brother-in-law, King Sancho III of Pamplona (Sancho the Great).

He reached his majority in 1028 and the next year travelled to León to marry Infanta Sancha, sister of Bermudo III of León. However, as he was entering the church of John the Baptist for the ceremony, he was assassinated by a pair of exiled Castilian noblemen, the brothers Rodrigo Vela and Íñigo Vela.

The countship was assigned to his nephew Ferdinand, younger son of his sister Muniadona and her husband Sancho the Great, who then married García's intended wife, Sancha.

Preceded by Sancho García	Count of Castile; 1017–1029	Succeeded by Ferdinand
