= Alfonso V of León =

King of León from 999 to 1028

Alfonso V
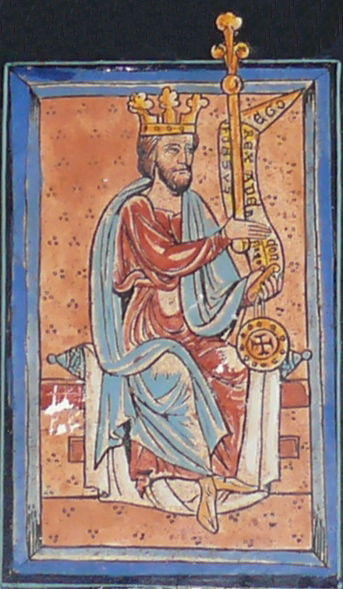
- Alfonso V in the Libro de las Estampas

King of León
- Reign: 999–1028
- Predecessor: Bermudo II
- Successor: Bermudo III
- Born: c. 994
- Died: 4 July/7 August 1028 (aged 33–34); Viseu, Portugalia
- Burial: Basilica of San Isidoro
- Consort: Elvira Menéndez; Urraca of Pamplona
- Issue: Bermudo III of León; Sancha of León; Jimena of León
- Dynasty: Astur-Leonese dynasty
- Father: Bermudo II of León
- Mother: Elvira García of Castile
- Religion: Chalcedonian Christianity

Alfonso V (c. 994 – 7 August 1028), called the Noble, was King of León from 999 to 1028. Like other kings of León, he used the title emperor (Imperator totius Hispaniae) to assert his standing among the Christian rulers of Spain. He succeeded his father, Bermudo II, in 999. His mother Elvira García and count Menendo González, who raised him in Galicia, acted as his co-regents. Upon the count's death in 1008, Alfonso ruled on his own.

== Reign ==
Alfonso began the work of reorganizing the Christian kingdom of the northwest of the Iberian Peninsula after a most disastrous period of civil war and Arab inroads. Enough is known of him to justify the belief that he had some of the qualities of a soldier and a statesman.

His name and that of his wife are associated with the grant of the first franchises of León (1017). On Wednesday, 7 August 1028, Alfonso V was killed by an arrow while besieging the Muslim-occupied town of Viseu. King Alfonso was buried next to his first wife Elvira, according to his wishes, at the Church of Saint John the Baptist and San Pelayo which later changed its name to the Basilica of San Isidoro when the latter saint's remains were transferred from Seville. The following epitaph was carved on his tomb:

H. IACET ADEFONSUS QUI POPVLATIT LEGIONEM...ET DEDIT BONOS FOROS ET FECIT / ECCLESIAM HANC LVTO ET LATERE. HABVIT PRAELIA CUM / SARRACENIS, ET INTERFECTUS, EST SAGITTA APUD VISEUM / PORTUGAL FUIT FILIUS VEREMUNDI ORDONII / OBIIT ERA M SEXAGESIMA QUINTA III NAS M.

== Family ==
Alfonso first married Elvira Menéndez in 1013, daughter of his tutor Menendo González at whose house he was raised as a child. They had two children:

- Sancha of León, married Ferdinand I of León and Castile
- Bermudo III of León (c. 1015–1037)

After Elvira's death on 2 December 1022, Alfonso married Urraca Garcés, sister of King Sancho III of Pamplona. Before this marriage took place, the king of Pamplona had sent Ponce, abbot at the Monastery of San Pedro de Tavèrnoles, later bishop of Oviedo, and a nobleman named Garcia, to intercede before Abbot Oliba, bishop of Vic, in favor of the marriage of his sister Urraca to the king of León, despite the impediments of consanguinity. Although Bishop Oliba did not authorize the marriage, describing it as incesti connubii in a letter dated 11 May 1023, the royal wedding was celebrated between the date of the bishop's letter and 13 November 1023 when Alfonso V and his new wife, who confirms as Urraka regina, appear together for the first time in a charter in the Cathedral of León.

Urraca and her mother Jimena Fernández made a donation on 26 September 1028 to the Cathedral of Santiago de Compostela confirming as Scemena regina simulque et filia mea Urraca Regina (...) genitoris nostri Fredenandus Ueremudiz et domna Geloria, and a few years later, King Bermudo III on 6 August 1031 referred to his step-mother as Urraca regina Garseani regis filia.

Alfonso and Urraca had one daughter, who was named Jimena as attested in a charter dated 22 December 1036 in a donation made by Muniadona and her son Fernando Gundemáriz, son of Gundemaro Pinióliz, whom she confirms as Jimena, daughter of King Alfonso.

== Bibliography ==
- Fernández Conde, Francisco Javier; Torrente Fernández, Isabel (2007). "Los orígenes del monasterio de San Pelayo (Oviedo): aristocracia, poder y monacato)" (PDF). Territorio, Sociedad y Poder, Work de Estudios Medievales (in Spanish) (2). Oviedo: Universidad de Oviedo: 181–202. ISSN 1886-1121.
- Fernández del Pozo, José María (1999). Alfonso V (999–1028) y Vermudo III (1029–1037) (in Spanish). Burgos: La Olmeda. ISBN 84-89915-07-5.
- Martínez Díez, Gonzalo (2007). Sancho III el Mayor Rey de Pamplona, Rex Ibericus (in Spanish). Madrid: Marcial Pons Historia. ISBN 978-84-96467-47-7.
- Sánchez Candeira, Alfonso (1948). "Sobre la fecha de la muerte de Alfonso V de León". Hispania. 8 (30). Instituto de Historia, Consejo Superior de Investigaciones Científicas: 132–35. ISSN 1988-8368.
- Sánchez Candeira, Alfonso (1951). El "regnum-imperium" leonés hasta 1037. Monografias de ciencia moderna,27. Madrid: CSIC. Escuela de Estudios Medievales. OCLC 3565604.

Alfonso V of León Astur-Leonese dynasty Born: circa 994 Died: 4 July/7 August 1028
Regnal titles
Preceded by Bermudo II	King of León; 999–1028	Succeeded by Bermudo III
