= Sancho García of Castile =

Count of Castile

- Born: Circa 965
- Died: 5 February 1017
- Noble family: Beni Mamaduna
- Spouse: Urraca Gómez
- Issue: Muniadona; Ferdinand; Tigridia; Sancha; García ? Urraca
- Father: García Fernández of Castile
- Mother: Ava de Ribagorza

Sancho García (died 5 February 1017), called of the Good Laws (in Spanish, el de los Buenos Fueros), was the count of Castile and Álava from 995 to his death in 1017.

== Biography ==
Sancho was the son of count García Fernández and his wife Ava of Ribagorza, the daughter of Raymond I, Count of Pallars and Ribagorza. Sancho rebelled against his father with the support of Al-Mansur of Córdoba. This resulted in the partition of the county between father and son, and the county was not reunited until his father's death five years later. He renewed the Reconquista by rebelling against Almanzor, alongside García Gómez and their mutual cousin García Sánchez II of Pamplona. Sancho led the coalition that was defeated at the Battle of Cervera in July 1000, but in early September successfully turned back the Córdoban invasion of his county. Almanzor died in 1002, leaving the Caliphate of Córdoba in crisis. Sancho ruled for another 15 years. In 1010, he intervened in Ribagorza, bringing about an end to Muslim domination there and leading to the abdication of his aunt countess Toda, and the establishment of a partition between Castilian-educated William Isarn, illegitimate son of Toda's brother and predecessor count Isarn, and Raymond Sunyer of Pallars, husband of Sancho's sister Mayor. Following his death in 1017, he was succeeded by his own son García.

Count Sancho García was called El de los Fueros (literally, "He of the Rights" or "of the Charters"), because of the rights or charters which he granted to the various cities. In 1011, he founded the Monastery of San Salvador de Oña where he was buried.

== Family and issue ==
Sancho married Urraca, whose parentage has not been found in contemporary records. However, based on them having given a daughter the name of a founder of the Banu Gómez clan, she has been identified as sister of rebel García Gómez and daughter of count Gómez Díaz of Saldaña by Sancho's aunt, Muniadona Fernández of Castile. They had:

- Muniadona, eldest daughter, married Sancho III of Pamplona, through whom the right to the county eventually passed.
- Ferdinand, died before 2 March 999
- Tigridia, born about 998, abbess of the Monastery of San Salvador de Oña, which Sancho founded in 1011 for her to direct.
- Sancha, in 1016 affianced at Zaragoza to Berenguer Ramon I, Count of Barcelona, and married him by 1021.
- García, born in November 1009, who succeeded his father.

They may also have been parents of:

- Urraca, who married before 1008 to Sancho VI William of Gascony and died childless in Bordeaux on 12 July 1041.

== Bibliography ==
- Martínez Díez, Gonzalo (2005). El Condado de Castilla (711-1038): la historia frente a la leyenda (in Spanish). 2 volumes. Valladolid. ISBN 84-9718-275-8.
- Salazar y Acha, Jaime de (1988), "Una hija desconocida de Sancho el Mayor reina de Leon", Actas del I Congreso General de Historia de Navarre, vol. 2, pp. 183–192
- Salazar y Acha, Jaime de (2006). "Urraca. Un nombre egregio en la onomástica altomedieval". En la España medieval (in Spanish) (1): 29–48. ISSN 0214-3038.

Preceded by García Fernández	Count of Castile; 995–1017	Succeeded by García Sánchez
