= Elvira of Castile, Queen of León =

Queen of León from 991 to 999

Elvira García
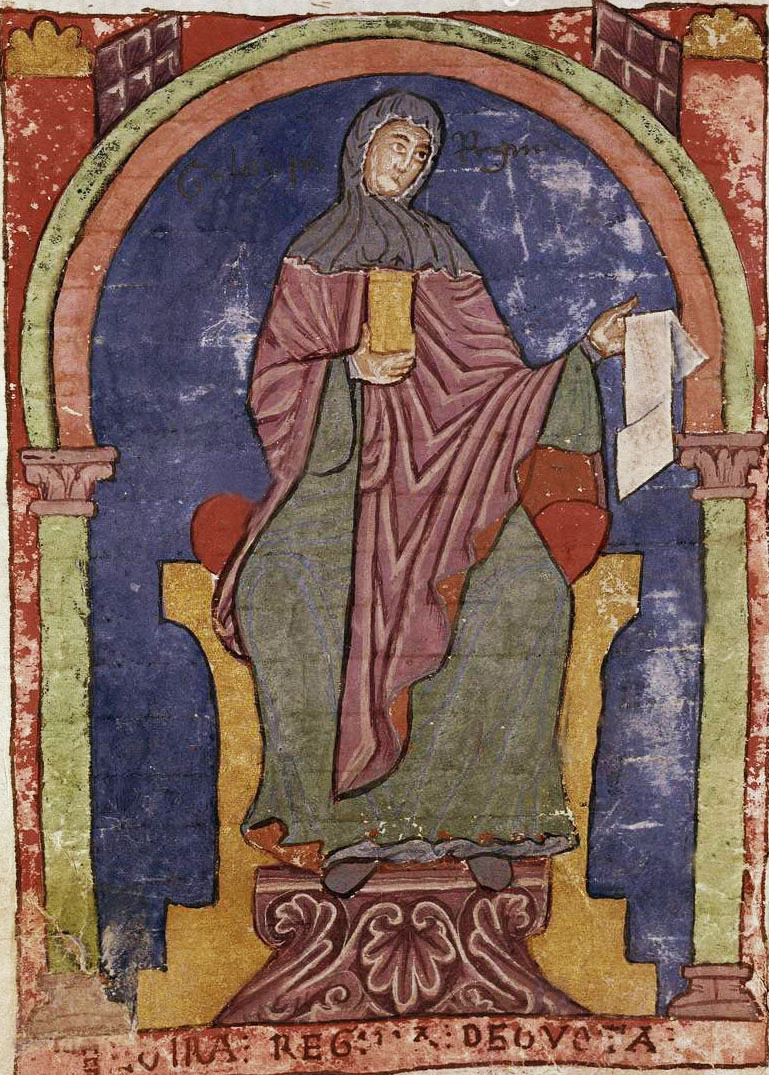
- Born: c. 978
- Died: 1017
- Spouse: Bermudo II of León
- Issue more…: Alfonso V
- House: Beni Mamaduna
- Father: García Fernández of Castile
- Mother: Ava de Ribagorza

Elvira García (c. 978–1017) was Queen of León by marriage to King Bermudo II, and regent of Leon jointly with Count Menendo González during the minority of her son Alfonso V from 999 until 1008.

== Life ==
Although the year of her birth is not documented, she must have been born shortly before or after 978 since she does not appear with her older sisters, Urraca and Toda, in the foundational charter of the Infantado of Covarrubias on 24 November that year. Her husband, Bermudo II of León was her first cousin, if Bermudo's debated filiation as the son of Queen Urraca Fernández is correct. (Note: If Bermudo was the son of Urraca Fernández, both were grandchildren of Count Fernán González.)

The marriage was celebrated near the end of November 991 and both appear together confirming royal charters as of 992. The marriage, which took place after Bermudo repudiated his first wife, Velasquita Ramírez between 988 and 991, sealed an alliance between the Kingdom of León and the County of Castile which significantly strengthened the Leonese crown.

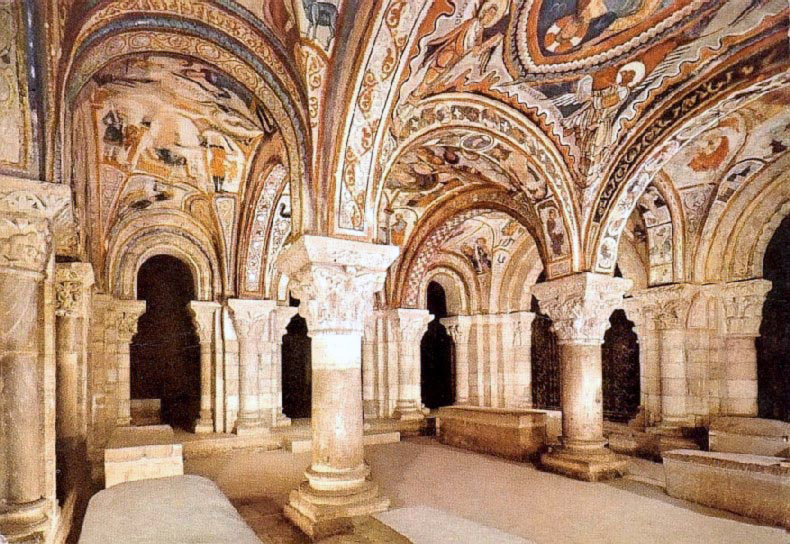
Pantheon of the Kings at the Basilica de San Isidoro.

Bermudo II died in September 999. He was succeeded by his son, Infante Alfonso, a minor, anointed king by 13 October that year, under the tutorship of his mother, Queen Elvira. The document where Alfonso appears for the first time as King, was confirmed by his mother, followed by count Menendus Gundisaluis comes (Count Menendo González), Santius, dux, Garsea prolis (Sancho, duke, son of García, i.e., Sancho García, Elvira's brother, in addition to several bishops and magnates of the realm. In 1004, Count Sancho García, with the support of his sister Queen Elvira, challenged Count Menendo's tutorship of his nephew, the young King Alfonso. To avoid an armed conflict, both sought the arbitration of the Córdoban hajib al-Muzaffar whose deputy, the qadi of the Mozarabic community of Córdoba, Asbag bin Abd Allah bin Nabil, ruled in favour of Menendo who continued to be the king's tutor until his death in October 1008, after which Alfonso ruled on his own.

The good relations between Alfonso and his maternal uncle, Count Sancho García, were broken in 1014 when a member of the Banu Gómez clan named Munio Fernández, who seemed to count with King Sancho's support, rebelled against the king. "This rupture coincided or rather gave rise to Queen Elvira's retirement in Oviedo where she died in the autumn of 1017". Elvira's presence is recorded for the last time on 18 August 1017 with her son making a donation to the Cathedral of Santiago de Compostela. She was buried at the Pantheon of the Kings at the Basilica of San Isidoro in León.

== Children ==
Elvira and Bermudo II had three children:

- Alfonso V;
- Sancha Bermúdez, who lived in Galicia;
- Teresa Bermúdez (died on April 25, 1039). In 1017, she confirmed her mother's grant to Santiago de Compostela, and she and her sister Sancha were involved in a lawsuit over the monastery of Santa Eulalia de Fingoy the same year. As a nun, probably at the Monastery of San Pelayo in Oviedo where she later died, she made grants of her own and with her sister Sancha to Santiago in 1028 and 1030, respectively. According to Bishop Pelagius of Oviedo, after her father's death, her brother Alfonso gave her, 'for the sake of peace', in marriage to a pagan (Muslim) king of Toledo. The Arab Muslim historiographer and historian Ibn Khaldun wrote that in 993, King Bermudo sent a daughter to Almanzor who made her his slave, freed her later and then married her. Dutch Arabist Reinhart Dozy concluded that these referred the same event, and that Teresa Bermúdez was given by her father or her brother to Almanzor and, being freed in 1003 after Almanzor's death, she returned to the Kingdom of León where she became a nun. Modern historians question the veracity of these events, believing that Teresa has been confused with one of the daughters of King Sancho II of Pamplona, called Urraca or Abda, who was given by her father to Almanzor in 983 since Teresa was not born until after 991, the year of her parents' wedding. Simon Barton recently suggested that though she is unlikely to have married in 993, it is possible that she may later have been married by her brother to a Muslim prince as reported by Bishop Pelagius, but that this was one of Almanzor's sons, 'Abd al-Malik al-Muzaffar or 'Abd al-Rahman Sanchuelo, whose deaths in 1008 and 1009 respectively may have allowed Teresa's return.

== Bibliography ==
- Arco y Garay, Ricardo del (1954). Sepulcros de la Casa Real de Castilla (in Spanish). Madrid: Instituto Jerónimo Zurita. Consejo Superior de Investigaciones Científicas. OCLC 11366237.
- Barton, Simon (2015). Conquerors, Brides and Concubines. Philadelphia: University of Pennsylvania Press. ISBN 978-0-8122-4675-9.
- Fernández del Pozo, José María (1999). Reyes de León: Alfonso V (999-1028) -Vermudo III (1028-1037) (in Spanish). Burgos: La Olmeda, S.L. ISBN 84-89915-07-5.
- Martínez Díez, Gonzalo (2005). El Condado de Castilla (711–1038): la historia frente a la leyenda (in Spanish). Valladolid. ISBN 84-9718-275-8.
- Martínez Díez, Gonzalo (2007). Sancho III el Mayor Rey de Pamplona, Rex Ibericus (in Spanish). Madrid: Marcial Pons Historia. ISBN 978-84-96467-47-7.
- Salazar y Acha, Jaime de (2013). "Reflexiones e hipótesis sobre algunas incógnitas genealógicas de la antigua dinastía asturleonesa". Boletín de la Real Academia de la Historia (in Spanish). Madrid: Real Academia de la Historia. pp. 275–296. ISBN 978-84-8951241-2.
- Sánchez Candeira, Alfonso (1950). "La reina Velasquita de León y su descendencia". Hispania. Revista española de Historia (in Spanish). No. 40. Madrid: C.S.I.C. pp. 449–505. ISSN 0018-2141.
- Torres Sevilla-Quiñones de León, Margarita Cecilia (1999). Linajes nobiliarios de León y Castilla: Siglos IX-XIII (in Spanish). Salamanca: Junta de Castilla y León, Consejería de educación y cultura. ISBN 84-7846-781-5.
