= List of monarchs of León =

Rulers of the Kingdom of León

Coat of arms of León with the Royal Crest.

In the reign of Ordoño I of Asturias (850–866), the kingdom began to be known as that of León. In 910, an independent Kingdom of León was founded when the king of Asturias divided his territory amongst his three sons.

Below follows a list of monarchs of León. It is, in part, a continuation of the list of Asturian monarchs.

== Monarchs of León ==
=== Astur-Leonese dynasty ===
| Name | Birth | Reign | Death | Notes |
|---|---|---|---|---|
| García I | c. 871 | 910 – 914 | 914 | Oldest son of Alfonso III. García became the first king of the new Kingdom of León, which was created from his father's Kingdom of Asturias. Garcia died without children. |
| Ordoño II | c. 873 | 914 – 924 | 924 | Middle son of Alfonso III and brother of García I. Ordoño was first king of the new Kingdom of Galicia, created from his father's Kingdom of Asturias. On the death of his older brother García I, Ordoño inherited León, making him king of León and Galicia. At Ordoño's death, his sons (Sancho, Alfonso, and Ramiro) were passed over in favor of Ordoño's younger brother, Freuela for the crown of León. |
| Fruela II | c. 875 | 924 – 925 | 924 | Youngest son of Alfonso III, and younger brother to García I and Ordoño II. Fruela was given the remnants of the kingdom of Asturias, from which León and Galicia had been created. On the death of Ordoño II in 924, who had inherited León from García I in 914, Alfonso became ruler of all of three kingdoms created from that of his father. Fruela is usually considered the last King of Asturias, as under his rule Asturias was folded into León. |
| Alfonso Fróilaz | | 925 – 926 | | Son of Fruela II. He was deposed within a year due to the efforts of his cousins (Sancho, Alfonso, and Ramiro), the sons of Ordoño II, who had been passed over when Fruella II took power. |
| Alfonso IV the Monk | c. 890 | 924 – 931 | 933 | Son of Ordoño II. Together with his brothers, Sancho and Ramiro, they overthrew their cousin Alfonso Fróilaz, and they then redivided the kingdoms that had been their father's among them. Sancho received Galicia, Ramiro newly conquered lands to the south, and Alfonso received León, becoming Alfonso IV. In 929, after his brother Sancho's death, Galicia passed to Alfonso. In 931, Alfonso was forced to abdicate by his brother Ramiro. After Alfonso's abdication, he retired to a monastery where he died in 933. |
| Ramiro II | c. 900 | 931 – 950 | 950 | Son of Ordoño II and younger brother of Alfonso IV. Together with his brothers, Alfonso and Sancho, they overthrew their cousin Alfonso Fróilaz, and they then redivided the kingdoms that had been their father's among them. Sancho received Galicia, Ramiro newly conquered lands to the south, and Alfonso received León. Ramiro subsequently took power in León and Galicia by deposing his older brother Alfonso, blinding Alfonso's three sons, so they could never challenge his rule. |
| Ordoño III | c. 926 | 951 – 956 | 956 | Oldest son of Ramiro II. Also king of Galicia. He had no surviving children and the throne passed to his younger brother, Sancho I. |
| Sancho I the Fat | 932 | 956 – 958 | 966 | Younger son of Ramiro II. Half-brother of Ordoño III. Also king of Galicia. He assumed the throne on Ramiro's death, only to be forced to abdicate two years later because of his extreme obesity. |
| Ordoño IV the Wicked | c. 926 | 958 – 960 | 962 | Son of Alfonso IV, and cousin of Ordoño III. Also king of Galicia. He assumed the throne after the abdication of Sancho I (the Fat). |
| Sancho I the Fat | 932 | 960 – 966 | 966 | Second reign of Sancho I. Also king of Galicia. After bringing his weight down, he was able to stage a successful war to depose Ordoño IV and have himself re-installed as king. His death before his 35th birthday may have been due to his being poisoned. |
| Ramiro III | 961 | 966 – 984 | 985 | Oldest son of Sancho I. He ascended to the throne at the age of 5, and so was under a regency for most of his reign. Defeats by muslim armies led to Galician nobility to depose Ramiro as their king and replace him with Bermudo II in 982. Two years later, Ramiro was deposed by Bermudo as king of León as well. |
| Bermudo II the Gouty | 956 | 982 – 999 | 999 | Son of Ordoño III. Cousin of Ramiro III. As a consequence of defeats by muslim armies under Ramiro III, a rebellion resulted in Bermudo being made king of Galicia in 982, then León as well in 984. Partly disabled by gout, he died in 999. |
| Alfonso V | 994 | 999 – 1028 | 1028 | Oldest son of Bermudo II. Also king of Galicia. Also sometimes used the title Emperor of all Spains. He became king as a child, and so was under a co-regency of his mother Elvira García and Count Menendo González until 1008, when he began to rule on his own. Alfonso was killed during a siege at age 33-34. |
| Bermudo III | 1010 | 1028 – 4 September 1037 | 4 September 1037 | Oldest son of Alfonso V. Also king of Galicia. Also sometimes used the title Emperor of all Spains. Killed in a war with his brother in law, Ferdinand, who would succeed him as king of León as Bermudo had no children of his own. |

=== Jiménez Dynasty ===
| Picture | Name | Birth | Reign | Death | Notes |
|---|---|---|---|---|---|
| | Ferdinand I the Great | 1017 | 1037–24 December 1065 | 24 December 1065 | Husband of Sancha of León, sister of Bermudo III, then King of León. During a war between Ferdinand and Bermudo, Bermudo was killed without children, leading to Ferdinand being made king of León as husband to Bermudo's sister. Ferdinand had previously been made Count of Castile in 1029, having been nominated by his father Sancho III of Navarre. During his life, Castile was elevated to the status of kingdom, and having reduced Navarre to vassalage, Ferdinand took the title of Emperor of All Spain. On his death, Ferdinand attempted to divide his realms between his three sons, with oldest son Sancho receiving Castile, middle son Alfonso receiving León, and Galicia elevated as a separate kingdom for his youngest son Garcia. |
| | Alfonso VI (first time) | before June 1040 | 24 December 1065 – January 1072 | 29 June/1 July 1109 | Son of Ferdinand I, who ruled Castile as well as León, and was self-declared Emperor of Spain. Ferdinand did not pass both of his kingdoms on to Sancho but on his death gave instructions to divide the kingdoms among his sons, with Sancho receiving Castile, Alfonso receiving León, and Galicia elevated as a separate kingdom for Garcia. But it did not go well. In 1071, Garcia's kingdom of Galicia was attacked, conquered, and divided between his brothers, and in 1072, Alfonso's kingdom of León was attacked and conquered by Sancho. |
| | Sancho II | 1036/1038 | January 1072 – 6 October 1072 | 6 October 1072 | Oldest son of Ferdinand I, who ruled León and Castile, and brother to his predecessor, Alfonso VI. Ferdinand on his death had divided his kingdoms among his three sons Sancho, Alfonso, and Garcia (elevating the Kingdom of Galicia for Garcia). This division did not endure, as they immediately went to war with each other, first Sancho and Alfonso against Garcia, then Sancho against Alfonso, with Sancho victorious and king of all of the realms left by his father. Sancho did not enjoy his conquests long, however, as in that same year, he was assassinated. |
| | Alfonso VI (second time) | before June 1040 | 6 October 1072 – 29 June/1 July 1109 | 29 June/1 July 1109 | Son of Ferdinand I, brother of his predecessor Sancho II. After Sancho was assassinated, His deposed brothers Alfonso and Garcia both attempted to return and reclaim their father's kingdoms. As it happened, this only worked out for Alfonso, who captured and imprisoned Garcia, taking all three kingdoms under Alfonso's control. Alfonso also seems to have adopted the title Emperor of All Spain, sometimes used by his father. |
| | Urraca | 1082 | 1109 – 8 March 1126 | 8 March 1126 | Daughter of Alfonso VI, and sister to Sancho Alfónsez. Urraca came to the throne on the death of her father, his having been pre-deceased by Sancho in 1108. As Alfonso was king of Castile as well as León, he passed both kingdoms to Urraca. An attempt to create a dynastic unity with neighboring Aragon by a marriage with its king, Alfonso VI of Aragon, spectacularly failed. Not only was the marriage childless, Alfonso actively waged war on his wife. Urraca did seem to sometimes use the title Empress of All Spain. |

=== House of Ivrea / Burgundy ===
The follow dynasts are descendants, in the male line, of Urraca's husband, Raymond of Burgundy.

| Picture | Name | Birth | Reign | Death | Notes |
|---|---|---|---|---|---|
| | Alfonso VII the Emperor | 1 March 1105 | 1126 – 21 August 1157 | 21 August 1157 | Oldest son of Urraca. His other inherited titles include King of Castile, and King of Galicia. He also claimed the title Emperor of all Spain. |
| | Ferdinand II | 1 March 1137 | 21 August 1157 – 22 January 1188 | 22 January 1188 | Second surviving son of Alfonso VII. Inherited León and Galicia by his father's will and the council of Valladolid of 1555. Castile went to Ferdinand's older brother, who ascended as Sancho III of Castile. There was intermittent warfare between the two, but neither was able to displace the other. |
| | Alfonso IX | 15 August 1171 | 22 January 1188 – 23/24 September 1230 | 23/24 September 1230 | Oldest son of Ferdinand II. Also king of Galicia. By his (second) marriage to Berengaria, heir to the kingdom of Castile, the ground was laid for the reunification of the kingdoms in their children. The marriage, however, was annulled and Berengaria left León with their son Ferdinand, making reunification in his person uncertain. |
| | Sancha & Dulce | 1191/1192 | 23/24 September 1230 – 11 December 1230 | before 1243 | Daughters of Alfonso IX by his first wife, Theresa of Portugal. Alfonso sought to have them (and later his son by his first marriage after them) rulers of León. The kingdom, however had already pledged to Berengaria's son Ferdinand and refused to accept them in his stead. They abdicated in his favour and instead received a substantial compensation in cash and lands. |
All kings hereafter were also kings of Castile
| | Ferdinand III the Saint | 30 July or 5 August 1199 | 11 December 1230 – 30 May 1252 | 30 May 1252 | Oldest son of Alfonso IX and Queen Berengaria of Castile, ascending to King of Castile when his mother crowned him co-ruler with her. Also from 1230, through his father, he was King of León and King of Galicia as well, after his sisters abdicated in his favour and instead received a substantial compensation in cash and lands. The three kingdoms were thereafter dynastically bound together. |
| | Alfonso X the Learned | 23 November 1221 | 30 May 1252 – 4 April 1284 | 4 April 1284 | Oldest son of Ferdinand III. He was elected King of Germany in 1257, a title which he held without ever gaining any authority by it until he renounced it in 1275. |
| | Sancho IV the Brave | 1257 or 1258 | 4 April 1284 – 25 April 1295 | 25 April 1295 | Son of Alfonso X. He ascended over the claims on behalf of the minor son of his deceased older brother Fernando de la Cerda. (The traditions of Proximity of blood and Agnatic seniority, by which younger sons would be preferred over grandsons, were not dead in León-Castile.) To retain power, Sancho executed thousands of his nephew's supporters during his reign. |
| | Ferdinand IV the Summoned | 6 December 1285 | 25 April 1295 – 7 September 1312 | 7 September 1312 | Oldest son of Sancho IV. He ascended as a minor, amid disputes regarding competing claims to his throne and his regency. His mother retained custody of him (though not the regency) until he was old enough to hold power for himself in 1301. |
| | Alfonso XI the Just | 13 August 1311 | 7 September 1312 – 26/27 March 1350 | 26/27 March 1350 | Oldest son of Ferdinand IV. He ascended as an infant, and was under a divided regency of multiple relatives until he took power in 1325. His passion for his mistress led to her having 10 illegitimate children by him, one of whom, the future Henry II, deposed and executed Alfonso's son and successor, Peter. |
| | Peter the Cruel | 30 August 1334 | 26/27 March 1350 – 23 March 1369 | 23 March 1369 | Oldest legitimate son of Alfonso XI. After a tumultuous reign, an uprising against him begn in 1366, led by his illegitimate half-brother, the future Henry II. Peter was deposed and executed by Henry in 1369. |

=== House of Trastámara ===
Royal arms of the Crown of Castile by the time of John II

Henry II, the founder of the Trastámara dynasty was installed after victory in the Castilian Civil War. Under the Trastámaras, as with the late kings of the House of Ivrea/Burgundy, Castile and León were governed together, constituting the core of the Crown of Castile.

| Picture | Name | Birth | Reign | Death | Notes |
|---|---|---|---|---|---|
| | Henry II | 13 January 1334 | 1369–1379 | 29 May 1379 | Illegitimate son of Alfonso XI and his mistress Eleanor de Guzmán. Also half-brother to Peter. Peter's unpopularity led to Henry's successful rebellion against him in the Castilian Civil War, beginning in 1366 and ending in 1369 with Henry on the throne. |
| | John I | 24 August 1358 | 1379–1390 | 9 October 1390 | Eldest son of Henry II. A dynastic challenge by John of Gaunt, son-in-law of Peter I, was resolved by marriage, with John I's son Henry taking John of Gaunt's daughter Catherine as his wife and queen. |
| | Henry III the Infirm | 4 October 1379 | 1390–1406 | 1406 | Eldest son of John I. He was age 11 on ascension, but after an unstable regency, took power while still only 13. |
| | John II | 6 March 1405 | 1406–1454 | 20 July 1454 | Eldest son of Henry III. He was a minor on ascension, and so placed under a regency. From 1406, his mother Catherine and uncle Ferdinand I of Aragon were co-regents until his death in 1416. From then his mother alone until her death in 1418. |
| | Henry IV the Impotent | 5 January 1425 | 1454–1474 | 11 December 1474 | Eldest son of John II. Henry was childless except for a single daughter, Joanna, who was widely regarded as illegitimate. Henry was forced in 1464 to declare his half-brother Alfonso as his heir. Alfonso's death, however, meant that his heir designate would be his half-sister, Isabella I. |
| | Isabella I the Catholic | 22 April 1451 | 1474–1504 | 26 November 1504 | Half-sister of Henry IV. Her succession was disputed by partisans of Henry's (allegedly illegitimate) daughter Joanna, resulting in the War of the Castilian Succession, which lasted until 1479, with the resolution in Isabella's favor. Isabella's husband Ferdinand, ruled with her as co-monarch of Castile, while on his ascension to the Crown of Aragon, she ruled as co-monarch of Aragon. |
| | Ferdinand V the Catholic (iure uxoris) | 10 March 1452 | 1474–1504 | 23 January 1516 | Co-monarch through his wife Isabella. In 1479, Ferdinand succeeded his father to the Crown of Aragon, uniting the realms by marriage, laying the foundation for the modern nation of Spain. On Isabella's death, as she was succeeded by their daughter Joanna I and her husband Philip I. Ferdinand, no longer king, then left the Castile and returned to Aragon. But after her husband Philip's death in 1506, Joanna proved unable to rule, and Ferdinand was recalled, after which he governed Castile as her regent until his death in 1516. |
| | Joanna the Mad | 6 November 1479 | 1504–1555 | 12 April 1555 | In name, with her husband Philip I (1504–1506). From 1506 to 1516, she was under two regencies: Archbishop Cisneros (1506-1508) and her father Ferdinand V (1508–1516). In 1516, her son Charles I, had himself crowned co-monarch (1516–1555). From 1508 onwards she was kept confined, with no public life, much less power, first by her father, then her son. |

=== House of Habsburg ===
Under the Hapsburgs, León continued to be governed as part of the Crown of Castile, as under the Trastámaras.

Coat of arms of Philip I

| Picture | Name | Birth | Reign | Death | Notes |
|---|---|---|---|---|---|
| | Philip I the Handsome (jure uxoris) | July 22, 1478 | 1504–1506 | September 25, 1506 | jure uxoris king ruling on behalf of his wife, Joanna I. As the oldest son of Mary of Burgundy, Philip also inherited the titles of Lord of the Netherlands and Duke of Burgundy on his mother's death in 1482. |
| | Charles I the Emperor | 24 February 1500 | 1516–1556 | 21 September 1558 | Son of Philip I and Joanna I. In 1516 he was made co-monarch with his mother, becoming sole monarch of Castile on her death in 1555. Charles also inherited the titles Lord of the Netherlands and Duke of Burgundy on his father's death in 1506, King of Aragon on the death of his maternal grandfather Ferdinand II in 1516, and Archduke of Austria on the death of his paternal grandfather Maximilian I in 1519. In 1519, he was also elected to the non-hereditary position of Holy Roman Emperor. Governing such a vast and disparate set of realms proved exceedingly difficult. In Castile, his rule was challenged in 1520-1522 by the broadly-based Revolt of the Comuneros, and in neighboring Aragon in 1519-23 by the Revolt of the Brotherhoods. Both were overcome by a combination of force and compromise. After a long reign Charles abdicated in 1556, dividing his lands between his son Philip II (who inherited the lands of the Crown of Castile (including the Americas), the Crown of Aragon, his Italian territories, and the Netherlands) and his younger brother Ferdinand, who inherited the rest. Charles died in 1564. |
| | Philip II | 21 May 1527 | 1556-1598 | 13 September 1598 | Son of Charles I. Through his father's abdication, he inherited not only the lands of the Crown of Castile (including the American colonies) but also those from the Crown of Aragon, (including the kingdoms of Naples, Sardinia, and Sicily), the Duchy of Milan, as well as the titles of Lord of the Netherlands and Duke of Burgundy. His rule in the Netherlands was challenged by a powerful rebellion , leading to the establishment of the Dutch Republic in 1579 and the Eighty Years' War, which expanded to include multiple other wars, ending only with Spanish recognition of Dutch independence in 1648. In 1580, during a succession crisis in the Kingdom of Portugal when there was no obvious heir to the throne, Philip (a candidate in his own right) invaded and was made king that same year. Through his marriage to Mary I of England in 1554, Philip was nominal King of England until her death, but he never exercised any power there. |
| | Philip III | 14 April 1578 | 1598-1621 | 31 March 1621 | Son of Philip II. Philip III became heir to the crown after the death of his older brother, Carlos, who died insane and in captivity in 1568. |
| | Philip IV | 8 April 1605 | 1621-1665 | 17 September 1665 | Oldest son of Philip III. A revolt against Philip in Portugal led to Portugal's regaining its independence in the Portuguese Restoration War, from 1640-1668. |
| | Charles II | 6 November 1661 | 1665-1700 | 1 November 1700 | Oldest surviving son of Philip IV. (Two older brothers died young.) His reign was marked by his life-long ill-health and he died childless, leading to the War of the Spanish Succession, from 1701 to 1714. |

=== House of Bourbon ===
Coat of arms of Philip V

| Picture | Name | Birth | Reign | Death | Notes |
|---|---|---|---|---|---|
| | Philip V | 19 December 1683 | 1700-1707 | 9 July 1746 | Great-grandson of Philip IV of Spain. Named as successor by Charles II. His ascension triggered the War of the Spanish Succession, which was resolved by his giving up his territories in the Low Countries and Italy. In 1715 (Nueva Planta decrees dissolve the Crown of Castile and its constituent kingdoms, including León.) |

== Family tree ==
The colors denotes the monarchs from the:

- Astur-Leonese Dynasty; - Jiménez dynasty; -House of Burgundy

—— The solid lines denote the legitimate descents

– – – - The dashed lines denote a marriage

· · · · The dotted lines denote the liaisons and illegitimate descendants

Leonese monarchs family tree

Muniadona | Ordoño I King of Asturias; 821-866 r.850-866
Sancho I Garcés; King of Pamplona ≈860-925 r.905–925 | Jimena of Asturias ?-912 | Alfonso III the Great; King of Asturias; 848-910 r.866-910
Muniadona | García I King of León ≈871-914 r.910-914 | Fernán; González; Ct. of Castile ≈910-970 r.923-970 | Sancha; Sánchez of Pamplona | Aragonta; González | Ordoño II; King of Galicia ≈873-924 r.910–924 King of León r.914–924 | Elvira; Menéndez ?-921 | Nunilo | Fruela II; King of Asturias ≈875-925 r.910–925 King of León and Galicia r.924–925 | Urraca bint Abd Allah
García; Sánchez I King of Pamplona ≈919-970 r.925-970 | Goto; Muñoz ?-aft.935 | Sancho; Ordóñez; King of Galicia ≈895-929 r.926–929 | Adosinda; Gutiérrez | Ramiro II; King of León ≈900–951; 931-951 | Urraca; Sánchez of Pamplona ?- betw.959/963 | Alfonso IV the Monk; King of León ≈890s-933 r.925-931 | Oneca of Pamplona ?-931 | Alfonso; Fróilaz; King of León ?-932 r.925–926 | Ramiro; Froilaz
Sancho II; Abarca; King of Pamplona ≈938-994 r.970-994 | Teresa; Ramírez | Ordoño III; King of León; 926-956 r.951-956 | Urraca; Fernández ?-1007 | Ordoño IV the Bad; King of León ≈926-963 r.958–960 | Sancho I the Fat; King of León ≈932-966 r.956–958/ 960–966 | Teresa; Ansúrez ?-997 | Elvira; Ramírez; Regent of León ≈934-≈986 r.966-975 | García; Fernández; Count of Castile; 938-995 r.970-995 | Muniadona; Fernández ?-≈1015
García; Sánchez II the Tremulous; King of Pamplona ?-≈1004 r.994-≈1004 | Sancho; García; Ct of Castile ?-1017 r.995–1017 | Bermudo II the Gouty; King of León; 953-999 r.984–999 | Elvira of Castile; Regent of León ≈978–≈1017 | Velasquita; Ramírez ?-≈1035 | Ramiro III; King of León; 961-985 r.966–984 | Sancha; Gómez
Sancho III the Great; King of Pamplona; 990-1035 r.1004–1035 | Muniadona of Castile; 995–1066 | Urraca; Garcés | Alfonso V the Noble; King of León; 994-1028 r.999-1028 | Elvira; Menéndez ?-1022 | Cristina; Bermúdez ≈982-1051/67 | Ordoño; Ramírez the Blind ≈981 –bef.1024
García; Sánchez III; King of Navarre; 1016-1054 r.1035–1054 | Ramiro I King of Aragon bef.1007-1063 r.1035-1063 | Jimena; Alfonso ?-aft.1037 | Jimena; Sánchez; 1012-1062 | Bermudo III; King of León; 1017-1037 r.1028-1037 | Ferdinand I the Great; King of León; 1015-1065 r.1037–1065 | Sancha of León ?–1067
Sancho; Garcés; Lord of Uncastillo ≈1038–1083 | Alfonso | Alberta | Sancho II the Strong; King of León ≈1037-1072 r.1072 | Urraca of Zamora; 1033/4–1101 | Elvira of Toro; 1038/9–1101 | García II; King of Galicia ≈1042-1090 r.1065–1071
Sancho V Ramírez; King of Navarre ≈1042-1094 r.1076-1094 | Constance of Burgundy; 1046–1093 | Agnes of Aquitaine; 1059-1078 | Berta ?-≈1100 | Alfonso VI the Brave; King of León; 1040-1109 r.1065–1109 | Beatriz | Zaida of Seville; 1063-1101 | Jimena; Muñoz ?-1128
Alfonso I the Battler; King of Navarre; 1074-1134 r.1104-1134 | Pedro; González de Lara ?-1130 | Urraca; Queen of León and Castile; 1079-1126 r.1109–1126 | Raymond of Burgundy; 1070–1107 | Sancho; Alfónsez ≈1093–1108 | Elvira of Castile; 1100–1135 | Roger II; King of Sicily; 1095-1154 r.1130–1154 | Elvira of Castile bef.1082? -1151 | Theresa; Css. of Portugal; 1080–1130 | Henry; Ct. of Portugal; 1066-1112 r.1096–1112
Ramiro; Sánchez; Lord of Monzón; 1070–1116 | Elvira Pérez de Lara ≈1111-≈1174 | Fernando; Pérez; Furtado | Gontrodo; Pérez bef.1105-1186 | Berengaria of Barcelona; 1116–1149 | Alfonso VII the Emperor; King of León; 1105-1157 r.1126–1157 | Richeza of Poland; 1140-1185 | Sancha; Raimúndez ≈1095/1102 –1159
García; Ramírez the Restorer; King of Navarre ≈1112-1134–1150 | Urraca the Asturian of Castile; 1133–≈1179 | Louis VII; King of the Franks; 1120-1180 r.1137–1180 | Constance of Castile; 1140-1160 | Alfonso II the Chaste; King of Aragon; 1157-1196 r.1164–1196 | Sancha of Castile; 1154/5–1208 | Ferdinand of Castile; 1153–1157 | Afonso I King of Portugal; 1109-1185 r.1139-1185
Sancho VI the Wise; King of Navarre; 1132-1194 r.1150–1194 | Sancha of Castile; 1139–1179 | Blanche of Navarre aft.1133-1156 | Sancho III; King of Castile ≈1134–1158; 1157-1158 | Ramón of Castilla ≈1136-? | García of Castile ≈1142-1145/6 | Alfonso of Castile ≈1144/6- bef.1149
Urraca; López de Haro ≈1160–≈1230 | Teresa; Fernández de Traba ?-1180 | Ferdinand II; King of León and Galicia; 1137-1188 r.1157-1188 | Urraca of Portugal; 1151–1188 | Sancho I King of Portugal; 1154-1212 r.1185–1212
Alfonso VIII the Noble; King of Castile; 1155-1214 r.1158–1214 | García; Fernández; 1181–1184 | Sancho; Fernández; 1186/1187 –1220 | Teresa; Díaz of Haro | Fernando of León; 1178-1187
Berengaria; Queen of Castile; 1179-1246 r.1217 | Alfonso IX; King of León and Galicia; 1171-1230 r.1188–1230 | Theresa of Portugal; 1178–1250
Constanza of León; 1200-1242 | Elisabeth of Swabia; 1205–1235 | Ferdinand III; King of León; 1201-1252 r.1230–1252 King of Castile r.1217–1252 | Joan of Dammartin; 1220–1279 | Alfonso; Lord of Molina; 1202–1272 | Berengaria of León; 1204–1237 | John of Brienne; 1170–1237 | Sancha of León; 1191-≈1243 | Ferdinand of León; 1192–1214 | Dulce of León ≈1195-?
Castilian monarchs, also monarchs of Leon

== See also ==
- List of Spanish monarchs
- Kings of Spain family tree
- Kingdom of León
- Lists of incumbents
