= Sancha, heiress of León =

Queen of León in 1230

Sancha

Queen of León and Galicia (de jure)
- Reign: 24 September – 11 December 1230 (de jure)
- Predecessor: Alfonso IX
- Successor: Ferdinand III
- Co-monarch: Dulce
- Born: 1191/2
- Died: before 1243; Villabuena, Cacabelos, León
- Burial: Monastery of Villabuena de Carracedo
- House: Castilian House of Ivrea
- Father: Alfonso IX of León and Galicia
- Mother: Teresa of Portugal

Sancha of León (1191/2 – before 1243) was briefly suo jure Queen of León, reigning alongside her younger sister, Dulce. The eldest child and daughter of Alfonso IX of León by his first wife, Teresa of Portugal, Sancha was made co-heiress following the death of one of her younger brothers and the accession to the throne of Castile of the other. Sancha and her sister did not get to reign, as their stepmother succeeded in setting up her own son on the throne.

== Biography ==
Sancha was raised at the court of their father, but her younger sister Dulce and her brother Ferdinand were raised with their mother in Portugal after the annulment of their parents' marriage in 1195. Although in Castile it was customary for females to inherit, and Sancha's stepmother became queen, briefly, of Castile, in León female succession was barred, although her ancestor Urraca had been the first queen regnant of Western Europe.

After the death of Sancha's brother (1214), Alfonso IX named his second son by his second wife, also Ferdinand, his heir, bestowing on him the title infante (1216). In 1217, with the support of the aristocracy, Alfonso granted his daughters Sancha and Dulce the villages of Portela de San Juan, Burgo de Ribadavia and Allariz, to be ruled by them until their deaths, after which they would revert to the Crown. In that same year, Ferdinand's mother, Berengaria, inherited the Kingdom of Castile, but ceded it to her son, who was proclaimed king at Valladolid on 2 July. With his heir out of the kingdom and ruling in another place, Alfonso attempted to make his eldest daughters his joint heirs. In the Treaty of Boronal concluded with Portugal in 1219, Alfonso expressly states that if he should die, Portugal should respect the agreement with his daughters.

Alfonso also attempted to secure his eldest daughter's rights by marrying her to John of Brienne, the former king of Jerusalem, but his wife Berengaria blocked this action in order to advance her son. In the spring of 1224, John was on the Way of Saint James, passing through Alfonso's kingdom, when he decided to stop in Toledo in order to see his prospective bride. There the queen convinced him instead to marry her daughter, Berengaria, and on his return trip, at Burgos, he did, his wife and he being accompanied as far as Logroño by the king and former queen of Castile. After this fiasco, Alfonso declared Sancha and Dulce his heirs, but upon his death on 24 September 1230, the people of León, who had pledged for Ferdinand in 1206, refused to recognise his daughters, and they in turn ceded their rights to his kingdom to their half-brother on 11 December 1230. She was 38 years old at the time. This agreement, negotiated at Valencia de Don Juan by Berengaria and Theresa, with Sancha and Dulce present, is known as the "pact of the mothers". The treaty was signed Benavente and in compensation Ferdinand promised a yearly stipend of 30,000 maravedíes to each of his half-sisters and the lordship of certain castles.

After the renunciation, Sancha retired to the Cistercian monastery of Santa María in Villabuena, in El Bierzo, which had been founded by her mother, with her father's blessing.^{[a]} Sancha died there before 1243, when the archbishop of Toledo, Rodrigo Jiménez de Rada, mentions in his history of the Iberian peninsula, De rebus Hispaniae, that Teresa of Portugal had had three children: Sancha and Ferdinand, who had died childless, and Dulce, who was still living.

== Footnotes ==
1. The ancient monastery of Santa María at Villabuena was destroyed in the 16th-century during a flood, due to its proximity to the river Cúa. Thenceforth, the nuns relocated to the nearby Monastery of San Miguel de las Dueñas.

== Bibliography ==
- Janna Bianchini. 2015. "Foreigners and Foes in the Leonese Succession Crisis of 1230". James Todesca, ed. The Emergence of León-Castile, c.1065–1500: Essays Presented to J. F. O'Callaghan. Aldershot: Ashgate, pp. 47–68.
- Ramón Bustamante y Quijano. 1948. Romance de Doña Sancha. Madrid.
- Maria Fernandes Marques. 2008. Estudos sobre a Ordem de Cister em Portugal. Coimbra.
- H. Salvador Martínez. 2010. Alfonso X, the Learned: A Biography. Brill.
- María Damián Yáñez Neira. 1982. "La princesa Doña Sancha, hija primogénita de Alfonso IX". Tierras de León, 22(47):47–60.

Sancha, heiress of León Castilian House of Ivrea Cadet branch of the House of Ivrea Born: 1191/2 Died: before 1243
Regnal titles
Preceded by Alfonso IX	Queen of León de jure 1230 with Dulce	Succeeded by Ferdinand III
