= Dulce of León =

Queen of León in 1230

Dulce

Queen of León and Galicia (de jure)
- Reign: 24 September – 11 December 1230 (de jure)
- Predecessor: Alfonso IX
- Successor: Ferdinand III
- Co-monarch: Sancha
- Born: 1194/5
- Died: 1248; Villabuena, Cacabelos, León
- Burial: Monastery of Villabuena de Carracedo
- House: Castilian House of Ivrea
- Father: Alfonso IX of León and Galicia
- Mother: Teresa of Portugal

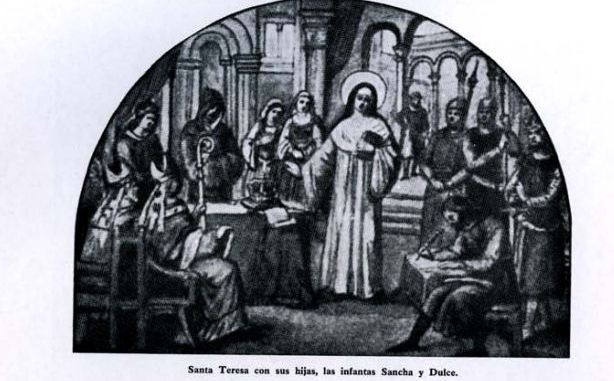
Queen of León with her two daughters, Sancha and Dulce.

Dulce of León (1194/5 – 1248) was briefly suo jure Queen of León, reigning alongside her older sister, Sancha. The second daughter of Alfonso IX of León and youngest child by his first wife, Teresa of Portugal, Dulce was made co-heiress following the death of her older brother and the accession to the throne of Castile of her younger brother. Dulce and her sister did not get to rule, as their stepmother succeeded in setting up her own son on the throne.

== Biography ==
Dulce was raised with her mother in Portugal after the annulment of her parents' marriage, along with her brother, Ferdinand, while her elder sister Sancha was raised at the court of their father in 1195.

After the death of Sancha's brother (1214), Alfonso IX named his second son, also Ferdinand, his heir, bestowing on him the title infante (1216). In 1217, with the support of the aristocracy, Alfonso granted his daughters Sancha and Dulce the villages of Portela de San Juan, Burgo de Ribadavia and Allariz, to be ruled by them until their deaths, after which they would revert to the Crown. In that same year, Ferdinand's mother, Berengaria, inherited the crown of the Kingdom of Castile, but ceded it to her son, who was proclaimed king at Valladolid on 2 July. With his heir out of the kingdom and ruling in another place, Alfonso attempted to make his eldest daughters his joint heirs. In the Treaty of Boronal concluded with Portugal in 1219, Alfonso expressly states that if he should die, Portugal should respect the agreement with his daughters.

On Alfonso's death on 24 September 1230, the people of León, who had pledged for Ferdinand in 1206, refused to recognise Alfonso's daughters, and they in turn ceded their rights to the kingdom to their half-brother on 11 December 1230. Dulce was thirty-five years of age at the time. This agreement, negotiated at Valencia de Don Juan by Berengaria and Theresa, with Sancha and Dulce present, is known as the "pact of the mothers". The treaty was signed Benavente and in compensation Ferdinand promised a yearly stipend of 30,000 maravedíes to each of his half-sisters and the lordship of certain castles.

After the renunciation, Dulce retired to the Cistercian monastery of Santa María in Villabuena, in El Bierzo, which had been founded by her mother, with her father's blessing.^{[a]} Dulce died there around 1248; she was certainly still alive in 1243 when the Archbishop of Toledo, Rodrigo Jiménez de Rada, mentions in his history of the Iberian peninsula, De rebus Hispaniae, that Teresa of Portugal had had three children: Sancha and Ferdinand, who had died childless, and Dulce, who was still living.

== Notes ==
1. The ancient monastery of Santa María at Villabuena was destroyed in the 16th-century during a flood, due to its proximity to the river Cúa. Thenceforth, the nuns relocated to the nearby Monastery of San Miguel de las Dueñas.

== Bibliography ==
- Janna Bianchini. 2015. "Foreigners and Foes in the Leonese Succession Crisis of 1230". James Todesca, ed. The Emergence of León-Castile, c.1065–1500: Essays Presented to J. F. O'Callaghan. Aldershot: Ashgate, pp. 47–68.
- Maria Fernandes Marques. 2008. Estudos sobre a Ordem de Cister em Portugal. Coimbra.
- H. Salvador Martínez. 2010. Alfonso X, the Learned: A Biography. Brill.
- María Damián Yáñez Neira. 1982. "La princesa Doña Sancha, hija primogénita de Alfonso IX". Tierras de León, 22(47):47–60.

Dulce of León Castilian House of Ivrea Cadet branch of the House of Ivrea Born: 1194/5 Died: 1248
Regnal titles
Preceded by Alfonso IX	Queen of León de jure 1230 with Sancha	Succeeded by Ferdinand III
