= Teresa Bermúdez =

Teresa and her sister Sancha in the Tumbo A cartulary

Teresa Bermúdez or Vermúdez (died 25 April 1039) was a Leonese infanta (royal princess) who became a nun at the monastery of San Pelayo. She is best known for her marriage to a Muslim ruler of Toledo, recorded only in late sources but probably historical. The identity of her husband is not certain.

== Life ==
Teresa was the daughter of King Bermudo II of León and his second wife, Elvira García. She was born in 991 at the earliest and no later than 993 if she was the first child of her parents' marriage.

Teresa was a signatory to at least seven surviving documents, which are the main primary sources for her life. In the first, dated 18 August 1017, she is a witness to her mother's donation to the cathedral of Santiago de Compostela. On 17 December 1017, she and her sister Sancha were engaged in a lawsuit against Osorio Fróilaz over the monastery of Santa Eulalia de Fingoy. On 1 March 1028 and 27 January 1030, she made her own donations to Santiago, calling herself Christi ancilla, 'handmaid of Christ', meaning a nun. These three documents from Santiago are preserved in the Tumbo A, the original cartulary of Santiago. She appears as a signatory to two other documents in the Tumbo A, dated 30 December 1028 and 25 August 1032. She also witnessed a diploma issued to the cathedral of Oviedo on 22 December 1037.

According to Luis Alfonso de Carvallo, Teresa was the abbess of San Pelayo from 1022 until her death. This is doubtful, as no other source describes her as an abbess.

== Supposed marriage ==
According to a late source, the Chronicle of the Kings of León, written by Pelayo of Oviedo between 1121 and 1132, Teresa was briefly married:

After the death of her father, Teresa was given away in marriage by her brother Alfonso to a certain pagan king of Toledo for the sake of peace, although she herself was unwilling. But as she was a Christian, she said to the pagan king: "Do not touch me [Noli me tangere], for you are a pagan. If you do touch me the Angel of the Lord will slay you." Then the king laughed at her and slept with her once and just as she had predicted he was immediately struck down by the Angel of the Lord. As he felt death approaching, he summoned his chamberlains and his councillors and ordered them to load up camels with gold, silver, gems and precious garments, and to take her back to León with all these gifts. She stayed in that place in a nun's habit for a long time, and afterwards she died in Oviedo and was buried in the monastery of San Pelayo.

Given Pelayo's reputation for forging documents, scholars have long debated the reliability of this report. Although it may contain some "fantastical elements, it is unlikely to be a complete fiction." At the time of her father's death in 999, both Teresa and her brother, Alfonso V, were children. The Muslim ruler of Toledo is not identified by name by Pelayo nor is it clear if the monastery of San Pelayo where she was buried was the same one where she had spent many years as a nun.

Pelayo's story was often repeated. Later in the 12th century, the Chronica Naierensis borrowed the story almost word-for-word from Pelayo. In the early 13th century, Lucas of Tuy in his Chronicon mundi clarifies that it was the nobility who negotiated the marriage, since Alfonso was a child, and that they acted in good faith, since the ruler of Toledo, Abd Allah, was pretending to be a Christian. Lucas presents Abd Allah as attacking León at the time of the proposal but promising to assist Alfonso against the Muslims after the marriage. Rodrigo Jiménez de Rada, whose account in his De rebus Hispanie is dependent on Lucas, specifically states that the marriage was part of "a treaty that had been agreed against the king of Córdoba". The Alfonsine Estoria de España, which depends on Rodrigo, erroneously dates the event to 984. The story also made its way into the romancero tradition.

The 19th-century scholar Reinhart Dozy argued that the story was corroborated by Ibn Khaldun, who reports that Bermudo II handed over a daughter to Almanzor in 993. She was originally held as a slave, but afterwards he freed and married her. Dozy suggested that she was permitted to return to her brother's court after Almanzor's death in 1002. Since Almanzor is known from other sources to have married a daughter of Sancho II of Navarre who took the name Abda and since Teresa would have been an infant in 993, Ibn Khaldun was probably mistaken in identifying the father of the bride.

Scholars have put forward several candidates for the ruler of Toledo. Emilio Cotarelo supposed that Abd Allah was in fact a rebellious governor of Toledo, but cited no sources in support of this hypothesis. Simon Barton argues that Almanzor's successor Abd al-Malik al-Muzaffar (died 1008) or his half-brother, the son of Abda, Abd al-Rahman Sanchuelo (died 1009), are good candidates for Teresa's husband.

== Death and commemoration ==
Teresa's epitaph from San Pelayo was lost probably in the late 18th century, but a transcription survives. The epitaph contained eleven lines of Latin verse in a style that only became popular in the 12th century. It was probably inscribed long after her death. It dates her death to Wednesday, 25 April 1039. The accuracy of this detail—that date did fall on a Wednesday—suggests that the later epitaph may have replaced an earlier contemporary one.

In the Tumbo A, Teresa is depicted twice in miniatures, once by herself and once paired with her sister Sancha. Dozy identified Teresa as the woman depicted with a crown and sceptre in one miniature, believing the artist was alluding to her status as a queen by marriage. This miniature is now considered to represent Queen Urraca.

== Bibliography ==
- Barton, Simon (2005). "Marriage Across Frontiers: Sexual Mixing, Power and Identity in Medieval Iberia". Journal of Medieval Iberian Studies. 3 (1): 1–25. doi:10.1080/17546559.2011.556700.
- Barton, Simon (2015). Conquerors, Brides, and Concubines: Interfaith Relations and Social Power in Medieval Iberia. University of Pennsylvania Press.
- Fernández Conde, Francisco Javier; Torrente Fernández, Isabel (2007). "Los orígenes del monasterio de San Pelayo (Oviedo): aristocracia, poder y monacato". Territorio, Sociedad y Poder. 2: 181–202.
- Fournès, Ghislaine (2008). "Iconologie des infantes (Tumbo A et Tumbo B de la cathédrale de Saint-Jacques de Compostelle et Tumbo de Touxos Outos". E-Spania. 5.
- Meneghetti, Marco Alvise (2014). "Teresa Bermúdez, figlia di Bermudo II: Una biografia storiografica". Territorio, Sociedad y Poder. 9 (9): 133–142. doi:10.17811/tsp.9.2014.133-142.
