= Royal Pantheon of Compostela =

Cathedral funerary space in Galicia, Spain

Royal Pantheon of the Cathedral of Santiago
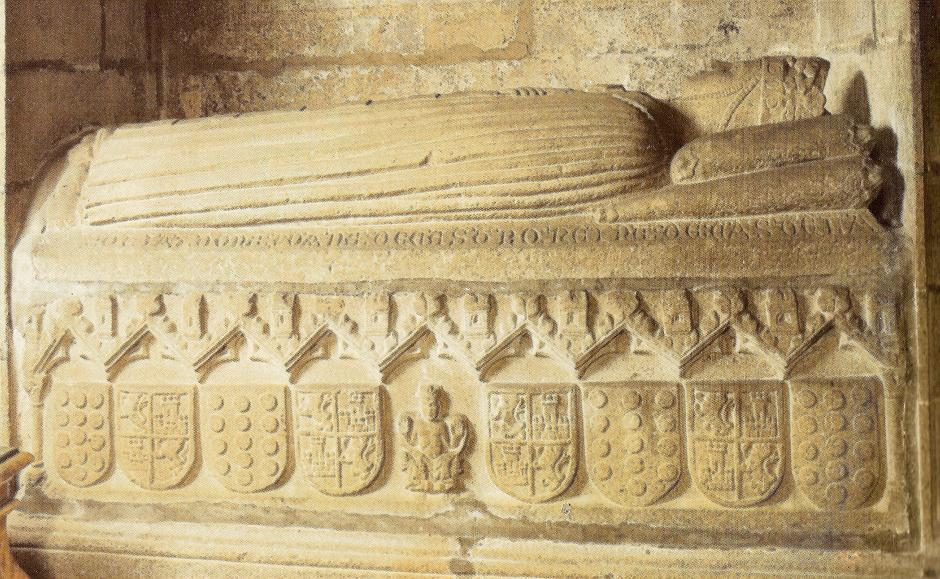
- 42.881051183923326°N 8.543519739432933°W
- Location: Santiago de Compostela, Galicia, Spain
- Type: Religious

Other information
- Affiliation: Cathedral of Santiago de Compostela
- Website: catedraldesantiago.es

The Royal Pantheon of the Cathedral of Santiago de Compostela is where, within the cathedral, are the tombs of two kings and other prominent people of the Kingdom of Galicia.

== Background ==
Formed in 1107 with the burial of Raymond of Burgundy, count of Galicia, and with the promise of his son, Alfonso VII, to also take his remains to the cathedral. This commitment was not fulfilled by Afonso VII but by his wife, the Berenguela, and continued by his son Fernando II and his grandson Alfonso VIII, Kings of Galicia and León. In the year 1211, Alfonso VIII made chapel the royal chapel in a consecration ceremony, presided over by the king along with his heir Fernando Alfonso, who is also buried in the pantheon.

The funerary space was installed in the "chapel of the kings," today the chapel of Santa Catalina, and remained there until the year 1535, at which time it was transferred to the Chapel of the Relics. During this transfer, the arrangement of five sarcophagi was changed, which was attributed at that time to Raymond of Burgundy, Berenguela of Barcelona, Fernando II, Alfonso VIII and Juana de Castro. Historical documentation confirms the burial of these five, but only in the case of Queen Juana are there also epigraphic and heraldic testimonies from the same period that confirm her identity. In 1926, a final tomb containing the remains of Pedro Fróilaz de Traba was added to the tomb.
