= Monastery of Carracedo =

Abbey near Carracedelo, Spain

Coordinates: 42°34′15″N 6°43′53″W

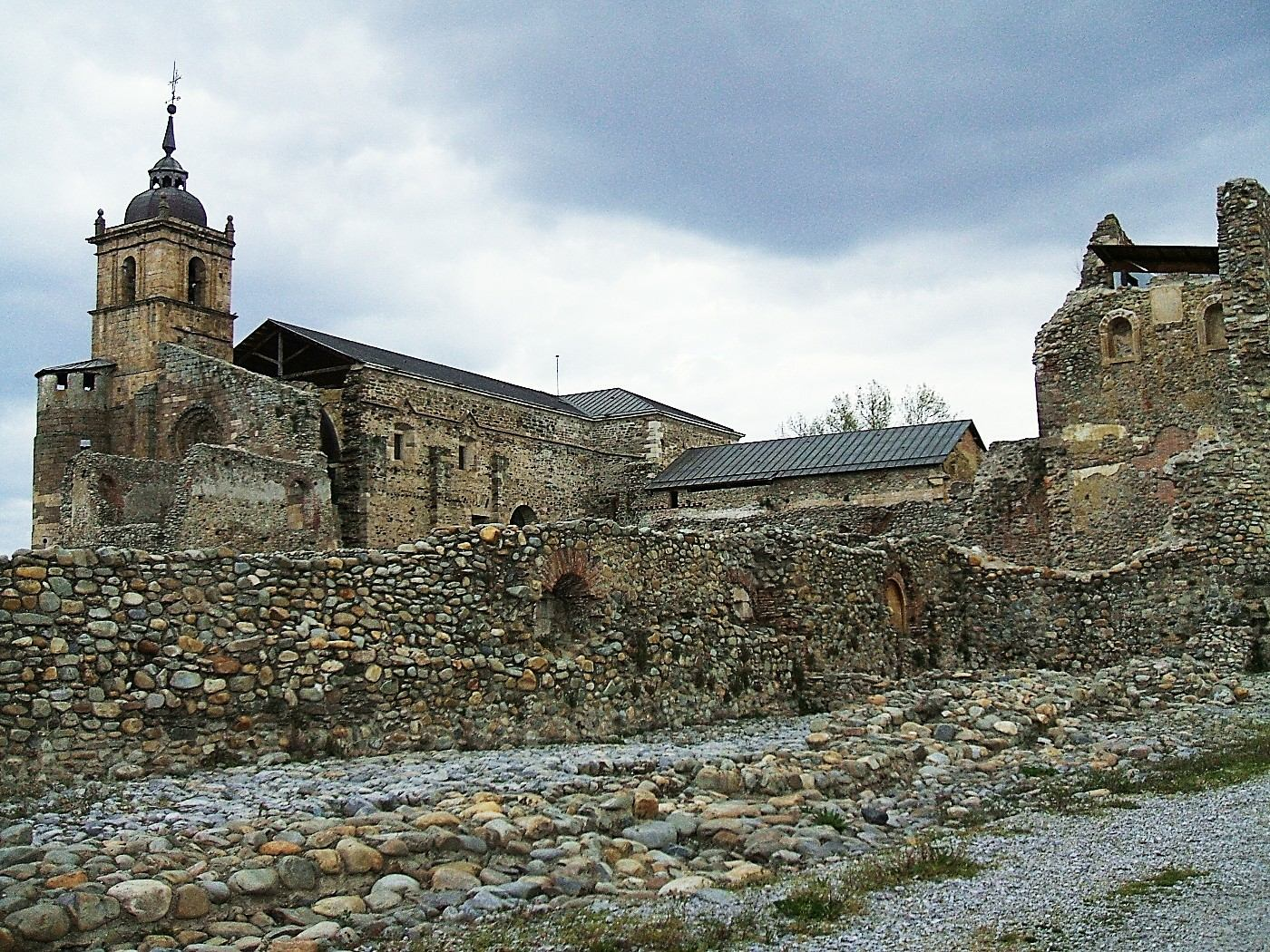
View of the monastery

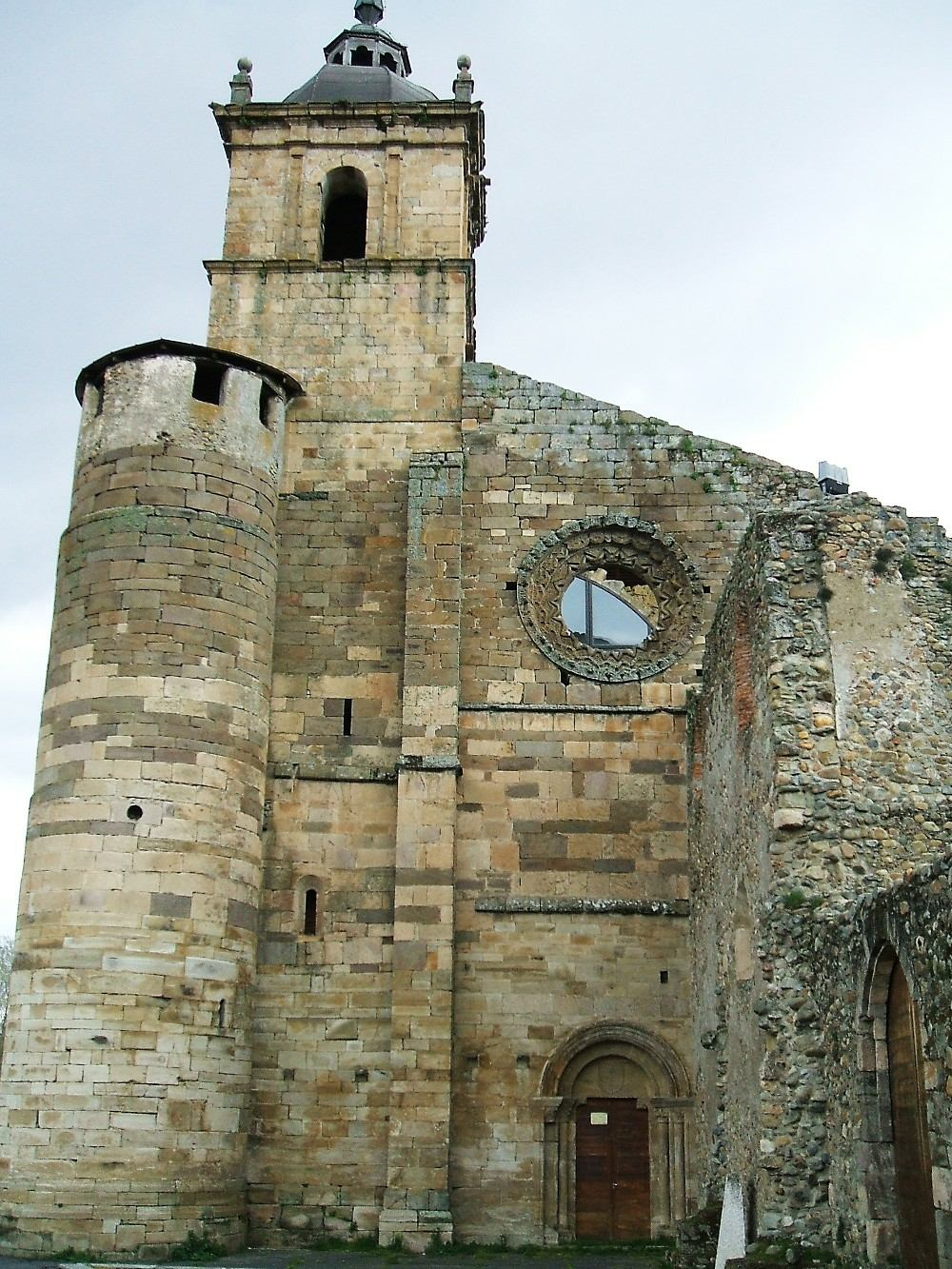
West facade of church

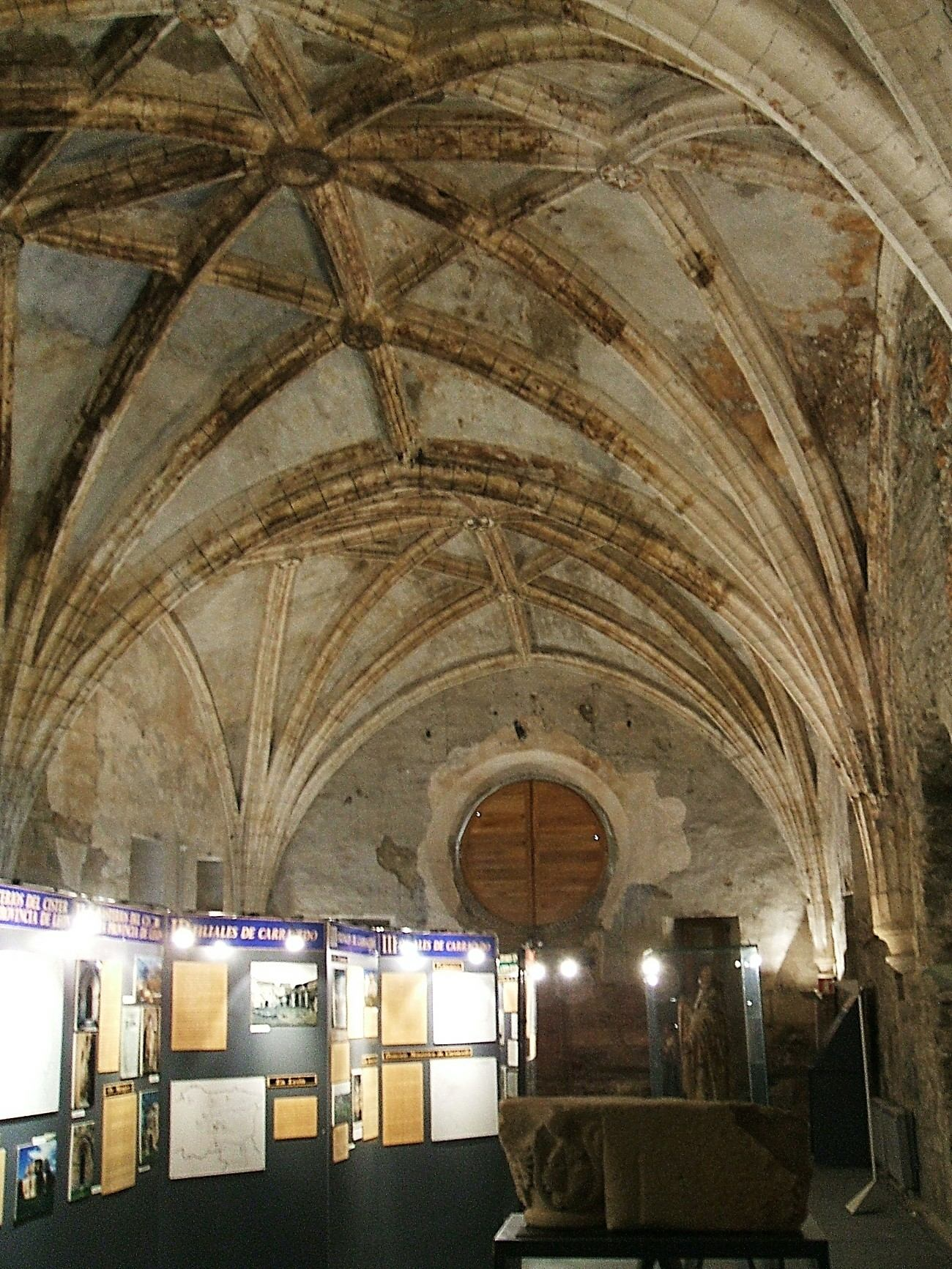
Refectory

The Monastery of Saint Mary of Carracedo or the Monasterio de Santa María de Carracedo is an inactive abbey and palace complex, now in semi-restored state near the town of Carracedelo, province of León, Castile and León, Spain. Founded in the tenth century by the Benedictine order, it lies near the Way of Santiago in Northern Spain.

The first cenobitic community, the Monastery of San Salvador, was founded here around the year 990 by Bermudo II, King of León and Galicia, with the principal aim of sheltering monks seeking refuge from the campaigns of the Moorish general Almanzor. This, however, did not spare the monastery from being destroyed by Almanzor in his campaign of 997.

In 1138, the Infanta Sancha, sister of Alfonso VII of León, helped rebuild a monastery on the site, calling on monks from the neighboring Monastery of Santa María de Valverde near Corullón, to help her. The burgeoning monastery gained eminence, and control of lands, and also housed a royal palace. In 1203, the monastic order switched to the Cistercian order, affiliated with the Cîteaux, also calling itself the Monasterio de Santa María de Carracedo. Undergoing further depredations during the Napoleonic wars, the abbey was closed in 1835.

The monastery is listed on the Spanish heritage register as a Bien de Interés Cultural (BIC), having been declared a National Historic-Artistic Monument in 1929. The now uninhabited rooms and cloister of the semi-restored ruins exemplify a variety of styles from the centuries between the foundation and abandonment, contain a variety of styles including Romanesque, Gothic, and neoclassical. The sparingly-decorated stony buildings have a haunting emptiness.

== Bibliography ==
- Iglesias Arias, José Antonio (1991). El Monasterio de Carracedo. León: Editorial Lancia. ISBN 84-86205-62-X.
