= List of Castilian monarchs =

Rulers of the Kingdom of Castile

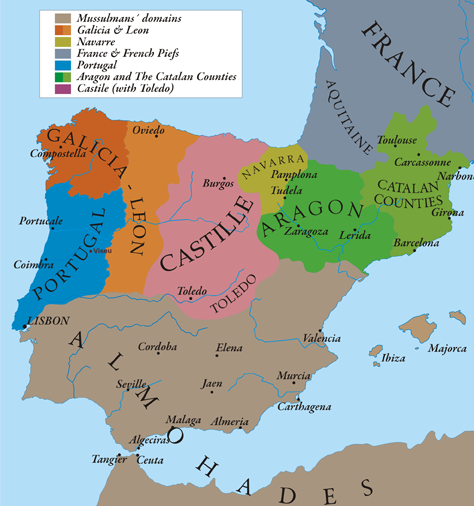
Castile in the year 1210

Royal arms of Castile

This is a list of kings regnant and queens regnant of the Kingdom and Crown of Castile. For their predecessors, see List of Castilian counts.

== Kings and Queens of Castile ==
=== Jiménez dynasty ===
Monarch	Image	Epithet	Reign began	Reign ended	Notes
Sancho II		the Strong	27 December 1065	6 October 1072	Eldest son of Ferdinand I of León, who ruled León and Castile, and declared himself Emperor of Spain. Ferdinand did not, however, pass both of his kingdoms on to Sancho but on his death gave instructions to divide the kingdoms among his sons, with Sancho receiving Castile, Alfonso receiving León, and Galicia elevated as a separate kingdom for Garcia. But it did not go well. In 1071, Garcia's kingdom of Galicia was attacked, conquered, and divided between his brothers, and in 1072, Alfonso's kingdom of León was attacked and conquered by Sancho. Sancho did not enjoy his conquests long, however, as in that same year, Sancho was assassinated. He died without children.
Alfonso VI		the Brave the Valiant	6 October 1072	30 June 1109	Son of Ferdinand I, brother of his predecessor Sancho II. Ferdinand had ruled León and Castile, and on his death attempted to divide his kingdoms between his sons, with Sancho receiving Castile, Alfonso receiving León, and Garcia receiving a newly elevated kingdom of Galicia. Alfonso had first participated with Sancho in dividing Garcia's kingdom between them in 1071, only to lose his own to Sancho in 1072. Happily for Alfonso, Sancho, who was still childless, was almost immediately assassinated, creating opportunities for his brothers to return and attempt to reclaim their father's kingdoms. As it happened, this only worked out for Alfonso, who captured and imprisoned Garcia, taking all three kingdoms under Alfonso's control. Alfonso also seems to have adopted the title Emperor of All Spain, sometimes used by his father.
Urraca		the Reckless	30 June 1109	8 March 1126	Daughter of Alfonso VI, and sister to Sancho Alfónsez. Urraca came to the throne on the death of her father, as her brother had died in 1108. As Alfonso was king of León as well as Castile, he passed both kingdoms to Urraca. An attempt to create a dynastic unity with neighboring Aragon by a marriage with its king, Alfonso I of Aragon, spectacularly failed. Not only was the marriage childless, Alfonso actively waged war on his wife until their divorce in 1114. Urraca did seem to sometimes use the title Empress of All Spain.

=== House of Ivrea / Burgundy ===
The Royal Bend of Castile, adopted since Alfonso XI in 1332 as a personal standard of the monarchs

The following dynasts are descendants, in the male line, of Urraca's first husband, Raymond of Burgundy.

Monarch	Image	Epithet	Began	Ended	Notes
Alfonso VII		The Emperor	10 March 1126	21 August 1157	Eldest son of Urraca. His other inherited titles include King of León, and King of Galicia. He also claimed the title Emperor of all Spain.
Sancho III		The Desired	21 August 1157	31 August 1158	Eldest son of Alfonso VII. Although his father was king of Castile, León, and Galicia, Sancho only inherited Castile, with León and Galicia going to his younger brother Ferdinand. (Castile, León, and Galicia would be later re-united in 1230 under Ferdinand III.)
Alfonso VIII		The Noble	31 August 1158	6 October 1214	Eldest son of Sancho III. Ascending to the throne at the age of 2, the kingdom was divided by a power struggle over control of his regency, which lasted until he was 15.
Henry I			6 October 1214	6 June 1217	Eldest surviving son of Alfonso VIII. He became heir when his older brother died. He ascended to the throne at the age of 10 on the death of his father, under the regency of his older sister Berengaria. His reign was short, ending with his death at age 13.
Berengaria		The Great	6 June 1217	31 August 1217 or 8 November 1246	Daughter of Alfonso VIII. She acted as regent for her younger brother Henry I until his early death, at which time she inherited the throne. On ascension, she immediately crowned her son, Ferdinand III co-ruler along with her. She died in 1246.
All kings hereafter were also kings of León
Ferdinand III		The Saint	30 August 1217	30 May 1252	Eldest son of Berengaria, ascending when his mother crowned him along with her. Also from 1230, through his father, he was King of León and King of Galicia as well. The three kingdoms were thereafter dynastically bound together.
Alfonso X	The Wise	The Wise	30 May 1252	4 April 1284	Eldest son of Ferdinand III. He was elected King of Germany in 1257, a title which he held without ever gaining any authority by it until he renounced it in 1275.
Sancho IV		The Brave	4 April 1284	25 April 1295	Son of Alfonso X. He ascended over the claims on behalf of the minor son of his deceased older brother Fernando de la Cerda. (The traditions of Proximity of blood and Agnatic seniority, by which younger sons would be preferred over grandsons, were not dead in Castile.) To retain power, Sancho executed thousands of his nephew's supporters during his reign.
Ferdinand IV		The Summoned	25 April 1295	7 September 1312	Eldest son of Sancho IV. He ascended as a minor, amid disputes regarding competing claims to his throne and his regency. His mother retained custody of him (though not the regency) until he was old enough to hold power for himself in 1301.
Alfonso XI		The Avenger	7 September 1312	26 March 1350	Eldest son of Ferdinand IV. He ascended as an infant, and was under a divided regency of multiple relatives until he took power in 1325. His passion for his mistress led to her having 10 illegitimate children by him, one of whom, the future Henry II, deposed and executed Alfonso's son and successor, Peter.
Peter		The Cruel	26 March 1350	23 March 1369	Eldest legitimate son of Alfonso XI. After a tumultuous reign, an uprising against him began in 1366, led by his illegitimate half-brother, the future Henry II. Peter was deposed and executed by Henry in 1369.

=== Civil War ===
In 1366, Peter's conduct led to an uprising by his illegitimate half-brother Henry with support from France and Aragon. After three years, Henry triumphed in 1369, and personally executed Peter.

=== House of Trastámara ===
Royal arms of the Crown of Castile by the time of John II

Henry II, the founder of the Trastámara dynasty was installed after victory in the Castilian Civil War.

Monarch	Image	Epithet	Began	Ended	Notes
Henry II		The Fratricidal	23 March 1369	29 May 1379	Illegitimate son of Alfonso XI and his mistress Eleanor de Guzmán. Also half-brother to Peter. Peter's unpopularity led to Henry's successful rebellion against him in the Castilian Civil War, beginning in 1366 and ending in 1369 with Henry on the throne.
John I			29 May 1379	9 October 1390	Eldest son of Henry II. A dynastic challenge by John of Gaunt, son-in-law of Peter I, was resolved by marriage, with John I's son Henry taking John of Gaunt's daughter Catherine as his wife and queen.
Henry III		The Infirm	9 October 1390	25 December 1406	Eldest son of John I. He was age 11 on ascension, but after an unstable regency, took power while still only 13.
John II			25 December 1406	21 July 1454	Eldest son of Henry III. He was a minor on ascension, and so placed under a regency. From 1406, his mother Catherine and uncle Ferdinand I of Aragon were co-regents until his death in 1416. From then his mother alone until her death in 1418.
Henry IV		The Impotent	21 July 1454	11 December 1474	Eldest son of John II. Henry was childless except for a single daughter, Joanna, who was widely regarded as illegitimate. Henry was forced in 1464 to declare his half-brother Alfonso as his heir. Alfonso's death, however, meant that his heir designate would be his half-sister, Isabella I.
Isabella I		The Catholic	11 December 1474	26 November 1504	Half-sister of Henry IV. Her succession was disputed by partisans of Henry's (allegedly illegitimate) daughter Joanna, resulting in the War of the Castilian Succession, which lasted until 1479, with the resolution in Isabella's favor. Isabella's husband Ferdinand, ruled with her as co-monarch of Castile, while on his ascension to the Crown of Aragon, she ruled as co-monarch of Aragon.
Ferdinand V		The Catholic	15 January 1475	26 November 1504	Co-monarch through his wife Isabella. In 1479, Ferdinand succeeded his father to the Crown of Aragon, uniting the realms by marriage, laying the foundation for the modern nation of Spain. On Isabella's death, as she was succeeded by their daughter Joanna I and her husband Philip I. Ferdinand, no longer king, then left the Castile and returned to Aragon. But after her husband Philip's death in 1506, Joanna proved unable to rule, and Ferdinand was recalled, after which he governed Castile as her regent until his death in 1516.
Joanna I		The mad	26 November 1504	12 April 1555	In name, with her husband Philip I (1504–1506). From 1506 to 1516, she was under two regencies: Archbishop Cisneros (1506-1508) and her father Ferdinand V (1508–1516). In 1516, her son Charles I, had himself crowned co-monarch (1516–1555). From 1508 onwards she was kept confined, with no public life, much less power, first by her father, then her son.

=== House of Habsburg ===
Coat of arms of Philip I

Monarch	Image	Epithet	Began	Ended	Notes
Philip I		The Handsome	26 November 1504	25 September 1506	jure uxoris king ruling on behalf of his wife, Joanna I. As the Eldest son of Mary of Burgundy, Philip also inherited the titles of Lord of the Netherlands and Duke of Burgundy on his mother's death in 1482.
Charles I		The Emperor	13 March 1516	16 January 1556	Son of Philip I and Joanna I. In 1516 he was made co-monarch with his mother, becoming sole monarch of Castile on her death in 1555. Charles also inherited the titles Lord of the Netherlands and Duke of Burgundy on his father's death in 1506, King of Aragon on the death of his maternal grandfather Ferdinand II in 1516, and Archduke of Austria on the death of his paternal grandfather Maximilian I in 1519. In 1519, he was also elected to the non-hereditary position of Holy Roman Emperor. Governing such a vast and disparate set of realms proved exceedingly difficult. In Castile, his rule was challenged in 1520-1522 by the broadly-based Revolt of the Comuneros, and in neighboring Aragon in 1519-23 by the Revolt of the Brotherhoods. Both were overcome by a combination of force and compromise. After a long reign Charles abdicated in 1556, dividing his lands between his son Philip II (who inherited the lands of the Crown of Castile (including the Americas), the Crown of Aragon, his Italian territories, and the Netherlands) and his younger brother Ferdinand, who inherited the rest. Charles died in 1558.
Philip II		The Prudent	16 January 1556	13 September 1598	Son of Charles I. Through his father's abdication, he inherited not only the lands of the Crown of Castile (including the American colonies) but also those from the Crown of Aragon, (including the kingdoms of Naples, Sardinia, and Sicily), the Duchy of Milan, as well as the titles of Lord of the Netherlands and Duke of Burgundy. His rule in the Netherlands was challenged by a powerful rebellion, leading to the establishment of the Dutch Republic in 1579 and the Eighty Years' War, which expanded to include multiple other wars, ending only with Spanish recognition of Dutch independence in 1648. In 1580, during a succession crisis in the Kingdom of Portugal when there was no obvious heir to the throne, Philip (a candidate in his own right) invaded and was made king that same year. Through his marriage to Mary I of England in 1554, Philip was nominal King of England until her death, but he never exercised any power there.
Philip III		The Pious	13 September 1598	31 March 1621	Son of Philip II. Philip III became heir to the crown after the death of his older brother, Carlos, who died insane and in captivity in 1568.
Philip IV		The Great	31 March 1621	17 September 1665	Eldest son of Philip III. A revolt against Philip in Portugal led to Portugal's regaining its independence in the Portuguese Restoration War, from 1640-1668.
Charles II		The Bewitched	17 September 1665	1 November 1700	Eldest surviving son of Philip IV. (Two older brothers died young.) His reign was marked by his life-long ill-health and he died childless, leading to the War of the Spanish Succession, from 1701 to 1714.

=== House of Bourbon ===
Coat of arms of Philip V

Monarch	Image	Epithet	Began	Ended	Notes
Philip V			1 November 1700	1715 (Nueva Planta decrees dissolved the Crown of Castile)	Named as successor by Charles II. His ascension triggered the War of the Spanish Succession, which was resolved by his giving up his territories in the Low Countries and Italy. In 1715, the Nueva Planta decrees dissolved the Crown of Castile.

The Crown of Castile existed in its own right within the Spanish crown and with its own law until the arrival of the Bourbon dynasty after the War of Spanish Succession.

== See also ==
- List of Castilian consorts
- Kingdom of Castile
- List of Aragonese monarchs
- List of Leonese monarchs
- List of Navarrese monarchs
- List of Spanish monarchs
- Family tree of Spanish monarchs
