= Treaty of Benavente =

1230 agreement uniting kingdoms of León and Castile

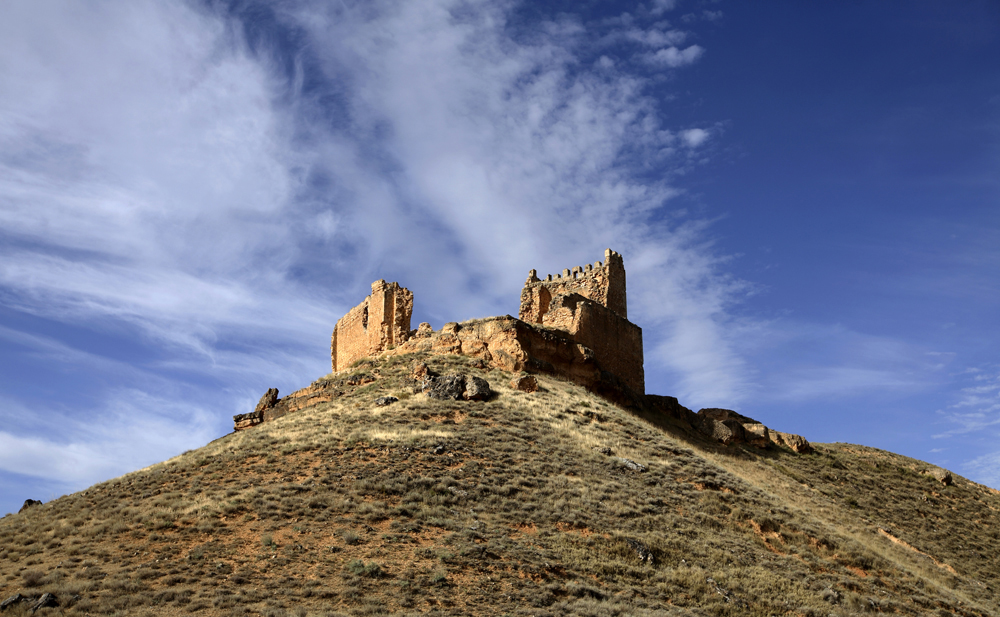
The castle of Monteagudo, one of those given to the Leonese princesses as a guarantee of the treaty

The Treaty of Benavente, signed on 11 December 1230, was the agreement by which Sancha and Dulce, the heiresses of the Kingdom of León, renounced their throne to their brother, King Ferdinand III of Castile, thus uniting the kingdoms of León and Castile into the Crown of Castile.

== Background ==
The infantas (princesses) Sancha and Dulce were the daughters of Alfonso IX of León by his marriage to Theresa of Portugal. Ferdinand was his son by his marriage to Berenguela of Castile, which was annulled in 1204. The Treaty of Cabreros of 1206 confirmed Ferdinand's right to inherit the Leonese throne. In 1217, Berenguela inherited the Castilian throne and promptly abdicated in favour of her son. On 26 November 1217, a peace treaty was signed between Castile and León whereby Alfonso IX recognized his son as king of Castile but excluded him from the Leonese succession in favour of his uncle, Alfonso IX's younger brother, Sancho Fernández, or in the event of the latter's premature death, Sancha and Dulce.

By 1221—Sancho having died in 1220—the princesses were generally recognized as co-heiresses of Alfonso IX, although a faction within the kingdom preferred to see Ferdinand succeed his father. Alfonso IX died on 24 September 1230. The princesses reached the city of León first, but "were not received as they wished", in the words of the Chronica latina regum Castellae. Ferdinand lifted the siege of Jaén and returned to Castile to prepare to take León. He was acclaimed the capital of León and by early November was styling himself "king of Castile and León".

== Negotiations ==
Realizing the weakness of her daughters' position, Theresa of Portugal sent envoys to Berenguela offering to negotiate in Berenguela's own town of Valencia. Theresa, Sancha, Dulce and Berenguela met in Valencia, while Ferdinand remained in León. According to Rodrigo Jiménez de Rada's De rebus Hispaniae:

. . . the noble queen [Berenguela] so greatly feared the ravaging of the kingdom and the poor that she arranged for the king to stay in León while she went to Valencia to negotiate an agreement with Queen Teresa. When the two queens had met in Valencia, the great acuity of the noble Queen Berenguela arranged things so that the king's sisters returned everything that they held to the king and were satisfied with the provisions that the king and the noble queen assigned to them. And if they had ever had any right to the kingdom, they renounced it absolutely. Once this agreement had been confirmed, the king came, and thereupon we all went to Benavente, to which place the infantas, daughters of Queen Teresa, also came.

The treaty was sealed in Benavente on 11 December 1230 "between don Fernando, king of Castile and Toledo, of León and Galicia, and the infantas his sisters, doña Sancha and doña Dulce" in the presence of Theresa and Berenguela.

== Terms ==
According to the treaty, Ferdinand was to pay the princesses an annuity of 30,000 maravedíes for life. This was to derived in part from the income of various places assigned to the princesses. These places were Avilés with its port and saltworks, A Coruña with its port and the storerooms of 19 towns, mostly in Asturias:

- Valduerna
- Palacio
- Turge
- Valdeorras
- Villanova sine Fonte Cubierta
- Castriel
- Vega
- Francelos
- Gijón
- Deva
- Candamio
- Grado
- Lena
- Lena de Aller
- Tudela
- Cangas
- Sierra
- Navia
- Allandia

In all these places the king was to retain control of the coinage, the garrison and the administration of justice. In the event that the income from these places was not sufficient for the annuity, the remainder would be paid from the martiniega (a kind of tax) owed by the towns of Mayorga, Toro, Zamora, Salamanca, Alba and Ledesma in León.

Twelve castles were to be turned over to the princesses as a guarantee of the treaty: Aguilar, Monteagudo, Ardón, Castrogonzalo and Belvís in León and Lobancana, Cabreira, Candrei, Allariz, Santa Cruz, San Juan de Peña Cornera and Milmanda in Galicia. Ferdinand had the right to appoint castellans to serve at his pleasure, but these were to be vassals of both him and the princesses and would receive possession of the castles from officers of the latter.

In the event that one of the princesses died or married, she surrendered her half of the annuity to the crown and the other could choose six of the twelve castles to retain as her guarantee. All the castles were to revert to the crown when both princesses were dead or married.

Ferdinand promised to procure a papal guarantee of protection for the princesses. They renounced all their castles, both those in their direct power and those held by their vassals, promising to hand them over to the king. Finally, they renounced any claim to the throne.

== Bibliography ==
- Bianchini, Janna (2012). The Queen's Hand: Power and Authority in the Reign of Berenguela of Castile. University of Pennsylvania Press.
- Salvador Martínez, H. (2010). Alfonso X, the Learned: A Biography. Brill. ISBN 978-90-04-18147-2.
- Rodríguez López, Ana (1994). La consolidación territorial de la monarquía feudal castellana: expansión y fronteras durante el reinado de Fernando III. Consejo Superior de Investigaciones Científicas.
