= Chronicon Compostellanum =

The Chronicon Compostellanum (Galician: Cronicón compostelán, Spanish: Cronicón compostelano) is a narrative Latin chronicle of the history of Spain from the arrival of the Visigoths (which it dates to 362) until the death of Queen Urraca of León on 8 March 1126. (Note: Although it dates it to sexto Idus Martii in Era MCLXIIII, that is, 10 March 1126.) It was probably written shortly after this date, and probably in Galicia. It covers the history of the Visigothic kingdom and their successors, the Kingdom of Asturias, rapidly, incorporating the Laterculum regum ovetensium ("List of the kings of Oviedo"), a regnal list of the Asturian monarchy from Pelagius to Alfonso II written sometime after 791 and also incorporated in the Chronicon Iriense and the Annales Portugalenses veteres. For the eleventh-century Kingdom of León it is the earliest surviving source after the Historia silense (1109–18). The cause of Urraca's death—in labour with the child of her lover, Pedro González de Lara—is recorded in the Chronicon. Its first editor and publisher, Enrique Flórez, in his twenty-eighth preliminary note to the appendix of Latin documents in the twenty-third volume of his España Sagrada, described the text thus:

Este documento fue escrito en unas copias de la Historia Compostelana, que tuve al tiempo de publicar aquella Historia, y por esto le doy nombre de Chronicon, tomado de uno de aquellos Codices, porque tampoco está en todos, pues no es obra de sus Autores, sino de algun posterior, y nada afecto a la Reyna D. Urraca, madre de D. Alfonso VII. Su copia salió muy errada en los numeros del principio: pero tiene muchas individualidades acerca de los hijos de D. Fernando I. por lo que, y habiendole ya citado en otras partes, le damos con los otros.	This document was written in some copies of the Historia Compostelana, that I had at the time of publishing that Historia, and for this reason I gave it the name of Chronicon, taken from one of those codices, because neither is it in all of them, nor is it the work of its authors, rather of one writing later and with no affection for the queen Doña Urraca, mother of Don Alfonso VII. Its copying has left it quite erroneous in the numbers towards the beginning: but it has many unique facts about the sons of Don Ferdinand I for which, having already cited them in other places, they are given with the others.

== Editions ==
- Enrique Flórez, ed. "Chronicon ex Historiæ Compostellanæ Codice. Nunc primum editum." España Sagrada, XX (1765), 608–13, and XXIII (1767), 325–28. Madrid.
- Emma Falque Rey, ed. "Chronicon Compostellanum," Habis, 14(1983):73–83.
