= Sancha Raimúndez =

- Infanta of León and Castile
- Born: c. 1095/1102
- Died: 28 February 1159; León
- Burial: Basilica of San Isidoro
- House: Castilian House of Ivrea
- Father: Raymond of Burgundy
- Mother: Urraca of León

Sancha Raimúndez (c. 1095/1102 – 28 February 1159) was a Leonese infanta, the daughter of Queen Urraca of León and Castile and Raymond of Burgundy. She was the older sister of Alfonso VII of León.

== Biography ==
Sancha Raimúndez of León is thought to have been born between the years 1095 - year of her parents' marriage - and 1102. Daughter of Queen Urraca of León and Raymond of Burgundy, she was the sister of Alfonso VII of León, who inherited the throne of León and Castlie after their mother's death.

She was brought up by her mother, Urraca, along with her aunts, the infantas Sancha and Elvira, daughters of Alfonso VI of León and Castile, who at the time enjoyed the possession of the Infantado, a set of monasteries and churches throughout the kingdom, whose revenue was designed to support unmarried infantas. There properties reverted to the Crown upon the death of the incumbents, as in the case of Infanta Sancha, who also held Infantados in the kingdoms of Leon, Castile and Galicia.

Her mother Urraca died in 1126 and was succeeded by Sancha's brother Alfonso VII. He named Sancha queen, a precedent set by their grandfather Alfonso VI when he conferred the title of queen on Urraca of Zamora, his sister. Infanta-Queen Sancha then became one of the closest advisor and collaborator of her brother the king and her name appear in nearly all of her brother's public documents.

In 1127, her brother the king granted her the Infantado, which made her the lady of several of the most important monasteries of the kingdom, including San Isidoro de León. She first took possession of the Infantado of León, and later, those of Galicia and Asturias. She inherited all the Infantados in the kingdoms of Leon and Castile, Asturias which included the Infantado of Covarrubias, Valle del Torío, León, Tierra de Campos, and El Bierzo. In 1138, she promoted the restoration of the Monasterio de Santa María de Carracedo, ceding it to the monks of the Monastery of Santa María de Valverde in Corullón. An account of her patronage of the Isidorian temple detailed how she expanded the estate with the addition of cloisters, chapter house, and the bell tower called Torre del Gallo.

On 10 June 1140, Infanta Sancha donated the monastery of Santa María de Wamba, now disappeared, with all its lands, villas, churches, estates and possessions to the Order of St. John of Jerusalem, «pro redemptione omnium peccatorum meorum, pro salvatione anime mee, pro anima patris et matris mee et pro etiam anime domine Gelbire, mee amite». This donation was such that during the following years, the contacts between the infanta and the Knights of St. John were almost always associated with this grant. The lands and places donated to the Hospitallers had been part of an Infantazgo that had belonged to Sancha's father, Count Raymond of Burgundy. In 1148, she donated, to the same order, the Church of Santa Maria de Olmedo, and a year before, in 1147, founded the Monastery of Santa María de La Santa Espina, in the province of Valladolid, which foundation was confirmed by her brother King Alfonso a year later.

In 1148, assembled the cortes of the kingdom in the city of Palencia, Infanta-Queen Sancha persuaded her brother the emperor, the bishops and the magnates to have the Augustinian canons, who lived in the Monastery of Carbajal, transferred to the Collegiate Church of San Isidoro de León and, simultaneously, for the Benedictine nuns who had lived in San Isidoro de León for over two hundred years, to move to the Monastery of Carbajal, thereby fulfilling the wish of Saint Isidore of Seville, who had appeared to her in a vision and had ordered this move.

Records also show that she granted additional possessions to the archbishop of Compostelana, which included the monastery of Santiago and San Miguel de Escalada. In 1156 she donated to the Hospitallers, the town of San Juan de Arenas, in Siero, Asturias, provided they were not to dispose of it. In the same year, she granted to the canons of San Isidoro the privilege, signed by her brother the king, whereby all men who so wished could become vassals of the Monastery. They would be under its jurisdiction, take all their possessions with them and would henceforth be exempt from paying any taxes to the king. Her brother Alfonso VII died the following year, in 1157, and was succeeded on the throne of León by Ferdinand II and on the throne of Castile by Sancho III who only reigned for a year and succeeded by his only surviving son Alfonso VIII of Castile.

In her will, undated, among other provisions, she ordered that all the possessions that she had enjoyed during her lifetime which had belonged previously to the Monastery of San Julián and Santa Basilisa of Ruiforco and had been assigned to San Isidoro de León from the time of Alfonso V of León should be returned to San Isidoro. Pursuant to her will, the properties of the monastery of Ruiforco were assigned definitely to San Isidoro de León on 24 March 1159 by her nephew King Ferdinand II of León. In the charter, the monarch mentions that his aunt Sancha was buried there.

== Death and burial ==
She died on 28 February 1159 and was buried in the Pantheon of Kings in San Isidoro de León, where her mother, Queen Urraca had been interred. The remains of the Infanta Sancha were deposited in a stone tomb with the following epitaph in Latin:

Hesperiae speculum, decus orbis, gloria Regni, HIC REQUIESCIT REGINA DOMNA SANCIA, SOROR IMPERATORIS justitia culmen, et pietatis apex Santia pro ADEFONSI FILIA URRACHAE ET RAIMUNDI, HAEC STATUIT meritis inmensum nota per orbem, proh dolor¡ exiguo ORDINEM REGULARIUM CANONICORUM IN ECCLESIA ISTA, ET clauderis in tumulo, Sol bis sexcentos, QUIA DICEBAT BEATUM ISIDORUM SPONSUM SUUM, demtis tribus, egerat annes, cum pia subcubuit VIRGO OBIIT ERA M. C. LX VII PRID. KAL. MARTII finis erat Februarii.

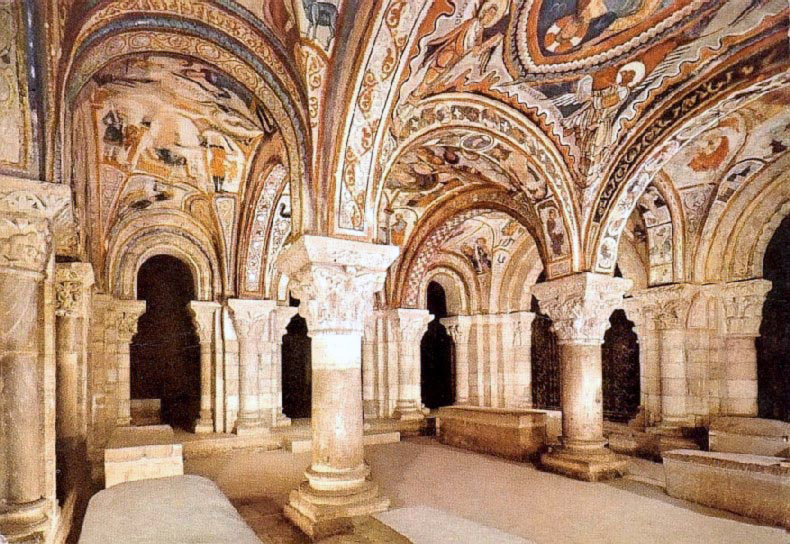
The Royal Pantheon.

During the War of Independence, the Pantheon of Kings in San Isidoro de León became a stable and the bodies buried there were removed from their graves by French soldiers and piled in a corner after being picked up by the canons of the collegiate and brought to the church of Santa Marina de León, except the Infanta Sancha, who because of the veneration that she professed, was picked apart and taken to the house of a resident of León, where she remained until the end of the war, which was returned to the church of San Isidoro in the presence of the authorities of the city, being placed the mummy in a tomb, but without cover, as the cover of the real tomb of the infanta appeared several years later halved.

In 1858, Queen Isabel II of Spain visited the Basilica of San Isidoro de Leon and the Infanta Sancha's mummy, which was naked. So when the Queen returned to Madrid, she sent a gold brocade robe for the mummy to wear, but the cloak disappeared during the ???Revolutionary Sexenio??? apparently stolen by the provincial governor, who loaned it so he could make a copy of it, so that his wife did a replica for her, and yet never returned.

During the study of the tombs of the Pantheon of Kings in San Isidoro de León, completed in 1997, it was determined that the body of the Infanta lay incorrupted, as did that of the Infante Ferdinand, son of Ferdinand II of León, who also lies buried there. Placed on the cushion where the head of the Infanta Sancha lay was found a letter, dated December 22, 1868, which explained: "In the year 1868, during the reign of Doña Isabel II, the Pantheon of the Kings was found in a completely abandoned state, and the body of the queen Doña Sancha, perfectly preserved in a state of mummification, was found completely nude. The Pantheon was restored by the effort of the governor of this province, D. Manuel Rodríguez Monje, and the body of the queen Doña Isabel II was dressed in linen donated for this purpose by his daughter Doña Carmen."

Nevertheless, various sources indicate that the Infanta Sancha was buried in the Cathedral of Zamora, while others say she was buried in the church of San Cosme and San Damián de Covarrubias. On the left wall of the chancel of the Cathedral Zamora is placed an epitaph, composed in 1620–1621 by Alonso de Remesal, in which it is stated that the Infanta Sancha was buried there:

HIC IACET ILLUSTRIS DOMINA SANCIA INFANTISSA SOROR ADEPHONSI IMPERATORIS

Moreover, in the Collegiate of Covarrubias is placed a stone tomb, dating from the fifteenth century, which is supposed to contain the remains of the Infanta Sancha, who granted Fueros to the town of Covarrubias in the year 1148. About the lid of the tomb attributed to the infant appears abbey and the cross carved on the front is placed quartered shield of Castile and León, which was awarded to the infanta Sancha by her brother the king.

In the Monastery of Santa Maria de La Santa Espina, located in the province of Valladolid, near the altarpiece, on the Gospel side, is placed a statue depicting praying the Infanta Sancha Raimúndez, made of alabaster, although the infant was not buried there.

== Legacy ==
The Infanta-Queen Sancha, like her brother Alfonso made large donations to the Basilica of San Isidoro de León where she resided before it was inhabited by Augustinian canons in 1148, and finished his day works undertaken in the new church of San Isidoro de León in times of Infanta Urraca of Zamora. The infanta, named "San Isidoro's wife" was full of praise even being in life and the Augustinian canons of San Isidoro Gonzalez saw his fundadora.

After her death, the institution of the Infantry declined and virtually disappeared as such, since it is no longer assets of the infantas who remained unmarried. Years after the death of Alfonso VII, King Alfonso VIII of Castile donated goods Castilian Infantado to different churches, as the Collegiate of Covarrubias or the Monasterio de las Huelgas de Burgos, while in the kingdom of León, his uncle Fernando II donated his sister Sancha of Castile, Queen of Navarre, all of the Leonese Infantado.

== Bibliography ==
- Arco y Garay, Ricardo del (1954). Sepulcros de la Casa Real de Castilla. Madrid: Instituto Jerónimo Zurita. Consejo Superior de Investigaciones Científicas. OCLC 11366237.
- Barquero Goñi, Carlos (1994). "Los hospitalarios y la nobleza castellano-leonesa (s. XII-XIII)". Historia, instituciones, documentos (in Spanish). No. 21. Sevilla: Universidad de Sevilla: Departamento de Historia Medieval y Ciencias y Técnicas Historiográficas. pp. 13–40. ISSN 0210-7716.
- Barton, Simon (1992). "Two Catalan magnates in the courts of the kings of León-Castile: the careers of Ponce de Cabrera and Ponce de Minerva re-examined". Journal of Medieval History. No. 18. pp. 233–266. doi:10.1016/0304-4181(92)90022-Q.
- García Calles, Luisa (1972). Doña Sancha, hermana del Emperador (in Spanish). Colección:Anejos del Anuario de Estudios Medievales. León: Centro de Estudios e Investigación "San Isidoro". CSIC. OCLC 878496.
- García Esteban, Emiliano; Alonso Cuevas, Santiago (1998). Covarrubias (in Spanish). Burgos: Editur. ISBN 84-923-8050-0.
- García Martínez, Aída (2005). "Aproximación crítica a la historiografía de San Isidoro de León" (PDF). Estudios humanísticos. Historia (in Spanish). No. 4. León: Universidad de León. Servicio de Publicaciones. pp. 53–94. ISSN 1696-0300.
- González Flórez, Maximiliano (1981). "El Infantado de Torío". Tierras de León: Revista de la Diputación Provincial (in Spanish). No. 45. León: Diputación de León. pp. 35–60. ISSN 0495-5773.
- Martin, Georges (2008a). "Le testament d'Elvire (Tábara, 1099)". e-Spania, revue interdisciplinaire d'études hispaniques médiévales et modernes (in French). doi:10.4000/e-spania.12303.
- Martin, Therese (2008b). "Hacia una clarificación del infantazgo en tiempos de la reina Urraca y su hija la infanta Sancha (ca. 1107-1159)". E-Spania: Revue électronique d'études hispaniques médiévales (in Spanish). No. 5. París: Université Paris-Sorbonne (Paris IV). ISSN 1951-6169.
- Pérez, Joseph; Escalona, Romualdo (1782). Historia del Real Monasterio de Sahagún (in Spanish). Madrid: Joachin Ibarra, Impresor de Cámara de S. M.
- Pérez González, Maurilio (1997). Crónica del Emperador Alfonso VII (in Spanish). León: Universidad de León, Secretariado de Publicaciones. ISBN 84-7719-601-X.
- Pérez Llamazares, Julio (1953). "Panteones Reales Leoneses". Hidalguía: la revista de genealogía, nobleza y armas (in Spanish). No. 2. Madrid.
- Prada Marcos, María Encina (1998). Estudio antropológico del Panteón Real de San Isidoro de León (PDF) (in Spanish). ProMonumenta (II).
- Rivera de las Heras, José Ángel (2001). La Catedral de Zamora (in Spanish). Durius Cultural. ISBN 84-931293-1-3. OCLC 434239612.
- Viñayo González, Antonio (1998). Real Colegiata de San Isidoro: Historia, Arte y Vida (in Spanish). León: Edilesa. ISBN 84-8012-201-3.
