= Berengaria of Castile =

Queen of Castile and Toledo in 1217

Berengaria
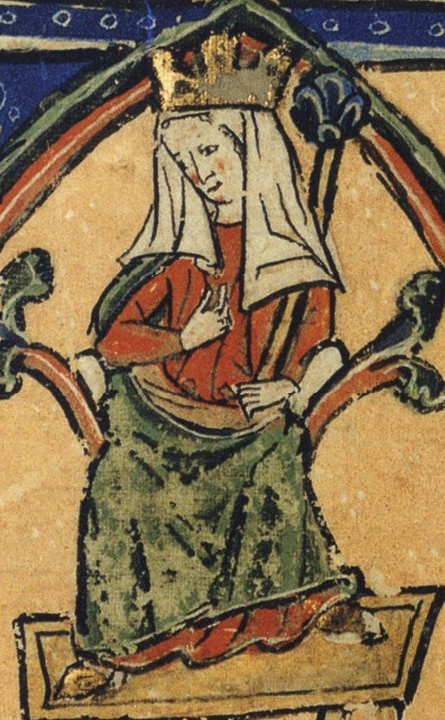
- Detail of the 13th-century cartulary of the Toxos Outos Monastery

Queen of Castile and Toledo
- Reign: 6 June 1217 – 31 August 1217 or 8 November 1246
- Predecessor: Henry I
- Successor: Ferdinand III
- Co-ruler: Ferdinand III (1217–1246)

Queen consort of León
- Tenure: 1197–1204
- Born: 1179 or 1180; Burgos
- Died: 8 November 1246 (aged 66); Las Huelgas near Burgos
- Burial: Las Huelgas near Burgos
- Spouses: Conrad II, Duke of Swabia (m. 1187; died 1196) Alfonso IX of León (m. 1197; ann. 1204)
- Issue more...: Ferdinand III, King of Castile; Alfonso, Lord of Molina; Berengaria, Latin Empress
- House: Castilian House of Ivrea
- Father: Alfonso VIII of Castile
- Mother: Eleanor of England

Berengaria (Castilian: Berenguela), nicknamed the Great (Castilian: la Grande) (1179 or 1180 – 8 November 1246), was the queen of Castile who ascended the throne in 1217, and previously queen of León from 1197 to 1204 as the second wife of King Alfonso IX. As the eldest child and heir presumptive of Alfonso VIII of Castile, she was a sought-after bride, and was engaged to Conrad, the son of Holy Roman Emperor Frederick I. After Conrad's death, she married her cousin Alfonso IX of León to secure the peace between him and her father. She had five children with him before their marriage was voided by Pope Innocent III.

When her father died, Berengaria served as regent for her younger brother Henry I in Castile until she succeeded him on his untimely death. Within months, she had her son Ferdinand III acclaimed king. She continued guiding policy, negotiating, and ruling for the rest of her life. She was responsible for the re-unification of Castile and León under her son's authority, and supported his efforts in the Reconquista. She was a patron of religious institutions and supported the writing of a history of the two countries.

== Early life ==
Berengaria was born either in 1179 or 1180, in Burgos. She was the eldest daughter of King Alfonso VIII of Castile and his wife, Eleanor of England. She was the elder sister of Henry I of Castile and was named in honor of Alfonso VIII's grandmother Berengaria of Barcelona. Those who cared for the young infanta were generously rewarded. Her nurse Estefanía received land from Alfonso and Eleanor on her retirement in May 1181. Another nurse, Elvira, received a similar retirement gift in 1189 at Berengaria's request.

As the eldest child of King Alfonso and Queen Eleanor, who preferred to give birth to a son and therefore later king, Berengaria was the heir presumptive to the throne of Castile for several years because many of the children born later to the couple died shortly after birth or in early infancy. She became a greatly-desired bride throughout Europe.

Berengaria's first engagement was agreed in 1187 when her hand was sought by Conrad, the fifth child of Holy Roman Emperor Frederick I Barbarossa. The next year, the marriage contract was signed in Seligenstadt, including a dowry of 42000 Maravedí. Conrad then marched to Castile, where in Carrión the engagement was celebrated and Conrad was knighted making him a servant of his new lord, Alfonso. Berengaria's claim to the throne was based in part on documentation in the treaty and marriage contract, which specified that she would inherit the kingdom after her father or any childless brothers who might come along. Conrad would only be allowed to co-rule as her spouse, and Castile would not become part of the Empire. Furthermore, he was not allowed to claim the throne for himself in case of Alfonso's death, but was obliged to defend and protect the kingdom until Berengaria arrived. The treaty also documented traditional rights and obligations between the future sovereign and the nobility.

The marriage was not consummated because Berengaria was less than 10 years old. Conrad and Berengaria never saw each other again. By 1191, Berengaria requested an annulment of the engagement from the pope, influenced, no doubt, by third parties such as her grandmother Duchess Eleanor of Aquitaine, who was not interested in having a Hohenstaufen as a neighbor to her French fiefdoms. Those fears were neutralized when Conrad was assassinated in 1196.

== Queen consort of León ==
In order to help secure peace between Castile and León and by becoming a mediator between her father and her husband, Berengaria married King Alfonso IX of León, her first cousin once removed, in Valladolid in 1197. As part of the marriage, and in accordance with Spanish customs of the time, she received direct control over a number of castles and lands within León. Most of these were along the border with Castile, and the nobles who ran them in her name were allowed to seek justice from either king in the event of being wronged by the other. In turn, these knights were charged with maintaining the peace along the border in the queen's name.

Starting in 1198, Pope Innocent III objected to the marriage on the grounds of consanguinity and even threatened to excommunicate Alfonso, though the couple stayed together until 1204. They vehemently sought a dispensation in order to stay together, including offering large sums of money. The pope denied their request, but they succeeded in establishing the legitimacy of their children. The marriage was dissolved in 1204. Berengaria returned to her parents in Castile in May, where she dedicated herself to the care of her children. The eldest of them, Eleanor (1198/99–1202), had died; Constance (1200–1242), Ferdinand (1201–1252), Alfonso (1203–1272), and Berengaria (1204–1237) survived infancy.

== Between queenships ==
Though she had left her role as queen of León, Berengaria retained authority over and taxing rights in many of the lands she had received there, including Salamanca and Castroverde, which she gave to her son Ferdinand in 1206. Some of the nobles who had served her as queen followed her back to the court in Castile. The peace which had prevailed since her marriage was lost, and there was war again between León and Castile, in part over her control of these lands. In 1205, 1207, and 1209, treaties were made again between the two countries, each expanding her control. In the treaties of 1207 and 1209, Berengaria and her son were given again significant properties along the border, including many key castles, including Villalpando. The treaty in 1207 is the first existing public document in the Castilian dialect.

In 1214, on the death of her father, Alfonso VIII, the Castilian crown passed to his only surviving son, Berengaria's 10-year-old brother, Henry I. Their mother Eleanor assumed the regency, but died 24 days after her husband. Berengaria, now heir presumptive again, replaced her as regent. At this point internal strife began, instigated by the nobility, primarily the House of Lara. They forced Berengaria to cede regency and guardianship of her brother to Count Álvaro Núñez de Lara.

In 1216, an extraordinary parliamentary session was held in Valladolid, attended by such Castilian magnates as Lope Díaz II de Haro, Gonzalo Rodríguez Girón, Álvaro Díaz de Cameros, Alfonso Téllez de Meneses and others, who agreed, with the support of Berengaria, to make common cause against Álvaro Núñez de Lara. At the end of May the situation in Castile had grown perilous for Berengaria, so she decided to take refuge in the castle of Autillo de Campos, which was held by Gonzalo Rodríguez Girón (one of her allies) and sent her son Ferdinand to the court of his father. On 15 August 1216, an assembly of all the magnates of Castile was held to attempt to reach an accord that would prevent civil war, but disagreements led the families of Girón, Téllez de Meneses, and Haro to break definitively with Álvaro de Lara.

== Queen of Castile ==
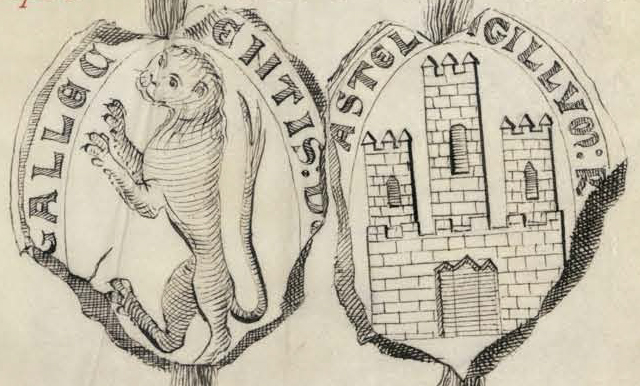
Seal of Berengaria

Circumstances changed suddenly when Henry died on 6 June 1217 after receiving a head wound from a tile which came loose while he was playing with other children at the palace of the bishop of Palencia. His guardian, Count Álvaro Núñez de Lara, tried to hide the fact, taking the king's body to the castle of Tariego, although it was inevitable that the news would reach Berengaria.

Berengaria was aware that her former husband might claim the Kingdom of Castile for himself. Therefore, she kept her brother's death secret from Alfonso. She wrote to Alfonso asking that their son Ferdinand be sent to visit her, and then declared Ferdinand king on 31 August. Her elevation of Ferdinand to kingship has been considered her abdication, but her biographer Miriam Shadis argues that Berengaria did not see it like that and notes that Berengaria continued to rule. On the other hand, according to Georges Martin, she abdicated to her son in 1217 and thereafter remained a politically influential queen mother. Robert Bartlett mentioned both the view that she was merely a sovereign for a short time in 1217 and the view that she continued as a co-ruler with her son thereafter.

After Ferdinand's acclamation, Berengaria continued to intervene in state policy, albeit in an indirect manner. Well into her son's reign, contemporary authors wrote that she still wielded authority over him. One example was how she arranged the marriage of her son with Elizabeth (Beatrice), daughter of Duke Philip of Swabia and granddaughter of two emperors: Frederick Barbarossa and Isaac II Angelos of Byzantium. The wedding took place on 30 November 1219 at Burgos. Another instance in which Berengaria's mediation stood out developed in 1218 when the scheming Lara family, still headed by former regent Álvaro Núñez de Lara, conspired to have Alfonso IX, King of León and King Ferdinand's father, invade Castile to seize his son's throne. However, the capture of Count Lara facilitated the intervention of Berengaria, who got father and son to sign the Pact of Toro on 26 August 1218, putting an end to confrontations between Castile and León.

In 1222, Berengaria achieved the ratification of the Convention of Zafra, thereby making peace with the Laras by arranging the marriage of Mafalda, daughter and heir of the Lord of Molina, Gonzalo Pérez de Lara, to her own son and King Ferdinand's brother, Alfonso. In 1224 she arranged the marriage of her daughter Berengaria to John of Brienne, a maneuver which brought Ferdinand III closer to the throne of León, since John was the candidate Alfonso IX had in mind to marry his eldest daughter Sancha. By proceeding more quickly, Berengaria prevented the daughters of her former husband from marrying a man who could claim the throne of León.

Perhaps Berengaria's most decisive action took place in 1230, when Alfonso IX died having designated as heirs to the throne his daughters Sancha and Dulce from his first marriage to Theresa of Portugal, superseding the rights of Ferdinand III. Berengaria met with the princesses' mother and succeeded in the ratification of the Treaty of Las Tercerías, by which they renounced the throne in favor of their half-brother in exchange for a substantial sum of money and other benefits. Thus were the thrones of León and Castile re-united in the person of Ferdinand III, which had been divided by Alfonso VII in 1157. She intervened again by arranging the second marriage of Ferdinand after the death of Elisabeth of Hohenstaufen. Although he already had several children, Berengaria was concerned that the king's virtue not be diminished with illicit relations. This time, she chose a French noblewoman, Joan of Dammartin, a candidate put forth by the king's aunt and Berengaria's sister Blanche, widow of King Louis VIII of France. Berengaria ruled alone while her son Ferdinand was in the south on his long campaigns of the Reconquista. She governed Castile and León with her characteristic skill, relieving him of the need to divide his attention during this time.

== Patronage and legacy ==
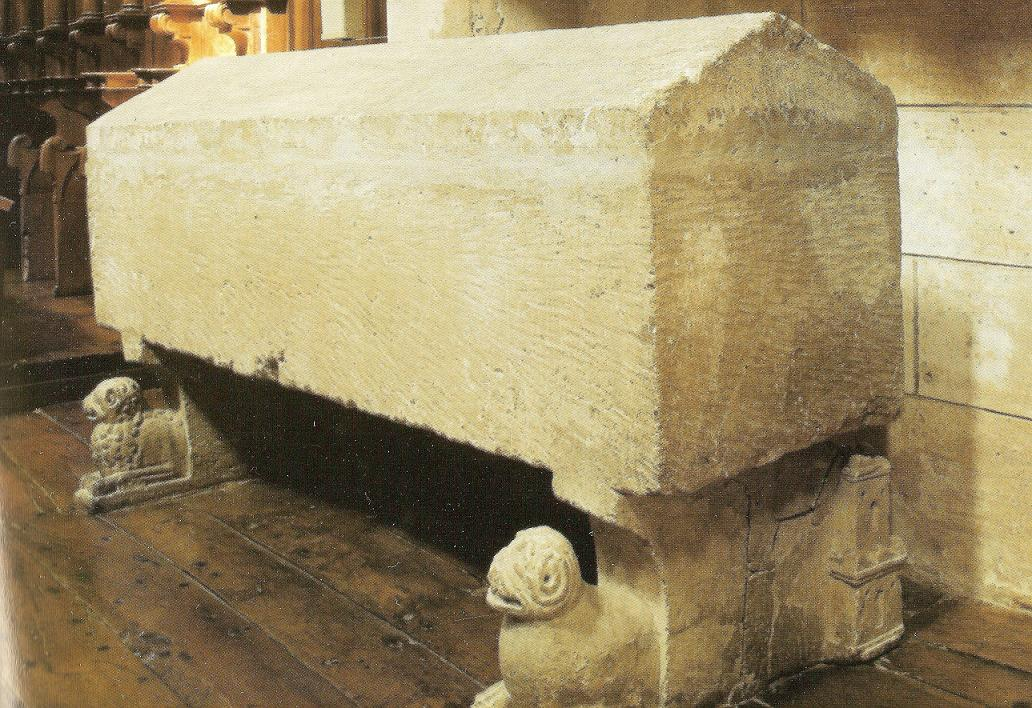
Berengaria's tomb in Las Huelgas

Berengaria met with her son a final time in Pozuelo de Calatrava in 1245, afterwards returning to Toledo. She died on 8 November 1246 and was buried at Las Huelgas near Burgos.

Much like her mother, Berengaria was a strong patron of religious institutions. She worked with her mother to support the Abbey of Santa María la Real de Las Huelgas. As queen of León, she supported the Order of Santiago and supported the Basilica of San Isidoro, not only donating to it, but also exempting it from any taxes. She re-established the tradition of Leónese royal women supporting the Monastery of San Pedro de Eslonza, last performed by her great-grand-aunt, Sancha Raimúndez.

Berengaria is portrayed as a wise and virtuous woman by the chroniclers of the time. She was also concerned with literature and history, charging Lucas de Tuy to compose a chronicle on the kings of Castile and León to aid and instruct future rulers of the joint kingdom. She herself was discussed in the works of Rodrigo Jiménez de Rada, whose work was sponsored by her son Ferdinand, and Juan of Osma, who was chancellor of Castile under Ferdinand.

== Commemoration ==
The Spanish Navy screw frigate Berenguela, in commission from 1857 to 1877, was named for Berengaria of Castile.

== Notes ==
Berengaria of Castile Castilian House of Ivrea Cadet branch of the House of Ivrea Born: 1 January/June 1180 Died: 8 November 1246
Regnal titles
Preceded by Henry I	Queen regnant of Castile; 1217–1217/46	Succeeded by Ferdinand III
Spanish royalty
Vacant Title last held by Theresa of Portugal	Queen consort of León; 1197–1204	Vacant Title next held by Elisabeth of Hohenstaufen
