= Raymond of Burgundy =

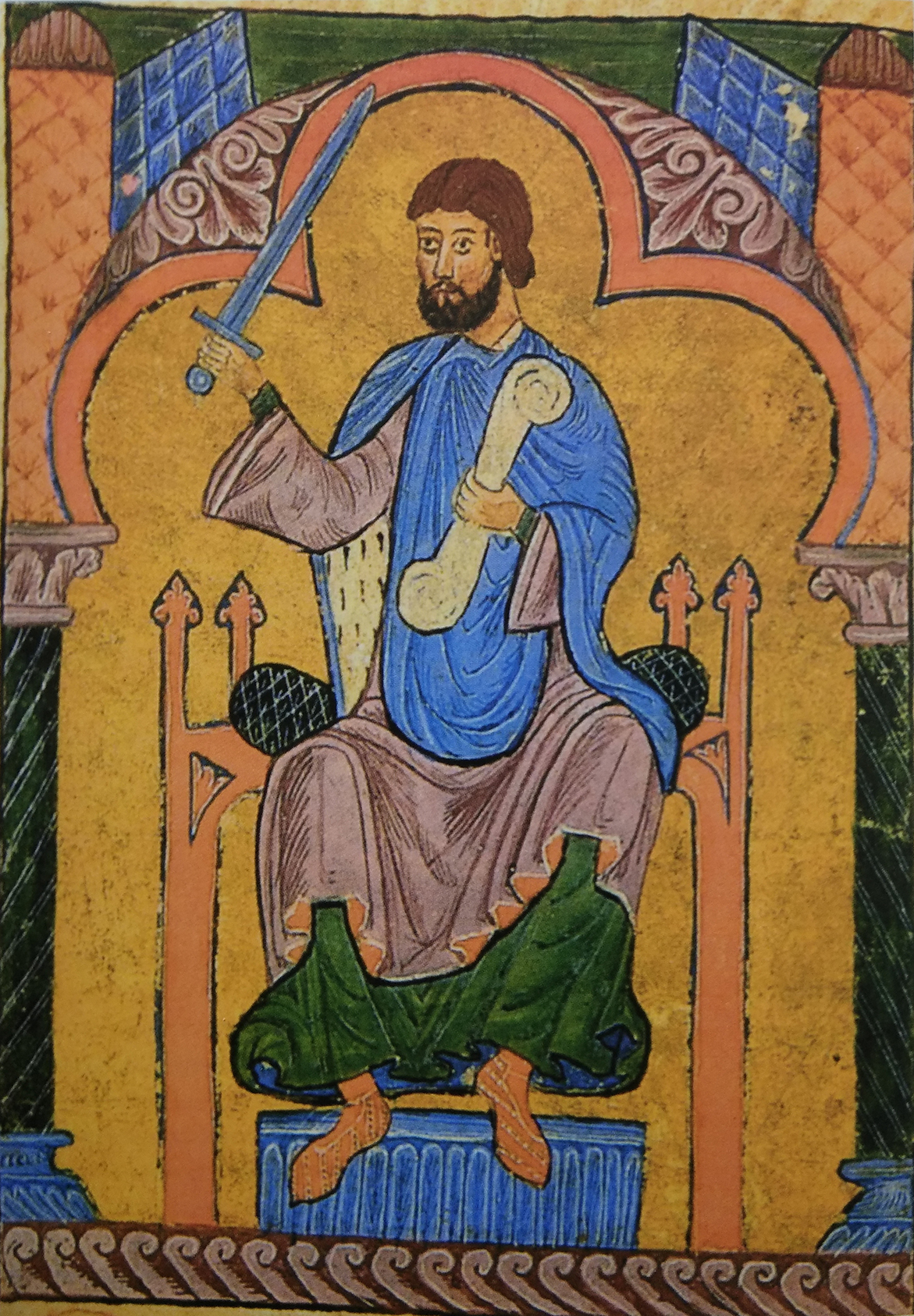
- Raymond in a miniature of the Tumbo A cartulary in the cathedral of Santiago de Compostela, the chief bishopric of his dominion.

Count of Galicia
- Reign: 1093–1096
- Predecessor: Nuno Mendes
- Successor: Henry
- Born: 1070; Besançon, County of Burgundy
- Died: 24 May 1107 (aged 36–37); Grajal de Campos
- Burial: Cathedral of Santiago de Compostela
- Spouse: Urraca of León and Castile
- Issue: Sancha Raimúndez; Alfonso VII of León and Castile
- House: Ivrea
- Father: William I, Count of Burgundy
- Mother: Stephanie
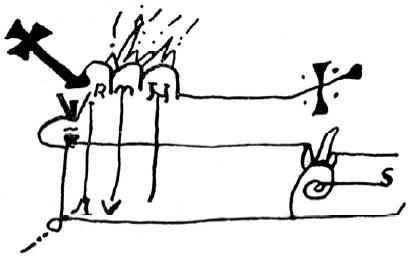
- Signature

Raymond of Burgundy (c. 1070 – 24 May 1107) was the ruler of Galicia as vassal of Alfonso VI of León and Castile, the Emperor of All Spain, from about 1090 until his death. He was the fourth son of Count William I of Burgundy and Stephanie. He married Urraca, future queen of León and heir of Alfonso VI, and was the father of the future Alfonso VII.

When Raymond and his cousin, Henry of Burgundy, first arrived in Iberia is uncertain, but it probably was with the army of Duke Odo I of Burgundy in 1086. In April 1087, the army abandoned the siege of Tudela. While most of the army returned home, Odo and his retinue went west. By 21 July 1087 they were probably at Burgos, at the court of Alfonso VI, and by 5 August he was in the capital city of León. There Odo most likely arranged Raymond's marriage to Alfonso's heiress, Urraca. All surviving charters which seem to place Raymond in Spain before 1087 are either mis-dated or interpolated.

By his marriage Raymond received as dowry the government of the Kingdom of Galicia (which included the County of Portugal and the County of Coimbra), although shortly after, in 1095, Alfonso VI gave the County of Portugal and the County of Coimbra to Henry of Burgundy, father of the first Portuguese King Afonso Henriques of Portugal, basing it in Bracara Augusta (nowadays Braga). During his government he was titled Count, Dominus, Prince, Emperor and Consul of Galicia or of the Galicians, exercising near absolute power in his domains ("in urbe Gallecia regnante Comite Raymundus"): "serenissimus totius Gallecie comes", "totius Gallecie Senior et Dominus", "totius Gallecie Consul", "totius Gallecie Princeps", "totius Gallecie Imperator".

He was father of Alfonso VII of León and Castile (1104/1105–1157), already crowned king of Galicia in 1111, while his brother later became Pope Callixtus II.

== Sources ==
- Barón Faraldo, Andrés (2011). "Magnates y nobiles en la curia del conde Raimundo de Borgoña, Totius Gallecie Princeps (c. 1091–1107)" (PDF). Estudios Mindonienses. 27: 531–74. Archived from the original (PDF) on 8 August 2014.
- David, Pierre (1948). "La pacte succesoral entre Raymond de Galice et Henri de Portugal". Bulletin Hispanique. 50 (3): 275–90. doi:10.3406/hispa.1948.3146.
- Fletcher, Richard A. (1984). Saint James's Catapult: The Life and Times of Diego Gelmírez of Santiago de Compostela. Oxford: Oxford University Press.
- Martínez Díez, Gonzalo (2003). Alfonso VI: señor del Cid, conquistador de Toledo. Madrid: Temas de Hoy.
- Reilly, Bernard F. (1968). "Santiago and Saint Denis: The French Presence in Eleventh-Century Spain". The Catholic Historical Review. 54 (3): 467–83.
- Reilly, Bernard F. (1982). The Kingdom of León-Castilla under Queen Urraca, 1109–1126. Princeton: Princeton University Press.
- Reilly, Bernard F. (1989). The Kingdom of León-Castilla under King Alfonso VI, 1065–1109. Princeton: Princeton University Press.
- Reilly, Bernard F. (1998). The Kingdom of León-Castilla Under King Alfonso VII, 1126–1157. Philadelphia: University of Pennsylvania Press.
- Serrano, Luciano (1907). Fuentes para la historia de Castilla por los padres benedictinos de Silos, Tomo II: Cartulario del Infantado de Covarrubias.
- Slaughter, John E. (1983). "Sobre la fecha de la muerte del conde Raimundo de Galicia". Anuario de Estudios Medievales. 13: 93–114.
