= Theresa of Portugal, Queen of León =

Queen of León from 1191 to 1195

Saint Theresa of Portugal
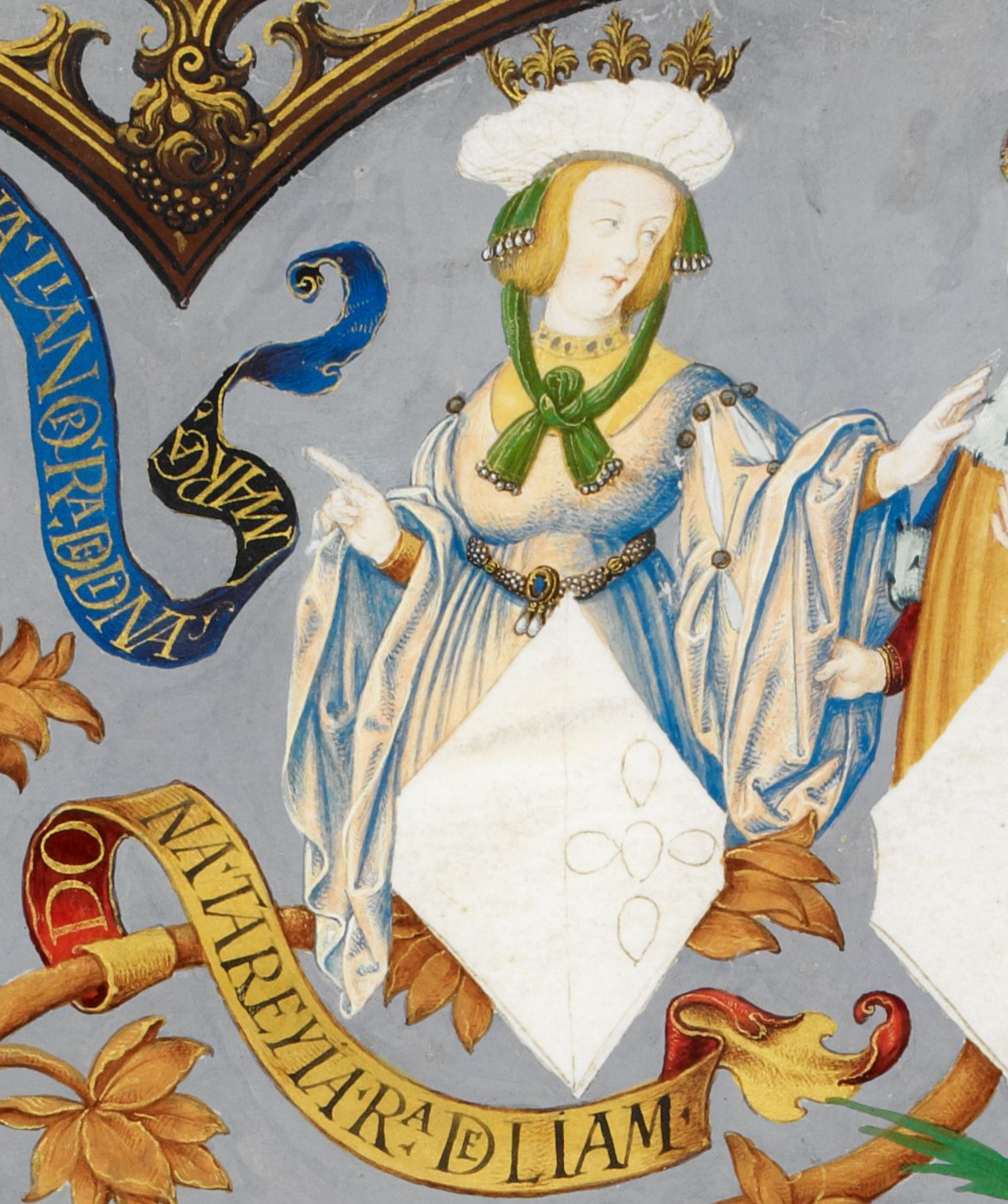

Queen consort of León
- Tenure: 1191–1195
- Born: 1176; Kingdom of Portugal
- Died: 18 June 1250 (aged 73–74); Lorvão Abbey, Kingdom of Portugal
- Burial: Lorvão Abbey, Portugal
- Spouse: Alfonso IX of León (m. 1191; ann. 1196)
- Issue: Sancha; Dulce; Ferdinand
- House: House of Burgundy
- Father: Sancho I of Portugal
- Mother: Dulce of Aragon

Theresa of Portugal (1176 – 18 June 1250) was Queen of Léon as the first wife of her first cousin King Alfonso IX of León. When her marriage was annulled because of consanguinity, she retired to a convent. She was beatified in 1705.

She was born the oldest daughter of Sancho I of Portugal and Dulce of Aragon.

Theresa was the mother to three of Alfonso's children—two daughters, Sancha and Dulce, and a son, Ferdinand, who was the heir of the kingdom until his death in 1214. However, when her marriage to Alfonso was declared invalid because they were first cousins, she returned to the Kingdom of Portugal and lived in the Monastery of Lorvão, formerly under the Benedictine rule, which she converted into a Cistercian convent, with over 300 nuns.

In 1230, Alfonso died after having several children with a second wife, Queen Berengaria of Castile. This second marriage was also annulled because Berengaria was Alfonso's first cousin once removed. With two invalidated marriages, there was dispute among the children as to who would inherit the throne. Theresa negotiated the Treaty of Benavente by which Sancha and Dulce stepped aside and allowed Ferdinand III of Castile, Berengaria's eldest son, to take the throne of León. After the succession dispute, Theresa returned to Lorvão and finally took her convent vows after years of living as a nun. She died in the convent on 18 June 1250, of natural causes.

On 13 December 1705 Theresa was beatified by Pope Clement XI's papal bull Sollicitudo Pastoralis Offici, along with her sister Sancha. Her feast day was originally 17 June but since 1962 has been observed concurrent with that of her two sisters Sancha and Mafalda on 20 June.

Preceded by Urraca López de Haro	Queen consort of León; 1191–1194	Succeeded by Berenguela of Castile
