= Corullón =

Corullón, Spain
- Coat of arms

- Location within Spain
- Coordinates: 42°34′49″N 6°48′46″W
- Country: Spain
- Autonomous community: Castile and León
- Province: León
- Comarca: El Bierzo
- Municipality: Corullón

Government
  - Mayor: Luis Alberto Cobo Vidal (PSOE)

Area
  - Total: 83.04 km^{2} (32.06 sq mi)
- Elevation: 522 m (1,713 ft)

Population (2025-01-01)
  - Total: 789
  - Density: 9.50/km^{2} (24.6/sq mi)
- Time zone: UTC+1 (CET)
  - Summer (DST): UTC+2 (CEST)
- Postal Code: 24514
- Telephone prefix: 987
- Climate: Csb
- Website: Ayto. de Corullón

Corullón (Spanish pronunciation: [koɾuˈʎon]) is a village and municipality located in the region of El Bierzo (the province of León, Castile and León, Spain) . According to the 2010 census (INE), the municipality has a population of 1,122 inhabitants.
