= Ferdinand of León (died 1214) =

Heir apparent of Alfonso IX of León

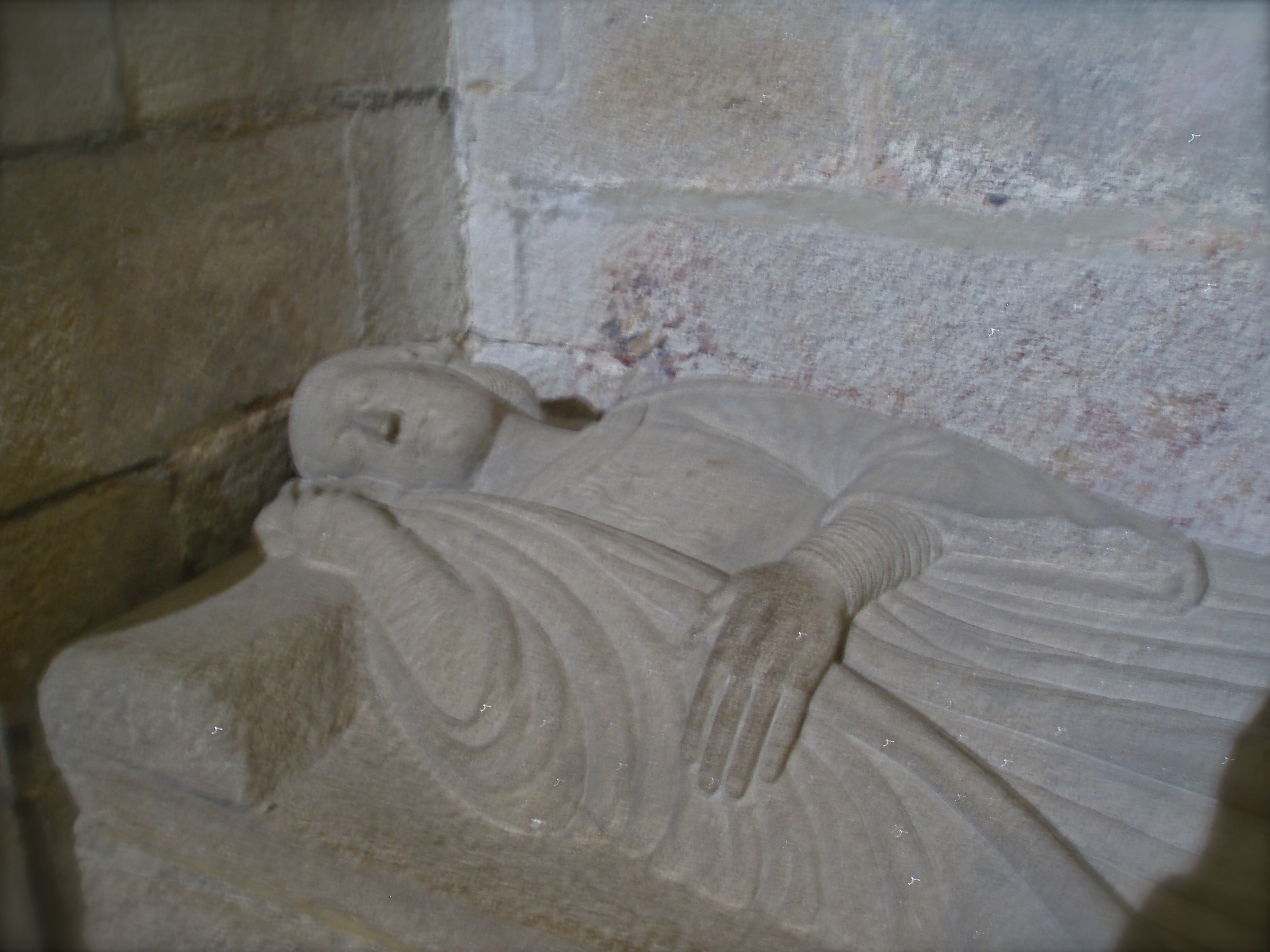
Tomb of Ferdinand of Galicia and Léon in the Royal Pantheon of Santiago de Compostela Cathedral

Ferdinand (c. 1192 – August 1214) was the eldest son and heir apparent of Alfonso IX of León by his first wife, Theresa, daughter of Sancho I of Portugal. He predeceased his father, unmarried and without issue at the age of about 22. According to the historian Lucas of Tuy, who called Ferdinand "an extremely handsome youth" (pulcherrimus adolescens), the "king of León grieved profoundly for his death" and had him buried in the cathedral of Santiago de Compostela, where his grandfather and namesake, Ferdinand II, was buried. The new heir apparent then became another Ferdinand, Alfonso's first son by his second wife, Berengaria of Castile.

In 1196, Theresa and Alfonso's marriage was annulled and she and Ferdinand went to live at the court of her father in Portugal. After the death of Sancho in March 1211, Theresa came to an agreement with Alfonso IX and returned to León. With her former husband's assistance she hoped to secure the wealth of properties that had been left to her in her father's will against the claims of the Portuguese crown. As a result of this agreement, Alfonso broke off his alliance with Castile. From 21 April 1211, Ferdinand, whose legitimacy was suspect on account of his parents' annulment, was the heir apparent to the throne of León. He co-signed charters with his father and was referred to as "infante Fernando, the king's firstborn son". The title infante was granted to royal sons and infanta to daughters.

In November 1212 Alfonso IX signed the Treaty of Coimbra with Alfonso VIII of Castile (the father of his second wife) and Alfonso II of Portugal (the brother of his first wife). Although the treaty weakened the Castilian defences on the border by forcing them to hand over four castles to the Leonese to be demolished, it probably also strengthened the position of Alfonso VIII's grandson against the eldest son Ferdinand in a possible future succession crisis. Ferdinand was a co-signatory with his father in several acts before April that year, when the two kingdoms made peace in preparation for a great battle against the Muslims. He did not sign any further charters during the period of peace, but on 22 April 1213, Ferdinand again co-signed a charter with his father.

== Bibliography ==
- Bianchini, Janna (2012). The Queen's Hand: Power and Authority in the Reign of Berenguela of Castile. Philadelphia: University of Pennsylvania Press. ISBN 978-0-8122-4433-5. JSTOR j.ctt3fhwc2.
