= Urraca of León and Castile =

Queen of León, Castile, and Galicia from 1109 to 1126

Urraca
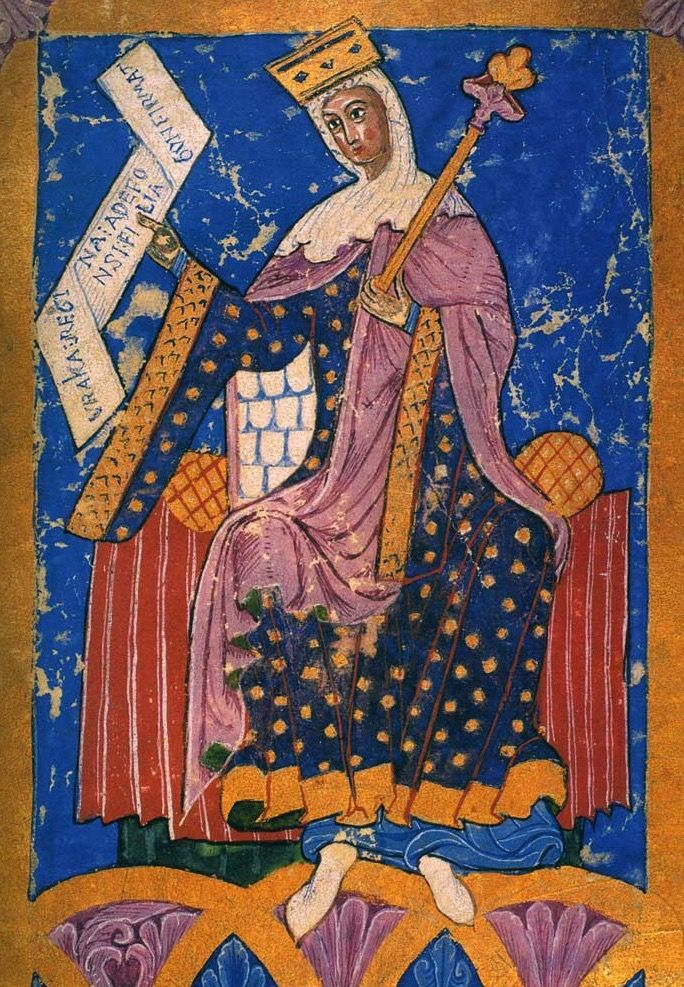
- 13th-century miniature of Queen Urraca presiding at Court from Tumbo A codex Santiago de Compostela Cathedral.

Queen of León and Castile
- Reign: 1109 – 1126
- Predecessor: Alfonso VI
- Successor: Alfonso VII

Queen of Galicia
- Reign: 1109 – 1111
- Predecessor: Alfonso VI
- Successor: Alfonso VII

Empress of All Spain
- Reign: 1109–1126
- Predecessor: Alfonso VI
- Successor: Alfonso VII
- Co-monarch: Alfonso the Battler

Queen consort of Aragon and Navarre
- Tenure: 1109 – 1114
- Born: 1081; León
- Died: 8 March 1126 (aged 44); Saldaña on the Río Carrión in Castilla
- Burial: St. Isidore's Basilica, León
- Spouse: Raymond of Burgundy; Alfonso the Battler
- Issue: Sancha Raimúndez; Alfonso VII of León and Castile; Fernando Pérez Furtado; Elvira Pérez de Lara
- House: Jiménez
- Father: Alfonso VI of León and Castile
- Mother: Constance of Burgundy

Urraca (León, 1081 – Saldaña, 8 March 1126), called the Reckless (La Temeraria), was Queen of León, Castile and Galicia from 1109 until her death. She claimed the imperial title as suo jure Empress of All Spain and Empress of All Galicia. She is considered to be the first independent western european queen to reign in her own right after the Byzantine Empresses of the east.

== Early years ==
Urraca was born to King Alfonso VI of León and Castile and his second wife, Constance of Burgundy. Constance was closely related to the French royal family and the influential Burgundian abbot Hugh of Cluny was her maternal uncle. As Constance was also related to her husband's first wife, Agnes of Aquitaine, Pope Gregory VII only confirmed their marriage after Alfonso agreed to replace the traditional Mozarabic liturgy in his realms with the Roman Rite. The place and date of Urraca's birth are unknown, but she was born likely in Sahagún or León around 1080, probably in 1081. Although she was her parents' sole child, her childhood is poorly documented. She mentioned Presbyter Pedro and Domingo Falcóniz, two otherwise unknown clergymen, as her tutors in her royal diplomas. Her relationship with her paternal aunt Elvira was obviously close, as it is demonstrated by Elvira's appointment as guardian of Urraca's daughter Sancha Raimúndez. A late source, Rodrigo Jiménez de Rada, claims that the powerful aristocrat Pedro Ansúrez and his wife Elo Alfónsez raised Urraca in their household, but no contemporaneous document confirms this report.

== First marriage and widowhood ==
Urraca was married to Raymond of Burgundy. Unlike her mother, who was a member of the ruling house of the Duchy of Burgundy, her husband descended from the rulers of the neighbouring County of Burgundy. Raymond was also the brother-in-law of Urraca's maternal cousin Duke Odo I of Burgundy and Odo's brother Henry. The Muslim Almoravids inflicted a heavy defeat on Alfonso VI at Sagrajas in 1086 and Urraca's marriage to Raymond was part of Alfonso's diplomatic strategy to attract cross-Pyrenees alliances. The first authentic document mentioning Urraca as Raymond's wife, a letter of grant to one Hermenegildo Rodríguez, was issued on 22 February 1093, but interpolated documents refer to them as husband and wife already before 1088. Historians Ángel Gordo Molina and Diego Melo Carrasco propose that Raymond wed Urraca likely before early 1090 when royal diplomas first present them as rulers of the "Land of Saint James", or Galicia.

Raymond reached the age of majority by the time of the marriage, but Alfonso VI continued to control the administration of Galicia. His representative in Galicia, Pedro Vimaraz, died around the time of the wedding and Alfonso appointed Arias Diaz as his successor. A talented young clergyman, Diego Gelmírez, was made the "chancellor and secretary" of Raymond and Urraca with Alfonso's consent. On the other hand, Raymond and Urraca became involved in the administration of other provinces as well. For instance, they witnessed charters on the occasion of the repopulation of Ávila, Segovia, Salamanca and Zamora. In 1093 Urraca's mother died and Alfonso's Moorish concubine Zaida of Seville gave birth to a son, Sancho Alfónsez. The birth of her illegitimate brother jeopardized Urraca's position as their father's sole heir. The power base of Raymond and Urraca weakened even more when Alfonso granted the "Land of Portugal" to his illegitimate daughter Theresa and her husband Henry of Burgundy around 1094.

As a woman, Urraca was under the tutelage of her husband. Raymond was mentioned at the first place in almost all documents issued during his rule as Count of Galicia. Two documents, both confirming privileges of the burghers of Santiago de Compostela, referred to her as "Queen Urraca" in 1095 and 1105. The use of the title may have expressed her resentment at her inferior position, although infantas, or royal princesses, were occasionally styled queens in this period. Sancho Alfónsez was regularly mentioned in royal diplomas from 1103, showing that Alfonso VI regarded his only son as his heir, although most clerics opposed the succession of an illegitimate child. By March 1107, Sancho was elected king on his father's initiative. Raymond made preparations for a succession crisis through an alliance with their brother-in-law Henry of Portugal. Their treaty was confirmed in the presence of a high-ranking monk from the Abbey of Cluny late in 1105 or early in 1106. They agreed on the division of their father-in-law's realms without referring to Sancho's claims and Henry promised to rule his portion as Raymond's vassal.

Raymond fell seriously ill and died in Grajal de Campos in September 1107. The widowed Urraca took full responsibility of the administration of Galicia. She styled herself "empress of whole Galicia" in her letter of grant to the Lugo Cathedral late in 1107 or early in 1108. The Galician clerics and aristocrats regarded Urraca's infant son by Raymond, Alfonso Raimúndez, as Raymond's lawful successor. The boy's position as his father's heir was confirmed in their presence at an assembly in León by Alfonso VI. The King also acknowledged his grandson's right to rule Galicia in case of Urraca's remarriage. Around this time Urraca began a love affair with the Castilian aristocrat Gómez González. Sancho Alfónsez died fighting against the Almoravids at Uclés on 29 May 1108. After her half-brother's unexpected death, Urraca became their father's sole heir. Her new position was ceremoniously confirmed at an assembly of "almost all nobles and counts of Spain" shortly before her father died on 30 June or 1 July 1109.

== Reign ==
=== Second marriage ===
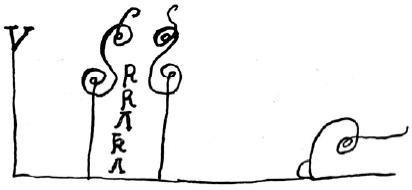
Signature of Urraca from 1097 charter

Urraca succeeded her father as the first queen regnant in European history. Her earliest extant diploma, issued in favour of the León Cathedral a day after her father's funeral, referred to her as "queen of whole Spain". Prominent Leonese, Castilian and Galician aristocrats and twelve bishops witnessed the document, showing that her realm's elite acknowledged her as lawful monarch. Two early sources—the Chronicle of Sahagún and the Historia Compostelana—attribute the proposal about Urraca's marriage to Alfonso I, King of Aragon and Navarre, to the Leonese aristocrats. They were reportedly convinced that a female monarch would be unable to rule and defend the kingdom against the Almoravids and forced Urraca to marry to "the bloodthirsty and cruel Aragonese tyrant" against her will. Bernard of Sédirac, Archbishop of Toledo, raised objections against the marriage, emphasising that Urraca and Alfonso were cousins. In contrast with the two chronicles, Rodrigo Jiménez de Rada writes that Alfonso VI started the negotiations about his heir's marriage with Alfonso I because he wanted to prevent Urraca's marriage with her lover, Gómez González. Gordo Molina and Melo Carrasc propose that both reports could be reliable, because the selection of a suitable husband for his daughter and heir was the elderly King's most important task before his death.

Alfonso I married Urraca in the castle of Monzón in October or November 1109. In December, Urraca granted her "whole land that used to be" her father's to her husband whom she mentioned as "lord and my spouse". In the same document, she stipulated that Alfonso should respect her "like a good husband his good wife" and he could not request the annulment of their marriage referring to their kinship or excommunication. The document confirmed the right of Urraca's son by her first marriage to inherit León in case the couple died without issue. The Galician aristocrats' traditional desire for independence awakened and they used the defense of Alfonso Raimúndez's right to rule Galicia and succeed his mother as a pretext for a rebellion. After their leader Pedro Fróilaz de Traba announced that Urraca had lost her claim to rule Galicia when remarrying, they proclaimed Alfonso Raimúndez king. Pedro Arias, Pedro Gudestéiz and other Galician nobles who remained loyal to Urraca formed a brotherhood against Pedro Fróilaz and his allies. They offered the leadership to Diego Gelmírez, who had been elevated to Bishop of Compostela, but Gelmírez remained neutral in the conflict. Alfonso I and Urraca invaded Galicia and seized the important castle of Monterroso, but reports of the cruelty of the Aragonese troops outraged the Leonese aristocrats. The relationship between Alfonso I and the high clergy grew tense. The bishop of Palencia was imprisoned, the archbishop of Toledo, the bishops of Burgos and León and the abbot of Sahagún were forced to flee.

The marriage proved unfortunate. Alfonso's prejudice against women is well documented and he disliked Urraca's son. She disdained her husband for his superstitious nature, in particular for his fear of ravens and crows, and he killed a Galician noble who had sought Urraca's protection in Monterroso during their campaign in Galicia. Her husband regularly shamed her in the royal court and often went as far as beating and kicking her in public. Urraca's letter of grant to the Abbey of Santo Domingo de Silos is the earliest attestation to her will to get rid of her husband's tutelage. In the document, she styled herself as "queen of whole Spain and daughter of Emperor Alfonso" on 13 June 1110. The exact circumstances of Urraca's separation from her husband are uncertain. According to contemporaneous sources, she left Alfonso after consulting with her advisors. Rodrigo Jiménez de Rada writes that Alfonso repudiated her for her infidelity leaving her "free to do whatever she pleased". The last document mentioning Urraca in her second husband's company was issued on 22 May 1112.

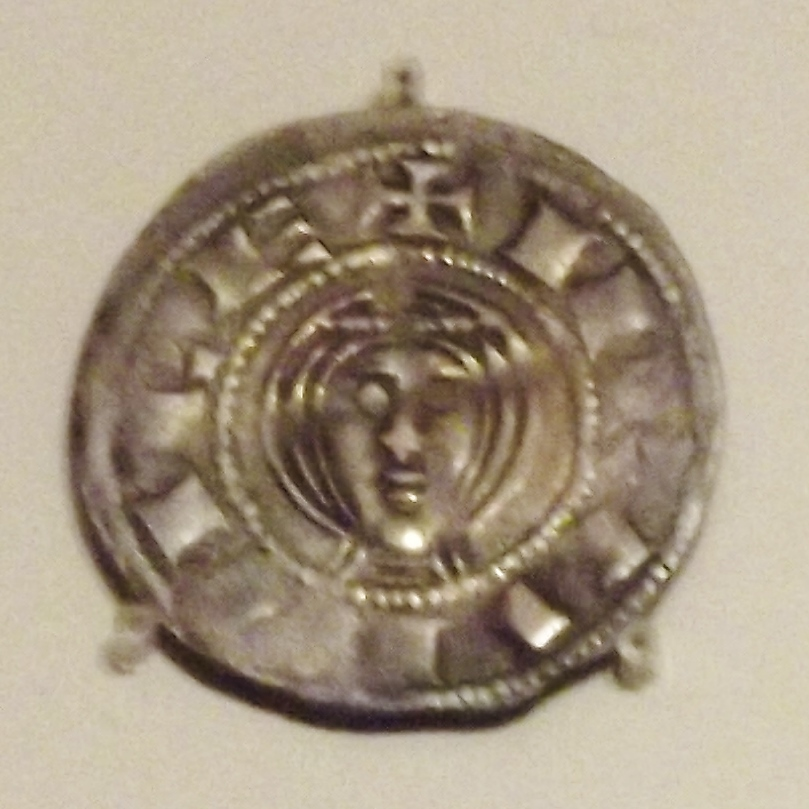
A coin depicting Queen Urraca

The marriage of Urraca and Alfonso almost immediately sparked rebellions in Galicia and scheming by her illegitimate half-sister Theresa and brother-in-law Henry, the countess and count of Portugal. Also, they believed that the new marriage of Urraca could put in jeopardy the rights of the son of her first marriage, Alfonso Raimúndez. One of the first acts of the new spouses was to sign a pact under which the monarchs granted to each other soberana potestas over the other's kingdom, declaring heir of both their future children, and in the case that the union was childless, the surviving spouse would succeed the other one in the throne.

From the start, the Galician faction was divided in two tendencies: one headed by Archbishop Diego Gelmírez of Santiago de Compostela (who defended the position of Alfonso Raimúndez as Urraca's successor) and another led by Count Pedro Fróilaz de Traba, tutor of the young prince (who was inclined to the complete independence of Galicia under the rule of Alfonso). A third group of opposition to the royal marriage was at the court and was headed by Count Gómez González, whose motivation against Urraca and Alfonso I of Aragon could have been his fear of losing power, a sensation soon confirmed when Alfonso I appointed Aragonese and Navarrese nobles for important public posts and as holders of fortresses.

From Galicia, the count of Traba began the first aggressive movement against the monarchs reclaiming the hereditary rights of Alfonso Raimúndez. In response to the Galician rebellion, Alfonso I of Aragon marched with his army to Galicia and in 1110, reestablished the order there after defeating the local troops in Monterroso Castle. The Galician rebellion against the royal power was only the beginning of a series of political and military conflicts which, with the complete opposite personalities of Urraca and Alfonso I and their mutual dislike, gave rise to a continuous civil war in the Hispanic kingdoms over the following years. Urraca did not share the governance of her realms with her husband.

As their relationship soured, Urraca accused Alfonso of physical abuse, and by May 1110 she separated from Alfonso. In addition to her objections to Alfonso's handling of rebels, the couple had a falling-out over his execution of one of the rebels who had surrendered to the queen, to whom the queen was inclined to be merciful. Additionally, as Urraca was married to someone many in the kingdom objected to, the queen's son and heir became a rallying point for opponents to the marriage.

Urraca's realm

Estrangement between husband and wife escalated from discrete and simmering hostilities into open armed warfare between the Leonese-Castilians and the Aragonese. An alliance between Alfonso of Aragon and Henry of Portugal culminated in the 1111 Battle of Candespina in which Urraca's lover and chief supporter Gómez González was killed. He was soon replaced in both roles by another count, Pedro González de Lara, who took up the fight and would father at least two further children by Urraca. By the fall of 1112 a truce was brokered between Urraca and Alfonso with their marriage annulled. Though Urraca recovered Asturias, Leon, and Galicia, Alfonso occupied a significant portion of Castile (where Urraca enjoyed large support), while her half-sister Theresa and her husband Count Henry of Portugal occupied Zamora and Extremadura. Recovering these regions and expanding into Muslim lands would occupy much of Urraca's foreign policy. Despite the annulment of their marriage (on the grounds of consanguinity), Alfonso continued his efforts for political control. While Urraca was engaged in this battle, she also had to contend with the schemes of her sister, who promoted a plan to replace the queen by her son. This particular incident, ended in a compromise between the two sisters where Theresa was granted a vast territory in Leon in exchange for agreeing that she was Urraca's vassal.

According to author Bernard F. Reilly, the measure of success for Urraca's rule was her ability to restore and protect the integrity of her inheritance – that is, the kingdom of her father – and transmit that inheritance in full to her own heir. Policies and events pursued by Alfonso VI – namely legitimizing her brother and thereby providing an opportunity for her illegitimate half-sister to claim a portion of the patrimony, as well as the forced marriage with Alfonso I of Aragon – contributed in large part to the challenges Urraca faced upon her succession. Additionally, the circumstance of Urraca's gender added a distinctive role-reversal dimension to diplomacy and politics, which Urraca used to her advantage.

== Character ==
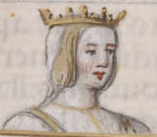
Medieval depiction of Urraca

Urraca is characterized in the Historia Compostelana as prudent, modest, and with good sense. According to Reilly, the chronicle also attributes her failings to "the weakness and changeability of women, feminine perversity", and calls her a Jezebel for her liaisons with her leading magnates, with at least one relationship producing an illegitimate son. Her son Alfonso Raimúndez likewise decried the political turmoil caused by her extramarital affairs. Modern historians have given a more critical outlook to these observations, with Reilly noting that the queen was nevertheless in control of events, in contrast with earlier writers who had described her suitors as the real rulers.

== Death and legacy ==
According to the twelfth-century Chronicon Compostellanum, Urraca died in adulterous childbirth on 8 March 1126 in the castle of Saldaña. As queen, she rose to the challenges presented to her, and her solutions were seen by Reilly as pragmatic ones. Her delaying the accession of her son Alfonso VII nevertheless led to a turbulent transition of power, as the new king would have to face the rebellion of her lover Pedro González upon her death, followed by an attempted invasion by the king of Aragon, and the resumption of Galician revolts.

== Family ==
Urraca's firstborn child by Raymond, Sancha, was born before 11 November 1095. She was named for Urraca's paternal grandmother Sancha of León who transmitted the claim to rule the Kingdom of León to her children. A diploma issued in Monastery of San Xulián de Samos on 24 October 1102 refers to the "children" of Raymond and Urraca, implying that their second child, Alfonso, had been born, but two nearly contemporaneous sources—the Chronicon Compostellanum and the Historia Compostelana—dates Alfonso's birth to 1105. He was named for Urraca's father.

Urraca had two illegitimate children with her lover Pedro González de Lara: Fernando Pérez Hurtado (c.1114-1156), and Elvira Pérez de Lara (c.1112-1174), who is mentioned in the Historia Compostelana in connection with her donation of the village of Arquillinos to Diego Gelmírez. Elvira would twice wed, first to García Pérez de Traba, lord of Trastámara and son of Pedro Fróilaz de Traba, then to count Beltrán de Risnel.

== Sources ==
- Falque, Emma (1994). Historia Compostelana, Edited and translated by E. Falque. Madrid: Akal. ISBN 84-460-0417-8.
- Gordo Molina, Ángel G.; Melo Carrasco, Diego (2018). La reina Urraca I (1109–1126): La práctica del concepto de imperium legionese en la primera mitad del siglo XII [Queen Urraca I (1109–1126): Practice of the Concept of the Imperium Legionese in the First Half of the 12th Century]. Estudios históricos La Olmeda (in Spanish). Ediciones Trea. ISBN 978-84-17140-43-4.
- McMurdo, Edward (1888). The History of Portugal, from the commencement of the monarchy to the reign of Alfonso III. Vol. 1. London, S. Low, Marston, Searle, & Rivington.
- O'Callaghan, Joseph F. (1994) [1975]. A History of Medieval Spain. Cornell University Press. ISBN 0-8014-9264-5.
- Pallares, Maria del Carmen; Portela, Ermelindo (2006). La Reina Urraca [Queen Urraca] (in Spanish). Nerea. ISBN 84-96431-18-5.
- Reilly, Bernard F. (1998). The Kingdom of León-Castilla Under King Alfonso VII, 1126–1157. Philadelphia: University of Pennsylvania Press. ISBN 9780812234527.
- Valverde, Juan Fernández (1989). "De rebus Hispaniae". Historia de los hechos de España. Madrid: Alianza Editorial.

Urraca of León and Castile House of Jiménez Born: April 1079 Died: 8 March 1126
Regnal titles
Preceded by Alfonso VI	Queen of León and Castile; 1109–1126	Succeeded by Alfonso VII
Preceded by Alfonso VI	Queen of Galicia; 1109–1111	Succeeded by Alfonso VII
Preceded by Alfonso VI	Empress of All Spain; 1109–1126 with Alfonso I of Aragon	Succeeded by Alfonso VII
Royal titles
Preceded by Bertha of Italy	Queen consort of Aragon; 1109–1114	Succeeded by Agnes of Aquitaine
Preceded by Bertha of Italy	Queen consort of Navarre; 1109–1114	Succeeded by Marguerite de l'Aigle
