= El Cid (TV series) =

Spanish historical drama television series

- Genre: Historical; Action; Drama
- Created by: José Velasco; Luis Arranz
- Starring: Jaime Lorente; José Luis García Pérez; Elia Galera; Carlos Bardem; Alicia Sanz; Jaime Olías
- Composers: Gustavo Santaolalla; Alfonso González Aguilar
- Country of origin: Spain
- Original languages: Spanish, Arabic
- No. of seasons: 2
- No. of episodes: 10

Production
- Executive producers: José Velasco; Luis Arranz; Adolfo Velasco
- Producer: José Velasco
- Production companies: Zebra Producciones; Amazon Studios

Original release
- Network: Amazon Prime Video
- Release: December 18, 2020 – August 15, 2021

El Cid is a 2020 Spanish historical action drama television series about Rodrigo Díaz de Vivar "El Cid", the 11th-century Castilian knight and warlord. Created by José Velasco and Luiz Arranz for Amazon Prime Video, the series stars Jaime Lorente alongside José Luis García Pérez, Elia Galera, Carlos Bardem, Alicia Sanz and Jaime Olías, among others. The 5-episode first season was released on Prime Video on December 18, 2020, and the 5-episode second season was released on July 15, 2021.

== Premise ==
Ruy is the son of a low-ranking nobleman who died in the service of Ferdinand, Count of Castile (José Luis García Pérez).

Ferdinand, married to Queen Sancha, has become King of León by defeating in battle Sancha's brother, Bermudo. Sancha was next in line to the throne when Ferdinand seized the opportunity to become king after Bermudo's death. Sancha plots with a group of Leonese nobles, notably Flaín, Count of León, and Ruy's grandfather Rodrigo, to overthrow her husband and take the throne that rightfully belongs to her. Sancha is torn between her desire to be queen and her love for her husband. She does not want him harmed, but the nobles have other ideas.

The king's three sons, Sancho, Alfonso, and García are not involved in the plot, but Sancho and Alfonso have their own individual ambitions to succeed their father. Sancha is particularly concerned by the activities of her daughter Urraca, Ferdinand's eldest child, who resents being kept in the line of succession after her brothers because she is a woman, despite the fact that she is older than Sancho, the king's chosen heir and eldest son. Urraca's ambition and resentment lead her to stir up trouble in the Royal Court in the hopes of finding any possible means of obtaining power and territory for herself. Their younger daughter Elvira only wants to get married; she has no political ambitions and is unhappy with the political expectations placed on her.

Ruy is taken by his grandfather to Ferdinand's court where he eventually becomes squire to Sancho. He is attracted to Jimena, who has been brought to court for an arranged marriage with Count Flain's son Orduño. Ruy soon makes an enemy of Orduño due to their rivalry over Jimena.

Ruy becomes aware of the plot against Ferdinand and realizes that his grandfather Rodrigo is involved. He has to find a way to prove his loyalty by preventing the death of the king (whom he despises) and at the same time avoid implicating his grandfather.

== Cast ==
- Jaime Lorente as Ruy
- Lucía Guerrero as Jimena
- José Luis García Pérez as Ferdinand, the Great, Count of Castile, King of León
- Elia Galera as Queen Sancha
- Alicia Sanz as Infanta Urraca, Ferdinand's eldest child and daughter
- Francisco Ortiz as Sancho, Ferdinand's eldest son
- Lucía Díez as Infanta Elvira, Ferdinand's younger daughter
- Jaime Olías as Alfonso, Ferdinand's middle son
- Nicolás Illoro as García, Ferdinand's youngest son
- Ginés García Millán as King Ramiro
- Juan Echanove as Bishop Don Bernardo
- Juan Fernández as Rodrigo, Ruy's grandfather
- Carlos Bardem as Count Flaín of León
- Pablo Álvarez as Orduño, Flaín's son and Ruy's foe
- Alfons Nieto as Vellido
- Sara Vidorreta as Ermesinda
- Rodrigo Poisón as Velarde
- Daniel Albaladejo as Maestro Orotz, sword master
- Álvaro Rico as Nuño
- Adrián Salzedo as Alvar, squire
- Daniel Tatay as Beltrán
- David Castillo as Lisardo, squire
- Ignacio Herráez as Trifon, Ferdinand's champion
- Hamid Krim as Al-Muqtadir
- Zohar Liba as Abu Bakr, Al-Muqtadir's ambassador
- Emilio Buale as Sádaba
- Sarah Perles as Amina, Al-Muqtadir and Farah's daughter, sister of Yusuf, half-sister of Mundir, and Ruy's temporary lover
- TBA as Yusuf, Al-Muqtadir and Farah's son, brother of Amina, and half-brother of Mundir
- Adil Koukouh as Mundir, Al-Muqtadir's son by Naadira, half-brother of Amina and Yusuf, and leader of the Syrian vanguard
- Farah Hamed as Naadira, Mundir's mother, Yusuf and Amina's stepmother, and chief wife of Al-Muqtadir
- María Pedroviejo as Farah, Yusuf and Amina's mother, Mundir's stepmother, and second wife of Al-Muqtadir
- Amparo Alcaraz as Oiubreda or Alberta (Season 2), Sancho's wife

== Episodes ==
Season	Episodes	Originally released	Network	Ref.
1	5	December 18, 2020	Amazon Prime Video	
2	5	July 15, 2021	Amazon Prime Video	

=== Season 1 (2020) ===
No. overall	No. in season	Title	Original release date
1	1	"The Conspiracy" (La conjura)	December 18, 2020
In the Vivar during the 11th century, a young boy called Ruy heads to León with his grandfather Rodrigo, after the death of his father. Ruy grows up and becomes a page, but a tenacious man. Meanwhile in Vivar, there is a conspiracy to usurp the King and install Queen Sancha as the rightful sovereign. The chief conspirator is Count Flaín, with the collusion of Ruy's grandfather Rodrigo. Ruy is made squire of Crown Prince, Sancho, and falls in love with Jimena, who is betrothed to Orduño, son of the Count. Urraca senses the situation, and she suggests to Orduño that he try to sabotage Sancho's saddle during the joust between the knights of King Fernando against the knights of his brother King Ramiro in order to discredit Ruy in the eyes of Sancho. Ruy notices his grandfather conspiring with Count Flain. He follows his grandfather and discovers the plot to kill the king. The next morning at the joust, Urraca uses Jimena to distract Ruy, giving Orduño the chance to carry out his sabotage. The prince loses the match versus his cousin Beltrán. Ruy catches and kills the assassin sent by the conspirators to murder the King.
2	2	"The Ordeal" (Ordalía)	December 18, 2020
The Count Flaín offers a reward for whoever catches the one who foiled his assassination plot and starts a manhunt in the city to find him. By chance, Ruy heads down to a lake to wash his wound in the fight with the assassin and stumbles upon Abu Bakr, who, as it turns out, is an ambassador of Al-Muqtadir of Zaragoza. King Fernando begins to suspect a plot against him and confides in his wife Sancha, who is secretly collaborating with Flaín in the conspiracy. In secret, Fernando convinces Ermesida, the chambermaid of the Count, to subject herself to Count Flaín's lustful desires in order to spy on him. In the morning, Abu Bakr arrives at the court to ask the King to send troops to aid Zaragoza against a mutual enemy, but a messenger appears and informs Fernando that the Navarrese have crossed the border and are marching toward the throne. King Fernando gathers the troops and in order to settle things with minimal casualties, Sancho wants to challenge the strongest enemy soldier Jimeno. The King refuses to let his son compete and substitutes another, but Sancho renders him unconscious and plans to take his place to gain glory and favor in the eyes of his father. In the end, Ruy drugs Prince Sancho to put him to sleep, takes his place, and wins the fight. After the victory celebration, the news of King Ramiro and the siege of Graus comes to King Fernando. Flaín notices the wound on Ruy's shoulder and ascertains that it was he who stopped the assassin.
3	3	"Baraka" (Baraka)	December 18, 2020
Before the battle, Ruy informs the King of the assassination attempt and his personal role in killing the assassin, thus gaining the King's trust. Flaín sends Pedro to kill Ruy, but when he discusses his plan with Celso, Jimena overhears their scheme and escapes before being heard. She then tells Princess Urraca everything she's heard, begging her for aid. When Urraca learns that her mother is involved in the plot, she changes her mind and blackmails Count Flain into releasing Ermesida. Sancho, Ruy, and a group of soldiers arrive in Zaragoza and enjoy the festivities and the entertainment. Ruy meets a woman named Amina and is immediately attracted to her. In the morning, Sancho plans to lead his small army to battle, but Ruy hesitates. Back in León, Fernando learns from Ermesinda that Queen Sancha is part of the scheme to usurp him from the throne, but she continues to play her part. On the night before the battle, Ruy is forced to watch over Ramiro's forces. Pedro sneaks up behind him, but just before he can strike, Sádaba shows up and kills the assassin, saving Ruy's life.
4	4	"Champion" (Campeador)	December 18, 2020
In León, Urraca admits to her mother that she knows everything, and Sancha implores her not to say anything. In the meantime, Fernando decides to make his move by bringing Flaín and his people to a banquet that evening, locking his wife up afterward, and putting an end to all of this. Back on the battlefield, the fighting starts, and Ruy fights bravely. Eventually, Al-Muqtadir and his horseback riders show up to turn the tide of battle. In the midst of the casualties, Varo is tasked to take out Sancho, but Ruy saves his life instead. At the same moment, Sábada stabs and kills King Ramiro. With the Castilians being victorious, Ruy was declared "Champion". Back in León, Sancha tries to convince her daughter to join her side, but Urraca speaks with her father. He, in turn, tells his daughter she lacks valor, but this conversation spurs her to find the fierceness that she lacks. In the evening, Ruy is summoned by Amina and the two make love. At the banquet in León, Fernando was drunk and addresses Orduño and makes him a knight of his own personal guard. Jimena approaches the man to wish him congratulations, but Orduño turns it around in an act of jealousy. When he finds Ruy's bloodied rag in her possession, he tries to force himself on her, but she pushes him away. Back at the banquet, Fernando knows that Ramiro is dead, and he collapses on the ground and begins convulsing as Urraca hurries back to her room with a satisfied smile.
5	5	"Atonement" (Expiación)	December 18, 2020
Now deathly ill, Fernando renounces his position as King. Ruy returns to the troops after the time spent with Amina. Abu Bakr strengthens their friendship with a gift but warns him about consequences surrounding the relationship with the girl. At León, Don and Flaín find evidence that Sancha arranged for the death of her brother, King Bermudo, and the only way out is to marry Flaín after Fernando's death, but she refused. Urraca and her mother try to find a way out of this, and with Sancho and the troops back, that gives them the possibility to see off the threat. Ruy informs his grandfather about the assassination attempt. Sancho, frustrated by his father's condition, pays respect to the soldiers and the comrades who died in battle. At the last moment, King Fernando knights Orduño, much to Ruy's disgust. After the ceremony, he orders that Sancho be named the new King and divides his realm with the other sons: Alfonso with the Kingdom of León, and García with the Kingdom of Galicia, while Urraca and Elvira are given the noble towns of Zamora and Toro on the condition that they remain unmarried. Lastly, he tasks Ruy with watching over his children and making sure that they would never harm each other, but Flaín begins setting another plot to kill Ruy and Sancha. The Count sees the opportunity to strike when together, they mourn the King. But in the streets, after the ceremony, someone stabs Flaín in the back under the eyes of Orduño; and when he sees Ruy, he instantly thinks him responsible.

=== Season 2 (2021) ===
No. overall	No. in season	Title	Original release date
6	1	"Promises and Temptations" (Promesas y tentaciones)	July 15, 2021
After the assassination of Flaín, the Count's son Orduño believes Ruy did it and promises revenge, on the other side, Ruy is desolate not to receive a title and marry Jimena but they will be his when he succeeds. In León, King Alfonso asks Ruy to join him with the much-coveted title in return. Orduño now the new Count of León refuses to end the betrothal with Jimena that his father had given her, and with the promotion of Jimena's father to Count of Oviedo, she can't refuse so as to not ruin her father. Meanwhile, Ruy and the army is forced to go back to Zaragoza at Sancho's orders to collect the gold that Al-Muqtadir refused to pay. At night Sábada tries to kill Ruy because he was sentenced to death for his relationship with Amina but he is saved by Alvar. To force the hand of the Moors, the Castilians burn the mulberry fields around the city and the Emir begrudgingly decides to pay half of the gold after the coronation. Ruy replies to have Amina as a hostage in retribution. Back in León, Urraca pits her brothers against each other, and when she finds out that Jimena and Ruy are in love, she schemes a plan for the situation.
7	2	"The Burden of Duty" (La carga del deber)	July 15, 2021
When the gold arrived from Zaragoza, Sancho suspects Alfonso to be responsible for the Moors refusing to pay for Castile. He then learns that Alfonso tried to convince Ruy to stay by his side. Alfonso realizes this and, following again Urraca's advice, tries to get Ruy to stay by his side by promising to help break off Jimena's betrothal to Orduño and bless their marriage, but they are stopped by their mother. García takes possession of his throne with Nuño as his personal advisor, to the chagrin of the local Galician nobles. Also, Sancho, with his mother, arrives in Castile and rewards Ruy's loyalty by finally knighting him. At Castile, Sancho trains his troops in the winter and Amina is angry with Ruy for his lack of consideration. After some time Alfonso invites Sancho to León and in a demonstration with falcons, Ruy and Urraca fall in an ambush orchestrated under Orduño's orders. In the meantime, Sancho continues to doubt an impending invasion by his brothers and in the celebrations of Sancho's marriage with a Norman princess Oibruda, who the Castilians nickname Alberta, the brothers accuse each other of declaring war on each other in front of Al-Muqtadir but their mother tries to calm the spirits. Noting Ruy with Amina's company, Jimena reconciles her relationship with Orduño and in a burst of jealousy, Ruy has sex with the Emir's daughter. Then the Arabs, who are looking to destabilize the Christian kingdoms, tell Sancha that the King was poisoned. The Queen suspects her daughter Urraca and confronts her, accusing her of not only poisoning the king but also seducing Alfonso, but by accident, she dies from a fall from the balcony.
8	3	"Wind of War" (Viento de guerra)	July 15, 2021
After Sancha's death, the war between the three brothers is imminent. In front of their parents' grave Sancho sets out to attack Galicia, but in order to do that he must pass through León, and Alfonso agrees with García's disdain. Meanwhile, Ruy struggles with the relationship between him and Amina and the pain that Jimena's betrothal with Orduño caused him. He then marches with Sancho for Galicia, but Alfonso and Urraca make a plan to attack the Castilian army from behind and kill Ruy, but at the same time, Sancho and his men discover the betrayal and divide the troops to defend themselves from the probable attack. In Galicia, Garcia tells Nuño that he loves him and they kiss. The nobles accuse García of not having succeeded in taking new soldiers from his Moorish vassal of Badajóz, and Nuño defends Garcia by saying that they are cowards. At that point, the nobles murder Nuño in front of García. The next morning on the battlefield, García leads his army against his brother, and Elvira discovers the deception and tries to warn Ruy but she's stopped by a Leonese guard. Jimena arrives at the ravine in Elvira's place and informs Ruy that the attack was a trick to divide the army, Ruy asks her why she came to him and tries to kiss her but she turns away from him after referring to Amina. At the battle, Velarde was killed while disarmed García, Sancho intervenes but refuses to kill his brother and retreats, but when Ruy and the other troops approach, they sweep away the Galicians for a victory. The King is taken prisoner in Burgos while Sancho nominates himself as the new King with Galicia as a vassal. In León, Alfonso decides to attack his brother by surprise but when the troops come back into the Leonese territory, Sancho misleads Alfonso with a visual trick doubling his army with torches.
9	4	"Ambush" (Emboscada)	July 15, 2021
Alfonso decides to not attack the Castilians but the relationship between the brothers is at the limit. Amina welcomes Ruy and both make love together after the battle but she learns that Jimena is always present in his mind. Meanwhile, Ruy's grandfather is extremely ill and his mother dies with him by her side. The final battle between Castile and León approaches and Alfonso tries to find a deal with the nobles of Badajóz and frees his brother García. This thing infuriates Sancho who sends Ruy on a diplomatic job to ask for help from his Moorish vassals in Zaragoza. At the same time Alfonso make the same with Orduño but Al-Muqtadir accept Ruy's offer only on one condition, Amina has to return home and Ruy is forced to betray her. Knowing his brother wants her dead, Amina demands help from Queen Alberta who helps her make her escape through the castle, and she seeks refuge in Zamora by Urraca. The son of the Emir accuses Ruy of protecting her and letting her escape, meanwhile with Al-Muqtadir's daughter in their possession Alfonso is ready to fight and when Sancho approaches the meeting between the two he falls in an ambush by Alfonso and is forced to retreat and they are saved only by the Moors' intervention. At night Sancho secretly attacks the camp of Alfonso and Orduño is ready for his revenge but Rodrigo, Ruy's grandfather, confesses indirectly that he killed his father and not Ruy. He then punches him in the face, knocking him out, and turns against Ruy who refuses to fight him. Rodrigo challenges his grandson by attacking Sancho who falls to the ground. By that time, Ruy disarms him and kills his grandfather when he invites him with his eyes to do it. In the end, all Leonese soldiers are dead, and Sancho and his men surround Alfonso's tent and capture him.
10	5	"The Path of Hate" (El camino del odio)	July 15, 2021
Sancho has decided to execute his brother Alfonso and the rest of the Leonese nobles who support him, including Orduño, and then he can proclaim himself as King of León and offers Ruy the title of Count when Orduño is executed as a reward for his services. In the meantime, Urraca tries to help her brother and Sancho feels guilty for that. Jimena speaks with Ruy for the life of Orduño and asks to persuade the King to spare his life. The conversation is heard by Amina who confronts Jimena to know who steal Ruy's heart and accused her to be free to stay with Ruy without Orduño between them. When the time of the executions come, Sancho decides to spare the nobles' life only if they swear loyalty to him, and all the prisoners do it including Orduño, when Jimena thanks the King for his benevolence he replies that it was Ruy's request. For that, Jimena speaks with him again, and the two kiss each other and rekindle their relationship. When Alfonso thinks he will be executed, Urraca finds a solution to save his life: proceeding to monastic life in a convent. At the same time as Sancho's coronation, Urraca, along with Amina and Bishop Bernardo, free him and escape with the Emir's daughter to Toledo. For the betrayal, Sancho lays siege on Urraca at Zamora's castle but does not succeed with numerous casualties and is forced to retreat. Sancho, under the influence of Orduño, wants to siege the castle and have all the citizens starve to death if his sister does not surrender. At this point, Urraca is ready to accept the condition but the pride of her people persuades her to refuse, and Sancho reprises his plan. But this time, Ruy refuses to obey his King and, in front of his parents' grave, curses the King.

== Production and release ==
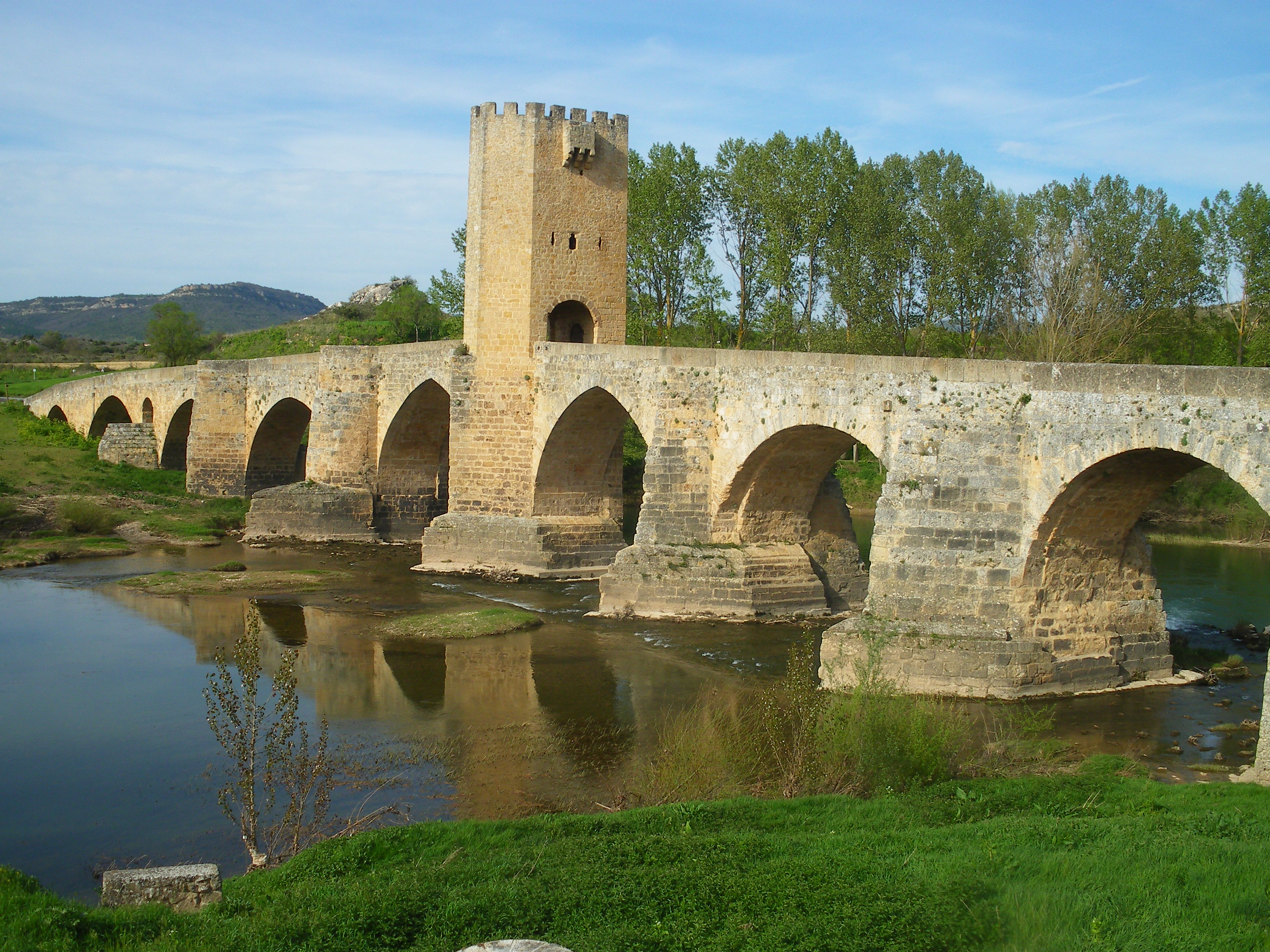
A scene was shot in the medieval bridge of Frías

Filming began in the province of Soria on 1 October 2019. Shooting locations in the province included Almenar de Soria, Almazán, Calatañazor, Duruelo de la Sierra, and the Montes de Ucero in the Cañón del Río Lobos Natural Park. Conversely, shooting locations in the province of Burgos included the medieval bridge in Frías and the Monte Santiago Natural Monument. The Aljafería Palace was used to recreate indoor locations of the Taifa of Zaragoza. Production also moved to province of Teruel (Albarracín) and the Madrid region (including Navalcarnero and Madrid). The five-part first season was released on December 18, 2020, on Prime Video. In January 2021, the confirmation of a second season was reported in media, and a release date for July 15, 2021 was announced in June 2021.

The series' direction crew included Marco A. Castillo, Adolfo Martínez Pérez, Miguel Alcantud, Arantxa Echevarría, Manuel Carballo and Alberto Ruiz Rojo. The score was composed by Gustavo Santaolalla and Alfonso González Aguilar.

== Languages ==
The original languages of El Cid are Spanish and Arabic. The series is also available on Amazon in English, French, Portuguese, German, and other languages.
