= Battle of Golpejera =

Castilian battle between Sancho II and Alfonso VI in 1072

Coordinates: 42°20′N 4°36′W

- Part of the Reconquista
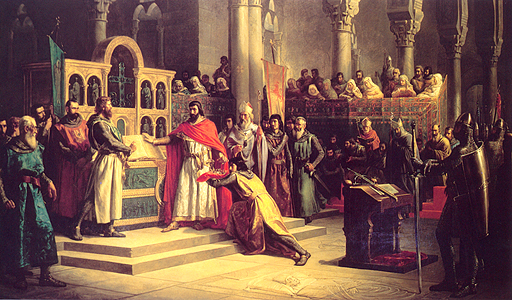
- Alfonso VI taking the Oath of Santa Gadea
Date	January 1072
Location	On the Carrión River, 9 miles south of the city of Santa Maria de Carrion
Result	Victory for Sancho II of Castile

Belligerents
Sancho II of Castile; Castile	Alfonso VI of León; León

Commanders and leaders
Sancho II of Castile; Alférez Rodrigo Díaz de Vivar	Alfonso VI of León

Strength
Unknown	Unknown

Casualties and losses
Unknown	Unknown

The Battle of Golpejera also known as Golpejar, was an internecine battle among Christian kingdoms fought in early January 1072. King Sancho II of Castile (the Strong) defeated the forces of his brother Alfonso VI of León (the Brave) near Carrión de los Condes. It is notable as being one of the battles in which El Cid participated.

== Background ==
In the 11th century, the three kingdoms of Castile, León and Galicia had been united under a single ruler, King Ferdinand I of León, known as The Great. But his elaborate plans for succession led to years of infighting among siblings.

If Ferdinand had followed the Navarrese Succession Law, (Ferdinand was the son of Sancho III of Navarre), then his elder son, Sancho of Castile, should have received either all or most of the inheritance. The nobility of León, however, saw itself as the supreme heir of the ancient Hispanic-Gothic kingdom, and balked at rule under a Castilian monarch since Castile had been merely a frontier county of León. Ultimately, in a King Lear-like compromise, Ferdinand elected to divide among his sons his domains into three kingdoms: Alfonso would inherit León; García, Galicia; and Sancho, Castile. To his two daughters, Urraca and Elvira, he granted the towns of Zamora and Toro.

After his father's death, Sancho made claims on his brother's domains, and invaded the neighboring Christian kingdoms.

== Results and aftermath ==
Location of the Battle was 9 miles south of the historic settlement of Santa Maria de Carrion, now Carrion de los Condes on the Carrion River

Sancho II of Castile defeated his brother, Alfonso VI of León over the Carrión River (9 miles south of the city of Santa Maria de Carrion – the capital of the Beni-Gomez – Christian counts of Saldaña, Liebana, Carrion, and Zamora). The battle started at dawn, and after a hard fight the Castilians were driven from the field. Rodrigo Díaz de Vivar (El Cid) managed to encourage both King and army, and lead them in a new attack the following morning. Alfonso was captured, but released into exile, where he sought refuge in Toledo, which was then in Moorish hands. Despite this outcome, Sancho's victory was short-lived; he was assassinated by treachery while besieging Leonese nobles who had sequestered with Sancho's sister Urraca in the walled town of Zamora. Alfonso was able to return and rule the joint Kingdom of León-Castile.

== In modern culture ==
This battle is featured as part of the series of the El Cid campaign in Age of Empires II: The Conquerors Expansion as "Brother Against Brother" (1999).

The battle is portrayed in the Spanish television series, El Cid, in season 2, episode 4 ("Ambush") (2021).
