= Battle of Llantada =

Battle in Spain in 1068

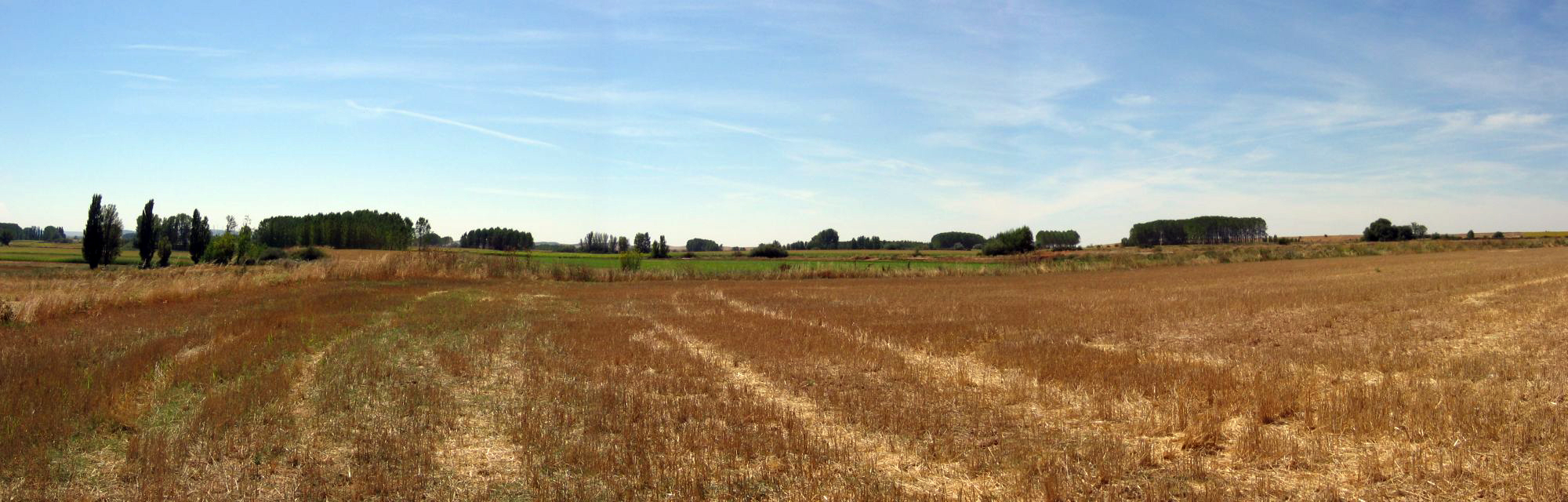
- Field where the battle occurred.
| Date | 19 July 1068 |
| Location | Lantadilla, ten kilometres southwest of Melgar de Fernamental |
| Result | Victory for Castile |

Belligerents
| Castile | León |

Commanders and leaders
| Sancho II of Castile; Rodrigo Díaz de Vivar "El Cid" | Alfonso VI of León |

Strength
| Unknown | Unknown |

Casualties and losses
| Unknown | Unknown |

The Battle of Llantada or Llantadilla was a border skirmish fought on 19 July 1068 on the banks of the Pisuerga near the frontier between León and Castile. There Sancho II of Castile defeated his brother Alfonso VI of León. Though Rodrigo Díaz de Vivar is usually associated with this battle, the evidence of his presence there is rather late and his influence in Castile at that early stage of his career too slight to make plausible the tradition that he was Sancho's alférez.

Llantadilla (Plantata in the Historia Roderici, xvii) was a small village located some ten kilometres southwest of Melgar de Fernamental, and about two kilometers west of the river Pisuerga on the Leonese side of the frontier. The closeness of the location of battle to the border suggests that no major invasion took place. The skirmish may have resulted from the increasing ambitions of Sancho, the eldest son of Ferdinand I, whose inheritance was smaller than his brother's. Sancho may have been encouraged by his brother's ambitious invasion of the Taifa of Badajoz, whose king, al-Muzzaffar, was fatally ill, sometime between 1 May and 7 June 1068. Alfonso succeeded in extorting a tribute from the ailing king, despite that the parias of Badajoz had been relegated to his and Sancho's younger brother, García II, in the division of the realm after Ferdinand's death (1065). Bernard Reilly writes that "such an initiative on Alfonso's part would have been the first, unmistakable sign of his intention to depart from the settlement arranged by his father."

Pelayo of Oviedo is the earliest source for the battle, and he probably relied on stories then current or from his childhood. He attributes the victory to Sancho and says that Alfonso returned to León. Subsequent historians treated the battle as a sort of judicial duel deciding which brother would accede to the other's kingdom. Already in Pelayo's chronicle the influence of this interpretation, abetted by hindsight, are evident. The late-twelfth-century Chronica Naierensis provides a year for the battle (1068), but otherwise relies on Pelayo. The slightly earlier Annales Complutenses place it on 19 July, though there is a discrepancy in the record, since 19 July was not a Wednesday but a Saturday.

The presence of Alfonso at the battle is made slightly improbable by the existence of a charter issued to the monastery of Sahagún on 7 July, presumably at or near Sahagún, since it was in the presence of the abbot and prior. On 20 July, the day after the battle if the Annales Complutenses can be trusted, Alfonso's alférez, Martín Alfónsez, confirmed a private donation to Sahagún. Likewise, the long-term effect of the battle was muted. Alfonso resumed his attack on Badajoz, now ruled by the old king's two rival sons, between 22 November 1068, when the king was again at Sahagún, and March 1069.

== Sources ==
- Reilly, Bernard F. 1988. The Kingdom of León-Castilla under King Alfonso VI, 1065–1109. Princeton: Princeton University Press.
