= War of the Three Sanchos =

Medieval war in the Iberian Peninsula

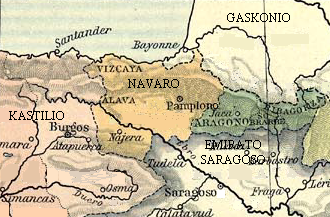
- Castile; Navarre; Aragon (1037)
Date	1065 – 1067
Location	Iberian Peninsula
Result	Castilian victory
Territorial changes	Castile annexes La Bureba, Montes de Oca and Pancorbo

Belligerents
Kingdom of Castile	Kingdom of Navarre; Kingdom of Aragon

Commanders and leaders
Sancho II of Castile	Sancho IV of Navarre; Sancho of Aragon

The War of the Three Sanchos (Spanish: Guerra de los Tres Sanchos) was a brief military conflict between three Spanish kingdoms in 1065–1067. The kingdoms were all ruled by Jiménez kings who were first cousins: Sancho II of Castile, Sancho IV of Navarre, and Sancho Ramírez of Aragon, all grandsons of Sancho the Great. The primary source for the war is the thirteenth-century Primera crónica general.

The brief war was ignited in part by the strife left over from the division of the kingdom of Sancho the Great in 1035. That division had left Navarre with a supremacy over the "petty kingdoms" (regula) of Castile and Aragon, but by 1065 Navarre was a vassal of Castile (now joined with the Kingdom of León). In 1065 Ferdinand the Great, the Castilian monarch died and his kingdom was divided between his sons, with the eldest, Sancho, taking Castile. Sancho of Castile was covetous of the lands of Bureba and Alta Rioja. Ferdinand had helped reconquer them from the Caliphate, but then had ceded them to his elder brother García Sánchez III of Navarre, the father of Sancho IV.

After an initial series of frontier raids, Sancho IV of Navarre asked for an alliance from Sancho Ramírez of Aragon. Most of the war took place in the region of Burgos and La Rioja. The war was also fought over Castile's ability to take part in the Reconquista, a capacity which had been diminished by the division of Ferdinand's kingdom in 1065. Sancho of Castile did try to extend his influence over the Muslim taifa of Zaragoza, which owed him parias. According to the twelfth-century Crónica Najerense, a battle was fought during which campaign his alférez, Rodrigo Díaz de Vivar, defeated his Navarrese counterpart, Jimeno Garcés, and gained the nickname campi doctor or "master of the field [of battle]", later to become famous in Spanish literature as el Campeador.

Between August and September 1067 Sancho Ramírez led a counterattack against Castile. Tradition is divided over who had the victory, the Chronicle of San Juan de la Peña attributes a rout to the Navarrese and Aragonese at Viana, while the Primera crónica attributes victory to Sancho of Castile. Ramón Menéndez Pidal and Bernard F. Reilly accept the latter tradition, Reilly citing a donation of December 1167 to the monastery of Oña by a Flaino Oriolez dominator Tetelie, a landholder in the Trespaderna district of the upper Ebro Valley. The participation of a Castilian magnate from the Navarrese border in an act by which Sancho formally defined the jurisdiction of the Diocese of Oca (the only bishopric in Castile) strongly suggests that Sancho was in a strong position. The chronicler of San Juan de la Peña, a Navarrese source, wrote that Sancho of Castile was forced to raise the siege of Viana and flee on a horse bedecked only in its halter; that he subsequently convinced Abd ar-Rahman of Huesca to go to war with Aragon; and that Sancho Ramírez eventually made peace with him anyway.

Castile retook Álava, the Montes de Oca, and Pancorvo, as well as Bureba and Alta Rioja, but the conflict ended in a stalemate 1067 when the death of Sancha of León, Ferdinand's widow, opened the way to war between Ferdinand's sons. The central issue in the conflict, the possession of the border territories, was resolved in 1076 when Sancho IV of Navarre was assassinated by his own brother and his kingdom partitioned between Sancho Ramírez of Aragon, who became king of Navarre as Sancho V, and Alfonso VI of León and Castile, who received the disputed lands.
