= Alberta, Queen of Castile =

Alberta (fl. 1071) was the queen consort of King Sancho II of Castile (1065–1072).

She is known only from two documents. The earlier, dated 26 March 1071, is a charter issued by Sancho to the monastery of San Pedro de Cardeña. The occasion of this charter was a meeting of Sancho with his brother, King Alfonso VI of León, and his sisters Elvira and Urraca along with the higher clergy of his kingdom in Burgos, probably to discuss the misrule of their brother, King García II of Galicia. The second document, dated 10 May 1071, is a private charter for the monastery of San Pedro de Arlanza. It is dated by the reign of Sancho and Alberta in Castile and Galicia, indicating that the deposition of García agreed at Burgos earlier in the year had been effected by Sancho: "King Sancho and Queen Alberta reigning in Castile and in Galicia" (regnante rex Sancio et Alberta regina in Castella et in Gallecia).

The name Alberta is unusual for 11th-century Spain and it is probable that she came from abroad. Her marriage to Sancho would have brought him prestige that his unmarried brothers did not yet possess. Her foreign origins would have allowed him to remain outside of the network of aristocratic kin groups and aloof from their disputes. She presumably survived Sancho, who died in 1072, but her ultimate fate is unknown.

The origins of Alberta are unknown. The only medieval sources to provide evidence on the point are unreliable. The contemporary William of Poitiers records that two of the brothers (Sancho, Alfonso and García) competed for the hand of a daughter of King William I of England, but William is not known to have had a daughter named Alberta. Other reports state that William's daughter was Agatha and that the contestants were Alfonso and Duke Robert Guiscard. She was betrothed to Alfonso but died before the marriage.

The late 12th-century Chronicle of Nájera records a different tradition. It says that Sancho's fiancée was the daughter of his uncle, King García Sánchez III of Navarre. She was raped by her illegitimate half-brother, Sancho Garcés, who fled to the protection of King al-Muqtadir of Zaragoza and King Ramiro I of Aragon. In defence of his bride, Sancho attacked both and killed Ramiro in the battle of Graus in 1070. This tale, however, is a literary invention and completely unreliable. The historical battle of Graus took place in 1063.

Although not a significant figure in the legend of El Cid, Doña Alberta plays an important role in the three-act play La jura en Santa Gadea (1845) by Juan Eugenio Hartzenbusch, in which El Cid is held to have killed Ramiro. El Cid, who was at the historical battle of Graus, was also a witness to the charter of 26 March 1071.

== Bibliography ==
- Cordero Carrete, F. R. (1952). "De los esponsales de una hija de Guillermo el Conquistador con un rey de Galicia". Cuadernos de Estudios Gallegos. 7: 55–78.
- Flood, Timothy M. (2019). Rulers and Realms in Medieval Iberia, 711–1492. McFarland.
- González Mínguez, César (2002). "El proyecto político de Sancho II de Castilla (1065–1072)". Publicaciones de la Institución Tello Téllez de Meneses. 73: 77–99.
- González Ruiz-Zorrilla, Atilano (1957). "Sobre la Restauración de la diócesis de Braga en 1070". Hispania Sacra. 10: 431–442.
- Iranzo, Carmen (1978). Juan Eugenio Hartzenbusch. Twayne Publishers.
- Menéndez Pidal, Ramón (1969). La España del Cid. Vol. 2 vols. Espasa-Calpe.
- Reilly, Bernard F. (1988). The Kingdom of León-Castilla under King Alfonso VI, 1065–1109. Princeton University Press. ISBN 9788487103032.
