= Crucifix of Ferdinand and Sancha =

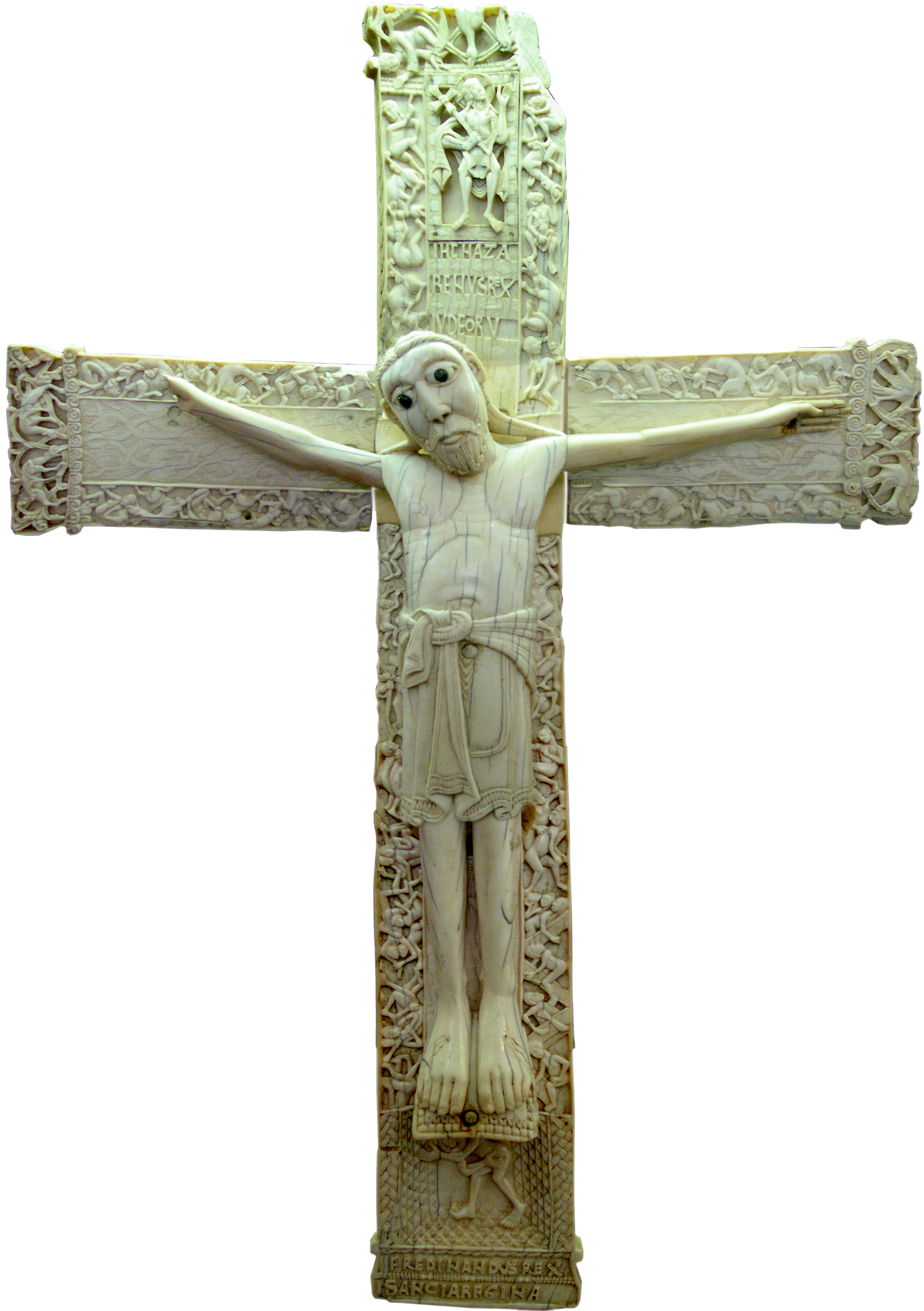
Obverse of the crucifix

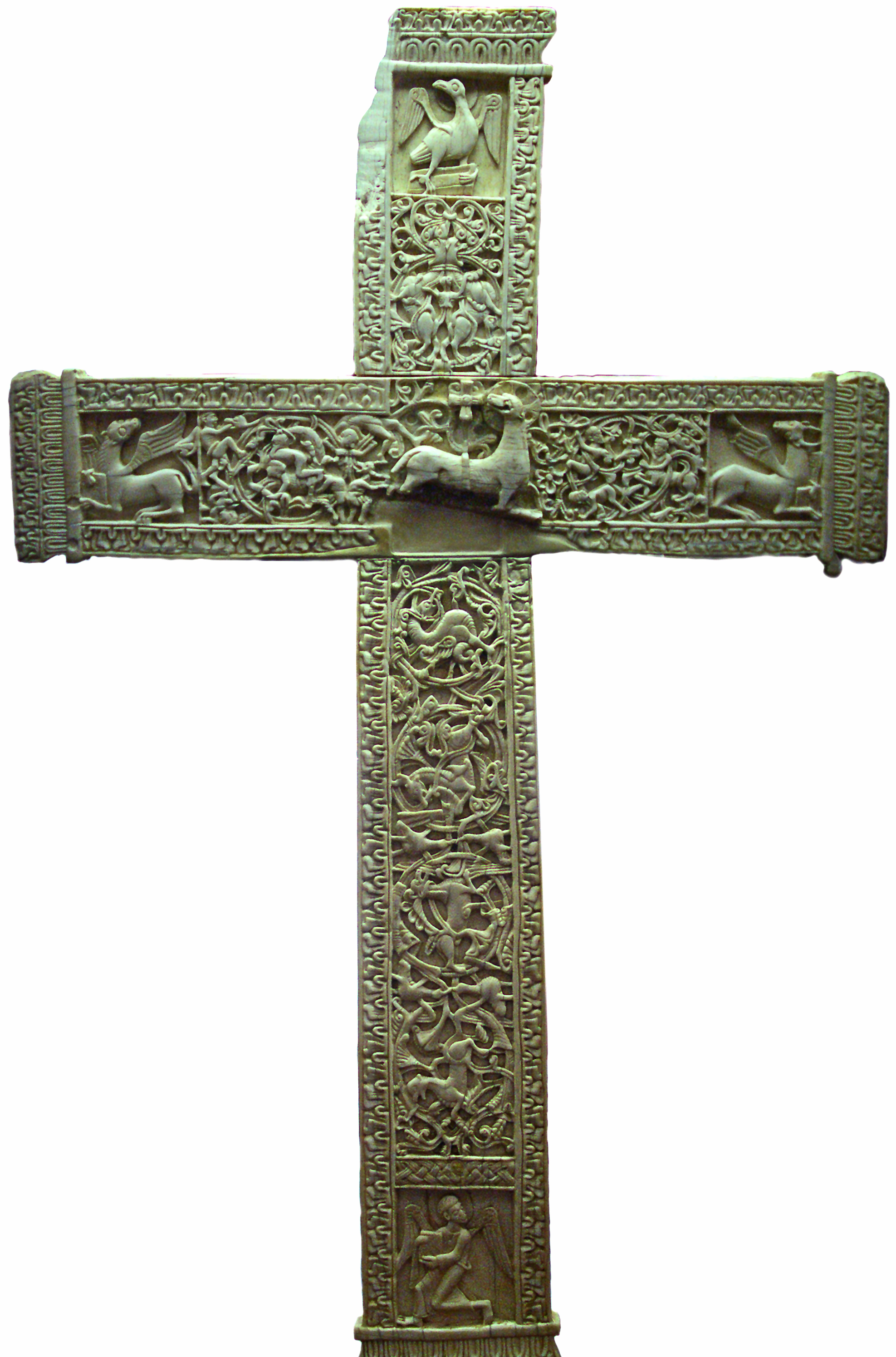
Reverse of the crucifix

The crucifix of Ferdinand and Sancha (Spanish: crucifijo de don Fernando y doña Sancha) is an ivory carving from circa 1063, today in the National Archaeological Museum of Spain, in Madrid. It was part of an offering by King Ferdinand I of León and Queen Sancha to furnish the basilica of San Isidoro de León. It is the earliest known crucifix from Spain depicting the body of Christ. Although earlier Spanish crucifixes of gold, ivory and wood are known, they are all without images. The official inventory of the royal gift describes the crucifix as "a cross of ivory with the image of our crucified Redeemer". It measures 52 cm high, 34.5 cm wide, and 1 cm thick, with the width of the cross beams being 7 cm. The image of Christ is 305 mm tall.

The figure of Christ is shown with its heading reclining to the left, its large eyes wide open and encrusted with jet, and sporting a beard and moustache. (Jet eyes were common at the time in ivory sculptures of the region.) Each foot is shown nailed individually to the cross. The fingers of Christ's right hand are missing. His perizonium (loin cloth) covers him to the knees and is tied at his waist. The legs and torso are perfectly vertical. There is a small space behind the body so the piece could serve as a reliquary, as was typical.

On the obverse of the cross are intertwined images of plants and animals, and of humans either ascending to paradise or descending to hell. Above the image of Christ is the inscription:

IHSNAZA
RENUSREX
IUDEORU

which translates "Jesus of Nazareth, the King of the Jews", the citation placed on the cross according to the Four Gospels. Above the inscription on the ivory is a representation of the resurrected Christ carrying a cross. At the base of the cross, below the crucified figure, is a figure of Adam, and below that the inscription:

FREDINANDUSREX
SANCIAREGINA

indicating the commissioners of the work, King Ferdinand and Queen Sancha. The reverse of the cross bears plant figures, in the centre the Agnus Dei, and at the four extremities of the arms the symbols of the Four Evangelists.

== See also ==
- Carrizo Christ

== Bibliography ==
- Gómez-Moreno, María Elena (1947). Mil Joyas del Arte Español. Barcelona: Instituto Gallach.
- Park, Marlene (1973). "The Crucifix of Fernando and Sancha and its Relationship to North French Manuscripts". Journal of the Warburg and Courtauld Institutes. Vol. 36. pp. 77–91.
- Sureda, Joan (1988). Historia Universal del Arte: Románico/Gótico. Barcelona: Editorial Planeta. ISBN 84-320-6684-2.
- The Art of Medieval Spain, A.D. 500–1200. The Metropolitan Museum of Art, New York. 1993. ISBN 9780810964334.
