= Chalice of Doña Urraca =

Jewel-encrusted onyx chalice, alleged to be the Holy Chalice

- Cáliz de doña Urraca
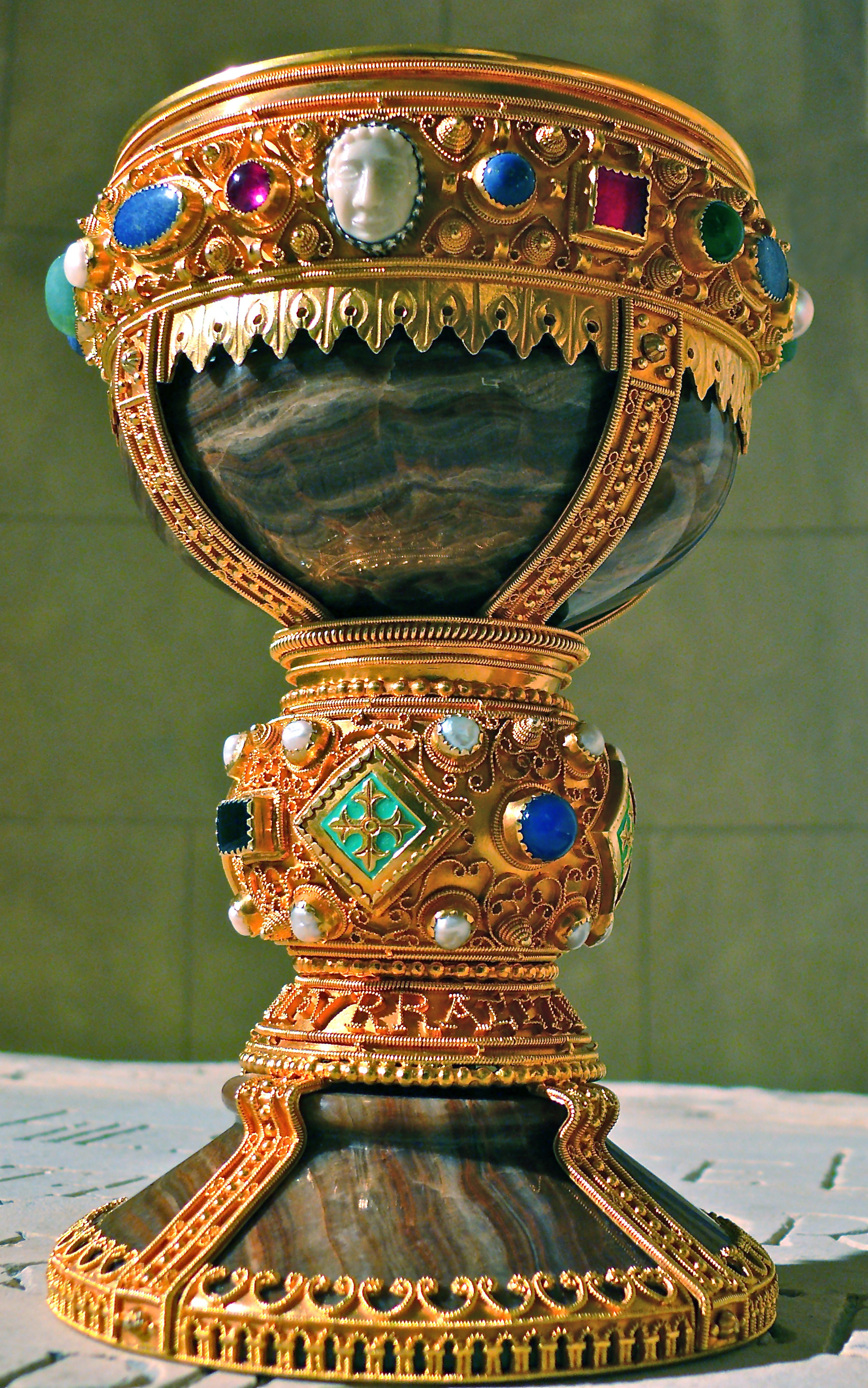
- A replica of the Chalice of Doña Urraca
- Material: Onyx
- Present location: Museum of St. Isidore's Basilica, León

The Chalice of Doña Urraca is a jewel-encrusted onyx chalice kept at St. Isidore's Basilica in León, Spain, which belonged to infanta Urraca of Zamora, daughter of Ferdinand I of Leon.

In March 2014, Spanish authors Margarita Torres and José Ortega del Rio asserted the chalice could be the purported Holy Grail. The claim was met with disbelief by some historians and specialists, who claim the materials and techniques used in the chalice indicate a mid-11th century origin, however; the allegations led to unprecedented crowds swarming to the Basilica to see it, which led to the setting aside of a separate exhibition room only for the chalice.

== Location ==
The chalice is kept at St. Isidore's Basilica in León, Spain, where some historians say it has been since the 11th century.

The publication of The Kings of the Grail in March 2014, which claims the chalice is the Holy Grail, led museum staff at the basilica to swiftly withdraw the chalice from display, saying the crowds seeking to visit the museum were too large for it to handle. The museum now displays the chalice in a separate room in the tower alongside the old library.

== History and Holy Grail claims ==
Authors and researchers Professor Margarita Torres Sevilla of the University of Leon and Dr. José Miguel Ortega del Río of the Fundación Siglo para el Turismo y las Artes de Castilla y León published their book, The Kings of the Grail, in April, 2015 claiming they had traced the origins of the chalice to the early Christian communities of Jerusalem.

The researchers say the chalice was transported to Cairo by Muslim travelers and was later given to an emir on the Spanish coast who had assisted victims of a famine in Egypt. From there, the chalice came into the possession of King Ferdinand I of Leon, father of the infanta Doña Urraca of Zamora, as a peace offering by an Andalusian ruler.

According to Torres and del Río, the original onyx cup was likely embellished with gold and gems in the 11th Century by the Doña Urraca, and the chalice has been identified with her name since then.

Archaeologists quickly sought to dispel Torres and del Rio's claims, pointing out that an estimated 200 different cups and chalices across Europe "vie for the title". Diarmaid MacCulloch, Professor of the History of the Church at Oxford University, said the claims were "idiotic". The authors expressed uncertainty about whether Jesus actually used the cup.

According to Torres, "the only chalice that could be considered the chalice of Christ is that which made the journey to Cairo and then from Cairo to León — and that is this chalice".

To make the chalice more accessible, in 2017 it was digitalized, modeled in 3D and made available for watching it wearing VR glasses. Visitor to the museum can have the experience of having the virtual chalice in their hands and analyzing all its details.

== See also ==
- Holy Chalice at the Cathedral of Valencia.
