= Elvira of Toro =

11th-century Spanish royal

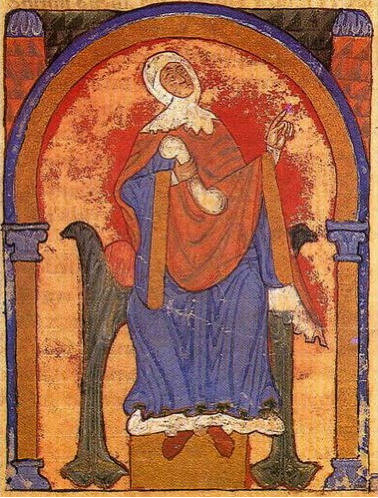
A medieval depiction of Elvira

Elvira (1038 or 1039 – 15 November 1101) was a Leonese infanta and the Lady of Toro, Zamora, the daughter of Ferdinand I of León and Sancha of León, and granddaughter-namesake of Elvira Menéndez, and also an aunt of Elvira of Castile, Queen of Sicily.

She made an important donation of lands to the monastery of San Salvador de Oña in the year 1087. She received the city of Toro on the death of her father, while her sister Urraca received Zamora, and her brothers Sancho II, Alfonso VI and García received the kingdoms of Castile, León, and Galicia respectively.

Elvira was buried in the Royal Pantheon at the Basilica of San Isidoro.
