= Carrizo Christ =

11th-century ivory carving

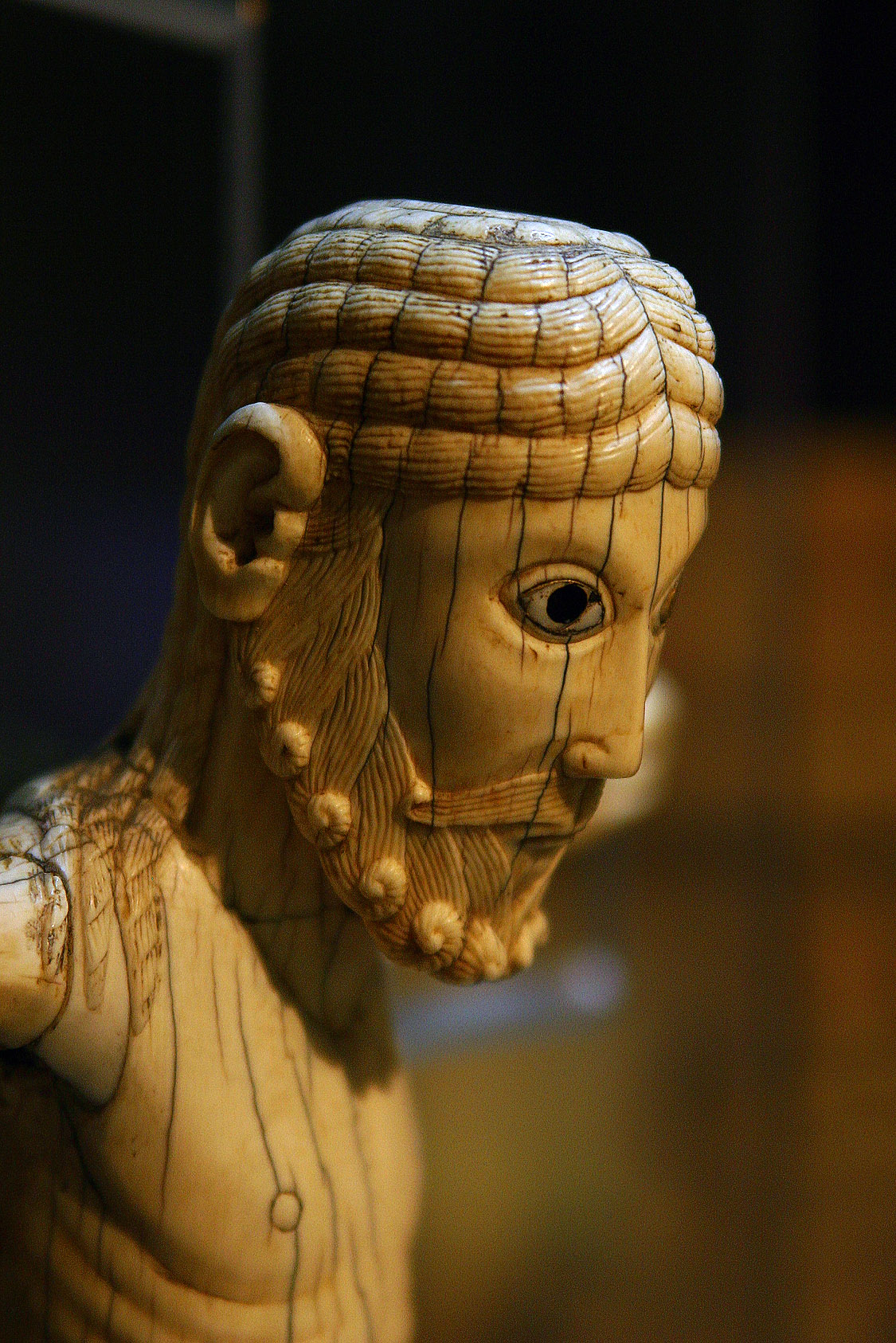
Carrizo Christ

The Carrizo Christ is an 11th-century ivory carving and is conserved in the Museo de León, León (Spain). The figure is 13 inches (33 cm) high. The piece came from the Cistercian monastery of Santa María de Carrizo located some 16 miles west of León.

The figure of Christ is impressive due to the size of the head and his largue eyes wide open. Hands and feet as well are conceived out of proportion to the rest of the body.

== See also ==
- Crucifix of Ferdinand and Sancha

== Bibliography ==
- VV.AA. (1993). The Art of Medieval Spain, A.D. 500-1200. The Metropolitan Museum of Art, New York. ISBN 9780810964334.
