= Sancha of León =

Queen of León from 1037 to 1065

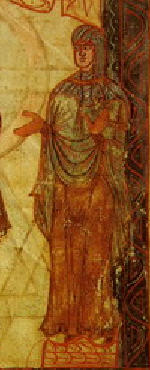

Queen consort of León
- Tenure: 1037–1065

Countess consort of Castile
- Tenure: 1032–1065
- Born: c. 1018
- Died: 8 November 1067
- Burial: Basilica of San Isidoro
- Spouse: Ferdinand I of León
- Issue: Urraca of Zamora; Sancho II; Elvira of Toro; Alfonso VI; García II
- House: Astur-Leonese dynasty
- Father: Alfonso V of León
- Mother: Elvira Menéndez

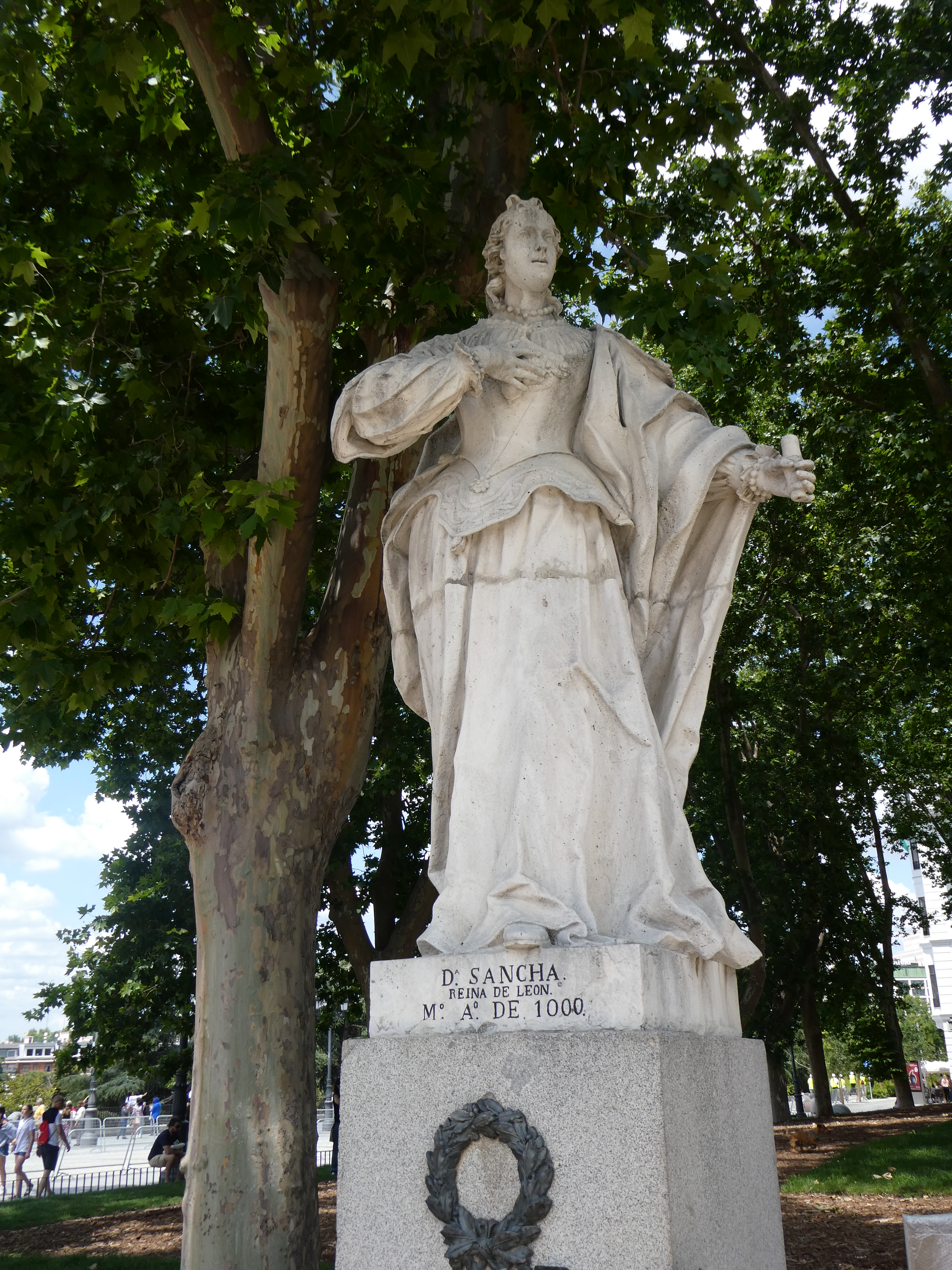
Statue outside the Royal Palace of Madrid

Sancha of León (c. 1018 – 8 November 1067) was infanta and queen of León. She was married to Ferdinand I, the Count of Castile who later became King of León after having killed Sancha's brother in battle. She and her husband commissioned the Crucifix of Ferdinand and Sancha.

== Life ==
Sancha was a daughter of Alfonso V of León by his first wife, Elvira Menéndez. She became a secular abbess of the Monastery of San Pelayo.

In 1029, a political marriage was arranged between her and count García Sánchez of Castile. However, having traveled to León for the marriage, García was assassinated by a group of disgruntled vassals. In 1032, Sancha was married to García's nephew and successor, Ferdinand I of Castile, when the latter was 11 years old.

At the Battle of Tamarón in 1037 Ferdinand killed Sancha's brother Bermudo III of León, making Sancha the heir and allowing Ferdinand to have himself crowned King of León. Sancha's own position as queen of León is unclear and contradictory. She succeeded to the throne of León as the heir of her brother and in her "own right" but despite this, she is not clearly referred to as queen regnant, and after the death of her husband the throne passed to her son, despite the fact that she was still alive.

Following Ferdinand's death in 1065 and the division of her husband's kingdom, she is said to have played the futile role of peacemaker among her sons.

She was a devout Catholic, who, with her husband, commissioned the crucifix that bears their name as a gift for the Basilica of San Isidoro.

== Children ==
Sancha had five children:

- Urraca of Zamora
- Sancho II of León and Castile
- Elvira of Toro
- Alfonso VI of León and Castile
- García II of Galicia

== Death and burial ==
She died in the city of León on 8 November 1067. She was interred in the Royal Pantheon of the Basilica of San Isidoro, along with her parents, brother, husband, and her children Elvira, Urraca and García.

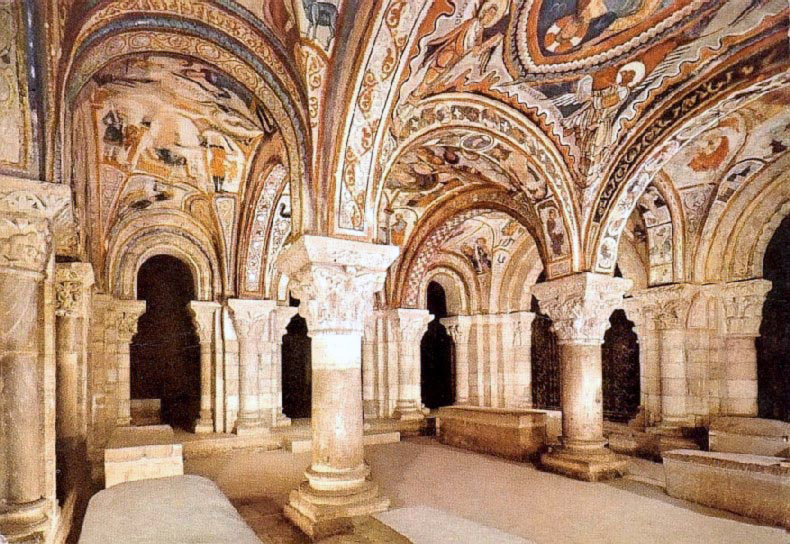
The Royal Pantheon

The following Latin inscription was carved in the tomb in which were deposited the remains of Queen Sancha:

"H. R. SANCIA REGINA TOTIUS HISPANIAE, MAGNI REGIS FERDINANDI UXOR. FILIA REGIS ADEFONSI, QUI POPULAVIT LEGIONEM POS DESTRUCTIONEM ALMANZOR. OBIIT ERA MCVIIII. III N. M."

Which translates to:

"Here lies Sancha, Queen of All Spain, wife of the great king Ferdinand and daughter of king Alfonso, who populated León after the destruction of Almanzor. Died in the one thousand one hundred eighth era on the third nones of May [5 May 1071]."

== Bibliography ==
- Blanco Lozano, Pilar. Colección diplomática de Fernando I (1037–1065). León: Centro de Estudios e Investigación «San Isidoro» (CSIC-CECEL) y Archivo Histórico Diocesano, 1987. ISBN 84-00-06653-7.
- Sánchez Candeira, Alfonso (1999) [1950]. Rosa Montero Tejada (ed.). Castilla y León en el siglo XI, estudio del reinado de Fernando I (in Spanish). Madrid: Real Academia de la Historia. ISBN 978-84-8951241-2.

Preceded by Jimena of Castile	Queen consort of León; 1037–1065	Succeeded by Alberta
