= Lantadilla =

Coordinates: 42°20′N 4°16′W

- municipality
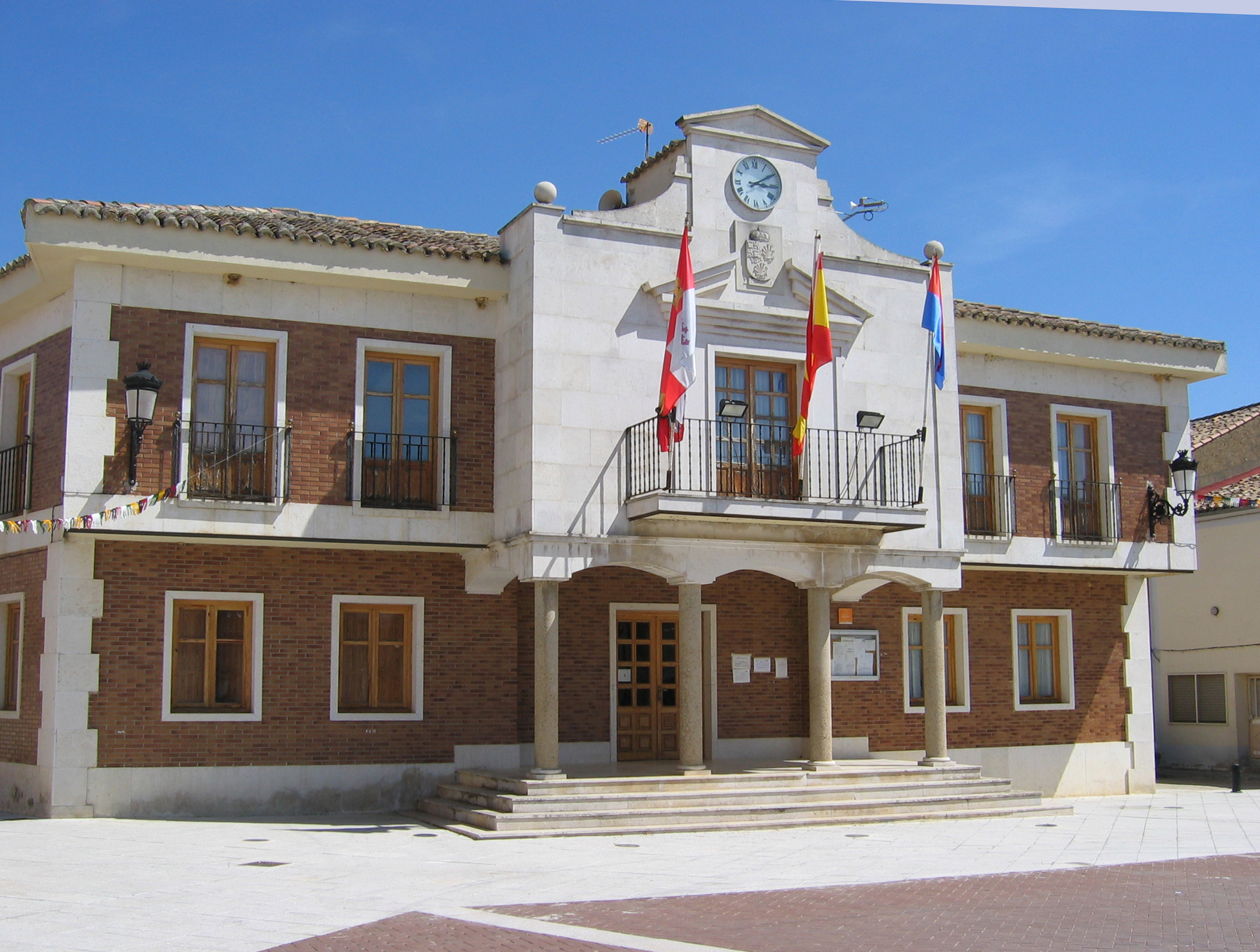

- Flag Coat of arms
- Interactive map of Lantadilla
- Country: Spain
- Autonomous community: Castile and León
- Province: Palencia
- Municipality: Lantadilla

Area
  - Total: 28.95 km^{2} (11.18 sq mi)
- Elevation: 769 m (2,523 ft)

Population (2025-01-01)
  - Total: 277
  - Density: 9.57/km^{2} (24.8/sq mi)
- Time zone: UTC+1 (CET)
  - Summer (DST): UTC+2 (CEST)
- Website: Official website

Lantadilla is a municipality located in the province of Palencia, Castile and León, Spain. According to the 2009 census (INE), the municipality has a population of 368 inhabitants.
