= Sancho II of Castile and León =

Sancho II
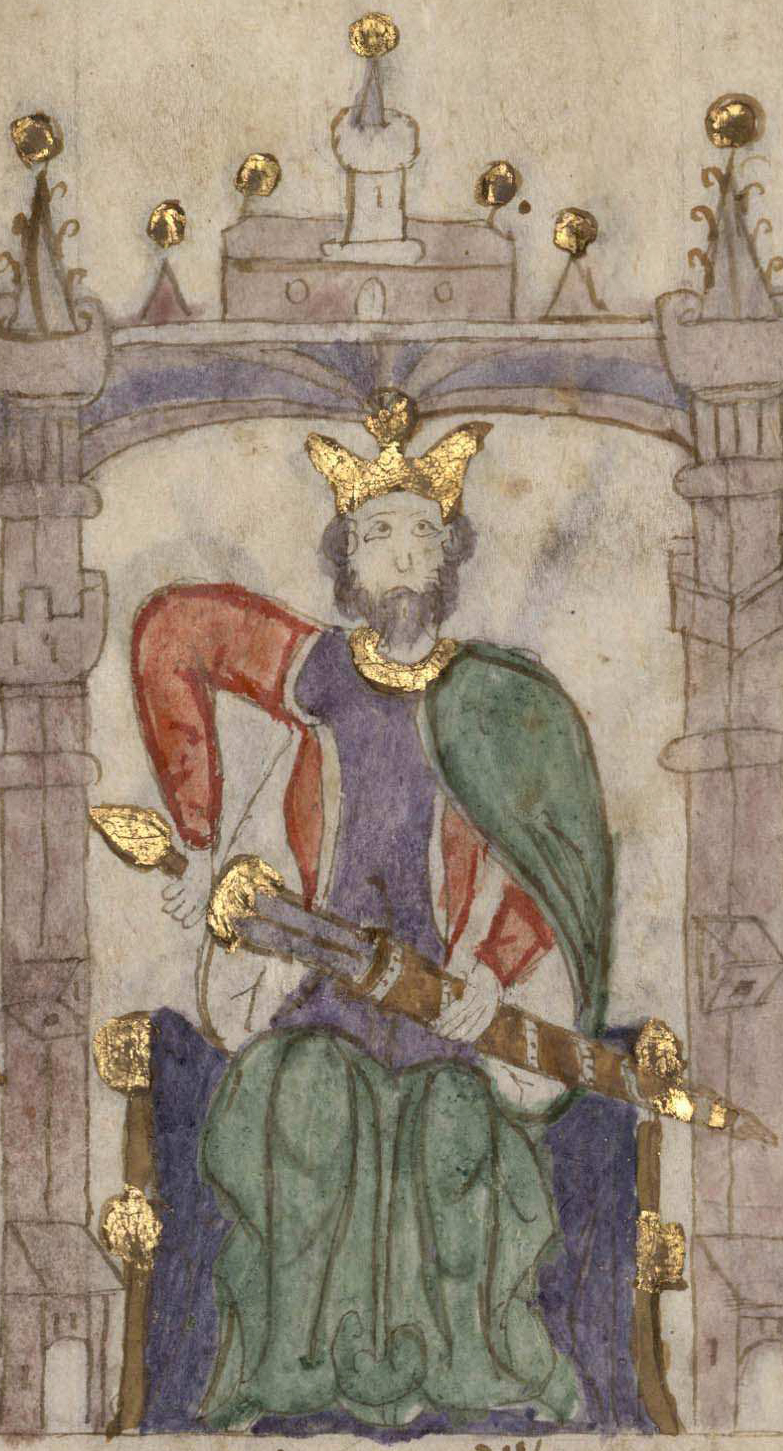
- Sancho II in the Castilian manuscript Compendium of Chronicles of Kings (...) (c. 1312–1325). Currently located at Biblioteca Nacional de España.

King of Castile
- Reign: 1065–1072
- Predecessor: Ferdinand I (as Count)
- Successor: Alfonso VI

King of León
- Reign: 1072
- Coronation: 12 January 1072 (León)
- Predecessor: Alfonso VI
- Successor: Alfonso VI

King of Galicia
- Reign: 1071–1072
- Predecessor: García II
- Successor: Alfonso VI
- Born: c. 1036/1038; Zamora, Kingdom of León
- Died: 7 October 1072 (aged 33–36); Zamora, Kingdom of León
- Burial: San Salvador de Oña
- Consort: Alberta
- Dynasty: Jiménez
- Father: Ferdinand I of León and Castile
- Mother: Sancha of León

Sancho II (1036/1038 – 7 October 1072), called the Strong (el Fuerte), was King of Castile (1065–72), Galicia (1071–72) and León (1072).

== Family ==
Born at Zamora, Sancho was the eldest son of Ferdinand the Great and Sancha of León. He was married to Alberta, known by name only from her appearance as Sancho's wife in contemporary charters. Chronicler William of Poitiers related that competition for the hand of a daughter of William I, King of England led to strife between two sons of Ferdinand I, and some historians have thus speculated that Sancho's wife, with her non-Iberian name, may have been the daughter in question. However, two later Norman chroniclers report that it was Alfonso VI's betrothed, and not Sancho's wife Alberta, who was William's daughter.

After Ferdinand the Great defeated and killed his wife's brother in battle, he was crowned King of León and Castile and called himself Imperator totius Hispaniae ("Emperor of all of Spain"). When the kingdom was divided following Ferdinand's death in 1065, Sancho succeeded his father as King of Castile, while Sancho's younger brother Alfonso become King of León and his youngest brother García became king of the reestablished Kingdom of Galicia (partitioned from León). Each of the brothers was also assigned a sphere of influence among the Taifa states, with Sancho designated to receive the parias (tributary payments) from the Taifa of Zaragoza. Ferdinand also granted some holdings to his two daughters, giving Urraca control of the city of Zamora and Elvira the city of Toro, both enclaved within Alfonso's Kingdom of León.

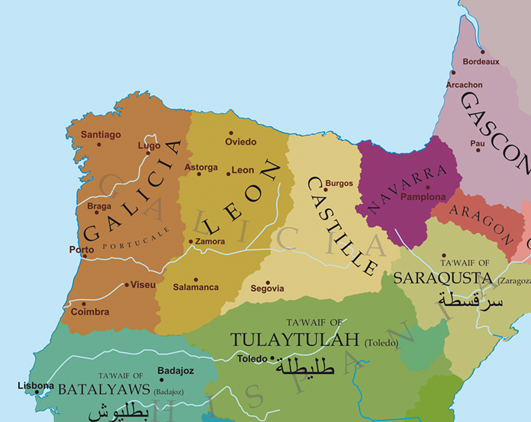
Kingdoms in the Northern Iberian Peninsula around 1065: Garcia II's Kingdom of Galicia Alfonso VI's Kingdom of León Sancho II's Kingdom of Castile Taifas paying parias to these kings: Badajoz, owing tribute to Garcia Seville, owing tribute to Garcia Toledo, owing tribute to Alfonso Zaragoza, owing tribute to Sancho

== Reign ==
In 1068, Sancho defeated his cousins Sancho IV of Navarre and Sancho of Aragon in the War of the Three Sanchos. This expanded his Kingdom of Castile with the reconquered land of Bureba, Alta Rioja, and Álava, which his father had given to Sancho IV's father, García, for his support in defeating Bermudo III of León. The same year, Alfonso invaded the Taifa of Badajoz, a client state of his brother Garcia's Kingdom of Galicia. Sancho, concerned that Alfonso had intentions on conquering his brothers, defeated Alfonso at the Battle of Llantada, reinstating the status quo. Sancho would develop his own appetite for his youngest brother's kingdom: teaming up with Alfonso in 1071, Sancho marched across León to conquer García's northern lands at the time that Alfonso was in the southern part of the Galician realm issuing charters. García fled to exile in the Taifa of Seville, while his older brothers partitioned the Kingdom of Galicia between them.

Sancho soon turned on Alfonso. In 1072, with the aid of his alférez El Cid, at the Battle of Golpejera, he defeated Alfonso, who fled into exile in the Taifa of Toledo. Sancho was crowned King of León on 12 January 1072, holding all three crowns that Ferdinand had distributed to his sons only six years earlier. Toro, the city of Sancho's sister Elvira, fell easily in 1072. Sancho was stalled in a siege of his sister Urraca's better-defended city, Zamora.

=== Death ===
A Zamoran noble, Vellido Adolfo (also known as Bellido Dolfos), entered Sancho's camp pretending to be a deserter and assassinated him. Vellido was chased back to Zamora by El Cid, but escaped into the town through a gate since called Portillo del Traidor ("Traitor's Gate"). Sancho was succeeded in his kingdoms by the brother he had previously deposed, Alfonso. García, induced to return from exile, was deceived by Alfonso and imprisoned for life, leaving Alfonso in uncontested control of the reunited territories of their father, later taking on their father's title "Emperor of all Spain". Sancho was buried in San Salvador de Oña.

== Sources ==
- Medieval Iberia: An Encyclopedia: An Encyclopedia, ed. E. Michael Gerli, Routledge, 2003.
- Milo Kearney and Manuel Medrano, Medieval Culture and the Mexican American Borderlands, Texas A&M University Press, 2001.
- Bernard F. Reilly, 1988. The Kingdom of León-Castilla under King Alfonso VI, 1065–1109. Princeton: Princeton University Press.
- Bernard F. Reilly, The Contest of Christian and Muslim Spain, 1031-1157, Blackwell Publishing Ltd., 1995.
- Jaime de Salazar y Acha, 1992–1993. "Contribución al estudio del reinado de Alfonso VI de Castilla: algunas aclaraciones sobre su política matrimonial", Anales de la Real Academia Matritense de Heráldica y Genealogía, vol. 2, pp. 299–336.

Sancho II of Castile and León House of Jiménez Born: circa 1036/38 Died: 7 October 1072
Regnal titles
Preceded by Ferdinand I	King of Castile; 1065–1072	Succeeded by Alfonso VI
Preceded by García II	King of Galicia; 1071–1072 with Alfonso VI	Succeeded by Alfonso VI
Preceded by Alfonso VI	King of León; 1072	Succeeded by Alfonso VI
