= San Isidoro, León =

Church in León, Spain

Coordinates: 42.601°N 5.571°W

St. Isidore's Basilica
- Real Colegiata Basílica de San Isidoro
- Basílica de San Isidoro
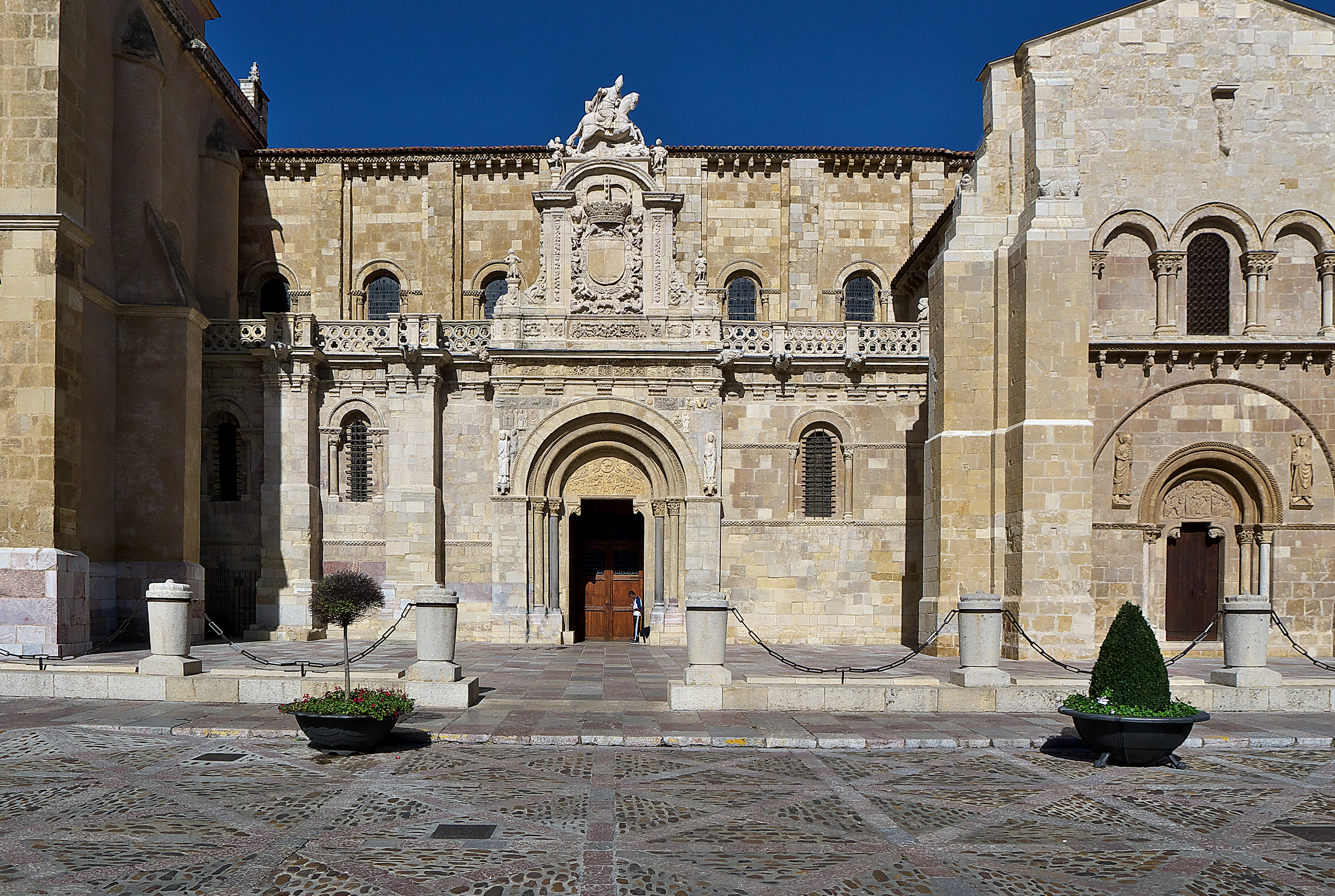
- South façade
- St. Isidore's Basilica
- Location: León, Castile and León
- Country: Spain
- Denomination: Catholic Church

History
- Status: Minor basilica
- Founded: 10th century
- Dedication: Isidore of Seville

Architecture
- Style: Romanesque
- Years built: 11th–12th century

Administration
- Archdiocese: Oviedo
- Diocese: León

St. Isidore's Basilica (Spanish: Basílica de San Isidoro) is a Catholic church in the city of León, Castile and León, Spain, located on the site of an ancient Roman temple. Its Christian roots can be traced back to the early 10th century when a monastery for Saint John the Baptist was erected on the grounds.

In 1063 the basilica was rededicated to Saint Isidore of Seville. Isidore was archbishop of Seville, and the most celebrated academic and theologian of Visigothic Spain in the period preceding the Arab invasions. With the agreement of Abbad II al-Mu'tadid, the Muslim ruler of Seville, Isidore's relics were brought to Leon where they could be interred on Christian soil. The tomb of the saint still draws many visitors today. An equestrian statue of Saint Isidore dressed as a Moor-slayer is visible, along with many other sculptures, high on the facade.

In 1188, the Cortes of León were held in here. It was the first sample of modern parliamentarism in the history of Europe, according to the UNESCO and John Keane's book The Life and Death of Democracy.

== History ==
The original church was built in the pre-Arab period over the ruins of a temple to the Roman god Mercury. In the 10th century, the kings of León established a community of Benedictine sisters on the site.

Following the conquest of the area by Al-Mansur Ibn Abi Aamir (938–1002), the first church was destroyed and the area devastated. León was repopulated and a new church and monastery established in the 11th century by Alfonso V of León.

Alfonso's daughter, the infanta Sancha of León, married Ferdinand, Count of Castile. Sancha's brother, Bermudo III, declared the war against Castile and Castilian troops, with the help of Navarre, killed the Leonese king, becoming Ferdinand I of León. He and his queen gave the crucifix that bears their name to San Isidoro. The church also benefited from its position on the famous pilgrimage route to Santiago de Compostela. Sculptors, stonemasons and artists from across Europe gathered to work on the monastery.

The church was rebuilt as a basilica and rededicated by Ferdinand I and Sancha in 1063. They renamed it San Isidoro in honor of St. Isidore, whose remains were transported to León.

Queen Sancha chose the new monastery as the site of the royal burial chapel. Today eleven kings, numerous queens and many nobles lie interred beneath the polychrome vaults of the medieval "royal pantheon". In 1063 the relics of Saint Isidore were transferred to the chapel, and a community of canons was established to maintain the monastery and ward the relics. The apse and transept of the building are in the Gothic style, whilst other parts of the building are Romanesque or of the Renaissance period.

In 1072, after the death of Sancho, Urraca of Zamora summoned her brother Alfonso VI from exile and reinstalled him as king. Together they planned an enlarged basilica, although the contemporary claims about the specifics of this amplification of the basilica may not be accurate.

The basilica is still a collegiate foundation and the canons' office is celebrated each day.

== Description ==
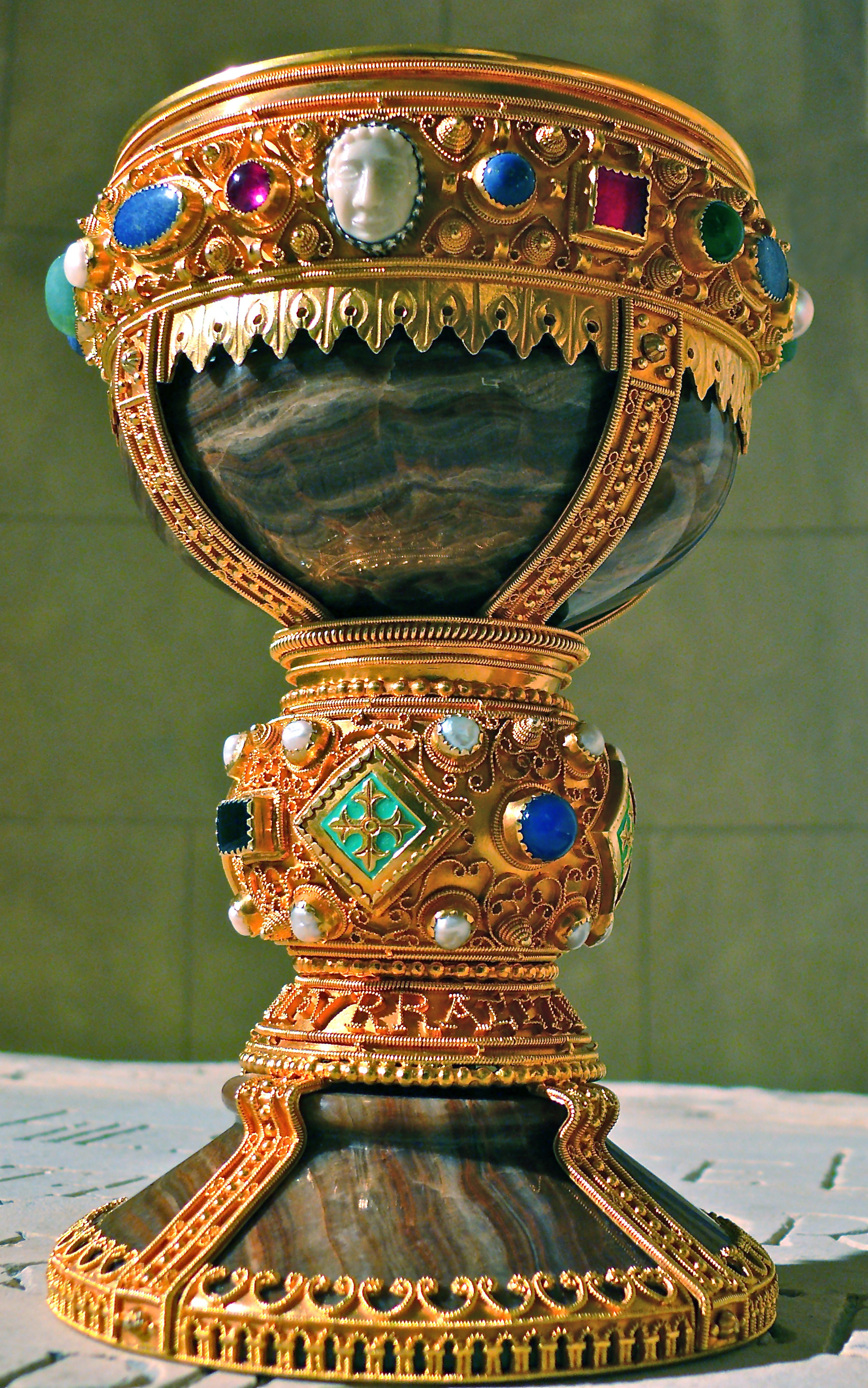
The Chalice of Doña Urraca in the Basilica's museum.

=== Basilica ===
Built mostly in the Romanesque style, the basilica has had major additions in the styles of many succeeding centuries including the Gothic. The arches on the crossing of the transept hark back to Islamic art. However the many styles merge into a harmonious whole.

The carved tympanum of the Puerta del Cordero is one of the basilica's most notable features. Created prior to 1100, this romanesque tympanum depicts the sacrifice of Abraham.

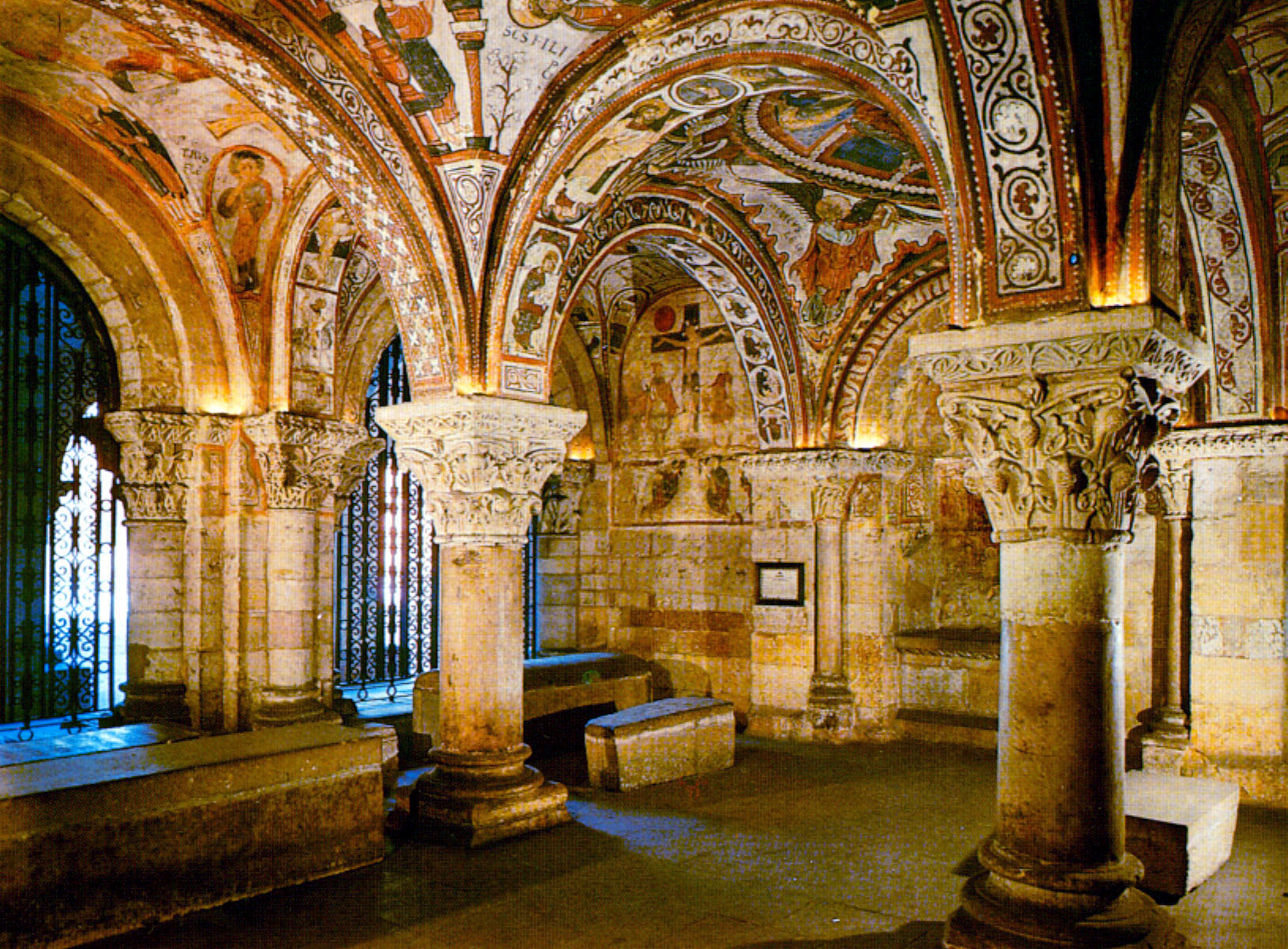
The Royal Pantheon

=== Royal Pantheon ===
Or the Pantheon of the Kings of León. This funeral chapel of the kings of León is one of the examples of surviving Romanesque art in León. The columns are crowned with rare Visigothic capitals, with floral or historic designs. The 12th century painted murals are in an exceptional state of preservation and consist of an ensemble of New Testament subjects along with scenes of contemporary rural life.

=== Museum ===
This contains numerous examples of early medieval art including jewelled chalices and works of ivory and precious metal. The library holds 300 medieval works, numerous manuscripts as well as mozarabic bible dating from 960 and a Latin version transcribed in the seventh century. There is also a text of the seventh century law code of the Visigothic rulers of pre-conquest Spain. The Chalice of Doña Urraca is one of the most important pieces in this Museum.

== Gallery ==
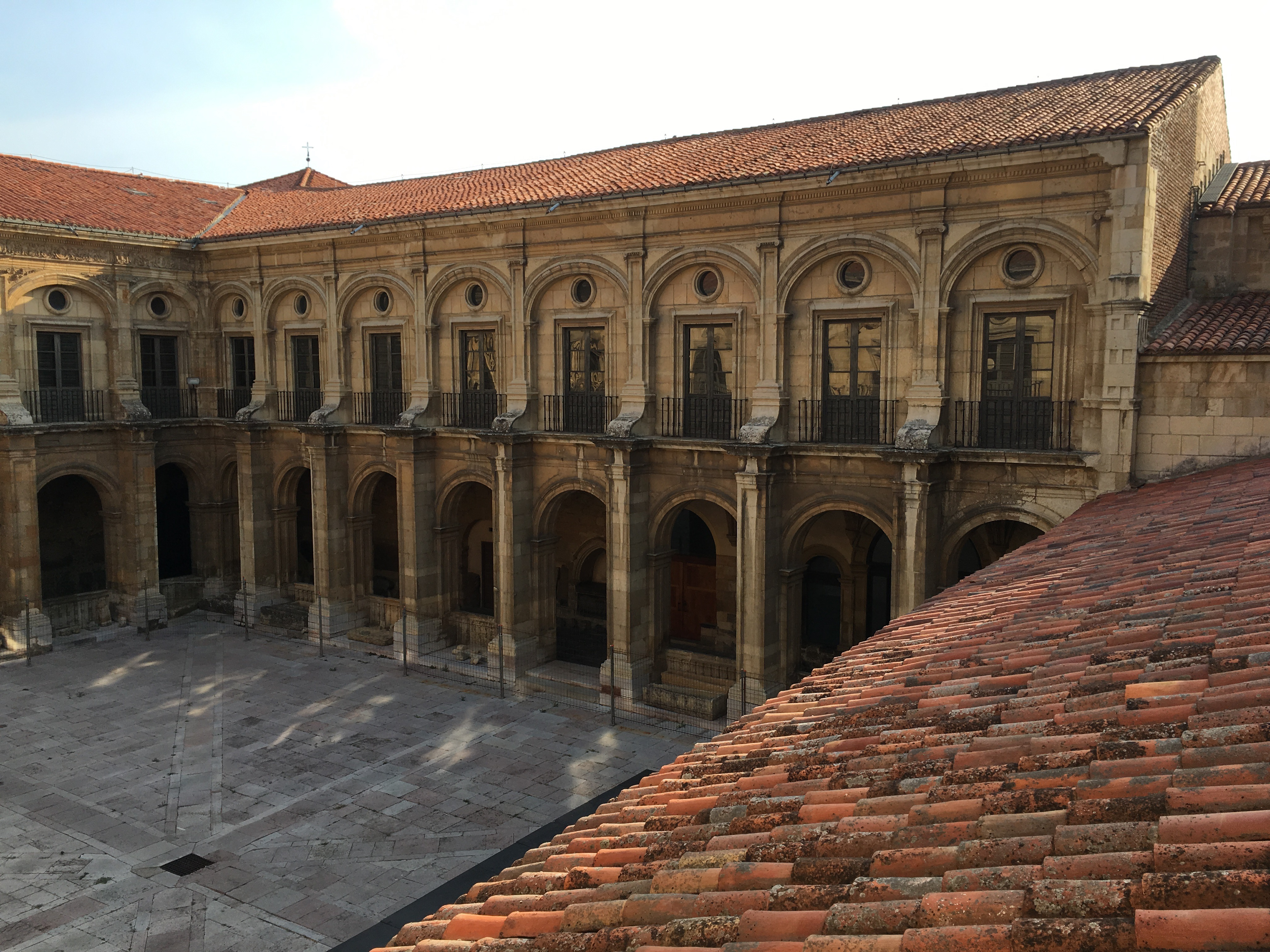
Cloisters

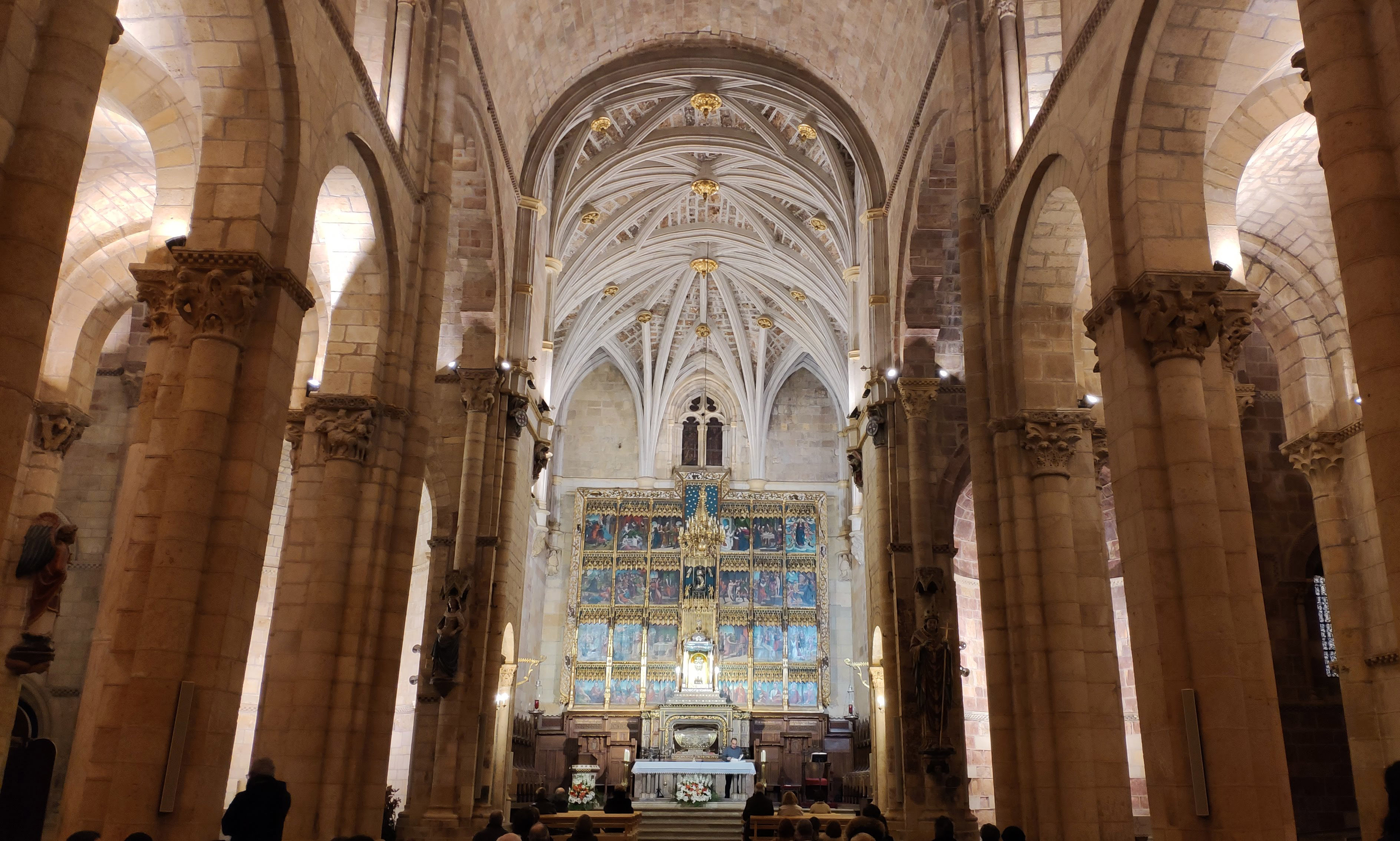
Interior

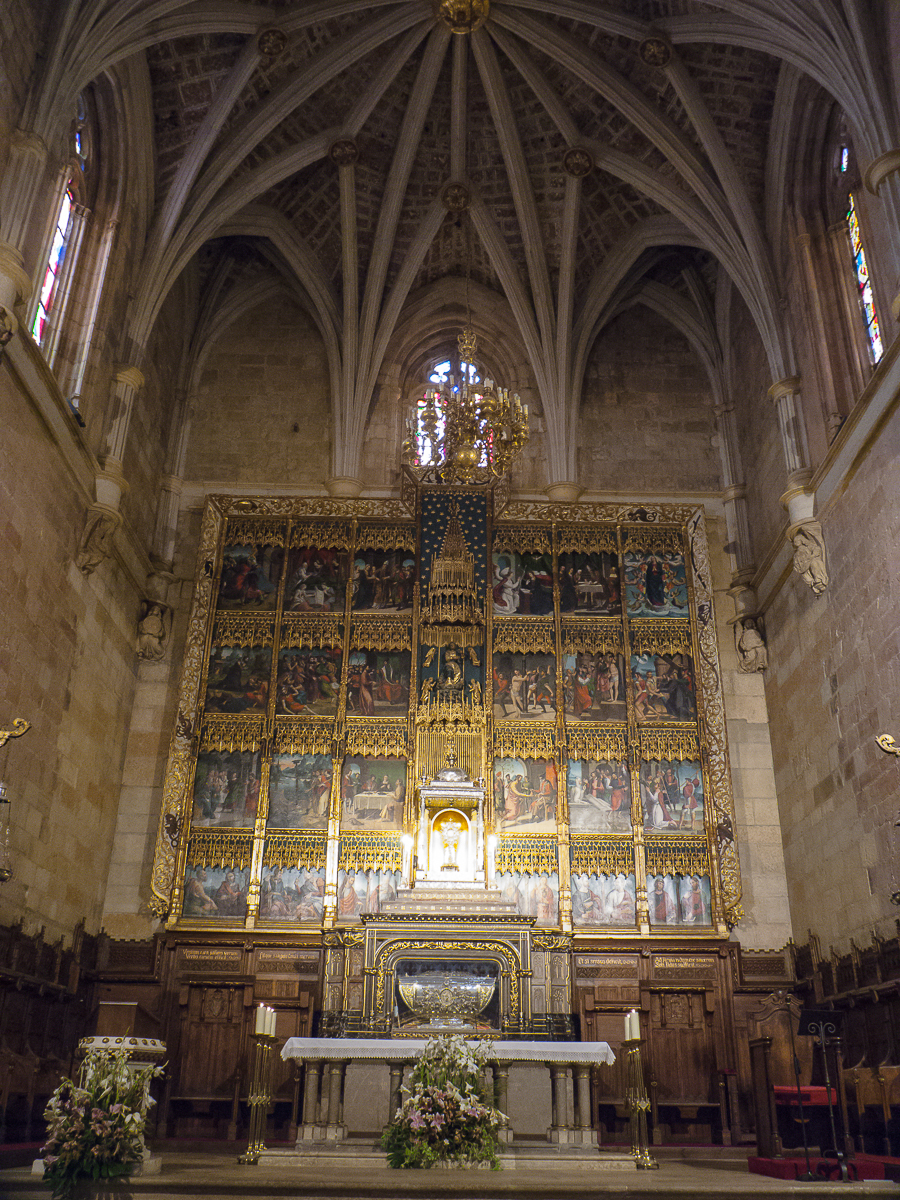
Main altar

== Bibliography ==
- Caldwell, Susan Havens (1986). "Urraca of Zamora and San Isidoro in León: Fulfillment of a Legacy". Woman's Art Journal. 7 (1): 19–25. doi:10.2307/1358232. JSTOR 1358232.
