= Urraca of Zamora =

Leonese noblewoman

Urraca
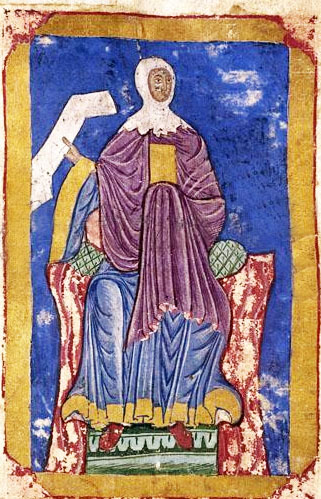
- Dynasty: Jiménez
- Father: Ferdinand I of León
- Mother: Sancha of León

Urraca of Zamora (1033/34 – 1101/03) (67 – 71 years old) was a Leonese infanta, one of the five children of Ferdinand I the Great, who received the city of Zamora as her inheritance and exercised palatine authority in it. Her story was romanticized in the cantar de gesta called the Cantar de Mio Cid, and Robert Southey's Chronicle of the Cid. Urraca's mother was Sancha of León.

== Succession dispute ==
Born in 1033/34, Urraca was the daughter of Ferdinand I of León and Sancha of León. Before his death in 1065, Ferdinand divided his widespread conquests in central Spain between his five children, charging them to live at peace with one another. Ferdinand's oldest son, Sancho II, received Castile and the tribute from Zaragoza; Alfonso VI received León and the tribute from Toledo; and García II received Galicia. His daughters, Elvira and Urraca, received Toro and Zamora, respectively.

Sancho, however, resolved to rule over his father's entire kingdom and made war on his siblings. By 1072, Sancho had overthrown his youngest brother Garcia, and forced his other brother Alfonso to flee to his Moorish vassal city of Toledo. Toro, the city of Sancho's sister Elvira, fell easily. But in a siege of Urraca's better-defended city of Zamora, King Sancho was stalled, and was then mysteriously assassinated on 7 October 1072. It was widely suspected that the assassination was a result of a pact between Alfonso and Urraca. The Chronicle of the Cid, purportedly written by one of the Cid's followers, states that the assassin was a nobleman of Zamora, who then received sanctuary in the city. The chronicle is careful not to place any direct blame on Alfonso or Urraca, just as it takes pains to stress that the participation of the Cid at the siege of Zamora was involuntary and supposedly forced on him by King Sancho.

== Alfonso's reign ==
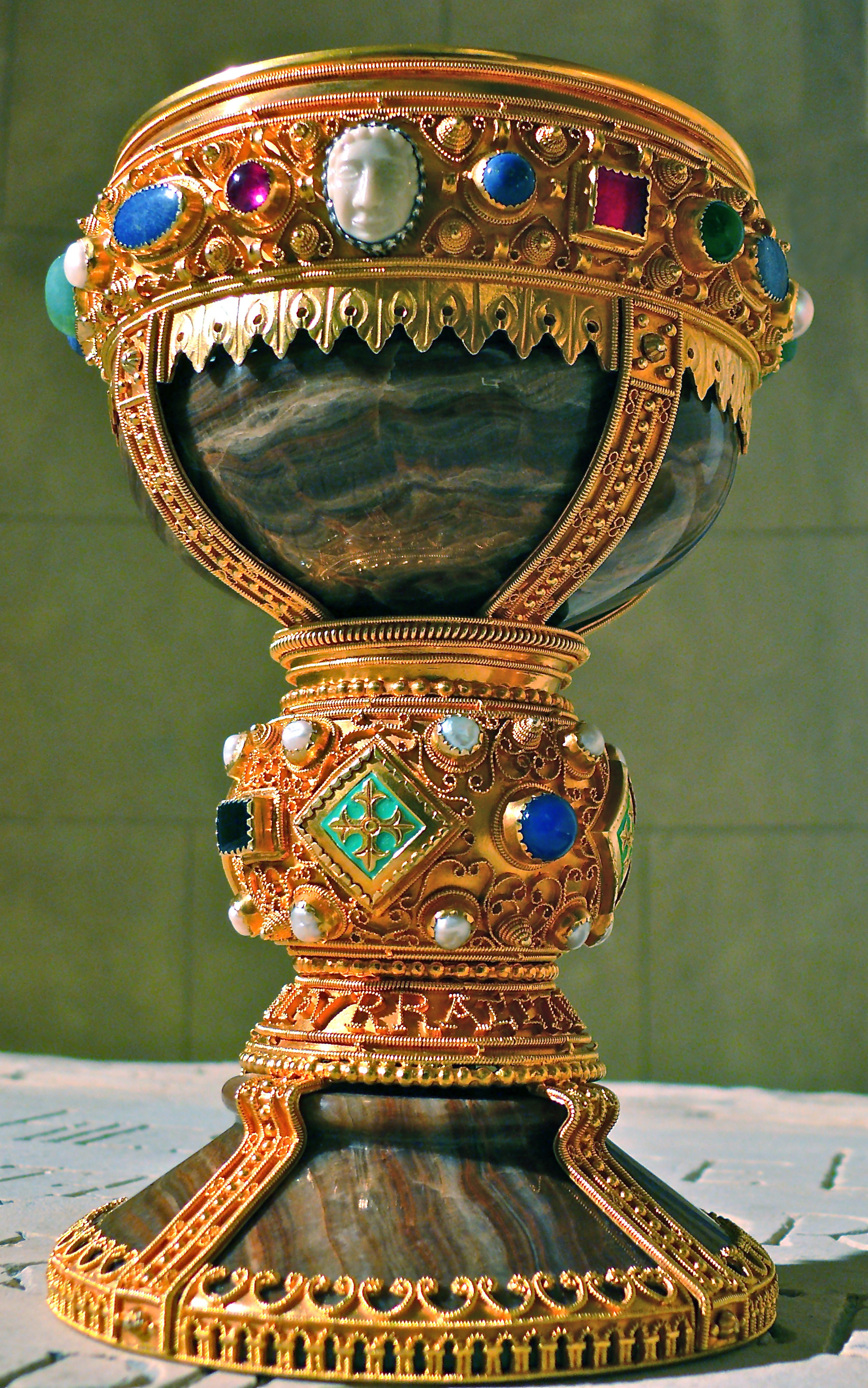
The twelfth-century Chalice of Doña Urraca, donated by Urraca to St. Isidore's Basilica, León.

According to the chronicle, the guilt of Zamora was decided by a trial by combat, which proved inconclusive. Urraca sent summons to the nobles of Sancho's dominions, and Alfonso was grudgingly acknowledged as heir to both Castile and León. Led by the Cid and a dozen "oath-helpers", the nobles forced Alfonso to swear to his innocence publicly.

== Burial ==
Urraca is buried in St. Isidore's Basilica, León.

== Sources ==
- Jansen, S. (2002). The Monstrous Regiment of Women: Female Rulers in Early Modern Europe. Palgrave Macmillan. ISBN 9780230602113.
- Walker, Rose (2018). "Agency and the re-invention of slab relief sculpture at San Isidoro de Leon c.1100". In McNeill, John; Camps, Jordi; Castiñeiras, Manuel; Plant, Richard (eds.). Romanesque Patrons and Processes: Design and Instrumentality in the Art and Architecture of Romanesque Europe. Routledge. pp. 235–250. ISBN 9781351105583.
- Del Arco y Garay, Ricardo. Instituto Jerónimo Zurita. Consejo Superior de Investigaciones Científicas.. ed. Sepulcros de la Casa Real de Castilla. Madrid. OCLC 11366237.
- Blanco Lozano, Pilar. Colección diplomática de Fernando I (1037–1065). León: Centro de Estudios e Investigación «San Isidoro» (CSIC-CECEL) y Archivo Histórico Diocesano, 1987. ISBN 84-00-06653-7.
- Martínez Díez, Gonzalo. El Condado de Castilla (711–1065). La Historia frente a la leyenda. Valladolid, Junta de Castilla y León, 2004. ISBN 978-84-9718-275-1.
- Sánchez Candeira, Alfonso. Castilla y León en el siglo XI. Estudio del reinado de Fernando I. Madrid: Real Academia de la Historia, 1999. 349 p. ISBN 84-89512-41-8.
- Viñayo González, Antonio. Fernando I, el Magno (1035–1065). Burgos: La Olmeda, 1999. 309 p. ISBN 84-89915-10-5.
