= Ferdinand I of León =

King of León from 1037 to 1065

Ferdinand I
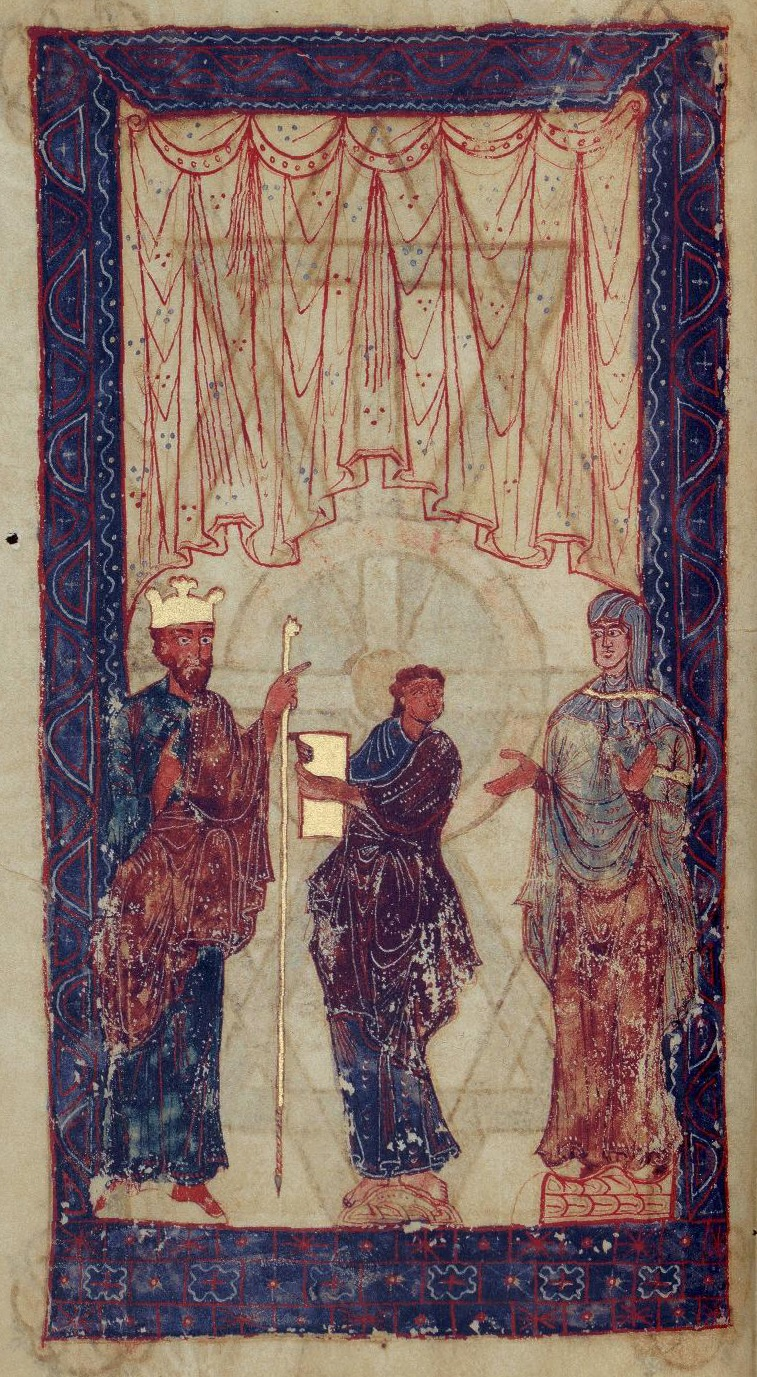
- Ferdinand (left) and his wife Sancha (right) receive a book of hours from its scribe. From an illumination in a contemporary book of hours.

King of León
- Reign: 1037–1065
- Coronation: 22 June 1038 (León)
- Predecessor: Bermudo III
- Successor: Alfonso VI (León); García II (Galicia)

Count of Castile
- Reign: 1029–1065
- Predecessor: García II
- Successor: Sancho II (as King)
- Born: c. 1015
- Died: 24 December 1065 (aged 49–50); León
- Burial: Basilica of San Isidoro
- Consort: Sancha of León
- Issue: Urraca, Lady of Zamora; Sancho II of Castile; Elvira, Lady of Toro; Alfonso VI of León; García II of Galicia
- Dynasty: Jiménez
- Father: Sancho III of Navarre
- Mother: Muniadona of Castile
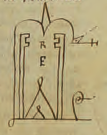
- Signature

Ferdinand I (c. 1015 – 24 December 1065), called the Great (el Magno), was the count of Castile from his uncle's death in 1029 and the king of León after defeating his brother-in-law in 1037. According to tradition, he was the first to have himself crowned Emperor of Spain (1056), and his heirs carried on the tradition. He was a younger son of Sancho III of Pamplona and Muniadona of Castile, and by his father's will recognised the supremacy of his eldest brother, García Sánchez III of Navarre. While Ferdinand inaugurated the rule of the Navarrese Jiménez dynasty over western Spain, his rise to preeminence among the Christian rulers of the peninsula shifted the focus of power and culture westward after more than a century of Leonese decline. Nevertheless, "[t]he internal consolidation of the realm of León–Castilla under Fernando el Magno and [his queen] Sancha (1037–1065) is a history that remains to be researched and written."

== Date and order of birth ==
There is some disagreement concerning the order of birth of Sancho III's sons, and of Ferdinand's place among them. He was certainly a younger son, and he was probably born later than 1011, by which date his parents are known to have married. Most, and the most reliable, charters name Sancho's sons in the order Ramiro, García, Gonzalo, then Ferdinand. Three documents from the Cathedral of Pamplona list them in this way, as well as four from the monastery of San Juan de la Peña. One charter from Pamplona, dated 29 September 1023, is witnessed by Sancho's mother, Jimena Fernández, his wife Muniadona, her children, listed García, Ferdinand then Gonzalo, and their brother, the illegitimate Ramiro.

In five documents of the monastery of San Salvador de Leire, Ferdinand is listed after Gonzalo. Two of these are dated to 17 April 1014. If authentic, they place Ferdinand's birth before that date. Three further documents from Leire are among the only ones to place Ferdinand second among the legitimate sons, but they suffer from various anachronisms and interpolations. Two preserved diplomas of Santa María la Real de Irache also put Gonzalo ahead of him. On the basis of these documents, Gonzalo Martínez Díez places Ferdinand third of the known legitimate sons of Sancho III (Ramiro being a bastard born before Sancho's marriage to Muniadona), and his birth no earlier than 1015. The Crónica de Alaón renovada, which Martínez Díez dates to 1154, but which other scholars dismiss as a late medieval concoction, lists García, Ferdinand and Gonzalo as Sancho III's sons by Muniadona in that order, but in the same passage mistakenly places Gonzalo's death before his father's.

== Count of Castile (1029–37) ==
Ferdinand was barely in his teens when García Sánchez, Count of Castile, was assassinated by a party of exiled Castilian noblemen as he was entering the church of John the Baptist in León, where he had gone to marry Sancha, sister of Bermudo III, King of León. In his role as feudal overlord, Sancho III of Navarre nominated his younger son Ferdinand, born to the deceased count's sister Muniadona, as count of Castile. Although Sancho was recognised as the ruler of Castile until his death, Ferdinand was granted the title "count" (comes) and was prepared to succeed in Castile. On 7 July 1029, before a council in Burgos, the capital of Castile, Óneca, aunt of the late García and queen Muniadona, formally adopted Sancho and Muniadona, making them her heirs. The record of the council is the first recorded instance of Ferdinand bearing the title of count. A later charter from the monastery of San Pedro de Cardeña, dated 1 January 1030, explicitly lists Sancho as king in León (the overlord of Castile) and Ferdinand as count in Castile. The first indication that Ferdinand was independently reigning over Castile, or was at least recognised as count in his own right, is a charter of 1 November 1032 from the monastery of San Pedro de Arlanza, which does not mention his father, but dates it to the time of "Fernando Sánchez bearing the county". Sancho's decision to name his son as count in Castile preserved its high degree of autonomy, although no Castilian document after 1028 is dated by the reign of Bermudo III nor is he ever named as king of León. The only sovereign whose regnal year was used was Sancho III, making Ferdinand the first count of Castile not to recognise the suzerainty of the king of León.

Sancho III arranged for Ferdinand to marry García of Castile's intended bride, Sancha of León, in 1032. The lands between the Cea and Pisuerga rivers went to Castile as her dowry. After his father's death on 18 October 1035, Ferdinand continued to rule in Castile, but he was not, as many later authors have it, king of Castile. Contemporary documents stress his status as count and his relationship of vassalage to the king of León. A document issued by his brother Ramiro on 22 August 1036 at San Juan de la Peña was drawn while "emperor Bermudo [was] reigning in León and count Ferdinand in Castile, king García in Pamplona, king Ramiro in Aragon, and king Gonzalo in Ribagorza." Two private Castilian documents dated 1 January 1037 both express Ferdinand's continuing vassalage to the Leonese monarch explicitly, dating themselves by the reign of "king Bermudo and Ferdinand, count in his realms".

In a dispute over the territory between the Cea and Pisuerga, Ferdinand, nominally a vassal of Bermudo III, defeated and killed his suzerain at the Battle of Tamarón on 4 September 1037. Ferdinand took possession of León by right of his wife, and on 22 June 1038 had himself crowned and anointed king in León.

== King of León (1037–65) ==
=== Relations with Navarre ===
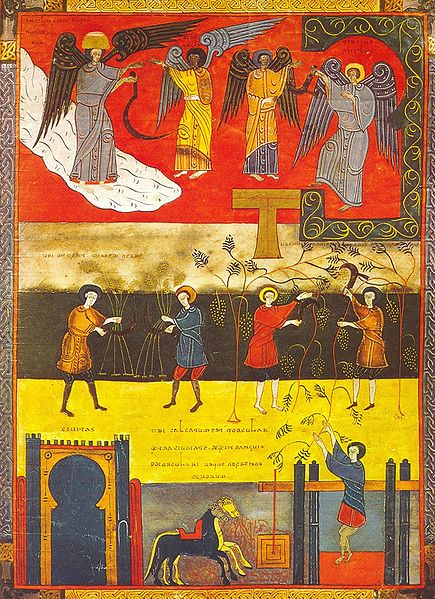
"Harvest of grain and grapes", from the Beatus de Facundus, commissioned by Ferdinand and Sancha, circa 1047

On 15 September 1054, Ferdinand defeated his elder brother García at the Battle of Atapuerca and reduced Navarre to a vassal state under his late brother's young son, Sancho García IV. Although Navarre at that time included the traditionally Castilian lands of Álava and La Rioja, Ferdinand demanded the cession only of Bureba. Over the next decade, he gradually extended his control over more of the western territory of Navarre at the expense of Sancho IV, although this was accomplished peacefully and is only detectable in the documentary record.

=== Relations with al-Andalus ===
==== War with Zaragoza ====
In 1060, according to the Historia silense, Ferdinand invaded the taifa of Zaragoza through the upland valley of the eastern Duero in the highlands around Soria. He captured the fortresses of San Esteban de Gormaz, Berlanga and Vadorrey, and afterwards proceeded through Santiuste, Huermeces and Santamara as far as the Roman road that lay between Toledo and Zaragoza. The success of the campaign was made possible by the preoccupation of the Zaragozan emir, Ahmad al-Muqtadir, with attacking the neighboring taifa of Tortosa and defending his northeastern frontier from Ramiro I of Aragon and Raymond Berengar I of Barcelona. The emir, up until then paying tribute to Sancho IV of Navarre, submitted to Ferdinand and agreed to pay parias. Although probably originally meant to be temporary, Ferdinand managed to enforce the tribute until his death.

==== War with Toledo ====
With al-Muqtadir sidelined as a threat, Ferdinand turned his attention to Yahya ibn Ismail al-Mamun, emir of Toledo. It is probable that Ferdinand already maintained close relations with the Toledan court, and was perhaps protector of the Mozarabic Christian community in Toledo. In 1058, the last known Mozarabic bishop of Toledo, Pascual, was consecrated in León. In 1062, Ferdinand invaded the east of al-Mamun's taifa, taking Talamanca and besieging Alcalá de Henares. After seeing his country plundered, al-Mamun agreed to pay parias and Ferdinand left.

==== Great raid on Badajoz and Seville ====
In 1063, using the new income from his parias, Ferdinand organised a "great raid, or razzia" into the taifas of Seville and Badajoz. Seville, and probably Badajoz also, paid a ransom for his withdrawal. This attack was probably also designed to remove Badajoz as a threat during his siege of Coimbra the next year.

==== Reconquests in Portugal ====
Although the sources are unclear, it is possible that as early as 1055 Ferdinand attacked the taifa of Badajoz. His first serious campaign of Reconquista was an invasion of the lower basin of the Duero between the coast, which had long been held by León, and the mountains. On 29 November 1057 his army conquered Lamego and its valleys. Having secured the Duero, Ferdinand began to bring the valley of the Mondego under his control, first taking Viseu in its middle stretch on 25 July 1058 and then moving down towards the sea. It was "a long and grueling battle" before Coimbra, at the mouth of the Mondego, was taken on 25 July 1064 after a six-month siege.

==== War with Valencia ====
In 1065, Ferdinand embarked on his last military campaign. He invaded the taifa of Valencia and laid siege to the city itself but did not have the forces to take the city. During the retreat from the city he ambushed and defeated the pursuing forces of the emir Abd al-Malik ibn Abd al-Aziz al-Muẓaffar late in the autumn at the Battle of Paterna. The emir's father-in-law, al-Mamun of Toledo, seized control of Valencia, and the frightened emir of Zaragoza renewed his tribute payments to León. Ferdinand fell ill in November and returned to his kingdom.

== Emperor of Spain ==
Ferdinand was first titled "emperor" not by himself or his own scribes, but by the notaries of his half-brother, the petty king Ramiro I of Aragon, whose notaries were also calling Ferdinand's predecessor as king of León by the same title. In a royal Aragonese charter of 1036, before the Battle of Tamarón, Ramiro refers to his brother as "emperor in Castile and in León and in Astorga". A similarly worded charter was issued in 1041 and again in 1061, where the order of kingdoms is reversed and Astorga ignored: "emperor in León and in Castile". The first use of the imperial style in a charter of his own, preserved in the cartulary of Arlanza, dates to the year 1056: "under the rule of the emperor King Ferdinand and the empress Queen Sancha ruling the kingdom in León and in Galicia as well as in Castile". On this basis, Ferdinand is sometimes said to have had himself crowned emperor in 1056.

The imperial title was only used on one other occasion during his reign. A document of 1058 dates itself "in the time of the most serene prince Lord Ferdinand and his consort Queen Sancha" and later qualifies him as "this emperor, the aforesaid Ferdinand".

== Death and succession ==
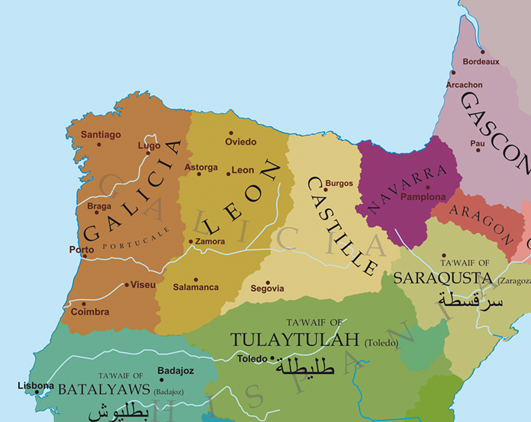
Political situation in the Northern Iberian Peninsula around 1065: Garcia II´s domains (Galicia) Badajoz, owing tribute to Garcia Seville, owing tribute to Garcia Alfonso VI´s domains (León) Toledo, owing tribute to Alfonso Sancho II´s domains (Castile) Zaragoza, owing tribute to Sancho

After becoming ill during the Siege of Valencia and the Battle of Paterna, Ferdinand died on 24 December 1065, in León, with many manifestations of ardent piety, having laid aside his crown and royal mantle, dressed in the robe of a monk and lying on a bier covered with ashes, which was placed before the altar of the Basilica of San Isidoro. By his will, Ferdinand divided his kingdom among his three sons: the eldest, Sancho, received Castile; the second, Alfonso, León; and from the latter the region of Galicia was carved off to create a separate state for García. Ferdinand's two daughters each received cities: Elvira that of Toro and Urraca that of Zamora. In giving them these territories, he expressed his desire that they respect his wishes and abide by the split. However, soon after Fernando's death, Sancho and Alfonso turned on García and defeated him. They then fought each other, the victorious Sancho reuniting their father's possessions under his control in 1072. However, Sancho was killed that same year and the territories passed to Alfonso.

== Posthumous reputation ==
The Chronicon complutense, probably written shortly after Ferdinand's death, extols him as the "exceedingly strong emperor" (imperator fortissimus) when mentioning the siege of Coimbra. After his death, Ferdinand's children took to calling him "emperor" and "the great" (magnus). In 1072, Alfonso, Fedinand's second son, referred to himself as "offspring of the Emperor Ferdinand". Two years later (1074), Urraca and Elvira referred to themselves as "daughters of the Emperor Ferdinand the Great [or, the great emperor Ferdinand]". In a later charter of 1087, Ferdinand is referred to first as "king", then as "great emperor", and finally just as "emperor" alongside his consort, who is first called "queen" then "empress".

In the fourteenth century a legend appeared in various chronicles according to which the pope, the Holy Roman emperor, and the king of France demanded a tribute from Ferdinand. In certain versions the pope is named Urban (although it could not have been either Urban I or Urban II) and in other versions Victor (which is plausibly identifiable with Victor II). Ferdinand was prepared to pay, but one of his vassals, later known as El Cid, who in reality was a youth during Ferdinand's reign, declared a war on the pope, the emperor and the Frank, and the latter rescinded their demand. For this reason "Don Fernando was afterwards called ‘the Great’: the peer of an emperor". In the sixteenth century this account re-appeared, extended and elaborated, by Juan de Mariana, who wrote that in 1055, at a synod in Florence, the Emperor Henry III urged Victor II to prohibit under severe penalties the use of the imperial title by Ferdinand of León.

This story is generally regarded as apocryphal, although some modern authors have accepted it uncritically or seen a kernel of historical truth in it. Spanish historian A. Ballesteros argued that Ferdinand adopted the title in opposition to Henry III's imperial pretensions. German historian E. E. Stengel believed the version found in Mariana on the grounds that the latter probably used the now lost acts of the Council of Florence. Juan Beneyto Pérez was willing to accept it as based on tradition and Ernst Steindorff, the nineteenth-century student of the reign of Henry III, as being authentically transmitted via the romancero. Menéndez Pidal accepted the account of Mariana, but placed it in the year 1065.

== Family tree ==
Sancha of Aybar	Sancho III of Pamplona	Muniadomna of Castile	Alfonso V of León
Ramiro I of Aragon	García Sánchez III of Pamplona	Gonzalo of Sobrarbe and Ribagorza	Ferdinand I of Castile & León	Sancha of León	García Sánchez of Castile	Bermudo III of León	Jimena of Pamplona
Urraca of Zamora	Sancho II of Castile	Elvira of Toro	Alfonso VI of León	García II of Galicia

== Bibliography ==
- García Gallo, Alfonso (1945). "El imperio medieval español". Arbor (in Spanish) (4). Reprinted in “Historia de España”, Florentino Pérez Embid, ed. (Madrid: 1953). Madrid: 199–228. ISSN 0210-1963.
- López Ortiz, Jose (1942). "Las ideas imperiales en el medioevo". Revista Escorial (in Spanish) (6). Madrid: 43–70. OCLC 6192204.
- Martínez Díez, Gonzalo (2007). Sancho III el Mayor Rey de Pamplona, Rex Ibericus (in Spanish). Madrid: Marcial Pons Historia. ISBN 978-84-96467-47-7.
- Martínez Díez, Gonzalo (2005). El Condado de Castilla (711-1038): la historia frente a la leyenda (in Spanish). 2 volumes. Valladolid: Junta de Castilla y León, Consejería de Cultura y Turismo. ISBN 84-9718-275-8.
- Pérez de Urbel, Justo (1954). "La división del reino por Sancho el Mayor". Hispania: Revista española de historia (in Spanish) (54). Madrid: CSIC: 3–26. ISSN 0018-2141.
- Menéndez Pidal, Ramón (1929). La España del Cid (in Spanish). Madrid: Editorial Plutarco. OCLC 1413407.
- Reilly, Bernard F. (1988). The Kingdom of León-Castilla under King Alfonso VI, 1065–1109. Princeton: Princeton University Press.
- Sánchez Candeira, Alfonso (1999). Rosa Montero Tejada (ed.). Castilla y León en el siglo XI, estudio del reinado de Fernando I (in Spanish). Madrid: Real Academia de la Historia. ISBN 978-84-8951241-2.
- Torres Sevilla-Quiñones de León, Margarita Cecilia (2000–2002). "El linaje del Cid" (PDF). Anales de la Universidad de Alicante. Historia Medieval (in Spanish) (13): 343–360. ISSN 0212-2480. Archived from the original (PDF) on 2013-10-17.

Ferdinand I of León House of Jiménez Born: circa 1015 Died: 24 December 1065
Regnal titles
Preceded by García II	Count of Castile; 1029–1065	Succeeded by Sancho II as King of Castile
Preceded by Bermudo III	King of León; 1037–1065	Succeeded by Alfonso VI as King of León
Preceded by Bermudo III	King of León; 1037–1065	Succeeded by García II as King of Galicia
Vacant Title last held by Sancho III of Pamplona	— TITULAR — Emperor of All Spain; 1056–1065	Vacant Title next held by Alfonso VI
