= García Ordóñez =

Castilian magnate

García Ordóñez (died 29 May 1108), called de Nájera or de Cabra and Crispus or el Crespo de Grañón in the epic literature, was a Castilian magnate who ruled the Rioja, with his seat at Nájera, from 1080 until his death. He is famous in literature as the rival of Rodrigo Díaz de Vivar, the Cid, whose high position at court he took over after the Cid's exile in 1080. He was one of the most important military leaders and territorial governors under Alfonso VI, and was entrusted with military tutorship of the king's heir, Sancho Alfónsez, with whom he died on the field of battle at Uclés.

== Family and marriages ==
García was the son of a count Ordoño Ordóñez whose identity is disputed. Traditionally he was identified with a supposed son of infante Ordoño Ramírez and his wife infanta Cristina Bermúdez and hence grandson of two kings, Ramiro III and Bermudo II of León. However, that family's geographical base was in León, whereas García's was in Castile. Further, there is debate as to whether the infantes had such a son, his name being absent from the earliest documentation of their family. It has been suggested that instead the Castilian count Ordoño Ordóñez, García's father, was son of count Ordoño Fafílaz of the Banu Gómez clan. García's father can be shown from surviving documents to have served as alférez to Ferdinand I of León and Castile between 19 April 1042 and 1 July 1047. García's mother was named Enderquina, but her origins are unknown. He was also related, somehow, to Álvaro Díaz de Oca.

Before 1081, García married the infanta Urraca Garcés, a daughter of García Sánchez III of Navarre and sister of Sancho Garcés IV. The earliest reference to the marriage dates from 18 April that year, when the couple witnessed a donation of her brother Ramiro Garcés. Urraca gave García three children, two daughters (Elvira and Mayor) and a son Fernando, speculated to be identical to Fernando García de Hita, progenitor of the House of Castro. A charter issued by Mayor in 1145 traces her royal ancestry.

Sometime after the death of his first wife (after 1095), García married again, this time to a certain Eva, long identified as a daughter of Pedro Fróilaz de Traba, although there is no documentary evidence that he had such a daughter. More probably she was from north of the Pyrenees, perhaps the daughter of Aimery IV, viscount of Rochechouart, one of the French barons who had answered Alfonso VI's international call for aid against the Almoravids following the Battle of Sagrajas (1086), or of Hugh II, Count of Empúries and his wife Sancha de Urgell. Eva had one son by García: García Garcés de Aza, ancestor of the House of Aza, whose christening took place in 1106 according to the cartulary of the monastery of San Millán de la Cogolla. After García's death, Eva remarried to count Pedro González de Lara. García also had an illegitimate son named Fernando Pellica.

== Early career (1062–74) ==
García's public career began late in the reign of Ferdinand I, when he subscribed a charter of 10 May 1062, now in the cartulary of the monastery of Arlanza. During the reign of Ferdinand's successor in Castile, Sancho II, García was a figure on the rise. He subscribed three of the ten surviving royal charters of Sancho's reign, while his father confirmed five. During this time he was associated with Pancorvo in the northeast of the Bureba, along the Way of Saint James leading from Miranda del Ebro.

In 1072, Sancho II was assassinated, and his brother Alfonso VI succeeded him. On 8 December, Alfonso granted a charter to the monastery of San Pedro de Cardeña in Castile. Among the confirmants is García Ordóñez, who was thus among the first to reconcile himself to the new king. In 1074 García was appointed the king's alférez by 20 February, a post he continued in down to 24 June at least. Thereafter he disappears from court records until 1080.

== Outside of royal service (1074–80) ==
There is a false document dated 1075 by which Alfonso VI purportedly made a grant of privileges to Burgos, which lists García as a confirmant.

In 1079, García was dispatched to Granada to collect the parias (tribute) owed by that taifa to León–Castile. While there he led an army on behalf of Granada against the taifa of Seville. Among the other leaders on this campaign were two Navarrese magnates, Fortún Sánchez and Lope Sánchez, who had formerly been leading men in Navarre and in Castile under Sancho II. With this expedition Alfonso VI may have been intending to produce discord between the taifa kingdoms, furthering his hegemony in the south of the peninsula. Whatever the case, at the time of the attack, the Cid was leading a Castilian embassy to the court of al-Mutamid, ruler of Seville, and he repulsed the Christian and Grenadine attackers at the Battle of Cabra, in the (probably mistaken) belief that he was defending the king's tributary. García and the other Castilian leaders were taken captive and held for three days before being released. Bernard Reilly has read the circumstances as implying that García was then an exile who had taken refuge in the south of the peninsula.

By 1080, the positions of García and his rival the Cid in the eyes of Alfonso had been reversed. By May (or at least by 6 December 1081) Alfonso had placed the territory of La Rioja in his hands, with his chief seat at Nájera. To that same month is dated the last charter recording the presence of the Cid at Alfonso's court.

== Count of Nájera (1080–1108) ==
Sometime shortly after his return to court, García was raised to the rank of count (Latin: comes), the highest recognised rank in the kingdom before the 13th century and which meant a seat on the royal council, beside the granting of fiefs and other lands. The precise date of his promotion is unclear. The earliest dated reference to his carrying this title is the carta de arras of the Cid, but it is mis-dated to 10/19 July 1074, whereas it must date from between July 1078 and July 1081. The charter, redacted weeks after the last known reference to García as alférez, records Rodrigo González as alférez, although he is only known to have held that post between January 1078 and June 1081. There is a royal charter dated 1077 that refers to "García, count of Nájera" (Garsias comes de Nazara), but he is not known to have received the lordship of Nájera until 1081. The count being referred to is possibly García Jiménez de Oca. Another royal charter dated 8 May 1080 lists nineteen counts, among them García Ordóñez, but the list appears to be anachronistic, as Fernando Díaz, who was not made count until 1091, appears as Fernandus Didaz commes. Finally, there is a dubious royal charter from 3 December 1080 which was confirmed by one "Count García". The earliest secure reference to García as count is from 18 April 1081, also the first reference to his first wife, Urraca. Historian Ramón Menéndez Pidal argued that García was appointed count of Nájera in 1076, a contention not generally accepted today.

At the same time as his return to court, García thus received a vast fief comprising the erstwhile southern provinces of Navarre, promotion to the highest aristocratic title in the realm, and the hand in marriage of a Navarrese princess, presumably through Alfonso's actions, since the Navarrese royal family had fallen under his protection after the assassination of Sancho IV of Navarre in 1076. Also at this time, García's chief rival, the Cid, was forced into exile, and, by July 1081, García's brother, Rodrigo, had been appointed alférez to the king. It may be that the Lope Íñiguez who by 1081 had been granted all three of the Basque señoríos of Álava, Biscay, and Guipúzcoa was the same person as the Lop Jiménez who co-led the 1079 expedition against Seville. If so, then he is another ally of García Ordóñez who benefited from the latter's rise after his return to Castile.

In August 1084 García made a donation to the Benedictine monastery of San Adrián de Palma. By 20 November 1085, according to a document in the cartulary of San Millán, García's lordship was extended south to include Calahorra, an episcopal seat. By 1089 it was also included Grañón and by 1092 Madriz. At this time, corresponding to the alférez-ship of Pedro González de Lara from 1088 to 1091, García was the most prominent magnate in the kingdom and he frequently attended the royal court, confirming eleven charters out of a total of eighteen from these years, the most of any count. At about this time, however, Raymond of Burgundy, a newcomer to the kingdom, was married to the king's eldest daughter, Urraca, and he quickly surpassed García in power, although the latter still confirmed fifteen of twenty-seven royal diplomas of the period 1092–99, more than any other magnate.

In 1096, Peter I of Aragon and Navarre besieged Huesca, a city of the taifa of Zaragoza. In the late fall of 1096, the ruler of Zaragoza, al-Musta'in II, received assistance from his nominal overlord, Alfonso VI, in the persons of García Ordóñez de Nájera and Gonzalo Núñez de Lara. Alongside the Zaragozans, the Castilian counts led their personal retinues against the besiegers, but were defeated on 18 November in the Battle of Alcoraz. García also took part in the Battle of Consuegra on 15 August 1097. This campaign had begun as planned harassment of Aragon, perhaps a concerted action with Zaragoza to re-take Huesca, but it was diverted by the arrival of an Almoravid army in the south centre of the peninsula. The result was a Castilian–Leonese defeat. García's participation in court politics appears to have continued to decline after this. Of twenty-three royal charters issued between 1100 and 1107, a year before his death, he confirmed eleven, still a sizable portion, but now less than half.

On 1 February 1095 García and Urraca granted a fuero to the town of Fresnillo de las Dueñas. In 1106 García made a donation to San Millán.

== Tutorship of Sancho Alfónsez (1108) ==
According to the De rebus Hispaniae, Alfonso VI named García tutor for his only son, Sancho Alfónsez. On 29 May 1108, he took part in the Battle of Uclés, where he died defending the life of the young Sancho, who would die in the same battle shortly after. His death is recorded in the De rebus Hispaniae, the Chronicon mundi, and the Chronica naierensis, where the battle is dated to 24 June. The death of seven counts at Uclés led the Christians to refer to the site as Septem Comitem (Siete Condes), although García is the only count identified in the Chronica naierensis, which writes that "Count García of Grañón, called Crispus, and six other counts with him were killed". The Chronicon mundi states that "Sancho, the king's son, and Count García Fernández and Count Don Martín and many others died" at Uclés. "García Fernández" is probably an error for Ordóñez, if the thirteenth-century Chronicon can be trusted, and Martín is probably Martín Laíñez. The last reference to García as living occurs in a private document of the monastery of Valvanera in the Rioja dated that year. His death left a power vacuum in the Rioja, which for much of the twelfth century fell outside Castilian control.
