= García Álvarez (alférez) =

García Álvarez (died 1108?) was the alférez, or commander of the royal military household, under King Alfonso VI of León and Castile from 1100/2 to 1107. He was the son of Álvar Díaz de Oca and a member of one of the leading families of Castile.

García may have died at the battle of Uclés on 29 May 1108. He does not appear in any contemporary records after 27 December 1107, but this may be simply because he had been replaced in the important post of alférez by Pedro González de Lara. In any case, he died around this time, shortly after his own father.

The 13th-century historian Lucas of Tuy, in his Chronicon mundi, reports that "King Alfonso [VI] gravely offended the Castilian count García de Cabrera and in order to placate the same gave him his sister Elvira as a wife and pacified the whole kingdom that was in rebellion." Since the title of count was rare in Castile in the late 11th century and the only known count of the name, García Ordóñez, could not be whom Lucas meant, it has been surmised that García Álvarez is meant, and that Lucas is using the term "count" loosely to mean "magnate". If this is the case, then García was married to Elvira of Toro. Another 13th-century history, De rebus Hispaniae, records that García was the guardian of the king's son and heir, Sancho Alfónsez, and died defending him at Uclés.

== Sources ==
- Reilly, Bernard (1989). The Kingdom of León-Castilla under King Alfonso VI, 1065–1109. Princeton, N.J.: Princeton University Press.
