= Fernando García de Hita =

Castilian nobleman, considered the founder of the House of Castro (AD 1097–1125)

Fernando García de Hita (or de Fita; floruit 1097–1125) was a Castilian nobleman, traditionally considered the founder of the noble House of Castro. He governed the lordships of Hita and Guadalajara, and frequently attended the royal court under King Alfonso VI and Queen Urraca.

== Parentage ==
"Fernando García de Hita" is a conventional name. Contemporary documents only record Fernando with his patronymic, which may also be spelled "Garcés" or "Garciaz" and indicates that his father's name was García. In one charter, Queen Urraca refers to Fernando as "our cousin, Sir Fernando García" (uobis annaia don Ferrando Garciez). In another, she refers to Fernando's second wife as "my cousin" (mea cogermana). The ancestries of both Urraca and Fernando's second wife are well known and they were not blood relations, the charters can only refer to a blood relation between Urraca and Fernando, simplest to explain by viewing Fernando as the son of Urraca's uncle, King García II of Galicia. Were this the case, Fernando would probably have been born to a mistress while García was in captivity. Other evidence points to Fernando being the son of Count García Ordóñez de Nájera. The Muslim historian Ibn Abi Zar recorded that a "son of Count García" (Iben al-Zand Garsís) held the towns of Guadalajara and Hita. Were Fernando legitimate son of Count García by his first wife, the royal princess Urraca Garcés of Navarre, he would likewise be a cousin of Queen Urraca.

== Career ==
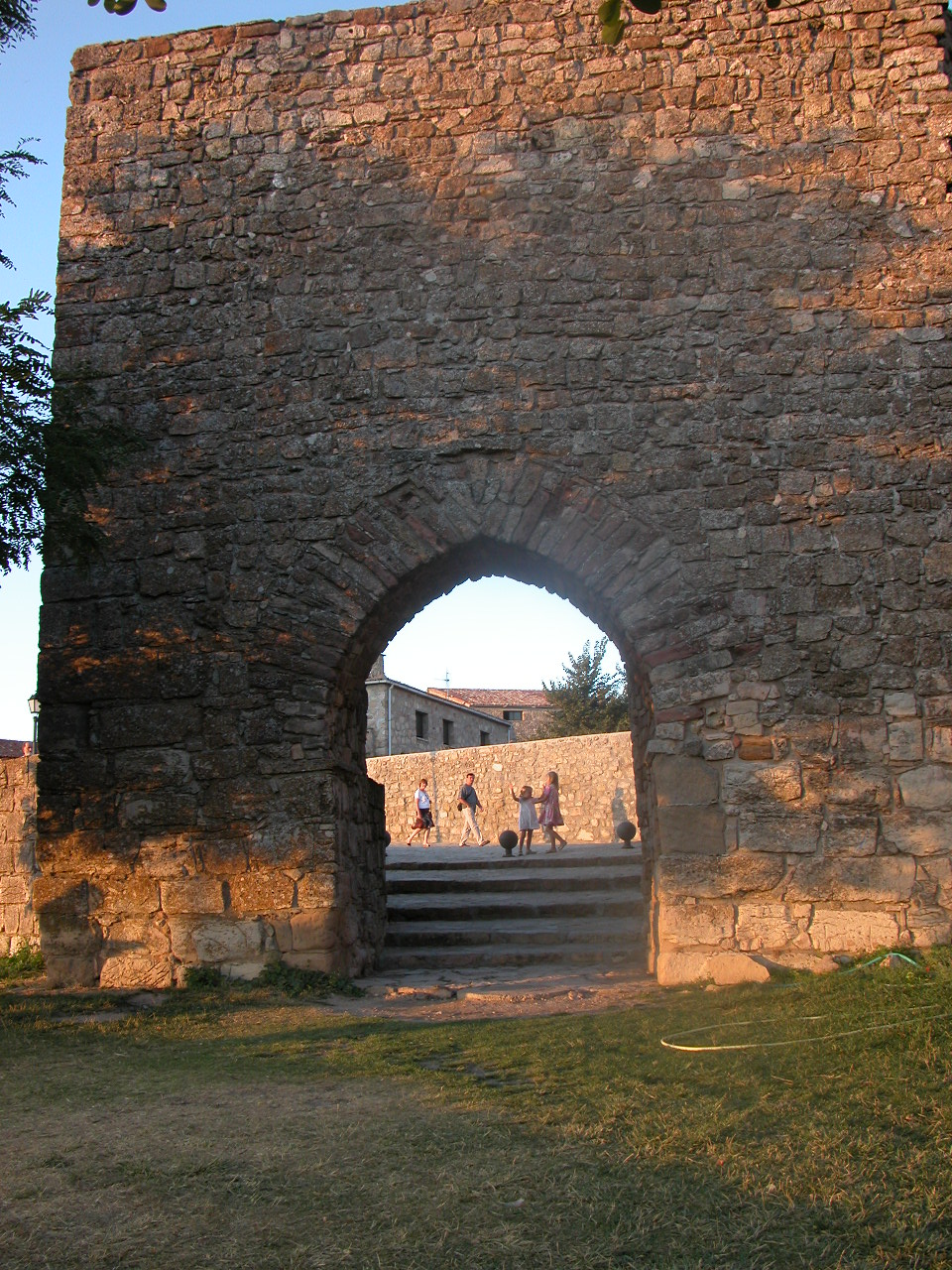
Arabic arch in Medinaceli

In twelfth-century León and Castile, it was uncommon for the lords of the southern frontier—whose primary responsibility was defence against the Almoravids—to frequently attend the itinerant royal court. Fernando seems to have done both. He was given charge of several frontier fiefs (tenencias) and still managed to witness to twelve royal charters during the reign of Urraca. He was the royal official (alcalde) in charge of Guadalajara and Medinaceli in 1107. According to the Anonymous Chronicles of Sahagún, in 1111 Fernando convinced Count Henry of Portugal to break his alliance with King Alfonso I of Aragon and Navarre, and then negotiated a renewed alliance between Alfonso and Urraca after the latter distanced herself from Count Henry. The Historia Compostellana also refers to the aid a certain "Count Fernando" gave his relative, Queen Urraca, at this time, but historians are divided as to whether this is a reference to Fernando García de Hita, since there is no other evidence that he ever received the title of "count".

== Wives and children ==
Fernando's first wife was Tegridia. Based on her son being called sobrinus of Count Rodrigo Martínez, historian Pascual Martínez Sopena concluded she was Tegridia Martínez, a sister of Count Rodrigo and daughter of Count Martín Flaínez and his wife Sancha Fernández, while Jaime de Salazar y Acha concluded she was Tegridia Fernández, sister of Sancha and aunt of Count Rodrigo. Either would make her cousin of Eilo Alfonso, wife of powerful count Pedro Ansúrez. José María Canal Sánchez-Pagín simply calls her a member of the Ansúrez family. She died before her husband, leaving him two sons: Gutierre Fernández de Castro and Rodrigo Fernández de Castro.

Fernando married his second wife, Stephanie (Estefanía), daughter of Count Ermengol V of Urgell, probably in early 1119, while she was still quite young. On 12 November 1119 Fernando had a grant of bridewealth (carta de arras) drawn up for his second wife. He bestowed on her his half of properties at Castrojeriz and Cerrato, which he had acquired with his first wife and which had been divided between him and his children by Tegridia at her death. He also granted Stephanie the half he claimed of some properties at Cevico and Uceda, which he and Stephanie had previously acquired together. Earlier that year, in April or May, Queen Urraca had granted those lands at Uceda and some others at Hita to the betrothed or recently married couple. On 30 June she granted the lands at Cevico to Stephanie to be held independently of her husband or his existing children. Fernando disregarded this royal charter, placing greater stock in aristocratic custom based on Visigothic law, by which he acquired one half of all his wife's acquisitions during their marriage.

Fernando and Stephanie had two daughters: Urraca Fernández and Sancha Fernández. Urraca, probably conceived shortly after their marriage, was betrothed to Count Rodrigo Martínez, who granted her a bridewealth on 29 November 1129, when she was probably only ten years old. Stephanie also bore Fernando two sons: Pedro Fernández de Castro, who became the first Grand Master of the Order of Santiago, and Martín Fernández de Castro.

Fernando died about 1125. Stephanie, ten years a widow and still young, married Count Rodrigo González de Lara in 1135.

== Sources ==
- Barton, Simon (1997). The Aristocracy in Twelfth-Century León and Castile. Cambridge: Cambridge University Press.
- Canal Sánchez-Pagín, José María (1984). "Don Pedro Fernández, primer maestre de la Orden Militar de Santiago: Su familia, su vida". Anuario de Estudios Medievales. 14: 33–72.
- Canal Sánchez-Pagín, José María (1989). "Casamientos de los condes de Urgel en Castilla". Anuario de Estudios Medievales. 19: 749–73.
- Canal Sánchez-Pagín, José María (1997). "El conde García Ordóñez, rival del Cid Campeador: Su familia, sus servicios a Alfonso VI". Anuario de Estudios Medievales. 27 (2): 119–35.
- Martínez Sopena, Pascual (1987). "Parentesco y Poder en Leon Durante el Siglo XI. La "Casata" de Alfonso Diaz". Studia Historica. Historia Medieval. 5: 33–87.
- Martínez Sopena, Pascual (1990). "El conde Rodrigo de León y los suyos: herencia y expectativa del poder entre los siglos X y XII". In Pastor de Togneri, Reyna (ed.). Relaciones de Poder, de Produccion y Parentesco en la Edad Media y Moderna. Madrid: Consejo Superior de Investigaciones Científicas. pp. 5–84.
- Reilly, Bernard F. (1982). The Kingdom of León-Castilla under Queen Urraca, 1109–1126. Princeton, NJ: Princeton University Press.
- Salazar y Acha, Jaime de (1991). "El linaje castellano de Castro en el siglo XII: Consideraciones e hipótesis sobre su origen". Anales de la Real Academia Matritense de Heráldica. 1: 33–68. ISSN 1133-1240.
- Torres Sevilla-Quiñones de León, Margarita Cecilia (1999). Linajes nobiliarios de León y Castilla: Siglos IX–XIII. Salamanca: Junta de Castilla y León, Consejería de educación y cultura. ISBN 84-7846-781-5.
