= Sancho Alfónsez =

Infante of Castille and Leon (c. 1093–1108)

Sancho Alfónsez (or Adefónsez) (c. 1093 – 29 May 1108) was the only son of King Alfonso VI of Castile and León; his mother was the Moorish princess Zaida. Alfonso's heir from May 1107, he eventually co-ruled from Toledo. He predeceased his father, being killed while trying to escape the field of the Battle of Uclés. His death, on his first recorded military expedition, precipitated a succession crisis that ended with the accession of his elder half-sister Urraca and her husband, Alfonso the Battler, already King of Navarre and Aragon, to the throne of Kingdom of Castile-León.

== Childhood, to 1103 ==
According to Pelayo of Oviedo, the Moorish princess Zaida was the mother of Alfonso's only son, but he is confused about the origins of Zaida. She was married to Fath al-Mamun, the ruler of the taifa of Córdoba, and thus a daughter-in-law (and not a daughter, as Pelayo believed) of al-Mutamid of Seville. Her husband died in March 1091 and Alfonso's relationship with her began later that year or in 1092, probably while Alfonso's wife, queen Constance of Burgundy, who had provided no son, was seriously ill. Constance died in Autumn 1093. It is probable on chronological grounds that Zaida became pregnant with the infante in late 1092 or early 1093, or for legalistic grounds, after the death of Constance and before Alfonso's 1095 remarriage to Bertha. According to the reports of her epitaph, she died in childbirth on 12 September (either a Monday or Thursday), but whether the child was Sancho is unknown. Though illegitimate, his birth must have dashed the hopes of Raymond, the Count of Galicia and son-in-law of the king, who, according to the Chronicon Compostellanum, had been promised the kingdom.

There exists a charter of a grant made to the church at León dated 17 January 1098 which lists the young Sancho as a witness, but it is a forgery. Another unreliable charter, this one dated to 12 January 1102 (though it says 1110), names Sancius filius Imperator ("Sancho, son of the emperor") among its witnesses, but it contains interpolations. Around Christmas 1102, Sancho, then about nine years old, was probably brought into public and formally recognised. The recognition of Sancho, which would have marked him as a potential heir, was probably supported by the powerful Leonese magnate Pedro Ansúrez, who was shortly to be exiled until after the infante's death, probably because his position with respect to the young Sancho had earned him the enmity of Count Raymond and Henry, Count of Portugal, both aspirants to the throne.

== Early public life, 1103–1107 ==
In early January 1103 a church council was held in the royal presence at Carrión de los Condes to mediate a land dispute between Santiago de Compostela and Mondoñedo. Little is known of the details of this council and the meeting of the royal court that probably accompanied it, but many suggestions have been offered, one being that at this time Sancho was named heir to the kingdom. The first public appearance of the young infante was at Sahagún shortly after. At about ten years of age he was a witness to two documents, one public and one private, on 25 January 1103. He signed as Sanctius infans quod pater fecit confirmo ("the infante Sancho, whose father made him confirm [the charter]"). He thereafter figures more and more in royal charters. Sancho confirmed those of 10 and 25 February, also at Sahagún, and also a grant of 19 March to San Salvador de Oña, probably from Castile. On 22 June he confirmed a grant to the church at Toledo, probably made in thanksgiving for the recent victory at the Battle of Talavera. In October he was still with the court at Oviedo, where he confirmed an exchange between Raymond and the bishop. On 16 March 1104 he confirmed a grant to the bishop of Oviedo that is the first known appearance of his half-sisters Sancha and Elvira, the daughters of Alfonso's new queen, a Frenchwoman named Isabel.

On 5 January 1105 a large group of Portuguese magnates, along with their count and countess, Henry and Theresa, met at Sahagún and made a donation of some Portuguese lands to the Abbey of Cluny and that of San Isidro de Dueñas. Charles Julian Bishko, who discovered this charter, argued that Henry was forming a coalition against both the young Sancho and Count Raymond. This, however, presumes the absence of Alfonso from his own court. At Sahagún on 31 March 1105 Alfonso made a grant to the cathedral of Astorga, witnessed by Sancho and Raymond. Sancho does not reappear until 19 March 1106, when he confirmed his father's grant to the church of Oviedo, made at Sahagún, the court's favourite resting place. He then confirmed a private charter at Sahagún on 18 January 1107. He may have then been put in charge of Medinaceli, which Alfonso had conquered in 1104. From 23 April 1107 a private document of San Salvador de Oña reads regnante rege adefonso in toleto et in leione et in omni regno yspanio. Santius filius. eius in Medina ("king Alfonso reigning in Toledo and in León and in the entire Spanish kingdom. Sancho, his son, [reigning] in Medinaceli"). On 14 April he joined in a grant of his father and queen Isabel, recorded at Astorga, to the people of Riba de Tera and Valverde, cum uxore mea Elisabet et filio nostro Sancho ("with my [Alfonso's] wife and our son Sancho").

== Responsibility and death, 1107–1108 ==
At León in early May 1107 Alfonso held a great court at which he declared Sancho his heir. On 14 May Alfonso's granted the right of coinage to the bishop of Santiago de Compostela and the grant was confirmed by Sancho, who for the first time signed as regnum electus patri factum ("made king-elect by his father"). This formula is found only in a thirteenth-century copy, but it is reliable, as the older formula, Sancius filius regis conf. ("Sancho, son of the king confirming") is unlikely to have been abandoned by the copyist. Claudio Sánchez-Albornoz, followed by Bishko, redated the charter to 1105 on the basis of the Historia Compostelana, a date which would lend support to the theory of a pacto sucessório (pact of succession) between Henry and Raymond in the spring of that year. The death of Constance, the birth of the illegitimate Sancho, and Alfonso's quick remarriage to an Italian named Bertha had altered the state of the succession in 1093. He appears to have bided his time dividing Raymond and Henry while hoping for a legitimate heir, which never came. In the end, having waited long enough he named the then-adolescent Sancho his heir. On 27 May 1107 Raymond died. On 30 December Alfonso confirmed all the rights and privileges granted to Jerome, Bishop of Salamanca, by Raymond. Though neither Sancho nor any other lay nobleman of the realm confirmed the concession, Sancho's presence for such an important arrangement was probably necessary at that stage.

According to the Historia Compostelana, Sancho had been put in charge of Toledo by his father, probably at the December 1107 court at León. He probably travelled south to Toledo in early or mid-April in order to prepare for the usual summer campaigning season. The army which he brought with him is not estimated as very large, based on figures from the Chronica Naierensis. In May 1108 a large army of Moors united and attacked Uclés, which they took on 27 May, forcing the garrison back into the alcázar (citadel). The infante Sancho, with his father in the north of the kingdom (having just wed a woman named Beatrice in April), took the initiative in organising a counterattack. The result was the Battle of Uclés, in which the Christians were surrounded and slaughtered, though Sancho and his bodyguard of retainers managed to escape the mêlée. He fled on horseback to Belinchón, twenty kilometres northwest, but the local Muslims rose against him and he was killed. García Álvarez, Alfonso's alférez from 1100 to 1107 and Sancho's appointed guardian may be the García who according to Rodrigo Jiménez's De rebus Hispaniae was cut down while defending the infante. He died without issue.
