= Zaida of Seville =

Eleventh century Iberian Muslim refugee and royal mistress

- Zaida of Seville
- Born: 1070
- Died: 1093/1107(?)
- Father: possibly Al-Mu'tamid ibn Abbad

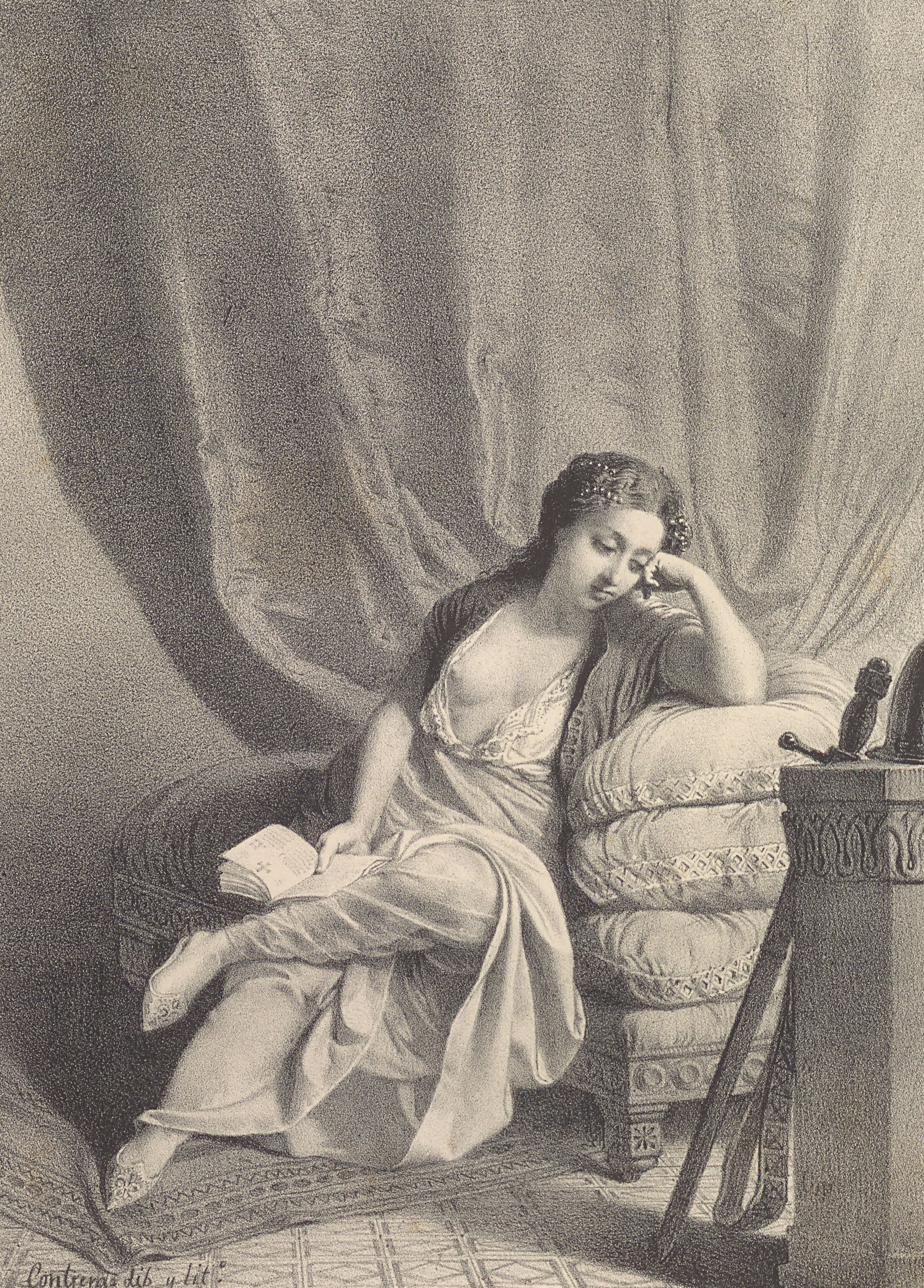
Portrait of Zaida de Seville

Zaida of Seville (c. 1070–1093/1108?) was a refugee Arab princess, formerly associated with the Abbadid dynasty, who became a mistress and then perhaps wife of king Alfonso VI of León and Castile.

== Biography ==
She is said by Al-Andalus sources to have been the daughter-in-law of Al Mutamid, the King of Seville, wife of his son Abu al Fatah al Ma'mun, ruler of the Muslim Taifa of Córdoba, (d. 1091). Later Iberian Christian chroniclers call her Al Mutamid's daughter, but the Islamic chronicles are considered more reliable. With the fall of Seville to the Almoravids, she fled to the protection of Alfonso VI of Castile, becoming his mistress, converting to Catholicism and taking the baptismal name of Isabel.

She was the mother of Alfonso's only son, Sancho, who, though illegitimate, was named his father's heir. (Sancho was killed at the Battle of Uclés (1108), during his father's lifetime.)

It has been suggested that Alfonso's fourth wife – also named Isabel – may have been Zaida, but this is still subject to scholarly debate. Some scholars believe Zaida and Queen Isabel were distinct, or suggest that Alfonso had two successive wives known as Isabel, with Zaida being the second. Alfonso's daughters Elvira and Sancha, were by Queen Isabel and Zaida may, therefore, have been their mother. Zaida is said to have died in childbirth, but it is unclear whether this was at the birth of her known son Sancho in 1093, or at the birth of a different child otherwise unknown. Queen Isabel is last mentioned in historical documents in May 1108, which may coincide with the birth of the younger daughter of Queen Isabel (either Sancha or Elvira). A funerary marker, formerly at Sahagun but later moved to Leon, bore the inscription:

H.R. Regina Elisabeth, uxor regis Adefonsi, filia Benabet Regis Sevillae, quae prius Zayda, fuit vocata
("Queen Isabel, wife of King Alfonso, daughter of Aben-abeth, king of Seville; previously called Zayda.")

A second inscription memorializes Queen Isabel, making her daughter of Louis, King of France, although there was no French king named Louis in the generation prior to Queen Isabel. Neither memorial is contemporary and neither is generally viewed as credible.

== British Monarchs and the Prophet Muhammed ==
The alleged descent from the Prophet Muhammed to Queen Elizabeth II

Zaida of Seville is a key figure in a pseudohistorical theory that the British monarchy is descended from the prophet Muhammed, reported by various British newspapers and spuriously attributed to Burke's Peerage, although Burke's has responded to the matter that "unfortunately, we have no genealogical information relating to this. We were not the original source, even though that has been incorrectly repeated over the years."
