= Battle of Uclés =

Battle of Uclés may refer to:

- Battle of Uclés (1108), a battle in the Crusades between Castile and León alliance against the Almoravids
- Battle of Uclés (1809), a battle in the Peninsular War between France and Spain
