= García Álvarez =

García Álvarez may refer to:

- García Álvarez (alférez) (died 1108), Castilian knight
- Garci Álvarez de Toledo (died 1370), Castilian grand master of the Order of Santiago
- García Álvarez de Toledo, 1st Duke of Alba (1424–1488), Castilian military commander
- García Álvarez de Toledo, 4th Marquis of Villafranca (1514–1577), Spanish military commander
- García Álvarez de Toledo, 6th Marquis of Villafranca (1579–1649), Spanish military commander
