= Alfonso VI of León and Castile =

Iberian King (c. 1040 – 1109)

Alfonso VI
- 12th century miniature of Alfonso VI from the Tumbo A codex at the Cathedral of Santiago de Compostela.

King of León
- First reign: 1065–1072
- Predecessor: Ferdinand I
- Successor: Sancho II
- Second reign: 1072–1109
- Predecessor: Sancho II
- Successor: Urraca

King of Galicia and Portugal
- First reign: 1071–1072 (jointly with Sancho II)
- Predecessor: García II
- Successor: Sancho II
- Second reign: 1072–1109
- Predecessor: Sancho II
- Successor: Urraca

King of Castile
- Reign: 1072–1109
- Predecessor: Sancho II
- Successor: Urraca

Emperor of All Spain
- Reign: 1077–1109
- Coronation: 1077
- Predecessor: Ferdinand I
- Successor: Urraca & Alfonso

King of Toledo
- Reign: 1085–1109
- Successor: Urraca
- Born: c. 1040 – 1041; Compostela, Kingdom of León
- Died: 1 July 1109; Toledo, Kingdom of Toledo
- Burial: Sahagún, León, San Mancio chapel in the royal monastery of Santos Facundo y Primitivo
- Spouses: Agnes of Aquitaine; Constance of Burgundy; Berta; Zaida (Isabel) (possibly his mistress); Beatrice
- Issue more...: Elvira, Countess of Toulouse; Theresa, Countess of Portugal; Urraca, Queen of León; Sancho Alfónsez; Elvira, Queen of Sicily
- House: Jiménez
- Father: Ferdinand I of León
- Mother: Sancha of León

Alfonso VI (c. 1040/1041 (Note: Alfonso was the fourth child and had already been born by April 1043 when his father made a donation and mentions all of his five children.) – 1 July 1109), nicknamed the Brave (El Bravo) or the Valiant, was king of León (1065–1109), Galicia (1071–1109), (Note: Rege domno Adefonso, qui regebat Castella et Legione et tota Gallecia,) and Castile (1072–1109).

After the conquest of Toledo in 1085, Alfonso proclaimed himself victoriosissimo rege in Toleto, et in Hispania et Gallecia (most victorious king of Toledo, and of Spain and Galicia). This conquest, along with El Cid's taking of Valencia would greatly expand the territory and influence of the Leonese/Castilian realm, but also provoked an Almoravid invasion that Alfonso would spend the remainder of his reign resisting. The Leonese and Castilian armies suffered decisive defeats in the battles of Sagrajas (1086), Consuegra (1097) and Uclés (1108), in the latter of which his only son and heir, Sancho Alfónsez, died, and Valencia was abandoned but Toledo remained part of an expanded realm that he passed to his daughter.

== Life ==
=== Birth and early years ===
The son of Ferdinand I, King of León and Count of Castile and his wife, Queen Sancha, Alfonso was a "Leonese infante [prince] with Navarrese and Castilian blood". His paternal grandparents were Sancho Garcés III, king of Pamplona and his wife Muniadona of Castile, and his maternal grandparents were Alfonso V of León (after whom he was probably named) and his first wife Elvira Menéndez.

The year of Alfonso's birth is not recorded in the medieval documentation. According to one of the authors of the Anonymous Chronicle of Sahagún, who met the monarch and was present at his death, he died at age 62 after reigning 44 years. (Note: Some sources give the age in the Chronicle of Sahagún as 72, which would place his birth in 1037.) This indicates that he was born in the second half of 1047 or in the first half of 1048. Pelagius of Oviedo wrote that Alfonso was 79 when he died, but that would place his birth around 1030, before his parents' marriage.

According to the Historia silense, the eldest child of Ferdinand I and Sancha, a daughter called Urraca, was born when her parents were still Count and Countess of Castile, so her birth could be placed in 1033–34. The second child and eldest son, Sancho, must have been born in the second half of 1038 or in 1039. The third child and second daughter, Elvira, may have been born in 1039–40, followed by Alfonso in 1040–41, and finally the youngest of the siblings, García, sometime between 1041 and 24 April 1043, the date on which King Ferdinand I, in a donation to the Abbey of San Andrés de Espinareda, mentions his five children. All of them except Elvira signed a document in the monastery of San Juan Bautista de Corias on 26 April 1046.

All the children of King Ferdinand I, according to the Historia silense, were educated in the liberal arts, and the sons were also trained in arms, the "art of running horses in the Spanish usage", and hunting. The cleric Raimundo was in charge of Alfonso's early education. Once king, Alfonso appointed him Bishop of Palencia and referred to him as magistro nostro, viro nobile et Deum timenti ("our master, a noble man who fears God"). Alfonso probably spent long periods in Tierra de Campos, where, along with Pedro Ansúrez, the son of Ansur Díaz and nephew of Count Gómez Díaz de Saldaña (both members of the Banu Gómez lineage), he learned the art of war and what was expected of a knight.

=== Ascension to the throne ===
As the second son of the king of León and count of Castile, Alfonso would not have been entitled to inherit the throne. At the end of 1063, probably on 22 December, taking advantage of the fact that numerous magnates had gathered in León, capital of the kingdom, for the consecration of the Basílica of San Isidoro, Ferdinand I summoned a Curia Regia to make known his testamentary dispositions, under which he decided to distribute his patrimony among his children, a distribution that would not become effective until the death of the monarch in order to prevent any disputes arising after his death:

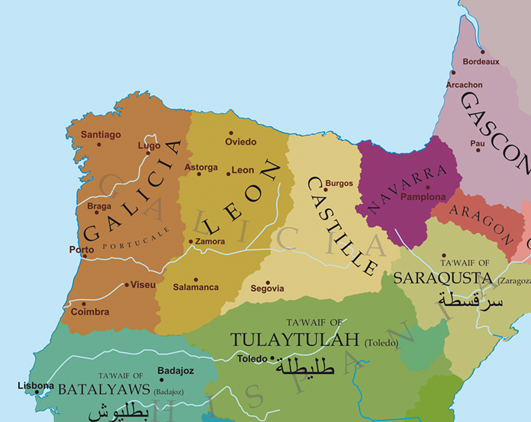
Political situation in the Northern Iberian Peninsula around 1065: Garcia II´s domains (Galicia) Badajoz, owing tribute to Garcia Seville, owing tribute to Garcia Alfonso VI's domains (León) Toledo, owing tribute to Alfonso Sancho II´s domains (Castile) Zaragoza, owing tribute to Sancho

- Alfonso inherited the Kingdom of León, "the most extensive, valuable and emblematic part: the one that contained the cities of Oviedo and León, cradles of the Asturian-Leonese monarchy", which included Asturias, León, Astorga, El Bierzo, Zamora with Tierra de Campos as well as the parias of the Taifa of Toledo.
- His elder brother, Sancho, was given the Kingdom of Castile, created by his father for him, and the parias of the Taifa of Zaragoza. (Note: "Despite being the eldest son, Sancho received, in terms of territory, the smallest part, a very mutilated Castile, while León —to which the royal title was attached— with the most extensive lands, was assigned to the second of the brothers, Alfonso, as if he was the favorite child".)
- His younger brother, García, received the entire region of Galicia, "elevated to the rank of kingdom" that extended south to the Mondego River in Portugal with the parias of the Taifa of Badajoz and Seville.
- Their sisters, Urraca and Elvira, both received the Infantazgo, that is, "the patronage and income of all the monasteries belonging to the royal patrimony" on the condition that they remained unmarried.

The historian Alfonso Sánchez Candeira suggests that the reasons leading King Ferdinand I to divide the kingdom (with Alfonso VI inheriting the royal title) are unknown, but the distribution was probably made because the king considered it proper that each son should inherit the region where he had been educated and spent his early years.

=== Reign ===
==== Consolidation of the throne (1065–1072) ====
After his coronation in the city of León in January 1066, Alfonso VI had to confront the expansionist desires (although Alfonso would prove himself as having the same or more so) of his brother Sancho II, who, as the eldest son, considered himself the sole legitimate heir of all the kingdoms of their father. The conflicts began after the death of their mother Queen Sancha on 7 November 1067, leading to seven years of war among the three brothers. The first skirmish was the Battle of Llantada, a trial by ordeal in which both brothers agreed that the one who was victorious would obtain the kingdom of the defeated brother. Although Sancho II was the winner, Alfonso VI did not comply with the agreement; even so, relations between them remained cordial as evidenced by the fact that Alfonso was present at the wedding of Sancho II to an English noblewoman named Alberta on 26 May 1069. This was the same event where both decided to join forces to divide between themselves the Kingdom of Galicia that had been assigned to their younger brother García II. In the wake of the fratricidal war waged between the successors of al-Muzaffar, ruler of the taifa of Badajoz, upon the latter's death in 1068, Alfonso managed to exploit the situation in order to extract economic profit, even though the taifa nominally fell under García's sphere of influence.

With the complicity of Alfonso VI, Sancho II invaded Galicia in 1071, defeating their brother García II who was arrested in Santarém and imprisoned in Burgos until he was exiled to the Taifa of Seville, then under the rule of Al-Mu'tamid ibn Abbad. After eliminating their brother, Alfonso VI and Sancho II titled themselves kings of Galicia and signed a truce.

The truce was broken with the Battle of Golpejera on 12 January 1072. Although Sancho II's troops were victorious, he decided not to persecute his brother Alfonso, who was imprisoned in Burgos and later transferred to the monastery of Sahagún, where his head was shaved and he was forced to wear a chasuble. Thanks to the intercession of their sister Urraca, Sancho and Alfonso reached an agreement under which Alfonso VI was able to take refuge in the Taifa of Toledo under the protection of his vassal Al-Mamun, accompanied by his childhood friend, the faithful Pedro Ansúrez and his two brothers Gonzalo and Fernando.

Alfonso VI, from his exile in Toledo, obtained the support of the Leonese nobility and his sister Urraca, who remained strong in the city of Zamora, a lordship that Ferdinand I had granted her previously. When Urraca refused to exchange Zamora for other cities that Sancho had offered her in an effort to control the fortress of Zamora, "key to the future expansion south of the Duero", Sancho besieged the city. However, during the siege, Sancho II was murdered. According to tradition, during the siege a nobleman named Vellido Dolfos appeared before the king, claiming to have changed his loyalty from Urraca to Sancho. Under the pretense of showing him the weak parts of the city's walls, Dolfos separated the king from his guard and killed him with a spear. Although there is no clear evidence that Sancho II's death was due to treason rather than deceit, since Dolfos was Sancho II's enemy, his murder occurred in a warlike attack during the siege, not near the city walls, but rather in a nearby forest where Dolfos lured the Castilian king away from his armed protection. The violent death of Sancho II, who had no descendants, allowed Alfonso VI to reclaim his throne as well as Sancho's and Garcia's original inheritances of Castile and Galicia, respectively.

Although Rodrigo Díaz de Vivar (El Cid), the standard-bearer and confidant of King Sancho II, was present at the siege of Zamora, the role he played in this event is not known. Neither can Sancho II's death be blamed on Alfonso VI, who, when his brother was killed, was in exile far from the events. However, this did nothing to prevent speculation that Alfonso was somehow involved in Sancho's murder; despite a paucity of evidence, "minstrels and ballads filled this void with beautiful literary creations devoid of any historical reality".

The lingering suspicion over this event would later become part of the Leyenda de Cardeña, a set of legendary narrative materials concerning El Cid which began to develop in the 13th century.

According to legend, Alfonso VI was forced by El Cid to take an oath denying that he had been involved in his brother's death, thus giving rise to mutual distrust between the two men, despite Alfonso VI's efforts at rapprochement by offering his kinswoman Jimena Díaz to El Cid in marriage as well as the immunity of his patrimony. These events and their consequences would eventually come to be considered historical by many later chroniclers and historians; however, most modern historians deny that such an event ever took place.

Thanks to Sancho II's death, García II could regain his own throne of Galicia; however, the following year, on 13 February 1073, Alfonso summoned García to a meeting, whereupon he imprisoned his younger brother. Garcia was held at the castle of Luna for seventeen years, where he eventually died on 22 March 1090. With his two brothers out of the way, Alfonso VI was able to secure the loyalty of both the high clergy and the nobility of his territories with ease; to confirm this, he spent the next two years visiting them.

==== Territorial expansion (1072–1086) ====
Now established on the Leonese throne, and with the title of "Emperor", a relic of the Leonese tradition (which scholars describe as neogoticismo), Alfonso VI spent the following fourteen years of his reign expanding his territories through conquests such as that of Uclés and the lands of the Banu Di-l-Nun family. In 1072 he entitled himself rex Spanie.

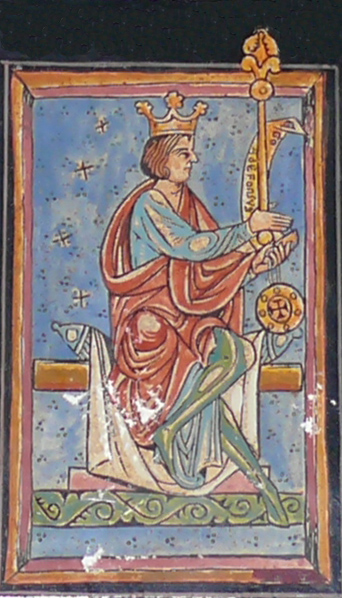
Alfonso in the Libro de las Estampas

In 1074, in alliance with Al-Mamun, ruler of the Taifa of Toledo, Alfonso waged an offensive against the Zirid ruler of the Taifa of Granada, Abd Allâh, taking the strategic fortress of Alcalá la Real.

Following the assassination of Sancho IV of Navarre in 1076, leaving only minor sons, the local Navarrese nobility divided over the succession to the Navareese crown. Alfonso VI had immediately taken possession of Calahorra and Najera, and also received the support of the nobility of Vizcaya-Álava and La Rioja, while the eastern nobility supported Sancho Ramírez of Aragon, who moved into the remainder of the kingdom. After the two kings reached an accord, Sancho Ramírez was recognized as king of Navarre and Alfonso VI annexed the territories of Álava, Vizcaya, part of Guipúzcoa and La Bureba, adopting in 1077 the title of Imperator totius Hispaniae ("Emperor of all Spain").

His great territorial expansion came at the expense of the Taifa Muslim kingdoms. Alfonso VI continued their economic exploitation by means of the system of parias, and succeeded in subduing most of the Taifa kingdoms as his tributaries, enforced by the threat of military intervention. In 1074, he probably recovered payment of the parias of Toledo, and the same year, helped by troops of that city, he cut down trees on the lands of the Taifa of Granada, which consequently also began to pay him taxes. In 1076, the Emir of Zaragoza, who wished to seize Valencia without being disturbed by Alfonso VI, agreed to resume payment of the parias. In 1079, he conquered Coria.

One of the initiatives of these years, known as the "Treason of Rueda", ended in failure. It took place in 1083 in the castle of Rueda de Jalón, when Alfonso VI received news that the governor of that stronghold, which belonged to the Taifa of Zaragoza, intended to surrender it to the Leonese king. The king's troops were ambushed when they entered the castle and several of the most important magnates of the kingdom were killed.

In June 1075, Alfonso VI's vassal and friend Al-Mamun, king of the Taifa of Toledo died of poisoning in Córdoba , and was succeeded by his grandson Al-Qádir, who asked for help from the Leonese monarch to end an uprising against him. Alfonso VI took advantage of this request to besiege Toledo, which finally fell on 25 May 1085. After losing his throne, Al-Qádir was sent by Alfonso VI as king of the Taifa of Valencia under the protection of Álvar Fáñez. To facilitate this operation and to recover payment of the parias owed by the city, which had failed to pay him since the previous year, Alfonso VI besieged Zaragoza in the spring of 1086. In early March, Valencia accepted the rule of Al-Qádir; Xàtiva resisted requesting the aid of the rulers of Tortosa and Lérida until he was forced to do so. Their raid of the region failed, and they withdrew under harassment by the troops of Fáñez.

After this important conquest, Alfonso VI was entitled al-Imbraţūr dhī-l-Millatayn ("Emperor of the Two Religions") and as a gesture to the important Muslim population of the city, he promised them, in addition to respecting their properties, the right to use the main mosque. This decision was later revoked by the newly appointed archbishop of Toledo, Bernard of Sédirac, who took advantage of the king's absence from Toledo and with the support of Queen Constance.

The occupation of Toledo—which allowed Alfonso VI to incorporate the title of King of Toledo with those he already used (victoriosissimo rege in Toleto, et in Hispania et Gallecia)—led to the taking of cities such as Talavera and fortresses including the castle of Aledo. He also occupied Mayrit (now Madrid) in 1085 without resistance, probably by capitulation. The incorporation of the territory situated between the Sistema Central and the Tajo river would serve as the base of operations for the Kingdom of León, from where he could launch more attacks against the Taifas of Cordoba, Seville, Badajoz and Granada.

==== Almoravid invasions (1086–1109) ====
The conquest of the extensive and strategic Taifa of Toledo, the control of Valencia and the possession of Aledo, which isolated Murcia from the rest of Al-Andalus, worried the Muslim sovereigns of the Iberian Peninsula. The military and economic pressure on the Taifa kingdoms led the rulers of the Taifas of Seville, Granada, Badajoz, and Almeria to seek help from Yusuf ibn Tashfin, the Almoravid Emir who ruled the Maghreb. At the end of July 1086, Almoravid troops crossed the Strait of Gibraltar and landed in Algeciras.

In Seville, the Almoravid army joined the troops of the Taifa kingdoms, and together they marched to Extremadura. There, on 23 October 1086, they faced the troops of Alfonso VI (who had to abandon the siege of Zaragoza) in the Battle of Sagrajas. Álvar Fáñez, who had been called from Valencia, came and joined the king's forces. The battle ended with the defeat of the Christian troops, who returned to Toledo to defend themselves. The Emir, however, did not take advantage of the victory since he had to rush back to Africa because of the death of his son. The defeat marked the beginning of a new era in the Iberian Peninsula that lasted about three decades, in which the military initiative was taken by the Almoravids and Alfonso VI had to remain on the defensive. Nevertheless, he was able to retain Toledo, the main target of the Almoravid attacks.

Alfonso VI asked the Christian kingdoms of Europe to organize a Crusade against the Almoravids, who had recovered almost all the territories he had conquered, with the exception of Toledo, where the king remained strong. To reinforce his position, he reconciled with El Cid, who came to Toledo in late 1086 or early 1087. As a consequence of the serious defeat, the Andalusian taifas stopped paying the parias. The Cid, however, succeeded in re-subjugating the rebel Taifas over next two years.

Even though the crusade did not finally materialize, a large number of foreign knights came to the Iberian Peninsula. They included Raymond and Henry of Burgundy, who married Alfonso VI's daughters Urraca (1090) and Teresa (1094), respectively, which led to the establishment of the Anscarid and Capetian dynasties in the peninsular kingdoms. Some of the crusaders unsuccessfully besieged Tudela in the winter of 1087, before withdrawing. That same year, the king crushed a revolt in Galicia aimed at releasing his brother García II.

In 1088 Yusuf ibn Tashfin crossed the Strait of Gibraltar for the second time, but was defeated at the siege of Aledo and suffered the desertion of many of the rulers of the taifas. When the emir came again to the peninsula, he decided to depose all the taifa rulers and became the sole king of the entire Al-Andalus territory. Thanks to the Muslim defeat in Aledo, Alfonso VI had been able to resume the collection of the parias by threatening the ruler of the city that he would chop all the trees in the territory of Granada and then went to Seville to subjugate the city again. Abdallah ibn Buluggin of Granada had distanced himself definitively from Yusuf ibn Tashfin and Alfonso VI promised to help him in exchange for his submission.

In June 1090, the Almoravids launched a third attack, deposed the king of Granada, defeated the governor of Córdoba, and after the Battle of Almodóvar del Río, entered Seville and sent King al-Mutamid into exile. In the second half of the year, all the southern taifas had been conquered by the Almoravids and Alfonso was not able to fulfill his promise to help the king of Seville. The king suffered setbacks on all fronts: in the east he failed to seize Tortosa due to the late arrival of the Genoese fleet that was to take part in its capture; further south, Al-Qádir was deposed in a revolt; in the south, his relation with Zaida, daughter-in-law of the king of Seville failed to enhance his image as the champion of the Muslims of the peninsula against the Almoravids; and, finally, in the west, the alliance with the king of Badajoz did not stop the North Africans from conquering this territory. As the price for this alliance, Alfonso VI had obtained Lisbon, Sintra, and Santarém, but lost them in November 1094 when his son-in-law Raymond of Burgundy, responsible for defending these cities, was defeated by the Almoravid army that had taken Badajoz shortly before. The only good news for Alfonso VI was the recovery of Valencia in June by El Cid, who had defeated the Almoravid army that had advanced against him in the Battle of Cuarte on 21 October. This victory set the eastern border for about a decade.

According to some historians, Alfonso VI later defeated a conspiracy of his sons-in-law Raymond and Henry who had plotted to divide the kingdom at his death. To turn them against each other, he gave Henry and Teresa the government of the County of Portugal, until then ruled by Raymond, which comprised the lands from the Minho river to Santarém, while the government of Raymond was limited to Galicia. Other scholars, however, have shown that the pact could not have been made before 1103, suggesting instead that Henry's appointment was made in response to the military defeat of 1094.

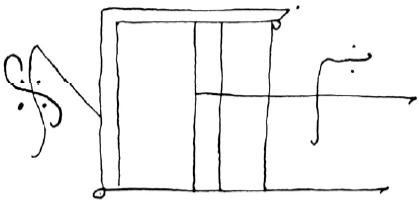
Signature of Alfonso VI, from a 1097 charter.

In 1097, there was a fourth Almoravid invasion. Alfonso received the news when he was on his way to Zaragoza to assist his vassal Al-Mustain II in his confrontation with King Peter I of Aragon and Navarre. Once again, the Almoravid objective was Toledo, and they defeated the Christian forces at the Battle of Consuegra on 15 August, thus confirming the decline of the reign of Alfonso VI that had begun in 1086 with the defeat at Sagrajas.

In 1099, the Almoravids conquered a large number of the castles that defended Toledo and the surrounding areas and, in the following year, they tried unsuccessfully to seize the city. Henry of Burgundy, Alfonso's son-in-law, was in charge of defending Toledo since the king, at that time, was in Valencia inspecting its defenses. El Cid had died the previous year and his widow, Jimena, was governing the city.

In 1102, Alfonso VI sent troops to help Valencia against the Almoravid threat. The battle took place in Cullera and ended without a clear winner, although Valencia fell into Almoravid hands regardless because Alfonso decided it was too expensive to defend. Alfonso VI supervised the evacuation of Valencia in March and April and set fire to it before leaving; in May, the Almoravids took possession of the remains. The same year, he undertook the repopulation of Salamanca, which protected Coria, and Ávila, which defended the mountain pass that was more accessible from Guadarrama, trying to prepare for an eventual loss of Toledo. To protect the area from the east, in 1104 he besieged and conquered Medinaceli, a key location from which the region of Toledo could be attacked from the east along the valley of the Jalón River. In 1104, 1105, and 1106, the king made several incursions into Andalusian territory, reaching Málaga in 1106, and returned with many Mozarabs, who settled in his kingdom.

In 1108 the troops of the Almoravid Tamim, governor of Córdoba and son of Yusuf ibn Tashfin, attacked Christian territories, but this time the chosen city was not Toledo but Uclés. Alfonso VI was in Sahagún, recently married, elderly and with an old wound that prevented him from riding. Álvar Fáñez, governor of the lands of the Banu Di-l-Nun, was the commander of the army. He was accompanied by Sancho Alfónsez, the king's only son and heir. The armies clashed in the Battle of Uclés on 29 May 1108 and the Christian troops suffered another defeat. The young Sancho Alfónsez, heir to the throne, was killed in battle. As a consequence, the reconquista came to a 30-year standstill, and the County of Portugal eventually became an independent kingdom. The military situation was also serious since the Almoravids almost immediately seized the entire defensive border of the Tagus valley from Aranjuez to Zorita and there were uprisings of the Muslim population in this region.

=== Succession crisis ===
Alfonso VI, already old, had to deal with the problem of his succession. Berta had died without giving him an heir at the end of 1099; shortly after, Alfonso married Isabel who gave him two daughters, but no sons. To further complicate the situation, in March 1105 his grandson Alfonso Raimúndez, son of Urraca and Raymond of Burgundy, was born, a possible contender to the throne in detriment to Sancho Alfónsez, the king's son with Zaida. Montenegro thinks that Alfonso VI legitimized Sancho probably coinciding with the meeting of a council in Carrión de los Condes in January 1103 because from that date onwards, Sancho began to confirm royal charters before his brothers-in-law Raymond and Henry of Burgundy. In May 1107, Alfonso imposed the recognition of Sancho as heir, despite the probable opposition of his daughters and sons-in-law, in the course of a Curia Regia held in León. The situation improved for the king with the death of Raymond of Burgundy in September and the agreement with Urraca so that she remained as sovereign Lady of Galicia, except in the case of remarrying since, in that case, Galicia would pass to her son.

The death of Sancho in the Battle of Uclés on 29 May 1108 left Alfonso VI without his only male heir. He then chose his eldest legitimate daughter Urraca as his successor, but decided to marry her to his rival and famous warrior King Alfonso I of Aragon and Navarre in the autumn of 1108. Although the marriage was celebrated at the end of the following year, it did not lead to the expected stability, but to a long civil war that lasted eight years.

=== Death and burial ===
Alfonso VI died in Toledo on 1 July 1109. The king had come to the city to try to defend it from an imminent Almoravid attack. His body was taken to the locality of Sahagún, and was buried in the Royal Monastery of San Benito, thus fulfilling the wishes of the monarch. The mortal remains of the king were deposited in a stone sepulchre, which was placed at the feet of the church of the Royal Monastery, until the reign of Sancho IV, who deemed it unseemly that his ancestor was buried at the foot of the temple and ordered the tomb to be moved inside and placed in the church's transept, near the tomb of Beatriz, Dowager Lady of Los Cameros and daughter of Infante Frederick of Castile who had been executed by orders of his brother, King Alfonso X the Wise in 1277.

The sepulchre that contained the remains of the king, now having disappeared, was supported on alabaster lions, and was a large ark of white marble, eight feet long and four wide and tall, being covered by a smooth black lid. The tomb was usually covered by a silk tapestry, woven in Flanders, bearing the image of the king crowned and armed, with the representation of the arms of Castile and León on the sides, and a crucifix at the head of the tomb.

The tomb that contained the remains of Alfonso VI was destroyed in 1810, during the fire at the Royal Monastery of San Benito. The mortal remains of the king and those of several of his wives were collected and preserved in the abbey chamber until 1821, when the monks were expelled, and were then deposited by the abbot Ramón Alegrías in a box, which was placed in the southern wall of the chapel of the Crucifix until January 1835, when the remains were collected again and placed in another box and taken to the archive where the remains of the wives of the sovereign were at that time. The purpose was to place all the royal remains in a new sanctuary that was being built at that time. However, when the Royal Monastery of San Benito was dissolved in 1835, the monks delivered the two boxes with the royal remains to a relative of one of them, who kept it hidden until 1902, when these were discovered by Rodrigo Fernández Núñez, a professor at the Institute of Zamora Rodrigo.

The mortal remains of Alfonso VI are now in the Monastery of the Benedictine nuns of Sahagún, at the foot of the temple, in a smooth stone ark and with a cover of modern marble, and in a nearby sepulchre, equally smooth, lie the remains of several of the king's wives.

== Wives, concubines and issue ==
According to Bishop Pelagius of Oviedo, contemporary of the king, in his Chronicon regum Legionensium ("Chronicle of the Kings of León"), Alfonso VI had five wives and two concubines nobilissimas (most noble). The wives were, according to the bishop, Agnes, Constance, Berta, Isabel, and Beatrice and the concubines Jimena Muñoz and Zaida. (Note: Hic habuit quinque uxores legitimas: primam Agnetem; secundam Constanciam reginam, ex qua genuit Urracam reginam, coniugem comitis Raimundi, de qua ipse genuit Sanciam et Adefonsum, regem; tertiam Bertam, Tuscia oriundam; quartam Elisabeth, ex qua genuit Sanciam, coniugem comitis Roderici et Geloiram, quam duxit Rogerius, dux Siciliae; quintam Beatricem, quae mortuo eo, repedavit in patriam suam.) Some chroniclers from north of the Pyrenees report an earlier espousal, to a daughter of William the Conqueror, King of England and Duke of Normandy named Agatha.

=== Agatha of Normandy (?) ===
Several northern sources report that Alfonso was affianced to Agatha, the daughter of William the Conqueror, King of England and Duke of Normandy, an arrangement negotiated in 1067. She is said to have been sent to Iberia, but to have died before the marriage could take place. There is scholarly dispute over whether Alfonso was the Iberian king involved, and if so, whether the daughter of William involved was Agatha or a different daughter, Adelaide. (Note: William of Poitiers relates that two brothers, Iberian kings, were competitors for the hand of a daughter of William, which led to a dispute between them. Some historians have identified these as Sancho II of Castile and his brother García II of Galicia, and the bride as Sancho's documented wife Alberta, who bears a non-Iberian name. The anonymous vita of Count Simon of Crépy instead makes the competitors Alfonso VI and Robert Guiscard, while William of Malmesbury and Orderic Vitalis both show a daughter of William to have been betrothed to Alfonso "king of Galicia" but to have died before the marriage. In his Historia Ecclesiastica, Orderic specifically names her as Agatha, "former fiancee of Harold". This conflicts with Orderic's own earlier additions to the Gesta Normannorum Ducum, where he instead named Harold's fiance as William's daughter, Adelidis. Recent accounts of the complex marital history of Alfonso VI have accepted that he was betrothed to a daughter of William named Agatha, while Douglas dismisses Agatha as a confused reference to known daughter Adeliza. Elisabeth van Houts is non-committal, being open to the possibility that Adeliza was engaged before becoming a nun, but also accepting that Agatha may have been a distinct daughter of William.)

=== Agnes of Aquitaine ===
In 1069, the betrothal with Agnes, daughter of Duke William VIII of Aquitaine, was signed. At the time, she was barely 10 years old and so it was necessary to wait until she reached age 14 for the official wedding, which took place in late 1073 or early 1074. She appears in royal diplomas until 22 May 1077; from that date, the king appears alone in the documentation.

Agnes is said to have died on 6 June 1078, On the other hand, Orderic Vitalis, an English chronicler of the 12th century, said that the marriage of Agnes and Alfonso VI had been annulled in 1080 for reasons of consanguinity, and that Agnes was remarried in 1109 to Count Elias I of Maine.

Reilly suggests that the marriage had been annulled in 1077, probably because of the lack of children. However, Gambra disagrees and believes that there are no reliable sources to support this assertion. In addition to being implied by Orderic, the alleged repudiation appears only in a volume of L'art de vérifier les dates and, according to Gambra, "it is impossible, in the absence of better references, to grant credit to the assertion of Agnes' repudiation". (Note: Reilly bases his assumption on Histoire des comptes de Poitou, vol. II, pp. 307–308 by Alfred Richard who, besides L'Art de vérifier les dates, also refers to the Chronique de Saint Maixent, but this work, according to Gambra, "does not mention the repudiation or the alleged second marriage of Agnes".) In addition, he indicates that Lucas de Tuy, in his Chronicon mundi, indicates that the Queen was buried in Sahagún. Finally, he points out that "If such an important event had taken place, it would not make much sense [...] that Alfonso VI immediately married another princess who was a member of Agnes' family". Agnes and the king's next wife, Constance, were cousins in the third degree, both of them descendants of William III, Duke of Aquitaine. Salazar y Acha concludes that Orderic is in error, and that it was Beatrice, the last wife of Alfonso VI, who as his widow married the Count of Maine.

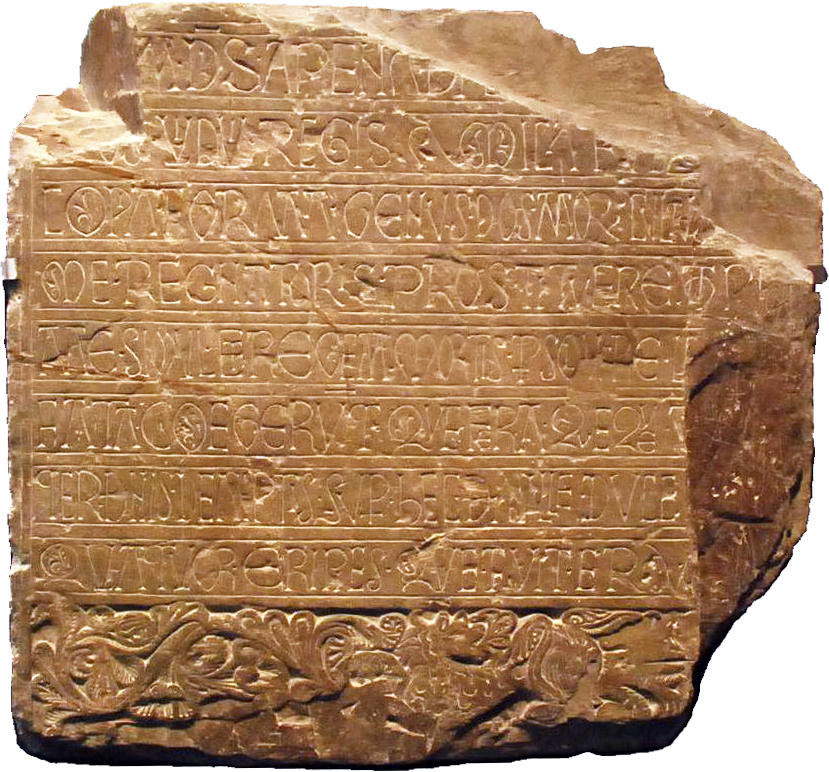
Epitaph of Jimena Muñoz, Alfonso's mistress and progenitor of the first Portuguese royal line.

=== Jimena Muñoz ===
After the death of Agnes, the king had an extra-marital relationship with Jimena Muñoz, "most noble" (nobilissima) concubine "derived from royalty" (real generacion), according to Bishop Pelagius of Oviedo. They had two illegitimate daughters born between 1078 and 1080:

- Elvira Alfónsez (c. 1079 – aft. April 1157), who was married first to Count Raymond IV of Toulouse and then to Count Fernando Fernández de Carrión.
- Teresa Alfónsez (c. 1080 – 11 November 1130), who married Count Henry of Portugal; they received the right to rule the County of Portugal and their eldest son, Afonso Henriques, became the first king of Portugal.

=== Constance of Burgundy ===
At the end of 1079 Alfonso VI married Constance of Burgundy, with whom he appears for the first time in royal charters on 8 May 1080. She was the childless widow of Count Hugues III of Chalon-sur-Saône and daughter of Duke Robert I of Burgundy and his first wife, Hélie de Semur-en-Brionnais, and great-granddaughter of King Hugh Capet of France. She was also the niece of Abbot Hugh of Cluny and aunt of Henry of Burgundy. From this union, which lasted until Constance's death in 1093, (Note: The last royal diploma confirmed by Constance is dated 2 September 1093 and she would have died between that date and the following 25 October when the king appears alone in the documentation.) six children were born, but only one reached adulthood:

- Urraca (c. 1080 – 8 March 1126), successor of her father in the thrones of León and Castile, who married firstly Raymond of Burgundy and secondly King Alfonso I of Aragon. She also had two illegitimate children from her relationship with Count Pedro González de Lara. She was succeeded by her son with Raymond of Burgundy, Alfonso VII.

=== Zaida ===
Bishop Pelagius of Oviedo mentions Zaida as one of the king's two concubines and says that she was the daughter of Al-Mu'tamid ibn Abbad, ruler of the Taifa of Seville. In fact, she was his daughter-in-law, married to his son Abu Nasr Al-Fath al-Ma'mun, ruler of the Taifa of Córdoba. In March 1091, the Almoravid army besieged the city of Córdoba. Zaida's husband, who died during the siege on 26–27 March, sent his wife and children to Almodóvar del Río as a precautionary measure. After becoming a widow, Zaida sought protection at the court of the Leonese king and she and her children converted to Christianity; she was baptized with the name "Isabel" and became the king's concubine. They had one son:

- Sancho Alfónsez (c. 1094 – 29 May 1108), Alfonso VI's only son and heir. His premature death in the Battle of Uclés so grieved his father that he too soon died.

In the chronicle De rebus Hispaniae, by the Archbishop of Toledo, Rodrigo Jiménez de Rada, Zaida is counted among the wives of Alfonso VI, but the Chronica Naierensis and the Chronicon mundi indicate that Zaida was a concubine and not the wife of Alfonso VI.

According to Jaime de Salazar y Acha, followed by other authors, among them, Gonzalo Martínez Diez, they married in 1100, and with this ceremony their son was legitimised and declared heir of the Kingdoms of León and Castile. For Salazar y Acha, Zaida and the fourth wife of Alfonso VI, Isabel, are the same person, "despite of the impotent efforts of later historians to try to prove that she was not the Moor Zaida", and, accordingly, she would also be the mother of Elvira and Sancha Alfónsez. He supports this based on several arguments, including the turnaround time between the last appearance of Bertha and Isabel's first charter as Alfonso's wife, much shorter than the interval preceding his other remarriages presumed to have involved international diplomacy, which Salazar y Acha argues indicates that Isabel was ready to hand rather than being a foreign princess. Likewise, he argues, shortly after the marriage of the king with Isabel his son Sancho begins to confirm royal charters and, if Isabel and Zaida were not the same person, the new queen would not have allowed the new protagonism of Sancho in detriment of her possible future sons. He also cites a charter from the cathedral of Astorga dated 14 April 1107 where Alfonso VI grants some fueros and acts cum uxore mea Elisabet et filio nostro Sancio (with my wife Isabel and our son Sancho). This is the only document where Sancho is referred to as "our son", since in others he only appears as the king's son even though Queen Isabel also confirms the charters.

Reilly follows Bishop Pelagius in distinguishing the mistress Zaida (baptized Isabel) from the Isabel whom Alfonso married in 1100, but argues that to reinforce the position of his son Sancho, the king annulled his marriage to Queen Isabel in March 1106 and remarried to the boy's mother Zaida/Isabel. The hypothesis that Alfonso VI had married Zaida was rejected by Menéndez Pidal and Lévi-Provençal.

On 27 March 1106, Alfonso VI confirmed a donation to the monastery of Lorenzana: (...) eiusdemque Helisabeth regina sub maritali copula legaliter aderente, an unusual formula that confirms a legitimate marriage. Salazar y Acha and Reilly interpret this quote as proof that the king had married Zaida, thus legitimising their son and the relationship of concubinage. Gambra, however, disagrees and says that it is "an extremely weak argument, starting with the documentary reference, which is scarcely significant. Its character is rather ornamental and literary." Montaner Frutos also says that this hypothesis is "unlikely and problematic" since it was not necessary for the king to marry Zaida to legitimize his son and that, furthermore, the French Isabel died in 1107 according to her epitaph. Montaner Frutos also mentions a donation from Queen Urraca years later, in 1115, when she donated properties to Toledo Cathedral and only mentions one Isabel as the king's wife. (Note: ... sicut eam habuerunt et tenuerunt regine uxores patris mei, scilicet, Berta, Isabel atque Beatrix et sicut ego illam inueni et possedi post dicessum patris mei.)

=== Berta ===
On 25 November 1093 Alfonso VI contracted a third marriage with Berta, (Note: Salazar y Acha only mentions that the wedding took place before 28 April 1095.) although in a document dated 13 April 1094 she is not mentioned as would have been the custom at that time. For onomastic reasons, the genealogist Szabolcs de Vajay suggested that she was a member of the House of Savoy, daughter of Count Amadeus II of Savoy, niece of Bertha of Savoy (wife of Henry IV, Holy Roman Emperor), great-granddaughter of Bertha of Milan and first-cousin of another Bertha (who married King Peter I of Aragon and Navarre). Her presence in court was first recorded on 28 April 1095. (Note: In 1096, both confirm a sale made by Ero Rodríguez to the Monastery of San Martín de Xubia: Regnante rex Adefonsus in Toleto et coniuge sua de genere francorum.) She died between 17 November 1099, when she confirms a royal diploma for the last time, and 15 January 1100 when the king appears alone in a donation to the Cathedral of Santiago de Compostela. On 25 January 1100, the king made a donation to the monastery of Sahagún in memory of his deceased wife. There was no issue from this marriage.

=== Isabel ===
Alfonso VI's penultimate marriage was in early 1100 to Isabel and "the cause of controversy during centuries has been whether this Isabel was the same person as the Arab Muslim Princess Zaida or a different individual". Alfonso and Isabel appear together for the first time on 14 May 1100 although the diploma is considered suspicious, and the second time in that same year at an unspecified date. Isabel's last mention in royal diplomas was on 8 and 14 May 1107 and she probably died in the middle of that year. She is, according to Salazar y Acha, Zaida, who after her baptism was called Isabel. If not identical to Zaida, her origin is uncertain. Bishop Pelagius of Oviedo does not refer to her origin nor does he draw any link between mistress Zaida and wife Isabel. Lucas de Tuy in the 13th century, based on the epitaph of Isabel, makes her daughter of King Louis of France, who at that time would have to be Louis VI although this seems to be chronologically impossible. Reilly considers that she was probably of Burgundian origin, although this does not appear in the documentation. Two daughters were born from this union:

- Sancha (c. 1102 – before 10 May 1125), first wife of Rodrigo González de Lara, Count of Liébana, with whom she had Elvira Rodríguez de Lara, wife of Ermengol VI, Count of Urgell. (Note: Along with her husband, Count Rodrigo, they donated to the Monastery of Santa Maria de Piasca their monastery of San Mamés in April 1122, calling herself prolis filia regis Adephonsus. On 10 May 1125, Count Rodrigo appears, without Sancha, with his daughters qua abuit de mea mulier infante domna Sanchia, filia regi imperatori Adefonsi (whom I had from my wife, Infanta Sancha, daughter of the king-emperor Alfonso). Count Rodrigo was already married to his second wife, Estefanía Ermengol in July 1135.)
- Elvira (c. 1103 – 8 February 1135), wife of King Roger II of Sicily.

=== Beatrice ===
Alfonso VI married his fifth wife, Beatrice, probably in the first months of 1108. Both appear together for the first time on 28 May 1108 in Astorga Cathedral and then in two other royal charters: on 1 January 1109 in the Cathedral of León and for the last time on 25 April of the same year in Oviedo Cathedral, about three months before the death of the king. According to Bishop Pelagius of Oviedo, once a widow, Beatrice returned to her homeland. Salazar y Acha suggests that she was the daughter of William VIII, Duke of Aquitaine and his third wife Hildegarde of Burgundy, and that she remarried Elias I, Count of Maine.

== Legacy ==
In the cultural field, Alfonso VI promoted the safety of the Camino de Santiago and promoted the Cluniac Reforms in the monasteries of Galicia, León and Castile. In the spring of 1073, he made the first concession of a Leonese monastery to the Order of Cluny.

The monarch replaced the Mozarabic or Toledan rite with the Roman one. In this respect it is a common legend that Alfonso VI took Mozarabic and Roman breviaries and threw them into the fire. When only the Roman breviary burned, the king threw the Mozarabic one into the fire, thus imposing the Roman rite.

Alfonso VI, the conqueror of Toledo, the great Europeanizing monarch, saw in the last years of his reign how the great political work that he had carried started to be dismantled due to Almoravid attacks and internal weaknesses. Alfonso VI had fully assumed the imperial idea of León and his openness to European influence had made him aware of the feudal political practices which, in the France of his time, reached their most complete expression. In the conjunction of these two elements, Claudio Sánchez-Albornoz sees the explanation of the grant of the iure hereditario (sharing the kingdom between the two daughters and the son instead of bequeathing all to the only son, more typical of Navarrese-Aragonese tradition) of the Counties of Galicia and Portugal to her two Burgundian sons-in-law, Raymond and Henry. After a few years, that decision led to the independence of Portugal and the possibility of an independent Galicia under Alfonso Raimúndez, which ultimately did not materialize when the infante became King Alfonso VII of León.

== Family tree ==
Sancha of Aybar
Ramiro I of Aragon
Sancho V of Pamplona & Aragon

Sancho III of Pamplona	Muniadomna of Castile	Alfonso V of León
García Sánchez III of Pamplona	Ferdinand I of Castile & León	Sancha of León	Bermudo III of León	Robert I of Burgundy	Helie of Semur	Saint Hugh of Cluny
Sancho IV of Pamplona	Urraca of Zamora	Sancho II of Castile	Elvira of Toro	Constance of Burgundy	Alfonso VI of León & Castile	Jimena; Muñoz	García II of Galicia	Henry of Burgundy
Alfonso I of Pamplona & Aragon	Urraca of León	Raymond of Burgundy	Zaida of Seville	Elvira of León	Raymond IV of Toulouse	Teresa of Portugal	Henry of Burgundy
Sancho
Alfonso; Raimúndez

== Bibliography ==
- David, Pierre (1948). "La pacte succesoral entre Raymond de Galice et Henri de Portugal". Bulletin Hispanique (in French). 50 (3): 275–290. doi:10.3406/hispa.1948.3146.
- Arco y Garay, Ricardo del (1954). Sepulcros de la Casa Real de Castilla (in Spanish). Madrid: Instituto Jerónimo Zurita. Consejo Superior de Investigaciones Científicas. OCLC 11366237.
- Bishko, Charles J. (1971). "Count Henrique of Portugal, Cluny, and the antecedents of the Pacto Sucessório". Revista Portuguesa de Historia. 13 (13): 155–88. doi:10.14195/0870-4147_13_8.
- Ayala, Carlos de (2013). "On the origins of crusading in the peninsula: the reign of Alfonso VI (1065–1109)" (PDF). Imago Temporis. Medium Aevum (7). Lleida: Universitat de Lleida. Servei de Publicacions: 225–269. ISSN 1888-3931.
- Barton, Simon (2015). "Spain in the Eleventh Century". In David Luscombe, Jonathan Riley–Smith (ed.). The New Cambridge Medieval History. Vol. 4, c.1024–c. 1198, Part II. Madrid: Cambridge University Press. ISBN 9781107460638.
- Canal Sánchez-Pagín, José María (1991). "Jimena Muñoz, amiga de Alfonso VI". Anuario de Estudios Medievales (in Spanish) (21). Barcelona: Universidad de Barcelona; Instituto de Historia Medieval de España; CSCIC: 11–40. ISSN 0066-5061.
- Canal Sánchez-Pagín, José María (2003). "El conde Gómez González de Candespina: su historia y su familia". Anuario de Estudios Medievales (in Spanish). 33 (33). Universidad de Barcelona; Instituto de Historia Medieval de España; CSCIC: 37–68. doi:10.3989/aem.2003.v33.i1.197.
- Carvalho Correia, Francisco (2008). O Mosteiro de Santo Tirso de 978 a 1588: a silhueta de uma entidade projectada no chao de uma história milenária (in Portuguese) (1st ed.). Santiago de Compostela: Universidade de Santiago de Compostela: Servizo de Publicacións e Intercambio Científico. ISBN 978-84-9887-038-1. Archived from the original on 3 March 2016.
- Douglas, David C. (1964). William the Conqueror: The Norman Impact upon England. London: Eyre & Spottiswood. OCLC 930444939.
- Estepa Díez, Carlos; Fernández González, Etelvina; Rivera Blanco, Javier, eds. (2012). Alfonso VI y su legado. Actas del Congreso Internacional. IX Centenario de Alfonso VI (in Spanish). León: Diputación de León. ISBN 978-84-89410-22-0.
- Elorza, Juan C.; Vaquero, Lourdes; Castillo, Belén; Negro, Marta (1990). Junta de Castilla y León. Consejería de Cultura y Bienestar Social (ed.). El Panteón Real de las Huelgas de Burgos. Los enterramientos de los reyes de León y de Castilla (in Spanish). Publisher Evergráficas S.A. ISBN 84-241-9999-5.
- Gambra, Andrés (1997). Alfonso VI. Cancillería, curia e imperio (in Spanish). Vol. I. Estudio. León: Centro de Estudios e Investigación «San Isidoro», Caja España y el Archivo Histórico Diocesano de León. ISBN 8487667287.
- Guichard, Pierre (1989). Historia de España/ 3, Al-Andalus: musulmanes y cristianos (siglos VIII - XIII), capítulo 4: los nuevos musulmanes (in Spanish). Planeta. p. 591. ISBN 9788432083730.
- Houben, Hubert (2002). Roger II of Sicily: A Ruler Between East and West. New York: Cambridge University Press. ISBN 9780521652087.
- Huici Miranda, Ambrosio (1954). "El sitio de Aledo". Miscelánea de estudios árabes y hebraicos (in Spanish). Vol. 3. pp. 41–55. Archived from the original on 22 August 2016.
- Luis Corral, Fernando (2012). ""Y sometió a su autoridad todo el reino de los leoneses": formas de ejercicio del poder en la Historia Silense o cómo Alfonso VI llegó al trono". E-Spania. Revue interdisciplinaire d'études hispaniques médievales et modernes (in Spanish) (10 (December)). Paris: Sorbonne Université. doi:10.4000/e-spania.21696. ISSN 1951-6169.
- Martin, George (2010). "Hilando un reino. Alfonso VI y las mujeres". E-Spania. Revue interdisciplinaire d'études hispaniques médievales et modernes (in Spanish) (10). doi:10.4000/e-spania.20134. S2CID 162229237.
- Martín Duke, Ángel. "Sancho IV Garcés". Real Academia de Historia.
- Martínez Díez, Gonzalo (2003). Alfonso VI: Señor del Cid, conquistador de Toledo (in Spanish). Madrid: Temas de Hoy, S.A. ISBN 84-8460-251-6.
- Martínez Díez, Gonzalo (2007). El Cid histórico (in Spanish). Barcelona: Editorial Planeta, S.A. ISBN 978-84-08-07165-5.
- Mattoso, José (2014). D. Afonso Henriques (in Portuguese) (2nd ed.). Lisboa: Temas e Debates. ISBN 978-972-759-911-0.
- Mínguez Fernández, José María (2000). Alfonso VI (in Spanish). Hondarribia: Nerea. ISBN 978-84-89569-47-8.
- Mínguez Fernández, José María (2009). "Alfonso VI / Gregorio VII. Soberanía imperial frente a soberanía papal" (PDF). Argutorio: Revista de la Asociación Cultural "Monte Irago" (in Spanish) (year 13, number 23). ISSN 1575-801X.
- Miranda Calvo, José (1976). "La Conquista de Toledo por Alfonso VI" (PDF). Toletum: Boletín de la Real Academia de Bellas Artes y Ciencias Históricas de Toledo (in Spanish) (7): 101–151. ISSN 0210-6310. Archived from the original (PDF) on 20 June 2013.
- Montaner Frutos, Alberto (1998). El Cid en Aragón (in Spanish). Zaragoza: Caja de Ahorros de la Inmaculada (CAI) – Edelvives. pp. 32–38. ISBN 84-88305-75-3.
- Montaner Frutos, Alberto (2005). "La mora Zaida, entre historia y leyenda (con una reflexión sobre la técnica historiográfica alfonsí)". Historicist Essays on Hispano-Medieval Narrative. In Memory of Roger M. Walker (in Spanish). London: Maney Publishing for the MHRA (Publications of the Modern Humanities Research Association). pp. 272–352. ISBN 1-904350-31-3.
- Montenegro, Julia (2010). "La crisis sucesoria en las postrimerías del reinado de Alfonso VI de León y Castilla: el partido Borgoñón" (PDF). Estudios de Historia de España (Buenos Aires) (in Spanish). XII, tome 3. Estudios de Historia de España: 369–388. ISSN 0328-0284.
- Palencia, Clemente (1988). "Historia y leyendas de las mujeres de Alfonso VI". Estudios sobre Alfonso VI y la Reconquista de Toledo (in Spanish). Toledo: Instituto de Estudios Visigótico-Mozárabes de San Eugenio. pp. 281–290. ISBN 8450569826.
- Pallares Méndez, María del Carmen; Portela, Ermelindo (2006). La Reina Urraca (in Spanish). San Sebastián: Nerea, Seria media, 21. ISBN 978-84-96431-18-8.
- Pérez Gil, Javier; Sánchez Badiola, Juan José (2002). Monarquía y monacato en la Edad Media peninsular: Alfonso VI y Sahagún (in Spanish). León: Universidad de León. ISBN 84-7719-811-X.
- Quintana Prieto, Augusto (1969). "Jimena Muñiz, madre de Doña Teresa de Portugal" (PDF). Revista Portuguesa de História (in Spanish). 12 (12): 223–80. doi:10.14195/0870-4147_12_11. hdl:10316.2/46741.
- Reilly, Bernard F. (1992). The Contest of Christian and Muslim Spain: 1031-1157. Cambridge, Mass.: Blackwell. ISBN 9780631199649.
- Reilly, Bernard F. (1989). The Kingdom of León-Castilla under King Alfonso VI, 1065–1109. Princeton: Princeton University Press. ISBN 9788487103032.
- Salazar y Acha, Jaime de (1993). "Contribución al reinado de Alfonso VI de Castilla: algunas aclaraciones sobre su política matrimonial". Anales de la Real Academia Matritense de Heráldica y Genealogía (in Spanish). II. Madrid: Real Academia Matritense de Heráldica y Genealogía: 301–336. ISSN 1133-1240.
- Salazar y Acha, Jaime de (2007). "De nuevo sobre la mora Zaida". Hidalguía. La revista de genealogía, nobleza y armas (in Spanish) (321, March–April). Madrid: Asociación de hidalgos de fuero de España. ISBN 9788495215291. ISSN 0018-1285.
- Salvador Martínez, H. (1992). La rebelión de los burgos: crisis de estado y coyuntura social. Tecnos.
- Sánchez Candeira, Alfonso (1999). Rosa Montero Tejada (ed.). Castilla y León en el siglo X, estudio del reinado de Fernando I (in Spanish). Madrid: Real Academia de la Historia. ISBN 978-84-8951241-2.
- São Payo, Luiz de Mello Vaz de (2002). A Herança Genética de D. Afonso Henriques (in Portuguese). Porto: Universidade Moderna.
- Serrano, Luciano (1910). Becerro gótico de Cardeña. Valladolid: Cuesta.
- Torres Sevilla-Quiñones de León, Margarita Cecilia (1999). Linajes nobiliarios de León y Castilla: Siglos IX-XIII (in Spanish). Salamanca: Junta de Castilla y León, Consejería de educación y cultura. ISBN 84-7846-781-5.
- Vajay, Szabolcs de (1986), "Structures de Prouvoir et Reseaux de Familles du VIIIe au XIIe Siecles", Genealogica & Heraldica: Actas de 17o Congresso das Ciencias Genealogica e Heraldica (in French), pp. 275–315.
- Vajay, Szabolcs (2007). "Reflexiones en torno a Berta, tercera mujer de Alfonso VI". Hidalguía. La revista de genealogía, nobleza y armas (in Spanish) (321, March–April). Madrid: Asociación de hidalgos de fuero de España: 337–343. ISSN 0018-1285.
- van Houts, Elisabeth (2004). "Adelida [Adeliza]". Oxford Dictionary of National Biography (online ed.). Oxford University Press. doi:10.1093/ref:odnb/164. (Subscription, Wikipedia Library access or UK public library membership required.)
- Vitalis, Ordericus (1854). The Ecclesiastical History of England and Normandy, 1619. Vol. III. Translated by Thomas Forester. London: Henry G. Bohn. OCLC 1347543.

Alfonso VI of León and Castile House of Jiménez Born: 1047 Died: 19 June/1 July 1109
Regnal titles
Preceded by Ferdinand I	King of León; 1065–1072	Succeeded by Sancho II
Preceded by García II	King of Galicia; 1071–1072 with Sancho II	Succeeded by Sancho II
Preceded by Sancho II	King of León, Castile and Galicia; 1072–1109	Succeeded by Urraca
Preceded by Yahya al-Qadir	King of Toledo; 1085–1109	Succeeded by Urraca
Vacant Title last held by Ferdinand I	— TITULAR — Emperor of All Spain; 1077–1109	Succeeded by Urraca & Alfonso the Battler
