= Battle of Uclés (1108) =

Part of the Reconquista in present day Spain

Coordinates: 39.9833°N 2.8500°W

- Part of the Reconquista
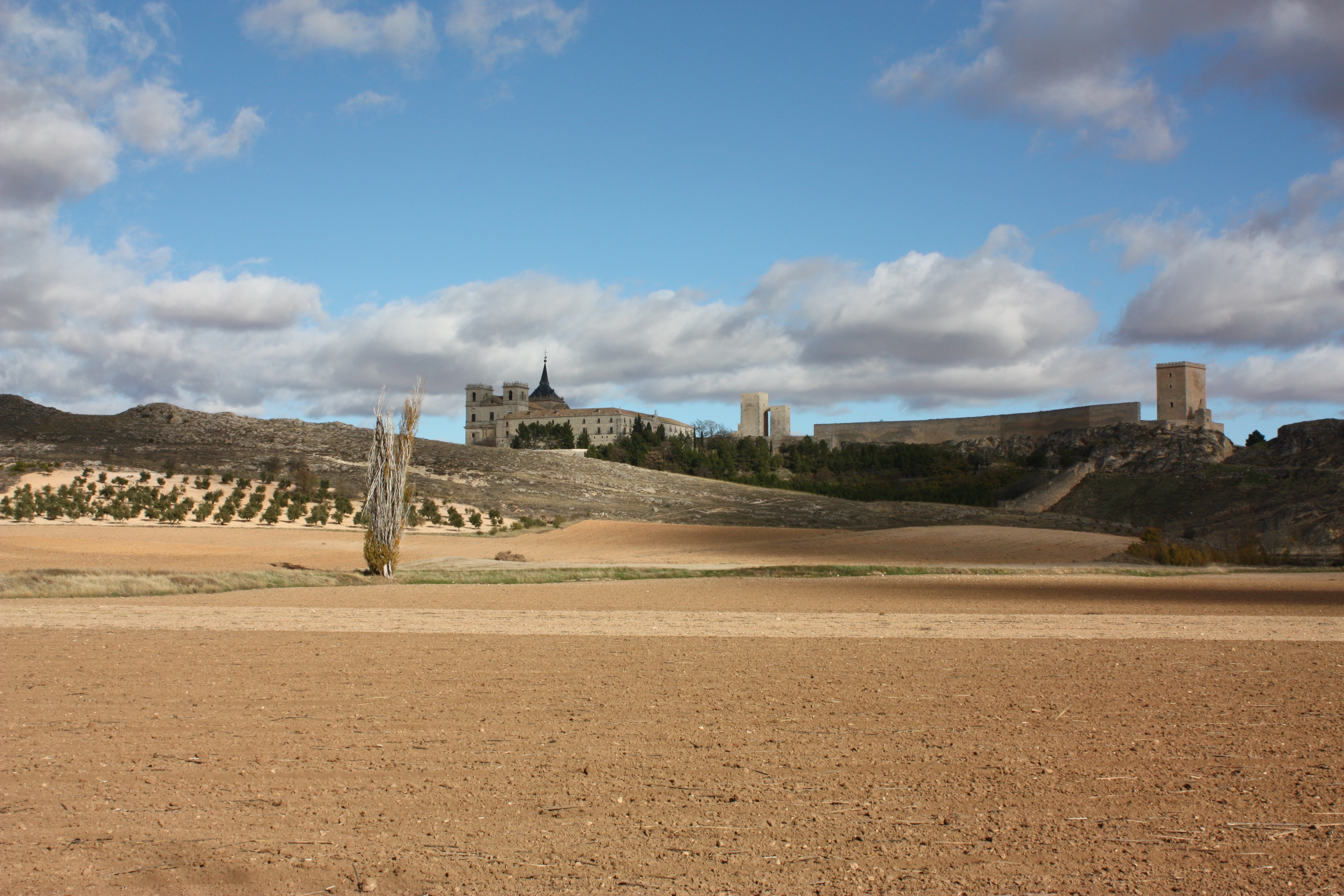
- Battlefield of Uclés
Date	29 May 1108
Location	Uclés
Result	Almoravid victory
Territorial changes	Almoravid retake Cuenca, Huete, Belinchón, Ocaña, Medinaceli, and Uclés.

Belligerents
Almoravid dynasty	Kingdom of Castile; Kingdom of León

Commanders and leaders
Abu Tahir Tamim ibn Yusuf; Muhammad ibn Aysa; Abdallah ibn Fatima; Muhammad ibn Abi Ranq	Sancho Alfónsez †; García Ordóñez †; Álvar Fáñez; Martín Flaínez †; Fernando Díaz †

Strength
>2,300	~2,300

Casualties and losses
Light, incl. the imam al-Jazuli	Heavy, incl. Sancho and seven counts

The Battle of Uclés was fought on 29 May 1108 during the Reconquista period near Uclés just south of the river Tagus between the Christian forces of Castile and León under Alfonso VI and the forces of the Muslim Almoravids under Tamim ibn-Yusuf. The battle was a disaster for the Christians and many of the high nobility of León, including seven counts, died in the fray or were beheaded afterwards, while the heir-apparent, Sancho Alfónsez, was murdered by villagers while trying to flee. Despite this, the Almoravids could not capitalise on their success in the open field by taking Toledo.

== Sources ==
The Arabic sources for the battle are an official letter from Tamim and the narrative history Nazm al-Yuman. The Christian sources nearest in time are the Crónica Najerense, connected to Nájera, and the Historia Compostelana, written from the perspective of the church of Santiago de Compostela. In the thirteenth century Lucas de Tuy included a detailed account in his Chronicon Mundi ab Origine Mundi usque ad Eram MCCLXXIV ("Chronicle of the World from its Origin to the Era 1274 [1231 AD]") and Rodrigo Jiménez de Rada, De rebus Hispaniae, provided the primary account used by historians for the next several hundred years. A romanticised version of Jiménez de Rada's narrative was given in the Primera Crónica General. The Spanish historiography of the battle was dominated by Prudencio de Sandoval until 1949, when Ambrosio Huici Miranda began to edit and compile the Arabic sources (published 1955).

== Preliminary moves ==
Tamim, leading the forces of Granada, set out for Jaén in early May. There he met the forces of Córdoba and they continued together to Chinchilla, where they were joined by the forces of Murcia and Valencia under Muhammad ibn Aysa and Abdallah ibn Fatima, their respective governors. They marched on Uclés, which offered no resistance and was captured on 27 May. The Almoravids then spread out, sacking other Christian settlements in the valley of the Tagus, while the inhabitants fled. The garrison of Uclés meanwhile took refuge in the alcázar.

The Historia Compostelana says that it was the heir, Sancho, who initiated a counter-attack. This is plausible in light of the fact he had already been granted the rule of Toledo by his father, who was in the north of the kingdom at the time of the Almoravid offensive. Sancho had probably moved south with a sizable army in April in preparation for a summer of campaigning. His army included eight Leonese counts and Castilian magnates (los ocho condes of legend), who, with their heavy cavalry retinues, probably counted for a fifth of the total heavy cavalry resources of the crown. Including Sanchos' personal guard, the number of Christian troops was probably about 400 knights and an equal number of squires and grooms: about 1,200 men total. A contingent of townsmen from Calatañazor, Alcalá, and Toledo, led by their alcaldes, numbering probably 750, mostly infantry but some light cavalry, joined the main force before the battle. Including 300 or so men involved in the baggage train, Bernard Reilly estimates a total number of 2,300 Christian troops, while the Arabic sources mention 3,000 Christian heads piled in front of Uclés to terrorise the citizens.

== Battle joined ==
The Christians arrived near Uclés and set up camp on 28 May. Tamim assembled his force with the Córdobans under Muhammad ibn Abi Ranq in front, his own Granadans behind them; the Valencians and Murcians made up the flanks. Battle was joined the next day with a Christian cavalry charge. Though initially successful against the Córdobans, the charging Christians were quickly surrounded while engaging the Granadans and the main force retreated to their camp. The Murcians and Valencians meanwhile attacked the baggage. The infantry was dispersed; the cavalry was caught in their own camp and slaughtered. Sancho, his horse killed and with a small force of seven of his own men, escaped and fled towards Belinchón, but was killed by his Muslim subjects, who took advantage of the battle to revolt. The only count to escape was Álvar Fáñez, who led a large body of horse north to organise the defence of the upper Tagus. In the aftermath the Muslims lured the garrison of the Uclés into sallying from the alcázar and defeated them. The Almoravids followed up their success by taking the castles of Huete and Ocaña, and a few small others.

The identity of the seven dead counts must be patched together from various sources. Crónica Najerense records the death of García Ordóñez, the count of Nájera. Lucas de Tuy records his death also, as well as that of the heir and of Martín Laíñez. Probably Martín's son, Gómez Martínez, also perished. Based on their sudden disappearance from contemporary documents, Reilly suggests that Fernando Díaz, the greatest magnate of Asturias, and the Castilian magnates Diego and Lop Sánchez, probably brothers but not technically counts, were killed in the battle. García Álvarez, the king's alférez, may have perished, but he was never a count and his disappearance from the record may be due only to his replacement.
