= Pedro González de Lara =

Castilian magnate

Pedro González de Lara (died 16 October 1130) was a Castilian magnate. He served Alfonso VI as a young man, and later became the lover of Alfonso's heiress, Queen Urraca. He may have joined the First Crusade in the following of Raymond IV of Toulouse, earning the nickname el Romero ("the wanderer, pilgrim"). At the height of his influence he was the most powerful person in the kingdom after the monarch. The preponderance of his power in Castile is attested in numerous documents between 1120 and 1127. He opposed the succession of Urraca's legitimate heir, Alfonso VII. This dispute ended with his premature death.

It was in Pedro's generation that the use of toponymics, as opposed to just patronymics, began in Spain. Pedro was the first member of his family to use the surname "de Lara", a practice continued by his descendants. A good example of Pedro's style is found in a royal charter of 1 February 1124: uenerabilis comes dominus Petrus de Lara, "the venerable count Don Pedro de Lara".

== Standard-bearer of Alfonso VI (1088–91) ==
Pedro González was son of count Gonzalo Núñez de Lara, the first clearly identifiable member of the Lara family and his wife, Goto Núñez. He had a brother, count Rodrigo González de Lara, and was a kinsman of count Gonzalo Salvadórez, who also held land in Lara. The Lara family lands were located in Old Castile. Between 27 December 1088 and 10 November 1091 Pedro served as alférez, standard-bearer of the king's retinue. At the end of his service he was signing royal documents immediately beneath the names of the counts of the realm. He was replaced as alférez by Gómez González by early 1092. A charter dated May 1098 referring to "Count Pedro, alférez" is almost certainly a forgery or a corruption, since Gómez is known to have still held that post in March, April and May of that year, and Pedro is never referred to as count before 1107.

There is some doubt that the alférez Pedro González was the man who was later count of Lara. There is at least one other man of that name alive at the same time, who, with his wife Elvira Fernández, sold a plot of land for 400 solidi to Count Fruela Díaz and his wife Estefanía.

== In the entourage of Elvira and the First Crusade (1092–1105) ==
Miniature of a siege, from La gran conquista de Ultramar

Count Raymond IV of Toulouse, possibly in 1092, completed a marriage alliance with Alfonso VI by marrying his illegitimate daughter, Elvira. When he decided to take up the cross and join the First Crusade in 1095, he was accompanied by "a group of Spanish knights". Among these Spaniards was probably to be found Pedro González, who disappears from the records of the kingdom of Castile–León at precisely this time, and does not reappear until 22 September 1105 at Burgos. This corresponds to a time after Raymond's death (28 February 1105), which led Elvira and her infant son by Raymond, Alfonso Jordan, to return to Toulouse to lay claim to the county. At the behest of Alfonso VI, in 1105 Pope Paschal II gave the second of three orders (the others coming in 1100 and 1109) commanding Spaniards who had gone to the Holy Land to return to their kingdom. If the hypothesis that Pedro went with Raymond to the Holy Land in the Spanish entourage of his wife, then it is probable that Pedro returned to Europe with Elvira in the summer of 1105.

There is no contemporary evidence for Spanish participation in the First Crusade, but the late thirteenth-century Gran conquista de Ultramar refers to "a company of Spanish knights there had been" at the Siege of Nicaea in 1097, "guarding the count of Toulouse, whose chief he had nominated, Lord Pedro González the Roamer, who was a very good knight in arms, and was born in Castile." It goes on to narrate an event which supposedly took place during the Siege of Antioch (1097–98) after the horse of Robert II, Count of Flanders, was killed beneath him and he was forced to fight dismounted against a number of Turks. Two knights, one from France and the other Pedro González, came to his rescue, "but the Spaniard, who arrived first, gave such a great blow to the back of a Moor with the lance he carried in his hand that it came out his chest a cubit, and he left him dead on the ground." It is possible that the Gran conquista has confused Pedro González with the Petrum de Castillione mentioned in the Gesta Francorum as part of Raymond of Toulouse's army, and that the event at Antioch confuses Pedro with Peter Bartholomew, who had a vision at Antioch and found the Holy Lance.

== Count of Lara (1107–29) ==
By 6 May 1107 Pedro was ruling Lara with the title of Count. There is a brief notice from August 1110 that he was then ruling (tenente) Medina del Campo. While he continued to hold onto Lara, Pedro was also granted Peñafiel (1113), Palencia (1122), Torremormojón (1124), and Portillo (1125). Under Alfonso VII he ruled Dueñas and Tariego between 23 May 1127 and 13 May 1128.

In the mid-1110s, count Pedro became the lover of the reigning queen, Urraca. He became one of the most influential figures in the kingdom. Urraca bore Pedro two children: a daughter, Elvira, and a son, Fernando Pérez Furtado, so-called because he was deprived of an inheritance as a bastard. (Hurtado means "robbed" in Spanish.) Elvira married Bertrán de Risnel as arranged by her half-brother Alfonso VII. Sometime before November 1127 Pedro González married the countess Eva (Ava), the young widow of count García Ordóñez, who had ruled Nájera and been killed in the Battle of Uclés. Though traditional genealogies portray her as the daughter of Pedro Fróilaz de Traba, her non-Iberian name and that given to her eldest son (Almanric/Manrique) have led this to be rejected in favor of a French origin, perhaps as daughter of Almanric (Aymeric V), viscount of Rochechouart and one of the French barons who had answered Alfonso VI's international call for aid against the Almoravids following the Battle of Sagrajas (1086). With his wife, Pedro had several children, including four sons: Manrique, Nuño, Álvaro, and Rodrigo, and daughters Milia and Maria. Sometime before 1165 Rodrigo became the prior of the Cluniac foundation of San Salvador de Nogal and is the only known male member of the Castilian aristocracy to take holy orders in the twelfth century.

On 2 September 1125 Pedro gave his vills of Uranave and Ranedo to Santo Domingo de Silos in exchange for the monastery's properties at Arlanza and Tordueles. In 1127 Pedro and Eva conceded a fuero to the village of Tardajos and in 1128 another to Jaramillo Quemado. This last fuero has been lost, but a copy was made by Prudencio de Sandoval in the seventeenth century. It shows that the village owed the comparatively large annual sum of five silver solidi to the count for its privileges. The fuero of Tardajos was re-issued with adjustments on three subsequent occasions by either Pedro or Eva, the last being in 1147.

The last record of Pedro governing Lara dates from 2 April 1129. Within a year he would be in revolt.

== Rebellion, exile and death (1126–30) ==
Upon the accession of Alfonso VII in March 1126, the towers of León were held against him by some noblemen who preferred to be ruled by Pedro and his brother Rodrigo (presumably on behalf of Urraca and Pedro's illegitimate son) than by Alfonso. Eventually the towers were surrendered and Pedro and Rodrigo forced to make submission to the new monarch and do him homage. In 1130, after the birth of a son, Raymond, to Alfonso and his queen, Berengaria, Pedro, Rodrigo, and their supporters revolted, hoping to receive support from Alfonso I of Aragon and Navarre. Together Pedro and his son-in-law Bertrán de Risnel took the city of Palencia. Rodrigo rebelled in Asturias, one of their kinsmen, Jimeno Íñiguez, rebelled in Valencia de Don Juan, and one Pedro Díaz rebelled from his castle of Valle only to be put down by Osorio Martínez and his brother Rodrigo. In June Alfonso succeeded in taking Palencia and arresting Pedro and Bertrán. Their fiefs were confiscated and they were exiled. The remaining rebels soon came to terms.

Pedro spent his exile in the service of Alfonso of Aragon, whom he followed to the siege of Bayonne. There he was challenged to a duel by Alfonso Jordan, Count of Toulouse, the son of Raymond IV and Elvira. Alfonso permitted the duel to take place, and Pedro González was killed in the encounter.
