= Fresnillo de las Dueñas =

Coordinates: 41°39′N 3°39′W

- Municipality and town
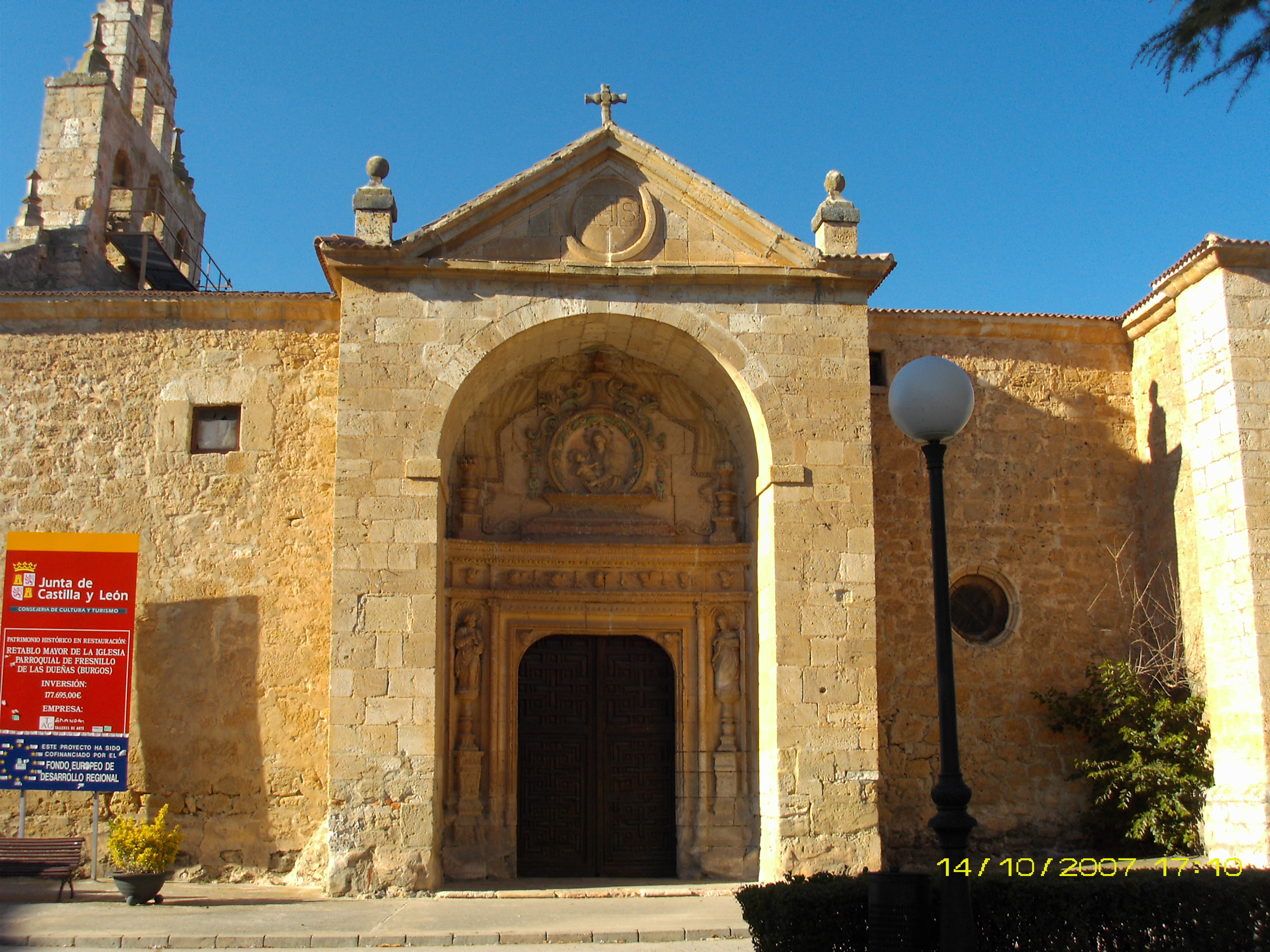
- The main facade of the church of Fresnillo de las Dueñas

- Coat of arms
- Interactive map of Fresnillo de las Dueñas
- Country: Spain
- Autonomous community: Castile and León
- Province: Burgos
- Comarca: Ribera del Duero

Area
  - Total: 14 km^{2} (5.4 sq mi)
- Elevation: 802 m (2,631 ft)

Population (2025-01-01)
  - Total: 703
  - Density: 50/km^{2} (130/sq mi)
- Time zone: UTC+1 (CET)
  - Summer (DST): UTC+2 (CEST)
- Postal code: 09417
- Website: http://www.fresnillodelasdueñas.es/

Fresnillo de las Dueñas is a municipality located in the province of Burgos, Castile and León, Spain. According to the 2004 census (INE), the municipality has a population of 349 inhabitants.

On 1 February 1095, Count García Ordóñez and his wife, Infanta Urraca Garcés, sister of Sancho IV of Navarre, granted a fuero of privileges to Fresnillo, then a part of their lordship centred on Nájera.
