= Rodrigo Martínez =

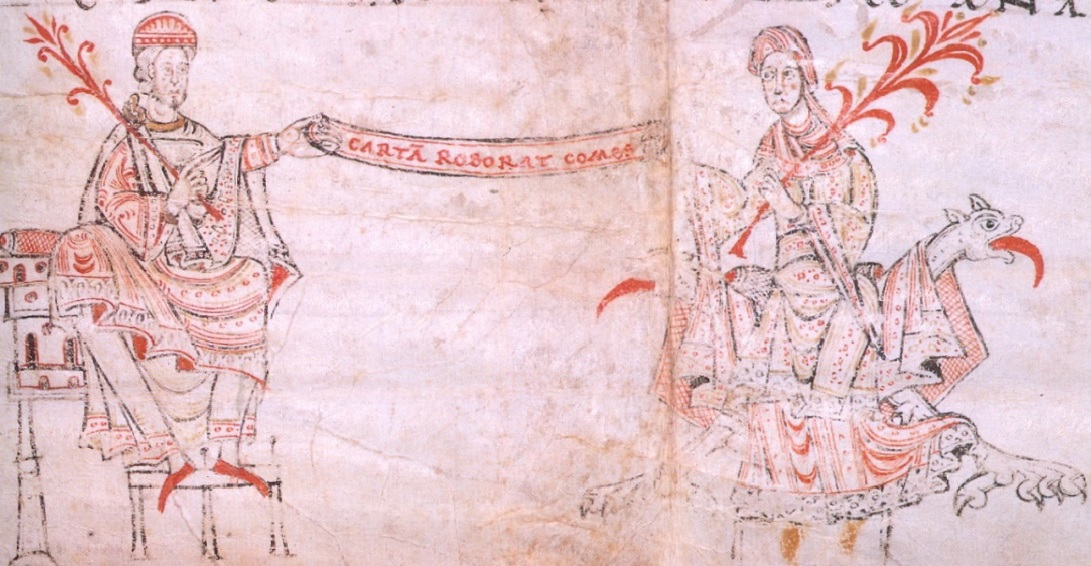
Portraits of count Rodrigo Martínez and his wife Urraca Fernández from his carta de arras.

Rodrigo Martínez (Latin: Rudericus Martini) (died July 1138) was a Leonese nobleman, landowner, courtier, military leader, governor, and diplomat, "the most powerful lay figure in the region of the western Tierra de Campos," who "emerges as far and away the most regular visitor to the court of Alfonso VII between 1127 and 1138." He was a member of the Flagínez family, rose to the highest rank in the kingdom and met his end on the battlefield.

He was the eldest son of Martín Flaínez and Sancha Fernández. Throughout his career he was closely associated with his brothers Pedro and Osorio Martínez. All three Martínez brothers met their ends on the battlefield. Martín Flaínez is known to have donated a meadow, money, and some candles to the monastery of Santa Eugenia de Cordovilla because the monks had performed a successful exorcism on the young Rodrigo.

== On behalf of the Crown: governor and diplomat ==
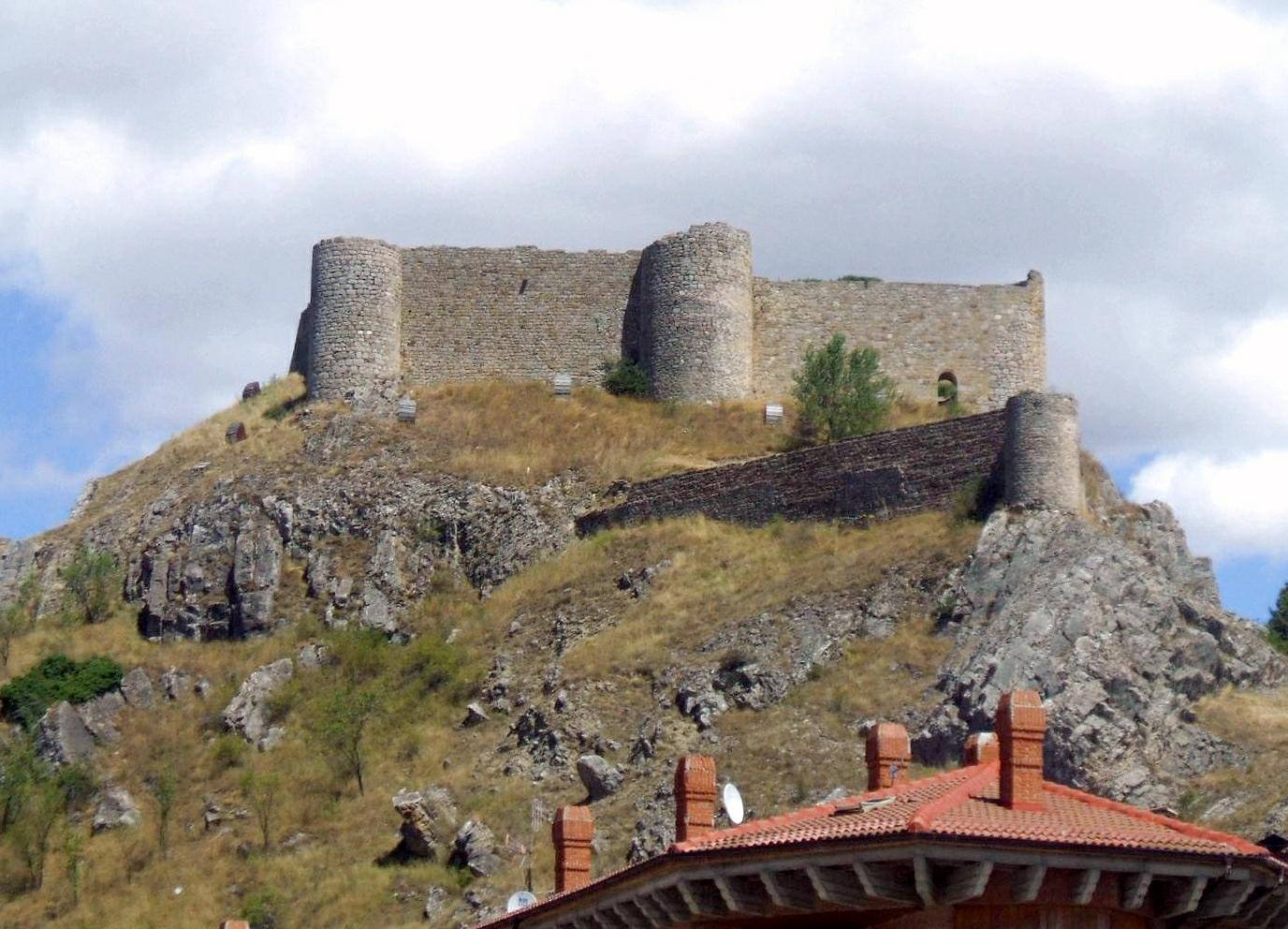
The castle of Aguilar de Campoo, one of Rodrigo's most important and longest-held fiefs.

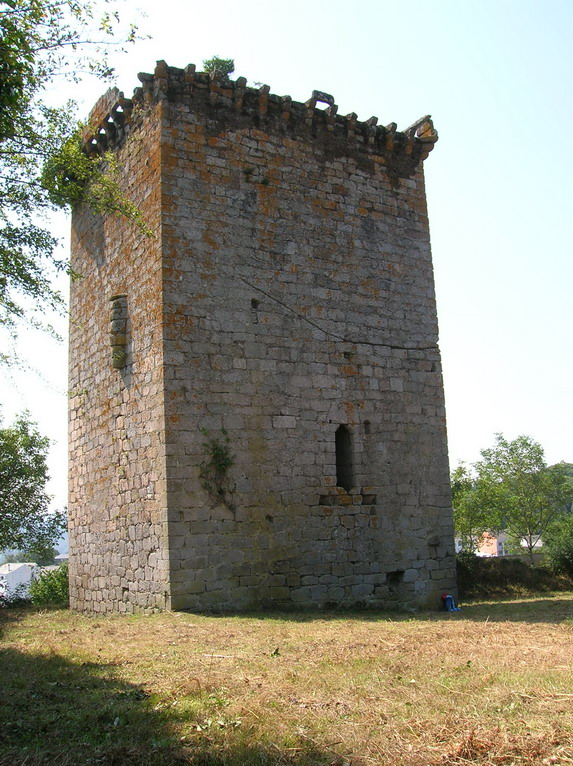
The Torre del Homenaje, all that remains of the castle at Castroverde, controlled by Rodrigo in 1117, his first tenencia.

The first record of Rodrigo's public career dates to 1 May 1110. In 1117 he was governing the tenencia of Castroverde. Between 1117 and 1136 he held the tenencia of Becilla de Valderaduey. From 1125 to 1137 he held that of Aguilar de Campoo. Queen Urraca died on 8 March 1126. When Alfonso VII finally took control of the "towers of León", the fortress that guarded the imperial capital of León, Rodrigo along with the other Leonese magnates came to do him homage. In 1134 he held that of Mayorga and in 1135 those of Atienza and Medina del Campo concurrently. In 1137 he held Calahorra, and there is a reference to him ruling Calahorra in a charter mistakenly dated to 1140. In 1136–37 he was also governing the Tierra de Campos. At some point he seems to have ruled in Grajal de Campos, since a charter of 1152 refers to both him and Ramiro Fróilaz as having held the title of potentior of Grajal. Between 1126 and 1138 he held the towers of León for the crown. From 1120 to 1126 he held the tenencia of Melgar de Arriba (or possibly Melgar de Fernamental). It is possible that in 1126 he briefly held Somoza, but the only charter referring to this is suspect. From 1123 to 1136 he ruled Villalobos. From 1132 until his death he ruled Zamora.

By the end of 1128 Rodrigo had attained comital rank. In 1129 he was employing Pedro Manga as his majordomo. Pedro would later hold the tenencias of Luna and Valencia de Don Juan from the crown. In 1131 a certain Fernando Menéndez was acting as Rodrigo's vicar in Zamora.

In 1133 Rodrigo Martínez and Gutierre Fernández de Castro led an embassy to Rueda de Jalón (Rota) to negotiate with the petty Muslim prince Sayf al-Dawla (Zafadola). They were "received honorably [and presented] with magnificent gifts." They accompanied Sayf back to León to meet with Alfonso VII. Rodrigo was rewarded by the emperor for his loyalty in June–July 1135 with some lands confiscated from the defeated Asturian rebel Gonzalo Peláez. Between 1135 and 1137 Rodrigo purchased land at Castrillo.

== Private transactions: marriage and property ==
On 7 October 1123 he made a donation to the Benedictine monastery at Sahagún. On 1 July 1131 Rodrigo donated an estate at Oteruelo to Gonzalo Alfonso and Teresa Peláez. Between 1130 and 1132 he had a dispute with Arias II, Bishop of León, over the property owned by one Pedro Peláez. On 29 March 1133 Alfonso VII granted immunity (Latin cautum, Spanish coto) to the count's estate at Castellanos. This gave Rodrigo the right to collect taxes and the profits of justice, to call upon the male denizens for military service, and to refuse entry to royal officials such as the merino and sayón.

Rodrigo married Urraca Fernández, daughter of Fernando Garcés de Hita and Estefanía Armengol. The couple was betrothed while she was no more than ten years old, at which time (21 November 1129) Rodrigo granted her a bridewealth consisting in eleven villages in the Campos Góticos. The charter, carta de arras, noting this gift is in the archives of Valladolid. In it Rodrigo refers to Urraca as Fernandi Garcie et infantisse domine Stephanie filie, "daughter of Fernando Garcés and the infantissa Doña Estefanía."

Urraca never bore him any children of whom we have record, but the couple were active in property acquisitions. Together they acquired properties scattered throughout the Campos from Carrión in the east to León in the west to Zamora in the south (de Carrione usque in Legionem et Cemorem et per totos Campos). These acquisitions (gananciales) were bought by Alfonso VII after Rodrigo's death. On 21 January 1139 the emperor granted Amusco and an estate at Vertavillo to Urraca in exchange for Manganeses and "all those purchases and gains, which she made with her husband Rodrigo Martínez" (totis illis comparationibus et gananzes, quas fecit cum marito suo Roderico Martinez). At some point after Rodrigo's death Urraca began an affair with Alfonso VII, eventually giving birth to a daughter by him, Estefanía, who married Fernando Rodríguez de Castro. Alfonso's purchase of her and Rodrigo's gananciales may have been designed to provide for this daughter. Urraca conducted a number of property transactions with Alfonso between 1139 and 1148.

== Military activities and death ==
During the rebellion of 1130 led by the González de Lara brothers, Pedro and Rodrigo, and their kinsman Bertrán de Risnel, Alfonso VII called upon Rodrigo and Osorio Martínez to attack Pedro Díaz, a supporter of the rebels, in his castle at Valle. According to the Chronica Adefonsi, Rodrigo and Osorio surrounded the castle and sent reports to Alfonso about the insults the garrison was hurling at them because of their failed assaults. The king came and the castle was taken and razed. Reportedly Pedro Díaz, upon surrendering, said to Alfonso, "My Lord and King, I stand at fault; I earnestly beg you, for the love of God who always aids you, do not hand me or my family over to Count Rodrigo. Instead, you yourself take vengeance upon me as you see fit." Rodrigo's reputation for ill treatment of his prisoners is also recorded in the Chronica:

Count Rodrigo captured other knights. He sent some of these to prison until they surrendered all their possessions to him. He made others serve him for several days without any compensation. Those who had been insulting him he yoked with oxen to plow and feed on grass like cattle. He also made them eat straw from a manger. After he had stripped them of all their riches, he allowed the pathetic prisoners to go their way.

On the orders of its rebel leader, Gimeno Íñiguez, the town of Coyanza also surrendered to the king to avoid falling into Rodrigo's hands.

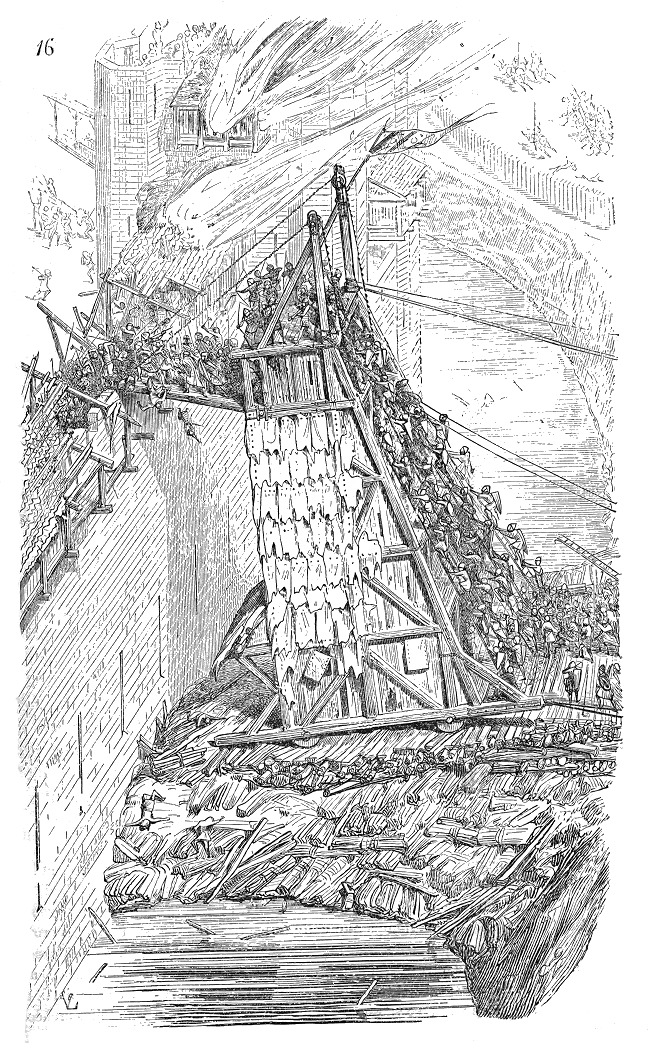
Siege tower like the one in which Rodrigo was mortally wounded.

Rodrigo died at the Siege of Coria, where he was assisting the emperor with his own knightly retinue (mesnada), in July 1138. The siege was the culmination of a summer razzia deep into al-Andalus. The razzia had begun in May under the command of Alfonso, Rodrigo Martínez, and Rodrigo Fernández de Castro. Rodrigo Martínez died during an assault on the city walls, described in the Chronica Adefonsi:

The Emperor summoned the commanders and ordered them to mobilize the war engines in preparation for the assault on the city. He left with his hunters for the mountains then in search of deer, boar and bear. In the morning the assault was begun. Consul Rodrigo Martínez himself climbed one of the wooden towers. Many knights, archers and slingers went up the tower with him. Then one of the enemy by pure chance shot an arrow at the tower which the consul had climbed. Because of our sins, the arrow hit its target on the other side of the wickerwork. The iron point of the arrow struck the neck of the Consul. It pierced his headpiece and corselet and wounded him. Nevertheless, after the Consul realized that he was wounded, he quickly grasped the point of the arrow and, removed it. At once he began to hemorrhage. Neither the conjurers nor the physicians could stop the bleeding. Finally Rodrigo said to those around him, "Take off my arms, for I am extremely disheartened." Immediately they removed his arms and carried him to his tent. Throughout the entire day they attempted to cure his wound. Around sunset all hope in medicine was lost, and he died. As soon as the news had spread through the camp, there was tremendous mourning—more than anyone had imagined. Upon returning from the mountains, the Emperor was informed of the Consul's death. He learned the cause upon entering the camp. Alfonso gathered all of his advisors, and in their presence, he appointed Osorio, Rodrigo's brother, to be consul in his place.

The siege was lifted the next day, and Rodrigo's body was immediately conducted to its burial place in León by his brother Osorio "accompanied by his own military force and by that of his brother". Rodrigo was buried in the family mausoleum beside his parents, in a church next to the Cathedral of Santa María, possibly the monastery of San Pedro de los Huertos, which his parents had received by a royal grant of Urraca of Zamora and Elvira of Toro in 1099. Osorio succeeded Rodrigo as count and received his tenencias of Aguilar, the Campos, León, and Zamora.

== Bibliography ==
- S. Barton. 1997. The Aristocracy in Twelfth-century León and Castile. Cambridge: Cambridge University Press.
- S. Barton. 2000. "From Tyrants to Soldiers of Christ: The Nobility of Twelfth-century León-Castile and the Struggle Against Islam". Nottingham Medieval Studies, 44, pp. 28–48.
- J. M. Canal Sánchez-Pagín. 1986. "El conde leonés Fruela Díaz y su esposa la navarra doña Estefanía Sánchez (siglos XI–XII)", Príncipe de Viana, 47(177), pp. 23–42.
- R. A. Fletcher. 1978. The Episcopate in the Kingdom of León in the Twelfth Century. Oxford: Oxford University Press.
- R. A. Fletcher. 1984. Saint James's Catapult: The Life and Times of Diego Gelmírez of Santiago de Compostela. Oxford: Oxford University Press.
- G. E. Lipskey. 1972. The Chronicle of Alfonso the Emperor: A Translation of the Chronica Adefonsi imperatoris. PhD thesis, Northwestern University. [Cited as CAI.]
- P. Martínez Sopena. 1985. La Tierra de Campos Occidental: poblamiento, poder y comunidad del siglo X al XIII. Valladolid.
- P. Martínez Sopena. 1990. "El conde Rodrigo de León y los suyos: herencia y expectativa del poder entre los siglos X y XII." R. Pastor ed., Relaciones de poder, de produccion y parentesco en la Edad Media y Moderna. Madrid, pp. 5–84.
- B. F. Reilly. 1982. The Kingdom of León-Castilla under Queen Urraca, 1109–1126. Princeton: Princeton University Press.
- B. F. Reilly. 1998. The Kingdom of León-Castilla under King Alfonso VII, 1126–1157. Philadelphia: University of Pennsylvania Press.
- J. de Salazar Acha. 1991. "El linaje castellano de Castro en el siglo XII: consideraciones e hipótesis sobre su origin." Anales de la Real Academia Matritense de Heráldica y Genealogía, 1, pp. 33–68.
