= Martín Flaínez =

Martín Flaínez (or Laíñez) (died May 1108) was "one of the most powerful and distinguished members" of the Leonese aristocracy during the reign of Alfonso VI (1065–1109), with which the length of his public life almost exactly coincided. From 1090 until his death he was a regular figure at the royal court, and even used the title gracia Dei comite, "count by the grace of God".

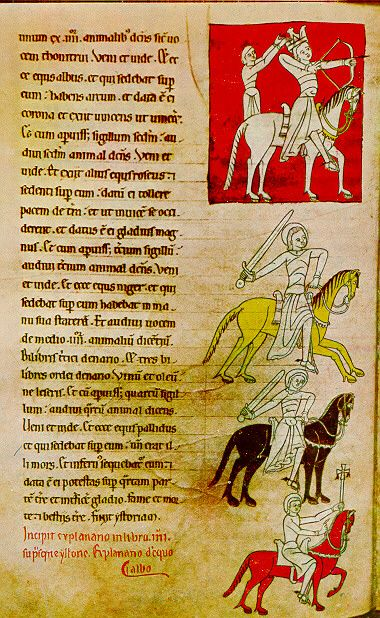
Twelfth-century depiction of Iberian cavalry: a crowned man with a bow, two knights with swords and a standard-bearer carrying a cross into battle.

Martín was a son of Flaín Fernández, son of Count Fernando Flaínez, and his second wife, Toda. The first documentary record of Martín dates to 28 May 1065, when he participated in a donation to León Cathedral. His brother Fernando, the royal alférez, fell out with the king in 1077 and was banned from court. It fell to Martín to restore the family's fortunes.

Martín married Sancha Fernández sometime before 13 November 1084, when the couple first appear beside each other in a document. Sancha was a daughter of Tegridia Gutiérrez, daughter of Gutier Alfonso. She gave him four sons, who all died in battle: Gómez, Osorio, Pedro and Rodrigo. The couple also had a daughter named for her maternal grandmother, Tegridia. There survives an interesting description of a manor house purchased by Martín and his wife sometime before 1085. It included a kitchen, pond, strawloft and threshing floor. In May 1085 they granted it to Arias Núñez for his loyal service.

On two isolated occasions before 1090—in October 1075 and December 1080, specifically—Martín is given the title comes (count), the highest in the kingdom, but he does not consistently use this title until after the summer of 1090. It is only then that his political career begins. At that time he was tenant of Aguilar, which he continued to govern on behalf of the crown until his death, although he is last cited there on 16 January 1108. Between 1 February 1091 and 7 February 1092 he received the tenancy of the castle of Simancas, which had previously been held by Pedro Alfonso. At the same time (February 1092) he appears as tenant in Cabezón. Between April 1101 to June 1107 he was tenant in San Julián, and there are brief notices of his tenancies elsewhere: Ceón in June 1104, Peñamián in May 1105 and León in December 1106.

Martín's known pious endowments are limited. He made a grant to the Benedictine monasteries of Sahagún in March 1091, and also to the regular clergy of Valladolid in February 1092. He was not always on good terms with Sahagún: in 1091 he had to defend the settlers of Villavicencio in their dispute with Sahagún. At an unknown date when his son Rodrigo was young, he made a donation of a meadow, some money and candles to the Benedictine house of Santa Eugenia de Cordovilla, whose monks, he claimed, had exorcised a demon from his son. On 22 September 1102 Martín granted some land at Torredillos to the townsmen that they might build a church.

According to Lucas de Tuy, writing his Chronicon mundi over a hundred years later, Martín was a victim of the Battle of Uclés in May 1108. A charter of the monastery of Sahagún dated 17 November 1108 cites Martín as still living, although it may contain an error in the dating clause. There is no other reference to Martín later than 31 March 1108. There is no reference to his eldest son, Gómez, after May 1107, and it is probable that he died in the same engagement as his father. He was buried in Sahagún.
