= Belinchón =

- Municipality
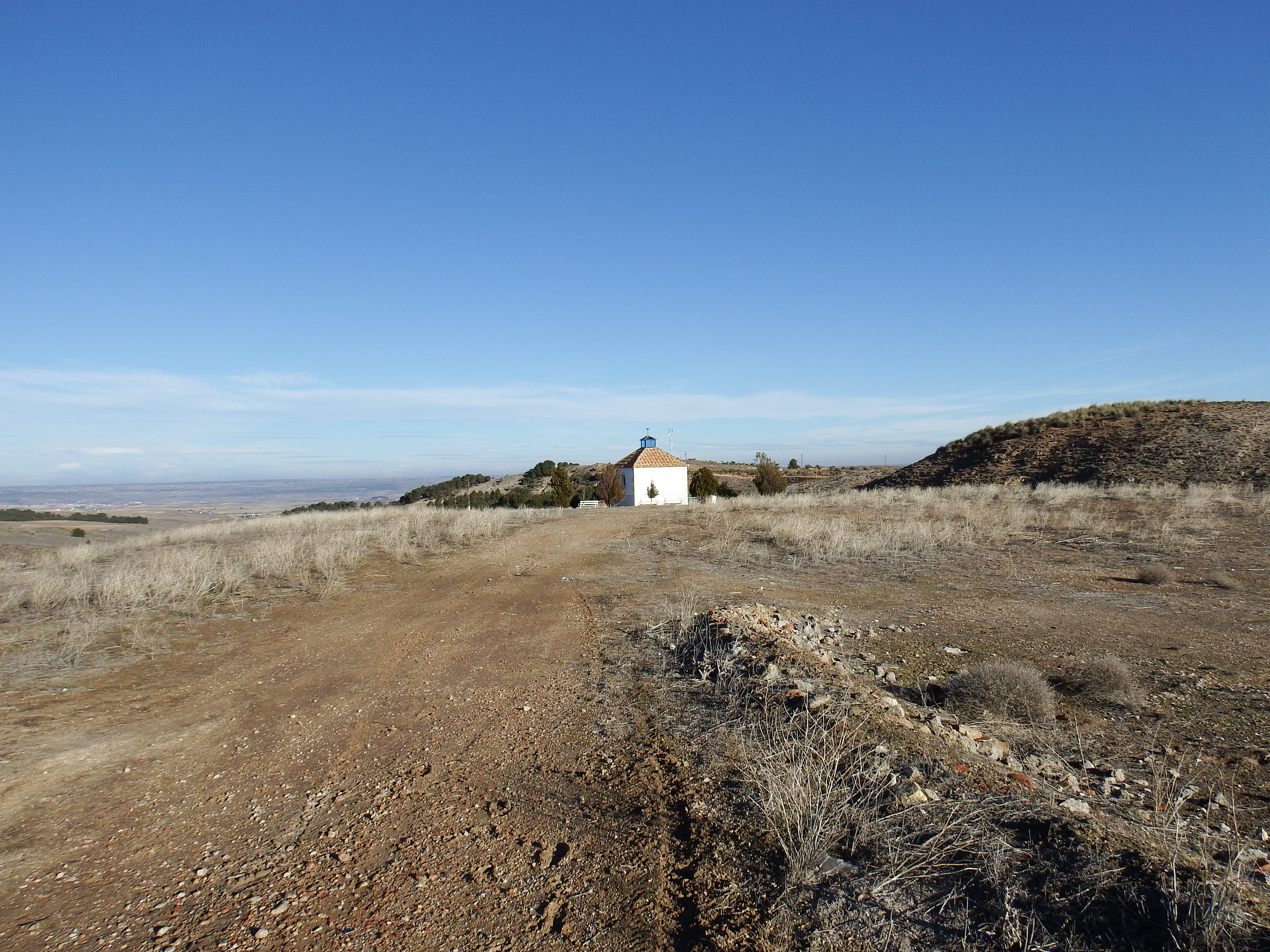

- Coat of arms

- Location in Spain
- Coordinates: 40°3′N 3°3′W
- Country: Spain
- Autonomous community: Castile-La Mancha
- Province: Cuenca
- Comarca: Mancha de Cuenca

Government
  - Mayor: Santiaga López-Loriente Amores

Area
  - Total: 79.73 km^{2} (30.78 sq mi)

Population (2025-01-01)
  - Total: 453
  - Density: 5.68/km^{2} (14.7/sq mi)
- Demonym: Belinchoneros
- Time zone: UTC+1 (CET)
  - Summer (DST): UTC+2 (CEST)
- Website: Official website

Belinchón is a municipality in Cuenca Province, Castile-La Mancha, central Spain.

Here the heir to the Castilian Crown, Sancho Alfónsez, was assassinated in a Moorish uprising on 29 May 1108.
