= Chronica Naierensis =

Late twelfth-century chronicle of universal history

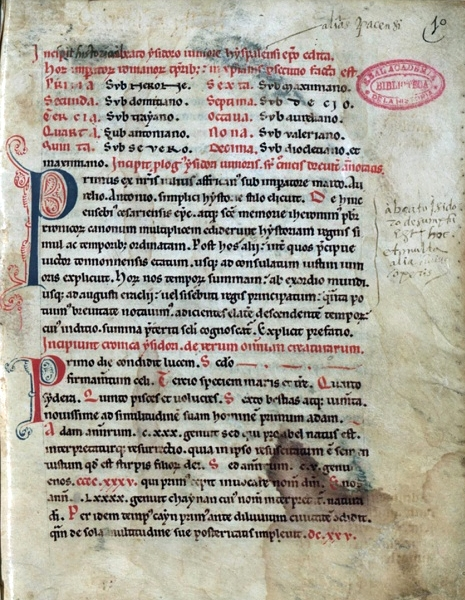

The Chronica Naierensis or Crónica najerense (originally edited under the title Crónica leonesa) was a late twelfth-century chronicle of universal history composed at the Benedictine monastery of Santa María la Real in Nájera. In Latin it narrates events from Creation to its own time, with a focus on the Bible, classical history, the Visigothic in Spain, and the kingdoms of Castile and León. It was an important model for later Spanish Latin historiographers, notably the De rebus Hispaniae of Rodrigo Jiménez de Rada, the Chronicon mundi of Lucas de Tuy, and the Estoria de España of the patronage of Alfonso X of Castile.

Besides its classical and Biblical authorities, the Chronica Naierensis relied heavily on material culled from the cantares de gesta. The Chronica is not an original work in any rigorous sense, but rather a compilation. Its Visigothic history is based squarely on Isidore of Seville and its more recent Spanish history incorporates the Corpus Pelagianum, a work supervised by Pelagius, Bishop of Oviedo, mid-century. The date of the Chronica's completion was long dated to 1160, but the 1995 critical edition published by Juan Estévez Sola revised the terminus post quem to 1173, for it was not until that year that Pedro Coméstor finished his Historia Scholastica, which the Chronica uses as a source. The terminus ante quem of the Chronica can be placed in 1194, the earliest date for the composition of the Linage del Cid, which used it as a source. These dates make it contemporary with the Historia Roderici, though the influence of the latter in the Chronica is evident.

== Editions ==
- Antonio Ubieto Arteta (ed.), Crónica najerense. Zaragoza: Anubar, 1985. ISBN 978-84-7013-201-8.
- Juan A. Estévez Sola (ed.), Chronica Hispana saeculi XII, Pars II: Chronica Naierensis, Corpus Christianorum, Continuatio Medievalis, LXXI A. Turnhout: Brepols, 1995. ISBN 978-2-503-03714-1.
- Juan A. Estévez Sola (ed.), Crónica najerense, Clásicos Latinos Medievales y Renacentistas, 12. Tres Cantos (Madrid): Akal, 2003. ISBN 978-84-460-1668-7.
