= Uclés =

- Municipality
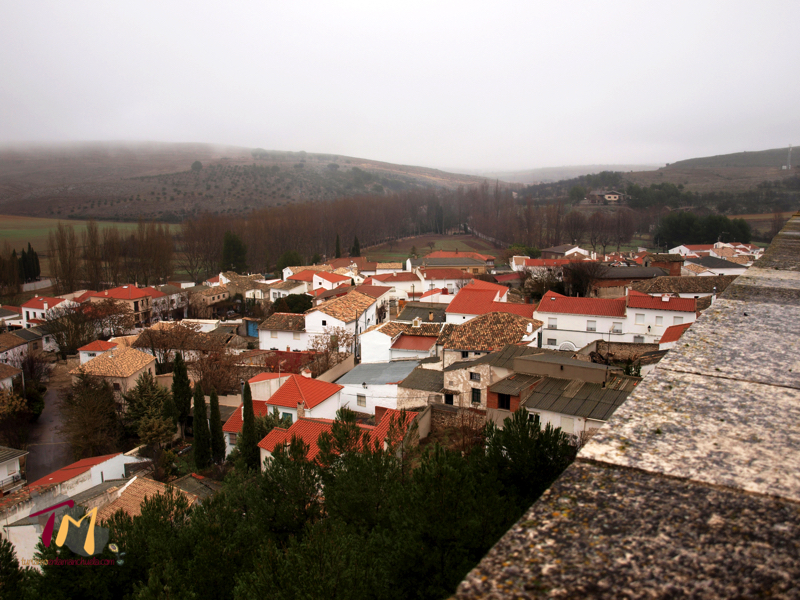
- View of Uclés

- Coat of arms

- Location within Spain Location within Castilla-La Mancha
- Coordinates: 39°58′50″N 2°51′46″W
- Country: Spain
- Autonomous community: Castilla–La Mancha
- Province: Cuenca

Area
  - Total: 64.61 km^{2} (24.95 sq mi)

Population (2025-01-01)
  - Total: 230
  - Density: 3.6/km^{2} (9.2/sq mi)
- Time zone: UTC+1 (CET)
  - Summer (DST): UTC+2 (CEST)

Uclés is a municipality of Spain located in the province of Cuenca, Castilla–La Mancha. The municipality spans across a total area of 64.61 km^{2} and, as of 1 January 2020, it has a registered population of 212.

== History ==
The fortress and town was probably built by al-Fath ibn Musa ben Zennun circa the late 9th to early 10th century, becoming the al-Fath's main stronghold after his father's death in 908. Having submitted to the Cordobese central authority by the 920s, the rebellious Banu Zennun (later arabised to 'Dhi-l Nun') clan was removed from the place by 936, although Uclés returned to their control in 1018.

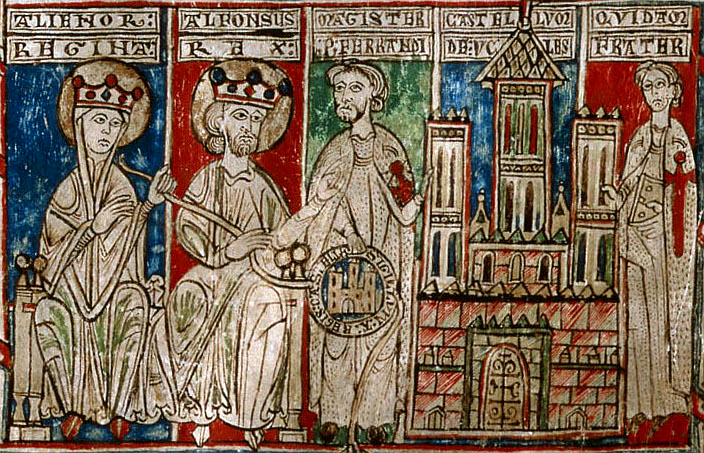
Illustration depicting the delivery of the fortress of Uclés to the Master of the Order of Santiago in 1174.

The place passed to Christian control in the wake of the conquest of the Taifa of Toledo in 1085 and then was lost a year after following the Battle of Sagrajas. The Almoravid rule consolidated after the 1108 Battle of Uclés.

Towards 1157, the fortress of Uclés was acquired in a barter by Alfonso VII from Ibn Mardanix in exchange for the fortress of Alicún. The fortress was ceded to the Order of Saint John of Jerusalem in 1163, and, following the unsuccessful repopulating efforts by the Knights Hospitallers, to the Order of Santiago on 9 January 1174. The Order's grip in the area consolidated following the 1177 takeover of Cuenca and Uclés was granted a fuero by the order's Grand Master in 1179, henceforth becoming the seat of an encomienda and the headquarters of the order in the Kingdom of Castile.

== See also ==
- Uclés (DO)
- List of municipalities in Cuenca
