= Crónicas anónimas de Sahagún =

The Crónicas anónimas de Sahagún are two short chronicles composed by the monks of Sahagún two centuries apart. They survive only in sixteenth-century Spanish translations.

The first is a catalogue of the excesses of the middle and upper class of Sahagún between the years 1109 and 1117. Perhaps it was designed to be presented at the Council of Burgos in the latter year. If an early-twelfth-century provenance is correct then it must have originally been written in medieval Latin. It is a useful source of detail for the early reign of Urraca of León and Castile, since the monastery at Sahagún was the most important in her realms. The second chronicle, written in the fourteenth century, may have been either originally Latin or originally Spanish. It is generally of little use to the historian.

== Editions ==
- Antonio Ubieto Arteta, ed. 1987. Crónicas Anónimas de Sahagún. Textos Medievales, 75. Zaragoza: Anubar Ediciones.
- Julio Puyol y Alonso, ed. 1920. "Las crónicas anónimas de Sahagún." Boletín de la Real Academia de la Historia, 76:7–26, 111–22, 242-57, 339–56, 395–419, 512–19; and 77:51–59, 151–92.
