= De rebus Hispaniae =

13th century book by Rodrigo Jiménez de Rada

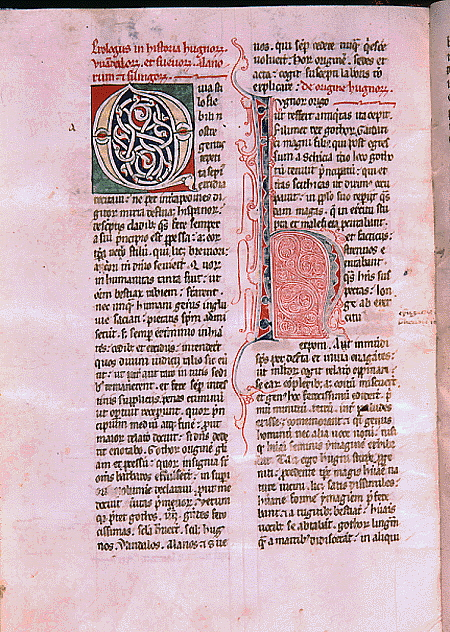
Manuscript of De rebus

De rebus Hispaniae or Historia gothica is a history of the Iberian Peninsula written in Latin by Archbishop of Toledo Rodrigo Jiménez de Rada in the first half of the thirteenth century on behalf of King Ferdinand III of Castile.

De rebus Hispaniae consists of nine books that contain the history of the peninsula from the first peoples to the year 1243. For the first time in Spanish historiography, Jiménez de Rada used sources from Al Andalus and developed a view of all the peninsular territories including the kingdoms of Aragon, Navarre, Portugal, Castile, León and León's predecessor the Kingdom of Asturias. The book dedicates a large section to the dominion of the Visigothic Kingdom; the chapter entitled, historia gothica, is very extensive and detailed. Other sections cover the other different peninsular peoples: Romans, Ostrogoths, Huns, Vandals, Suebi, Alans, Arabs, etc.

This work was widely accepted and was translated into most of the Romance languages. Over the centuries it has been a crucial source for the study of the History of Spain.

== Editions ==
- Historia de los hechos de España. Introduction, translation, notes and indices by Juan Fernández Valverde. Madrid: Alianza Editorial, 1989.
