= Lucas de Tuy =

Leonese cleric and intellectual (died 1249)

Lucas de Tui (or O Tudense) (died 1249) was a Leonese cleric and intellectual, remembered best as a historian. He was Bishop of Tuy from 1239 until his death.

Born in León, Lucas was a canon of San Isidoro there between 1221 and 1239. While a canon he wrote De Miraculis Sancti Isidori in defence of Isidore of Seville. He also travelled extensively: to Rome, Constantinople, Cyprus, Jerusalem, Armenia, and France. He visited all four of the Holy Nails: in France, Constantinople, Nazareth, and Tarsus. In 1233 or 1234 he passed Easter in Rome and completed his tract De altera vita fideique controversiis adversus Albigensium errores against the Cathars, taking inspiration mainly from Isidore and Jerome.

In 1236, upon a request from Queen Berenguela, he composed the Chronicon mundi, a four-part chronicle of world history and his magnum opus. Beginning with Creation and ending in 1236, the Chronicon aspired to give comprehensive coverage to two topics: the world and the Spains. Lucas' principal sources are Isidore, John of Biclar, Hydatius, Orosius, the Chronicle of Alfonso III, the Crónica Silense, and Sampiro. Lucas does contain a few historical titbits which are found nowhere else, but he is not generally regarded as reliable in this regard.

In 1239 he was made bishop of Tuy, and there he died ten years thence.

== Bibliography ==
- Davis, Gifford (1935). "The Development of a National Theme in Medieval Castilian Literature." Hispanic Review, 3:2 (April), pp. 149–161.
- Falque, Emma (2002). "Lucas de Túy y Rodrigo Jiménez de Rada: diferencias y similitudes en la narración histórica." Colloquium: Rodrigue Jiménez de Rada (Castille, 1ère moitié du XIIIème siècle) : histoire, historiographie, University of Salamanca.
- Falque, Emma (2003). Lucae Tudensis Chronicon Mundi. Corpus Christianorum: Continuatio Mediaevalis, LXXIV. Turnhout: Brepols.
- Fraker, Charles F. (1978). "Alfonso X, the Empire and the Primera crónica." Bulletin of Hispanic Studies, 55:2 (April), pp. 95–103.
- Franklin, Albert B. III (1937). "A Study of the Origins of the Legend of Bernardo del Carpio." Hispanic Review, 5:4 (October), pp. 286–303.
- Gilbert, Creighton (1985). "A Statement of the Aesthetic Attitude around 1230." Hebrew University Studies in Literature and the Arts, 13:2, pp. 125–151.
- Gutiérrez, M. T.; Trobajo, A. (1993). "The Ends in Lucas de Tuy's «Book of the Miracles»." Studium legionense, 34, pp. 241–268.
- Roth, Norman (1976). "The Jews and the Muslim Conquest of Spain." Jewish Social Studies, 38:2 (Spring), pp. 145–59.
- Roth, Norman (1981). "Jews and Albigensians, in the Middle Ages: Lucas of Tuy on Heretics in León." Sefarad, 41:1, pp. 71–94.
- Russell, J. C. (1938). "Chroniclers of Medieval Spain." Hispanic Review, 6:3 (July), pp. 218–235.
