= Oveco =

Oveco is a masculine given name from the Iberian Peninsula. It was most commonly used in northwestern Iberia. Its etymology is uncertain. A connection to the place name Oviedo has been suggested. A connection to Latin ovis (sheep) is unlikely. It is probably of pre-Roman origin, being either Iberian or, most likely, Celtic. A connection to Basque hobe (better) has been proposed, which would suggest a Christian name similar to Agathos or Bonus.

The name was unpopular by the 13th century. The standard patronymic forms were Ovéquiz and Ovecoz.

Bearers of the name include:

- Oveco (bishop of Tui) (932–936)
- Oveco Núñez (died 951), bishop of León
- Oveco (bishop of Oviedo) (died 957/8)
- Oveco Vermúdez (11th century), father of Vela Ovéquiz, Bermudo Ovéquiz and Rodrigo Ovéquiz
