= Diego Fernández of Oviedo =

Count of Asturias

Diego Fernández (fl. 1020 – c. 1046 (Note: Count Diego died before 24 July 1046 when his daughter Onneca Díaz and her husband Gundemaro Iohannes appear in a charter from the Cathedral of Oviedo as executors of his will.)), also known as Diego Fernández de Oviedo, was a member of one of the most noble lineages of the Kingdom of León as the son of Fernando Flaínez and Elvira Peláez, daughter of count Pelayo Rodríguez. He was the second cousin of King Ferdinand I since both shared the same great-grandfather, Count Fernando Bermúdez de Cea. Distinguished with the title of Count at an early age, Diego was the father of Jimena Díaz, wife of Rodrigo Díaz de Vivar El Cid.

== Marriages and issue ==
Count Diego first married Elvira Ovéquiz, daughter of Count Oveco Sánchez and Countess Elo, who gave him two daughters:

- Onneca Mayor Díaz the wife of Gundemaro Iohannes (Ibáñez)
- Aurovita Díaz, married to Munio Godestéiz, (Note: In a charter from the Monastery of San Vicente in Oviedo dated 4 December 1083, Fernando and his brother, Count Rodrigo Díaz, donated the villa known as Sancti Petri, for the redemption of their souls. They mention that part of this property had been acquired by their sister, Aurovita Díaz, as part of the dowry given to her by her husband Munio Godestéiz.)most probably the Muño Gustioz mentioned in the Cantar de Mio Cid who would have been the brother-in-law of Jimena Díaz who fought along with El Cid and accompanied Jimena during her widowhood.

His second wife, probably named Cristina, was a daughter of Fernando Gundemáriz and granddaughter of Gundemaro Pinióliz. The documented offspring of this marriage were:

- Rodrigo Díaz, count in Asturias, who, according to the charters in the Monastery of San Juan de Corias, could have married a Gontrodo with whom he had two daughters, Sancha a Mayor Rodríguez.
- Fernando Díaz, one of the most powerful magnates of his period, who first married Godo Gonzalez Salvadórez and then Enderquina Muñoz, daughter of Count Munio González.
- Jimena Díaz, the wife of El Cid.

== Bibliography ==
- Fernández, S.J., Luis (1967). Colección diplomática de la Abadía de Santa María de Benevívere (Palencia) 1020–1561. Madrid: Escuela Gráfica Salesiana. OCLC 644416533.
- Martínez Díez, Gonzalo (2005). El Condado de Castilla (711–1038): la historia frente a la leyenda (in Spanish). Valladolid. ISBN 84-9718-275-8.
- Martínez Sopena, Pascual (1990). "El conde Rodrigo de León y los suyos: herencia y expectativa del poder entre los siglos X y XII". Relaciones de poder, de producción y de parentesco en la Edad Media y Moderna: aproximación a su estudio (in Spanish). pp. 51–84. ISBN 978-84-00-07044-1.
- Montaner Frutos, Alberto, ed. (2011). Cantar de mio Cid (in Spanish). Barcelona: Galaxia Gutenberg; Real Academia Española. ISBN 978-84-8109-908-9.
- Pérez, Mariel (2009). "Estrategias de alianza y reproducción social en la aristocracia medieval leonesa: los Fláinez (siglos X-XI)" (PDF). Mirabilia: Revista Eletrônica de História Antiga e Medieval (in Spanish) (9): 89–107. ISSN 1676-5818.
- Salazar y Acha, Jaime de (1996–1997). "Los Osorio: un linaje de más de mil años al servicio de la corona". Anales de la Real Academia Matritense de Heráldica y Genealogía (in Spanish) (IV): 143–185. ISSN 1133-1240.
- Torres Sevilla-Quiñones de León, Margarita Cecilia (1999). Linajes nobiliarios de León y Castilla: Siglos IX-XIII (in Spanish). Salamanca: Junta de Castilla y León, Consejería de educación y cultura. ISBN 84-7846-781-5.
- Torres Sevilla-Quiñones de León, Margarita Cecilia (2000–2002). "El linaje del Cid" (PDF). Anales de la Universidad de Alicante. Historia Medieval (in Spanish) (13): 343–360. ISSN 0212-2480. Archived from the original (PDF) on 2013-10-17.
