= Sancho Ordóñez (count) =

Sancho Ordóñez (before 1042 (Note: He was already alive in 1042 when his parents, on September 18 of that year, appear with their children, mentioned as Bermudo, Sancho Fernando, and Jimena Ordoñez, making a donation to the Monastery of Santa María that they had founded in León.'"`UNIQ--ref-00000000-QINU`"')– c. 1080), was a count who lived in the 11th century. His father was Ordoño Bermúdez, an illegitimate son of King Bermudo II of León, and his mother was Fronilde Peláez, also a member of the high nobility as the daughter of Count Pelayo Rodríguez and his wife Gotina Fernández de Cea, daughter of Count Fernando Bermúdez de Cea and sister of Jimena, the mother of King Sancho Garcés III the Great, and of Justa Fernández, married to Count Flaín Muñoz.

== Biographical sketch ==
He was named count between 1059 and 1061 when he appears with the title in several family transactions and royal charters, such as one dated 1061 at the Monastery of Samos when he confirms as Sanctius proles Ordonii comes (Sancho, son of Ordoño, count). Count Sancho was a member of the Curia regis of his cousins King Fernando I and Sancha of León and in 1059 confirmed a private transaction between these monarchs and Fronilde Ovéquiz. (Note: Sancho Ordóñez was a first cousin of Queen Sancha, both of them grandchildren of King Bermudo II, and a second cousin of King Fernando I, both being descendants of Urraca Fernández, a daughter of Fernán González, count of Castile.) He also appears in charters issued by King Alfonso VI, including one dated 1071 when he confirms as Sancio Ordoniz comes a donation made by the king to Velasco Vela, and in 1073 at the Monastery of Samos when the king named him one of the judges entrusted with settling a dispute between the abbot of the monastery and Ero Peláez. In 1077, Count Sancho donated the properties in Villarín de Campos that he had inherited from his grandfather, count Pelayo Rodríguez, to the Cathedral of León.

== Marriage and issue ==
Before 1082, Count Sancho married Onneca (also appears as Onega) Ovéquiz, daughter of Count Oveco Bermúdez and his wife Elvira Suárez, and sister of counts Bermudo, Vela, and Rodrigo Ovéquiz. The offspring of this marriage were:

- Oveco Sánchez (died c. 1116), count, married Elvo Álvarez before 1085, with issue;
- Bermudo Sánchez, mentioned by his mother and brother Vela in a charter from the Cathedral of Lugo;
- Vela Sánchez (died before 1109); (Note: His siblings Oveco and Jimena appear in the Cathedral of León in 1109 making a donation in memory of their brother Ueila Sanxis.'"`UNIQ--ref-0000000E-QINU`"')
- Fronilde Sánchez (died before 1108), (Note: In 1108, her brother Oveco made a donation to the Monastery of Samos for the soul of his sister domna Fronilli.'"`UNIQ--ref-00000010-QINU`"') the wife of Count Nuño Velázquez. One of their sons, Melendo Núñez, was the father of Nuño Meléndez, the first husband of Queen Urraca López de Haro, and their firstborn, Count Alfonso Núñez, was the father of Teresa Alfonso, wife of Egas Moniz, the tutor of King Afonso I of Portugal. They were also the parents of Sancho Núñez who married Infanta Sancha Henriques, daughter of Henry, Count of Portugal; (Note: On 15 July 1129, Sancho Núñez and his wife, together with his brother Melendo Núñez, sold several properties to the Monastery of Ferreira de Pantón.'"`UNIQ--ref-00000014-QINU`"')
- Jimena Sánchez, who appears as of August 10, 1093, as a nun at the Cistercian monastery of San Salvador in Ferreira de Pantón. Her filiation is attested in a charter dated January 26, 1108 when she declares herself the daughter of Count Sancho and granddaughter of Ordoño Bermudez, and makes a donation of some of her estates in Sarria, Lemos and Asma, which was confirmed by King Alfonso VI and by several bishops.

== Bibliography ==
- Fernández de Viana y Vieites, José Ignacio (1994). Colección diplomática del Monasterio de Santa María de Ferreira de Pantón (in Spanish). Lugo: Excma. Diputación Provincial. ISBN 84-8192-061-4.
- López Morán, Enriqueta (2005). "El monacato femenino gallego en la Alta Edad Media (Lugo y Orense) (Siglos XIII al XV)" (PDF). Nalgures (in Spanish). No. II. A Coruña: Asociación Cultura de Estudios Históricos de Galicia. pp. 49–142. ISSN 1885-6349. Archived from the original (PDF) on 2011-02-06.
- Salazar y Acha, Jaime de (1985). Una Familia de la Alta Edad Media: Los Velas y su Realidad Histórica (en Estudios Genealógicos y Heráldicos) (in Spanish). Asociación Española de Estudios Genealógicos y Heráldicos. ISBN 84-398-3591-4.
- Sánchez Candeira, Alfonso (1999). Rosa Montero Tejada (ed.). Castilla y León en el siglo X, estudio del reinado de Fernando I (in Spanish). Madrid: Real Academia de la Historia. ISBN 978-84-8951241-2.
- Torres Sevilla-Quiñones de León, Margarita Cecilia (1999). Linajes nobiliarios de León y Castilla: Siglos IX-XIII (in Spanish). Salamanca: Junta de Castilla y León, Consejería de educación y cultura. ISBN 84-7846-781-5.
