= Ordoño Bermúdez =

Illegitimate son of Bermudo II

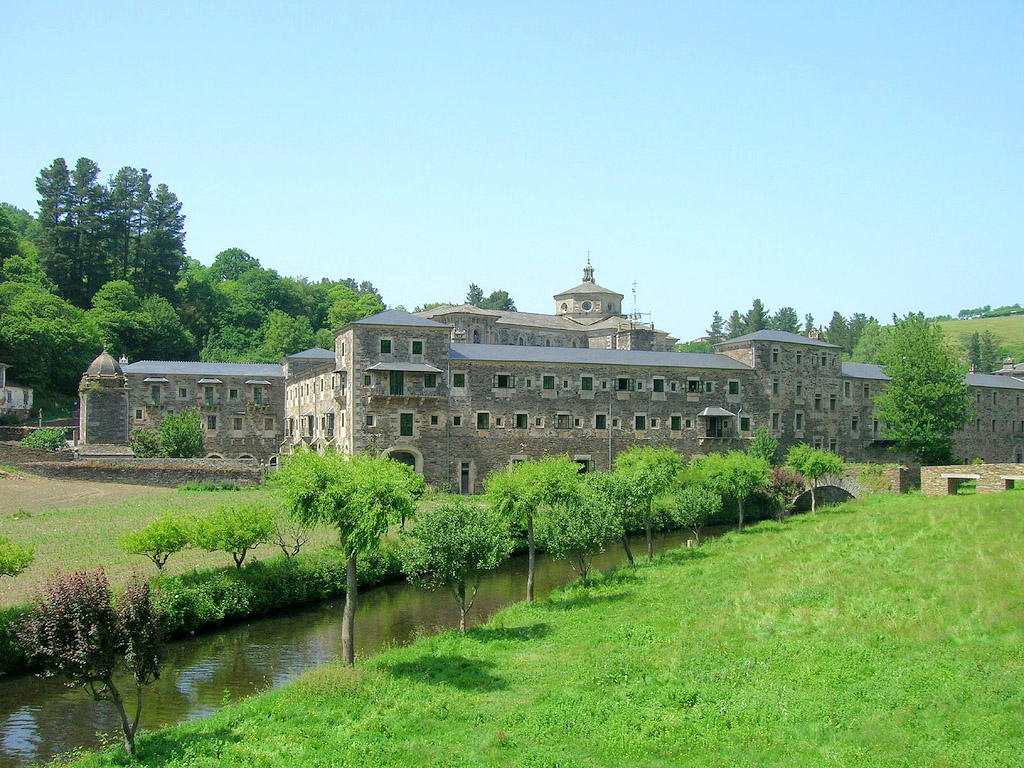
Monastery of San Xulián de Samos

Ordoño Bermúdez or Ordoño Vermúdez (fl. 1001–1042) was one of the sons that King Bermudo II of León had out of wedlock. Although the name of his mother is not known, she was probably a member of the nobility of Galicia as suggested in a document from the Monastery of Samos, where his descendants and those of the Vela-Ovéquiz family shared a common inheritance based on a linea consaguinitatis (bloodline).

== Biographical sketch ==
A relevant member of the curia regis until at least 1032, Ordoño first appears in medieval documentation in 1001 when he served as a witness in a legal dispute involving count Rodrigo Romániz and Jimena Jiménez. He started to confirm royal charters in 1024 as the mayordomo mayor of his brother King Alfonso V of León. After the king's death in Viseu in 1028, Ordoño appears in 1029 exercising the same function in the court of his nephew, King Bermudo III.

== Marriage and issue ==
Ordoño married Fronilde Peláez, daughter of the rebellious count Pelayo Rodríguez and Gotina Fernández, daughter of Fernando Bermúdez de Cea. This marriage gave rise to the lineage of the Ordóñez, one of the most important ones in medieval Galicia. In 1042, Ordoño and Fronilde made a donation to the Monastery of Santa María Virgen in León, accompanied by the children who were still alive at that date who confirmed the charter as: Ueremundo Ordoniz, Sanctio Ordoniz et Fredenando Ordoniz et Xemena Ordoniz. The seven children born of this marriage were:

- Bermudo Ordóñez, who married Sancha Ériz.
- Afonso Ordóñez (died before 1042), count.
- Pelayo Ordóñez (died before 1042), married to Corexia with whom he had one daughter, Marina Peláez who became a nun.
- Sancho Ordóñez (died c. 1080), count, married to Onecca Ovéquiz, daughter of Oveco Bermúdez and his wife Elvira Suárez. They had several children, including Count Oveco and Fronilde Sánchez, the latter married to count Nuño Velázquez, parents of several children, including count Alfonso Núñez.
- Fernando Ordóñez (died c. 1059), husband of Fronilde Gutiérrez, daughter of count Gutierre Alfonso.
- Oveco Ordóñez (died before 1042).
- Jimena Ordóñez (died before 1074), was the first wife of Muño Rodríguez, son of count Rodrigo Romániz and countess Elvira Rodríguez. After Elvira's death, Muño married Ilduara Velázquez.

== Bibliography ==
- Salazar y Acha, Jaime de (1989). "Los descendientes del conde Ero Fernández, fundador del Monasterio de Santa María de Ferreira de Pallares". El Museo de Pontevedra (in Spanish) (43): 67–86. ISSN 0210-7791.
- Sánchez Candeira, Alfonso (1999). Rosa Montero Tejada (ed.). Castilla y León en el siglo X, estudio del reinado de Fernando I (in Spanish). Madrid: Real Academia de la Historia. ISBN 978-84-8951241-2.
- Torres Sevilla-Quiñones de León, Margarita Cecilia (1999). Linajes nobiliarios de León y Castilla: Siglos IX-XIII (in Spanish). Salamanca: Junta de Castilla y León, Consejería de educación y cultura. ISBN 84-7846-781-5.
