= Bermudo Ovéquiz =

Bermudo Ovéquiz (fl. 1044–1092) (also known as Vermudo) was a member of the highest ranks of the nobility of Asturias, León, and Galicia who lived in the 11th century.

== Biographical sketch ==
Bermudo Ovéquiz was the first-born son of Oveco Bermúdez and his wife Elvira Suárez. His paternal grandparents were Bermudo Vélaz—a descendant of Count Bermudo Núñez—and Elvira Pinióliz. His mother was granddaughter of rebel Rodrigo Romániz, nephew of Count Suero Gundemáriz, (Note: Based on her patronym, the name of Elvira's father was Suero, but the precise nature of the relationships among Elvira, Rodrigo Romániz and Suero Gundemáriz is reconstructed differently by various scholars. Salazar y Acha would make Elvira paternal granddaughter of Rodrigo, with an obscure Suero Rodríguez as the intervening generation. He then accepts Rodrigo Romániz as nephew of Suero Gundemáriz. Torres Sevilla initially would have made Elvira daughter of Suero Gundemáriz by his wife Teodegonza "Guncina", who then must have been daughter of Rodrigo Romániz. She suggests that Rodrigo was only a kinsman, and not specifically nephew of Suero Gundemáriz. In this she is followed by Calleja Puerta. Such a reconstruction would contradict the accepted identification of Teodegonza as daughter of Count Jimeno Díaz and his wife Adosinda Gutiérrez. However, later in the same work, Torres Sevilla reached a different conclusion, that Rodrigo Romániz, nephew of Suero Gundemáriz, had a daughter Aragonta Rodríguez, who by an otherwise unknown nobleman named Suero she had Elvira Suárez.) and she also descended from Osorio Gutiérrez, known as the "holy count". Bermudo lived in Asturias where he probably inherited properties from his grandmother Elvira Pinióliz. He is first recorded in medieval charters in 1045 and appears in 1053 confirming a donation by King Ferdinand I of León to the Monastery of San Pelayo in Oviedo. In 1075, he and his brother Vela Ovéquiz were engaged in a legal dispute with the bishop of Oviedo on account of the Monastery of Tol. This monastery had been donated previously to the Cathedral of Oviedo by Gontrodo Gundemáriz, daughter of Count Gundemaro Pinióliz. Other relatives were also involved in this dispute, including Count Fernando Díaz and his sister Jimena, the wife of Rodrigo Díaz de Vivar, El Cid. One of his sisters, Onecca, was the wife of Count Sancho Ordóñez. Even though he did not hold the title of count, he acted as the judge in a legal proceeding in 1087 involving the abbot of the monastery of Lorenzana and the bishop of Mondoñedo.

== Marriage and issue ==
Married to Jimena Peláez, daughter of Count Pelayo Froilaz "the Deacon" and countess Aldonza Ordóñez, daughter of the Infantes Ordoño Ramírez and Cristina Bermúdez, the offspring of this marriage were: (Note: Bermudo appears, for example, in 1092 confirming a document as:...Ueremudus Ouequiz cum filiis suis Suarius, Adefonsus et Guterrius, and his son Suero also confirms various charters with his two brothers...cum fratribus suis Adefonsus et Guterius.)

- Suero (fl. 1086–12 August 1138), count and one of the most powerful and relevant figures in Asturias, a loyal vassal first of Raymond of Burgundy and then of the monarchs Alfonso VI, Urraca, and Alfonso VII of León.
- Alfonso Bermúdez (fl. 1092-1129), unlike his male siblings, Alfonso did not hold the title of count nor did he serve in any relevant post. His wife was Urraca Raimúndez who could have been the daughter of Infante Raymond Garcés "the Fratricide", who participated in the murder of his brother King Sancho IV of Pamplona, el de Peñalén. He and his legitimate wife were the parents of Pedro Alfonso, an Asturian magnate who dominated the region from 1139 until his death, Gonzalo, Gutierre, María, Ildonza, and Teresa Alfonso.
- Gutierre Bermúdez (fl. 1086–1130), a count, husband of Toda Pérez de Traba and the father of Count Vela Gutiérrez.
- Urraca Bermúdez (died 1132/1133), who married Count Gonzalo Ansúrez, brother of Count Pedro Ansúrez and parents of several children, including Sancha González, the wife of Fernando Pérez de Traba. In 1128, King Alfonso VII gave her some properties in San Vicente in Asturias de Santillana.
- Jimena Bermúdez, the wife of Pelayo Muñoz who had a daughter, Velasquita Peláez, married to Munio Doniz.

They could have also been the parents of Sebastián Bermúdez who does not appear in any transactions executed by his siblings but whose filiation is confirmed in Galician charters.

== Bibliography ==
- Calleja Puerta, Miguel (2001). El conde Suero Vermúdez, su parentela y su entorno social: La aristocracia asturleonesa en los siglos XI y XII (in Spanish). Oviedo: KRK Ediciones. ISBN 84-95401-68-1.
- García Álvarez, Manuel Rubén (1960). "¿La Reina Velasquita, nieta de Muniadomna Díaz?" (PDF). Revista de Guimarães (in Spanish). No. 70. Guimarães. pp. 197–230. ISSN 0871-0759. Archived from the original (PDF) on 2013-10-06.
- Salazar y Acha, Jaime de (1985). "Una Familia de la Alta Edad Media: Los Velas y su Realidad Histórica". Estudios Genealógicos y Heráldicos (in Spanish). Madrid: Asociación Española de Estudios Genealógicos y Heráldicos. ISBN 84-398-3591-4.
- Salazar y Acha, Jaime de (1989). "Los descendientes del conde Ero Fernández, fundador de Monasterio de Santa María de Ferreira de Pallares". El Museo de Pontevedra (in Spanish) (43): 67–86. ISSN 0210-7791.
- Torres Sevilla-Quiñones de León, Margarita Cecilia (1999). Linajes nobiliarios de León y Castilla. Siglos IX-XIII (in Spanish). Salamanca: Junta de Castilla y León, Consejería de educación y cultura. ISBN 84-7846-781-5.
