= Fernando Flaínez =

11th-century Leonese magnate

Fernando Flaínez (fl. c. 1002 – c. 1049) was a powerful magnate from the Kingdom of León, a member of the aristocratic lineage of the Flaínez. His parents were Flaín Muñoz and his wife Justa Fernández, daughter of count Fernando Bermúdez de Cea. He was the paternal grandfather of Jimena Díaz, wife of Rodrigo Díaz de Vivar El Cid, (Note: Margarita Torres Sevilla-Quiñones (2000-2002) argues that El Cid himself was nephew of Fernando, that the latter's father, Flaín Muñoz, is identical to the Laín Nuñez named by Historia Roderici as paternal grandfather of El Cid. Gonzalo Martínez Díez (2007) maintains that contemporary documents use Munio and Nuño as distinct names, and since the seemingly-complete account of Fernando's siblings does not include a Diego, El Cid's grandfather Laín Nuñez must have been a different man than Flaín Muñoz.) and the direct ancestor of the important medieval noble lineage of the Osorios. He married Elvira Peláez, daughter of Pelayo Rodríguez and Gotina Fernández de Cea, with whom he had at least seven children: Flaín, Oveco, Justa, Pedro, Pelayo, Muño and Diego. He was the tenente of Aguilar and documented with the title of count as of 1028. Jointly with his son, Flaín Fernández, he governed the city of León until 1038 when the kingdom was already under the control of King Sancho III of Pamplona.

== Biographical sketch ==
He first appears in medieval charters in 999 when, jointly with his brother Munio, he confirmed a donation by the Bishop of León to the Monastery of Sahagún. On 26 February 1020, he and his wife accompanied by several of his children founded the Monastery of San Martín de Pereda in Valle de Valdeburón which was subsequently incorporated in the Monastery of Benevívere. (Note: The children mentioned in this donation, which was also confirmed by King Alfonso V of León and his wife Elvira Menéndez, and by Infante Bermudo (later Bermudo III), were as follows and in this order: Flaín; Oveco; Pedro; Pelayo; Munio; and Diego Fernández.) In this document, he mentions that he had inherited several of the properties donated from Fredenando Uermudiz et Flanio Moniz, his grandfather and father, respectively.

As a loyal vassal of King Alfonso V of León, he appears constantly confirming royal charters and was honored with the title of count at the end of the reign of Alfonso and at least from 1028. After the death of Alfonso V and the succession to the throne by Bermudo III of León, Fernando supported his first cousin King Sancho III of Navarre. (Note: Justa Fernández, Fernando's mother, was the sister of Queen Jimena Fernández, mother of King Sancho III.) However, at first, he accompanied the young monarch as evidenced in a donation made by Bermudo III in November 1028 to the Cathedral of Santiago de Compostela where he appears with other magnates confirming the royal charter. His presence in the curia regis of King Bermudo III was infrequent from 1029 until 1035. This absence could be attributed to his involvement — active or behind the scenes — in the assassination of García Sánchez, Count of Castile in 1029 when García went to the city of León to meet Sancha, his promised bride and future wife of King Ferdinand I of León.

He was back at the court of Bermudo III to whom he remained faithful until the king was killed in the Battle of Tamarón in 1037. Fernando Flaínez did not hand over the capital of the Kingdom of León to Ferdinand I until 1038 and kept all his honors and estates until his death, after 1049, the last year in which he appears in the charters of the Monastery of Sahagún.

== Marriage and issue ==
He married his first cousin, Elvira Peláez, daughter of Count Pelayo Rodríguez and Countess Gotina Fernández, another daughter of Fernando Bermúdez de Cea, and as such, also a sister of Queen Jimena and of Justa Fernández, Fernando's mother. They were the parents of the following children, all except Justa born before February 1020, the date on which they appear confirming the donation made by their parents:

- Flaín Fernández (died before 1065), a count, husband of Toda Fernández and father of Martín Flaínez, ancestors of the Osorio;
- Oveco Fernández, married to Onecca Gutiérrez;
- Pedro Fernández
- Pelayo Fernández (died after June 1049), royal alférez in 1039 and in 1050 and count as from 1043. He could have been the father of Flaín Peláez;
- Munio Fernández (died after June 1049), also a count, married Elvira Peláez, daughter of Count Pelayo Froilaz the Deacon and Aldonza Ordóñez, daughter of the infantes Ordoño Ramírez and his wife Cristina Bermúdez. They were the parents of Countess Aldonza Muñoz, the wife of Count Vela Ovéquiz. He last appears in June 1049 with his brother Pelayo;
- Diego Fernández, the father of Jimena Díaz, wife of El Cid;
- Justa Fernández, named after her paternal grandmother, Justa was the second wife of Count Ansur Díaz and step-mother of powerful count Pedro Ansúrez On 29 September 1047, Justa and her husband founded the Monastery of San Román.

== Bibliography ==
- Fernández, Luis (1967). Colección diplomática de la Abadía de Santa María de Benevívere (Palencia) 1020–1561. Madrid: Escuela Gráfica Salesiana. OCLC 644416533.
- Martínez Díez, Gonzalo (2005). El Condado de Castilla (711–1038): la historia frente a la leyenda (in Spanish). Valladolid. ISBN 84-9718-275-8.
- Martínez Díez, Gonzalo (2007). "Ancestry of Rodrigo Díaz de Vivar". Boletín de la Institución Fernán González (in Spanish). 86 (234): 31–52.
- Martínez Sopena, Pascual (1990). "El conde Rodrigo de León y los suyos: herencia y expectativa del poder entre los siglos X y XII". Relaciones de poder, de producción y de parentesco en la Edad Media y Moderna: aproximación a su estudio (in Spanish). Editorial CSIC - CSIC Press. pp. 51–84. ISBN 978-84-00-07044-1.
- Montaner Frutos (literary editor, study, and notes), Alberto (2011). Cantar de mio Cid (in Spanish). Barcelona: Galaxia Gutenberg; Real Academia Española. ISBN 978-84-8109-908-9.
- Pérez, Mariel (2009). "Estrategias de alianza y reproducción social en la aristocracia medieval leonesa: los Fláinez (siglos X-XI)" (PDF). Mirabilia: Revista Eletrônica de História Antiga e Medieval (in Spanish) (9): 89–107. ISSN 1676-5818.
- Salazar y Acha, Jaime de (1996–1997). "Los Osorio: un linaje de más de mil años al servicio de la corona". Anales de la Real Academia Matritense de Heráldica y Genealogía (in Spanish) (IV): 143–185. ISSN 1133-1240.
- Torres Sevilla-Quiñones de León, Margarita Cecilia (1999). Linajes nobiliarios de León y Castilla: Siglos IX-XIII (in Spanish). Salamanca: Junta de Castilla y León, Consejería de educación y cultura. ISBN 84-7846-781-5.
- Torres Sevilla-Quiñones de León, Margarita Cecilia (2000–2002). "El linaje del Cid" (PDF). Anales de la Universidad de Alicante. Historia Medieval (in Spanish) (13): 343–360. ISSN 0212-2480. Archived from the original (PDF) on 2013-10-17.
