= Fernando Díaz =

Fernando Díaz (floruit 1071–1106) was a Spanish nobleman and military leader in the Kingdom of León, the most powerful Asturian magnate of the period. He held the highest rank in the kingdom, that of count (Latin comes), from at least 24 September 1089. He was the last Count of Asturias de Oviedo and was succeeded by a castellan, a novus homo, perhaps in an ecclesiastical–royal effort to curtail the power of the Asturian aristocracy.

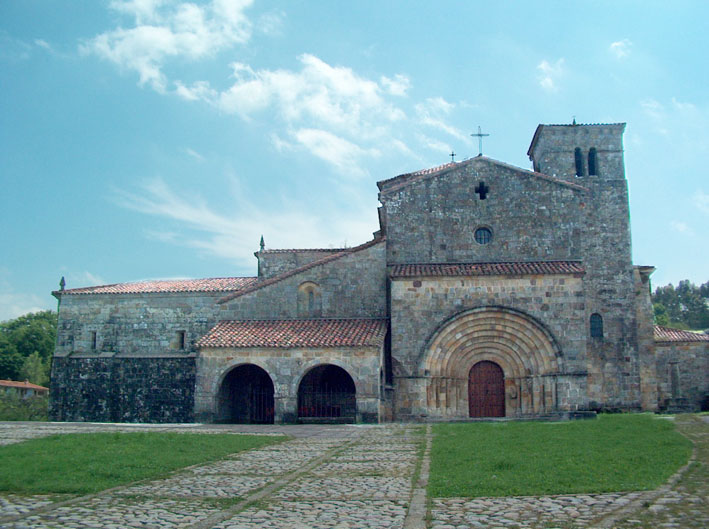
Santa Cruz de Castañeda, church passed on to Fernando's children by their aunt, Jimena Muñoz, and later donated to the Abbey of Cluny

Fernando was the second son of Diego Fernández and his second wife, Cristina Fernández, daughter of Fernando Gundemáriz and granddaughter of Gundemaro Pinióliz. His father and his elder brother Rodrigo before him were also Counts of Asturias. His younger sister Jimena was the wife of Rodrigo Díaz de Vivar, el Cid. Fernando's first wife was Goto González, the eldest daughter of Gonzalo Salvadórez and his first wife, Elvira Díaz. Goto was dead by July 1087 when Fernando, as an executor of her will, made a donation to the monastery of San Salvador de Oña of the land in Hermosilla inherited by Goto from her father and her uncle, Álvaro Salvadórez. By 31 July 1096, Fernando was married to Enderquina (Henderquina) Muñoz, a daughter of count Munio González. As her arras (special gift of a husband to a wife) she received the monastery of Santa María in Oviedo on 17 April 1097. On 20 September 1120 the "children of count Fernando and countess Lady Enderquina" made a donation of the monastery of Santa Cruz de Castañeda to the Abbey of Cluny "for the souls" of their grandfather Munio and his wife Mayor. The names of Fernando's children with Enderquina were Diego, Munio, Sancha, Jimena, Aldonza, and María.

Fernando is first mentioned in a charter kept at the monastery of San Pedro de Eslonza and dated 15 October 1071. There is a highly dubious reference to Fernando with the title of count, an act of Alfonso VI, dated 8 May 1080, but the first secure reference to Count Fernando dates to 1089. A document of 18 January 1086 preserved in the cartulary of San Vicente de Oviedo is the earliest reference to his holding the tenencia of Asturias de Oviedo, which he had until at least the 7 February 1104. In April 1098 Fernando and Enderquina donated the monasteries of San Andrés de Agüera and San Esteban de Villar de Cobos to a certain priest named Juan Peláez of Belmonte de Miranda.

According to the cartulary of the monastery of Sahagún, Fernando visited the Holy Land and Jerusalem in 1100. While this is usually taken to refer to a pilgrimage after the success of the First Crusade, it may indicate that Fernando was one of the few Spaniards who participated in the Crusade. According to the Crónicas anónimas de Sahagún, in 1101 Alfonso VI received a decorated cross made from the wood of the True Cross from the Byzantine emperor Alexius I Comnenus. The king proceeded to donate it to the monastery of Sahagún. It has been thought that Fernando probably brought the present back from Constantinople after his pilgrimage. Around 1104, Fernando and Enderquina were engaged in lawsuits with the bishop Pelagius of Oviedo concerning episcopal seignory in Asturias. These also involved Munio, the abbot of the San Juan Bautista de Corias, who had previously settled a division of serfs and properties with Fernando and Enderquina in 1097 and 1099. In 1104, Fernando and Enderquina exchanged the villa of Reconco for that of Laureda with the abbey of Corias. Fernando does not appear in any documents after 19 March 1106, and it has been speculated he died at the Battle of Uclés in May 1108.
