= History of Andalon (surname) =

The historical archives show the last name Andalon as appearing initially in Italy and Spain, and then in Mexico and the United States, respectively. Reflecting its diverse cultural history, the variations in the spelling of this surname include Andalo and Andaloni (Italian), Andallón and Andayón (Castilian Spanish), Andalón (Mexican Spanish), and Andalon (American English). On the Italian side, Andalon traces its origins to Andalo, a commune in the northern province of it:Trentino. On the Spanish side, Andalon traces its origins to Andallón, a township in the north-west coastal province of es:Asturias.

Andalon appears to be a toponym, which means to indicate a name's place of origin or to describe the distinct geographic location where it derives from. In English, Andalon is pronounced ANDA-lawn. The ANDA is emphasized and the lon is pronounced softly. In Spanish, Andalón is pronounced hAn-DA-lÓn. The h is silent, the An is slightly emphasized, the DA is stressed, and the O in lón is accentuated. English and Spanish are the official present-day articulations of this surname.

In the 12th century (1100s), there are early mentions of Andalo in northern Italy in descriptions of a historical Roman Catholic Church, its surrounding location, and the people living in the area. The historical archives show that in references to Andalo, other iterations are used, such as di Andalo, Andaloni, and Andalone. Documents from this time period highlight people identifying as such, either through their first or last names. Members of this early Italian community appear to have migrated to neighboring regions, including Asturias in northern Spain. The spelling of their main identifying name was changed to Andallón, reflecting the Asturian dialectical customs of the time and the prevalent Castilian Spanish language.

Between the 13th and 18th centuries (1200s - 1700s), there are references to Andallón in Asturias, Spain in descriptions of another historical Roman Catholic Church, its immediate environment, and the individuals inhabiting the community. The historical records show that in this part of Spain, Andallón is also referred to as Andayón. This is the case because both the Asturian dialect and Castilian Spanish language use the double ll and y interchangeably.

Starting in the 18th century (1700s) in Guadalajara in New Spain of the Americas, there are people who appear with the Andalón last name. Andallóns migrated to the Americas and the spelling of their family name changed to Andalón. One l in their name was dropped during the migration experience, reflecting the spelling customs in New Spain and the emerging Mexican Spanish vernacular. Mexico gained its independence from Spain in the early 19th century (the year 1810 was the call for independence; the year 1821 was the official declaration of independence). The historical records also indicate that Andallóns immigrated to other Spanish territories outside of the Americas. In the Americas, the presence of Andalóns continue in the early 19th century (1800s) in Guadalajara and in other central-west Mexican states.

Beginning in the late 19th century (1890s), throughout the 20th century (1900s), and currently in the 21st century (2000s), we see Andalóns immigrating to and being born in the United States. In the United States, both the accented and unaccented versions of this last name have been used.

At the present time, individuals with the last name Andalon live on the West Coast of the United States, primarily in the State of California and mostly in the City of Los Angeles and neighboring municipalities. Andalóns also live in central-west Mexico, specifically in the State of Jalisco and mainly in the City of Guadalajara, as well as in adjacent Mexican states. Over the years, they have settled in other regions of the United States and Mexico. While Andalons have lived in the United States about 100 years and in Mexico over 300 years, Italy and Spain is where they draw their early ancestry, which can be traced back several hundred years.

The subsequent section provides a detailed account of the Andalon surname after its early Italian heritage, focusing on its extensive and well-documented history in Spain, Mexico, and the United States.

In Spain, over several hundred years in es:Las Regueras, a municipality of Asturias, Andalon (or Andallón) has been used to identify a town, river, street, church, religious festival, military fortress, nobility residence, governmental palace, and Roman relic.

An early reference to Andalon is seen in 13th century Spanish historical archives documenting the existence of a church in the year 1253 named Santa Cruz de Andallón, which was located in present-day Las Regueras, Asturias. These archives also show that in the 18th and 19th centuries in the same area there was a church between the years 1711 and 1857 called Santa Maria de Andallón. Even today, in the 21st century, there exists in Las Regueras La Capilla de Santa Isabel Patrona de Andallón, which is a historical chapel where religious and community-related functions take place.

Another early reference to Andalon is seen in 14th and 15th century Spanish historical records documenting the presence of a military fortress between the 1300s and 1400s that in later years became an administrative governmental palace and a nobility residence, respectively, called El Palacio de Andallón, which was located in Las Requeras, Asturias. These records also note that in the late 19th century, around 1890, the property was converted into a fortified, two-floor, Asturian large house typical of the time. In the 21st century, specifically in 2011, El Palacio de Andallón was officially designated a historical cultural site that is to be preserved and protected by the Council of Culture of the Government of the Principality of Asturias, which is under the Spanish Ministry of Education and Culture.

In Spain, Andalon (or Andallón) is believed to be the historical site of what the Spaniards call Andalionis, a Roman villa and town that existed between the 4th and 5th century (300s - 400s). Roman relics from Andalionis including “el Mosaico de Andallón” (the Mosaic of Andallón), “la Pulsera de Andallón” (the Bracelet of Andallón), and “el Cuchillo de Andallón” (the Knife of Andallón), along with related historical accounts, are showcased at the Museo Arqueológico de Asturias (Archaeological Museum of Asturias).

Spanish archives from the early 1600s to the late 1700s document Andalon as the last name of individuals in records pertaining to township residents, church parishioners, marriages, births, baptisms, deaths, and burials. These records come from the following northern communities of Spain: Las Regueras and Oviedo, Asturias; Montemayor de Pililla, Valladolid; Pembes and Mogrovejo, Santander; and Pamplona, Navarra. In the early- to mid-1700s and through the 1800s, the last name Andalon is seen in the Americas, specifically in records concerning the inhabitants of western Spanish territories that eventually became municipalities of Mexico, including: Guadalajara, Jalisco; Encarnacion de Diaz, Jalisco; Ameca, Jalisco; Tequila, Jalisco; Jalostotitlan, Jalisco; Teuchitlan, Jalisco; and Ahualulco de Mercado, Jalisco. While not as prevalent as in the state of Jalisco, the last name Andalon also appears in the archival records of these neighboring Mexican States: Nayarit, Aguascalientes, and San Luis Potosí.

During the mid-1800s, the last name Andalon also begins appearing in official Mexican populace governmental records; that is, in non-church related records. Complementing existing Spanish Catholic Church archives, these Mexican civil documents provide information related to places of residence, parents and siblings, birth dates, marriages, baptisms, deaths, and other census-related demographics.

In the United States, primarily in the southwestern states of California and Texas, the last name Andalon appears in Government Census and Immigration Records starting in the 1890s, throughout the 1900s, and currently in the 2000s. In these records, individuals with the surname Andalon are shown as being born in the United States, as well as in official documents relating to United States - Mexico Border Crossing Information.

In summary, while Andalons have lived in the United States about 100 years and in Mexico over 300 years, Italy and Spain is where they draw their early ancestry, which can be traced back several hundred years. The varied spellings of this surname throughout history have been Andalo and Andaloni (Italian), Andallón and Andayón (Castilian Spanish), Andalón (Mexican Spanish), and Andalon (American English). Currently, the early derivations of Andalon are reflected in the Italian commune of Andalo in the northern province of Trentino and in the Spanish township of Andallón in the north-west province of Asturias. In Spain, the earlier derivation of Andalon has served as the name of a river, main street, church, religious festival, military fortress, nobility residence, governmental palace, and Roman relic.

At the present time, individuals with the last name Andalon live in on the West Coast of the United States, primarily in the State of California and mostly in the City of Los Angeles and neighboring municipalities. Andalóns continue to also live in central-west Mexico, specifically in the State of Jalisco and mainly in the City of Guadalajara, as well as in adjacent Mexican states. While not prevalent outside these geographic locations, individuals with this last name do live in other regions of the United States and Mexico.
