= Chimène (disambiguation) =

Chimène is a Sacchini opera inspired by Corneille's Le Cid.

Chimène may also refer to:

== People ==
- Chimène Badi (born 1982), also known by the mononym Chimène, French singer
- Chimène van Oosterhout (born 1964), Dutch actress and singer
- Chimene Suleyman (fl. from 2010), writer from London of Turkish Cypriot descent

== Fictional characters ==
- Chimène, character in the Pierre Corneille play Le Cid based on the historical Jimena Díaz
- Chimène, character in the Massenet opera Le Cid (opera) based on Corneille's Le Cid

== See also ==
- Jimena Díaz (c. 1046–1116), Princess of Valencia, wife and successor of El Cid
- Rodrigue et Chimène, an unfinished Debussy opera
- Chimenea
