= Courias =

- Parish
- Location within Spain
- Coordinates: 43.2°N 6.533333°W
- Country: Spain
- Autonomous community: Asturias
- Province: Asturias
- Municipality: Cangas del Narcea

Courias is one of 54 parishes in Cangas del Narcea, a municipality within the province and autonomous community of Asturias, in northern Spain. The monastery-Parador of San Juan Bautista de Courias is located there.

== Villages ==
- La Gubia
- Courias
- Retuertas
- San Pedru de Courias
- Santana
- Vaḷḷinas

=== Other settlements ===
- Basián
- Castru
- Grandiel.la
- El Palombar d'Abaxu
- El Palombar d'Arriba
- El Polvorín
- El Ribón
- La Riegla
- Veigalabá
