= Gundemaro Pinióliz =

Leonese noble (died c. 1012)

Gundemaro Pinióliz (died c. 1012), was a noble from the Kingdom of León, the ancestor of one of the most important Asturian lineages of the Middle Ages, and most likely the great-grandfather of Jimena Díaz, wife of Rodrigo Díaz de Vivar, el Cid.

== Biographical sketch ==
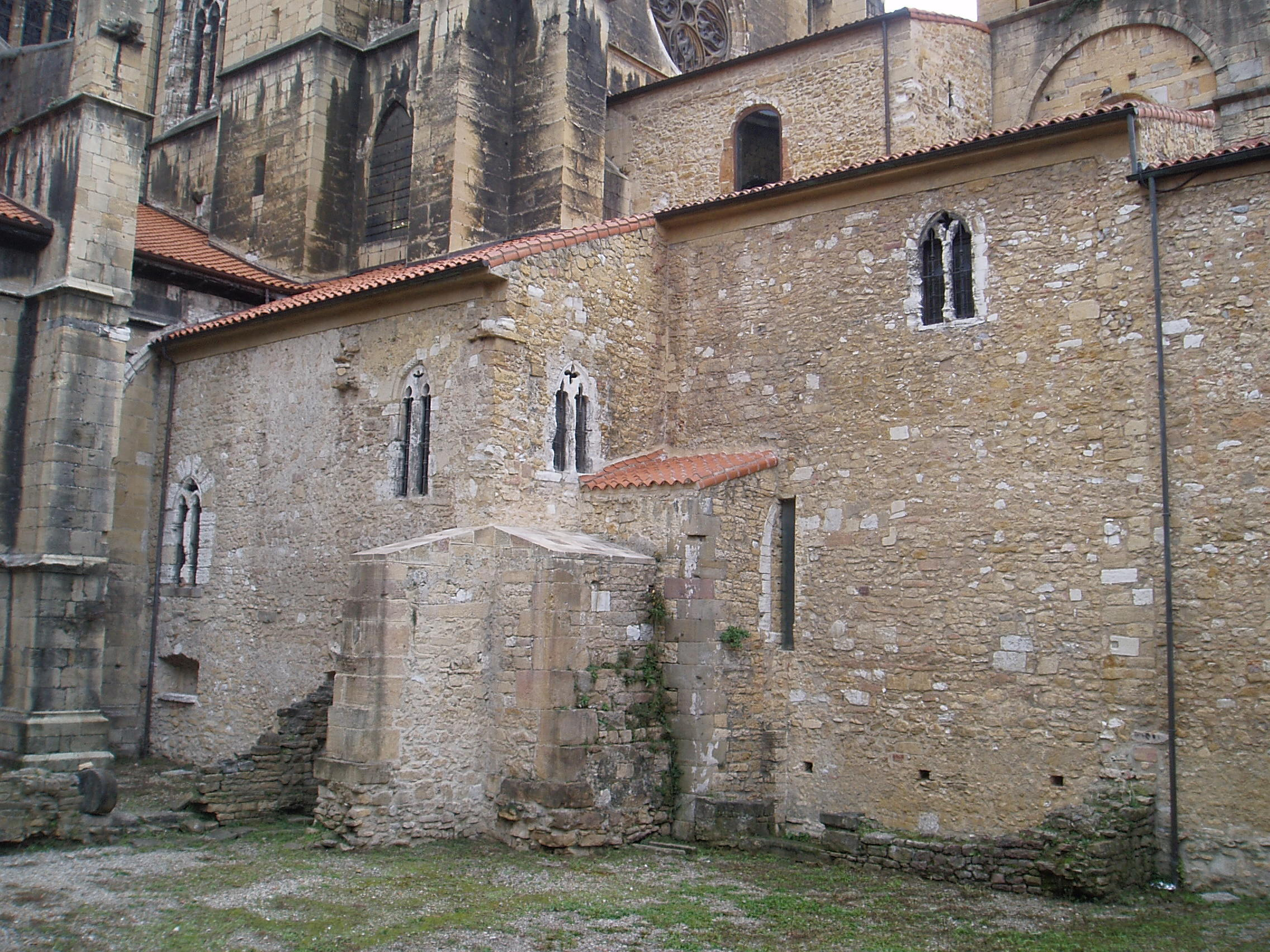
Pre-romanesque buildings of the Cathedral of Oviedo

He was the son of Piniolo Gundemáriz and Jimena Vélaz, daughter of count Vela Núñez and his wife Totilde and sister of count Fruela Vélaz. (Note: Ramón Menéndez Pidal in La España del Cid considered that he was the son of count Piniolo Jiménez. This filiation, however, is “highly improbable”.) Gundemaro had several siblings, including a sister, Elvira, married to Vermudo Vélaz, ancestors of count Suero Vermúdez. His paternal uncle was Count Suero, a notorious rebel.

He appears frequently in medieval charters, confirming royal documents as well as in family transactions and donations. In March 976, he confirmed a donation made by his uncle count Fruela Vélaz to the Cathedral de Oviedo, as Gundimaro Pinioli armiger, that is, the standard-bearer of King Ramiro III of León. During a period of fifteen years he served in the curia regis of King Bermudo III of León and in March 996 appears for the first time with the title of count.

Count Gundemaro owned many properties in Oviedo, some purchased and others donated by kings Ramiro and Bermudo. For his baptism, Queen Velasquita Ramírez, possibly his godmother, gave him real estate properties He also owned land and villas in Teverga. With his wife Muniadona he made many donations to religious establishments, especially to the Monastery of San Vicente de Oviedo and to the city's cathedral. He and his wife Muniadona founded several monasteries, including San Miguel de Trevías in 1000 and also the Monastery of Santa Marina.

He last appears in medieval charters on 29 September 1011 and must have died between that date and 18 July of the following year when his widow Muniadona made a donation to the cathedral mentioning "uiro meo domnus Gundemaris, diue memorie" (Roughly: "in steadfast memory of my husband, Gundemar").

== Marriage and issue ==
The name of his first wife is not recorded. They were the parents of:

- Gontrodo Gundemáriz (died in February 1075). Gontrodo was a nun and probably the abbess of the Monastery of San Pelayo in Oviedo. On 22 December 1036, her stepmother Muniadona and her half-brother Fernando, gave her four monasteries, including San Salvador de Taule (or Tol) which years later gave rise to a legal dispute between the descendants of count Gundemaro and the Cathedral of Oviedo. (Note: In the donation to Gontrodo, Muniadona states: quod es Christi ancilla uel ex ex stirpe nostra necnon et propter seruicium quod nobis obtimum exibes et fidelissimus.) The donation made by Muniadona and her son Fernando was confirmed by several members of the royal house, including infanta Cristina Bermúdez, daughter of King Bermudo II of León and his first wife queen Velasquita Ramírez; Teresa Bermúdez, also daughter of Bermudo II and his second wife Elvira García, as well as Jimena, daughter of King Alfonso V of León. In her will, executed on 2 February 1075 in articulo mortis Gontrodo mentions her father, step-mother, and brother Fernando.

Gundemaro appears in 991 for the first time with his second wife Muniadona, whose parentage is unknown and who must have married at a very young age since she is still recorded as living in 1045. Two children were born of this marriage:

- Fernando Gundemáriz (died after 1063). In May 1063, Count Fernando made a donation to the Monastery of San Salvador de Taule of some villas which he had from his parents, Gundemaro and Muniadona, and also from his brother Pelayo who seems to have been dead by that date. He donated several villas, including Sierra de la Reina which he had received from Queen Velasquita Ramiréz when he was baptized. He married Muniadona Ordóñez, daughter of Ordoño Ramírez and great-granddaughter of count Gonzalo Menéndez He was apparently the grandfather of Jimena Díaz, the wife of Rodrigo Díaz de Vivar, El Cid. Jimena was daughter of Diego Fernández de Oviedo and his wife Cristina, whom recent reconstructions make daughter of Count Fernando, (Note: 13 August 1083, legal action involving the bishop of Oviedo and count Rodrigo Díaz and his siblings Fernando and Jimena regarding the ownership of the Monastery of San Salvador de Taule which had been donated by Gontrodo Gundemáriz to the Cathedral of Oviedo: ...quod erat ipsum monasterium de ecclesia Ouetensis sedis per kartulam testamenti quam fecit domna Gunterodo Gundemariz, filia Gundemari Pinioliz et per illam aliam kartulam donationis quam fecerut ipsi domne Gunterode nouerca sua comitissa dona Mumadona et filius eis Fredenandus Gundemariz sicut scriptum es in illa donatione, ut habuisset domna Gunterodo prefatum monasterium cunctis diebus uite sue absque ullo herede et post dicessum suum reliquisset illud Ouetensis ecclesie pro anima sua et fratis suiFredenandi Gundemariz et pro animabus comitis Gundemari Pinioliz et uxoris eius comitisse domne Mumadone quie prefatum monasterium fundauerunt in indiuise heredidate et post mortem supradicti comitis Gundemari remansit illud monasterium iamdictum ad suprafatum comitissam Mumadonnam et ad filium eius superius dictum Fredenandum...e contrario dicebant comes Rodericus Didaz et frater eius Fredenandus Didaz quod fuerat supramemoratum monasterium Taule ex eorum progenie et ipsi debenat illud habere post partem matris sue domne (en blanco) et amite sue done Urraca comitisse.) though others see Diego himself as Count Fernando's child.
- Pelayo Gundemáriz (died before 1063).

== Bibliography ==
- Calleja Puerta, Miguel (2001). El conde Suero Vermúdez, su parentela y su entorno social: La aristocracia asturleonesa en los siglos XI y XII (in Spanish). KRK Ediciones. ISBN 84-95401-68-1.
- Carriedo Tejedo, Manuel (2000). "Documentos relativos al "armiger regis" leonés durante la segunda mitad del siglo X (Documentos)". Cuadernos de historia de España (in Spanish) (76). Buenos Aires: Universidad de Buenos Aires: Instituto de Historia de España Claudio Sánchez Albornoz: 301–312. ISSN 0325-1195.
- Fernández Conde, Francisco Javier; Torrente Fernández, Isabel (2007). "Los orígenes del monasterio de San Pelayo (Oviedo): aristocracia, poder y monacato)". Territorio, Sociedad y Poder, Revista de Estudios Medievales (in Spanish) (2). Oviedo: Universidad de Oviedo: 181–202. ISSN 1886-1121.
- Fernández Suárez, Ana (1992). Teverga, un consejo de la montaña asturiana en la Edad Media (in Spanish). Oviedo: Real Instituto de Estudios Asturianos. ISBN 84-87212-16-6.
- García Álvarez, Manuel Rubén (1960). "¿La Reina Velasquita, nieta de Muniadomna Díaz?" (PDF). Work de Guimarães (70): 197–230. Archived from the original (PDF) on 2013-10-06.
- Salazar y Acha, Jaime de (1985). Una Familia de la Alta Edad Media: Los Velas y su Realidad Histórica (en Estudios Genealógicos y Heráldicos). Asociación Española de Estudios Genealógicos y Heráldicos. ISBN 84-398-3591-4.
- Torres Sevilla-Quiñones de León, Margarita Cecilia (2000–2002). "El Linaje del Cid" (PDF). Historia Medieval: Anales de la Universidad de Alicante, Departamento de Historia Medieval (in Spanish) (13). Alicante. ISSN 0212-2480. Archived from the original (PDF) on 2013-10-17.
- Torres Sevilla-Quiñones de León, Margarita Cecilia (1999). Linajes nobiliarios de León y Castilla: Siglos IX-XIII (in Spanish). Salamanca: Junta de Castilla y León, Consejería de Educación y Cultura. ISBN 84-7846-781-5.
