= Alfonso Núñez =

Galician nobleman

Alfonso Núñez (fl. 1101–1135) was a Galician nobleman and military leader.

He was the eldest son of Nuño Velázquez and Fronilde Sánchez, daughter of Count Sancho Ordóñez. From at least 28 January 1090 Nuño's power lay in the region of Limia. On 13 June 1104, he appears with his parents and siblings Menendo, Sancho, and Elvira in a donation to the monastery of Sahagún.

Between 1 April 1101 and 24 October 1102 Alfonso served as the alférez of Raymond of Galicia. He was one of the few Galician magnates loyal to Queen Urraca during her conflict with her son by Raymond, Alfonso Raimúndez, which may be surprising in light of Alfonso Núñez's known political connexions with Raymond. Between May 1112 and 1 June 1125 Alfonso held the tenencia of Limia, as had his father. His importance to Urraca in Galicia is exemplified by the Historia compostellana, which lists him first after Urraca's son when naming the leaders of the army which she assembled among "all the consuls and princes of Galicia" for making war on Alfonso I of Aragon and Navarre in the spring of 1118.

The only record of Alfonso's wife is from a document of 5 July 1118 in the archives of Celanova, which also happens to be the first record of Alfonso bearing the title comes (count), the highest title of nobility in the land. His wife's name appears to have been María. She gave him two daughters: Fronilde and Teresa. In 1126 or 1127 he made a grant to Braga Cathedral. He is last mentioned in a document of 18 May 1135.
