= Archaeological Museum of Asturias =

Museum in Spain

- Museo Arqueológico de Asturias
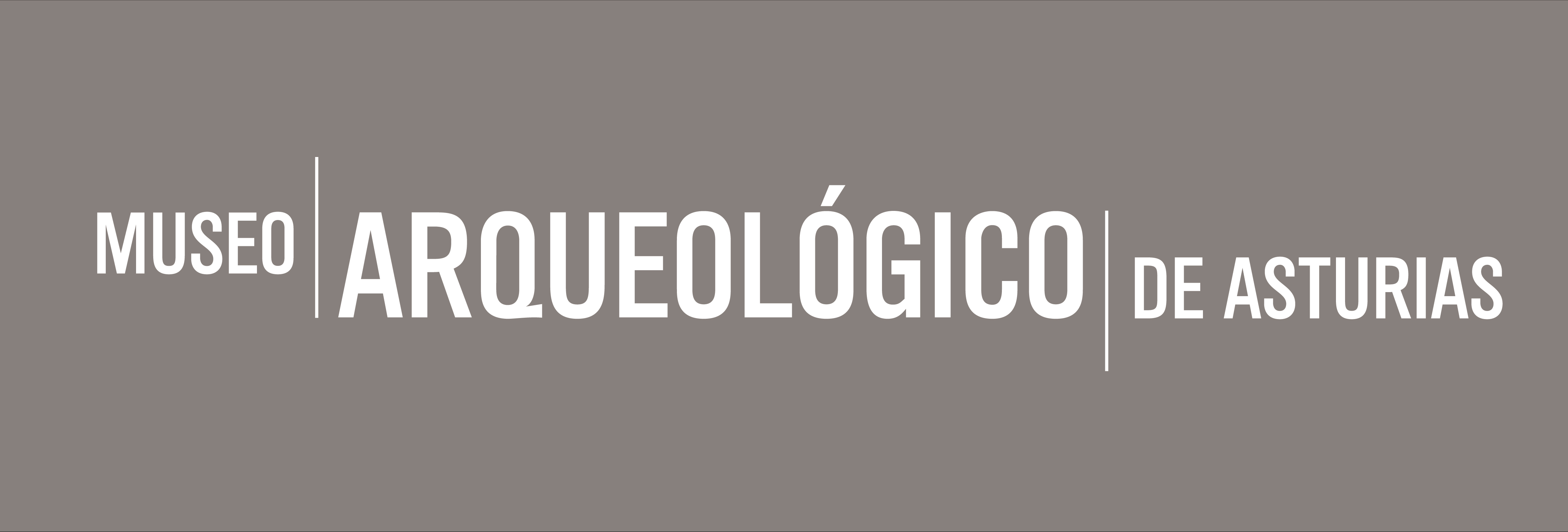

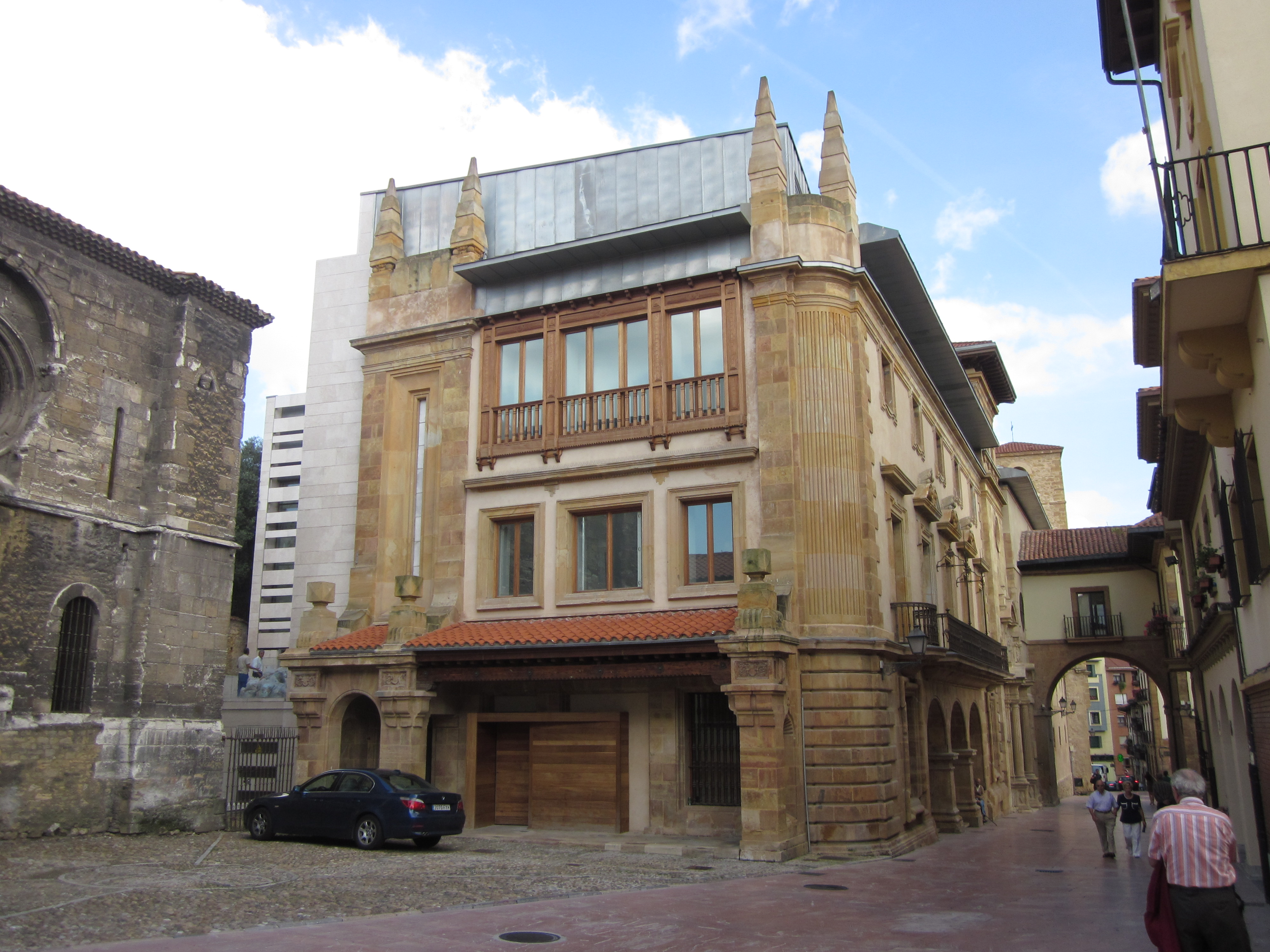
- Established: 1952
- Location: Calle San Vicente 3 and 5 Oviedo, Asturias, Spain
- Coordinates: 43.3625°N 5.8423°W
- Website: http://www.museoarqueologicodeasturias.com

The Archaeological Museum of Asturias (Spanish: Museo Arqueológico de Asturias; Asturian: Muséu Arqueolóxicu d'Asturies) is housed in the 16th century Benedictine monastery of Saint Vicente in Oviedo, Asturias, Spain. Its findings include collections of the Asturian Neolithic, Megalithic, Bronze Age, Iron Age, Astur hill fort culture, Roman period, and of the Gothic, Pre-Romanesque and Romanesque periods of the Kingdom of Asturias. The museum also includes sections of Asturian Ethnography, Heraldry, Medieval and Modern Epigraphy, Spanish Numismatics, a European Medal Section, and Armor.

While owned by the Spanish State, its management was transferred to the regional administration in 1991.

The museum underwent a series of refurbishment works beginning in 2004, being reinaugurated and reopened to the public on March 21, 2011.

== Notable pieces ==
- Vega del Cielo mosaic
- San Miguel de Lillo altar stone
- Santa María del Naranco altar stone
- 12th-century sarcophagus of Gontrodo Pérez, lover of King Alfonso VII of León and mother of Urraca la Asturiana., Queen of Navarre

== Permanent exhibits ==
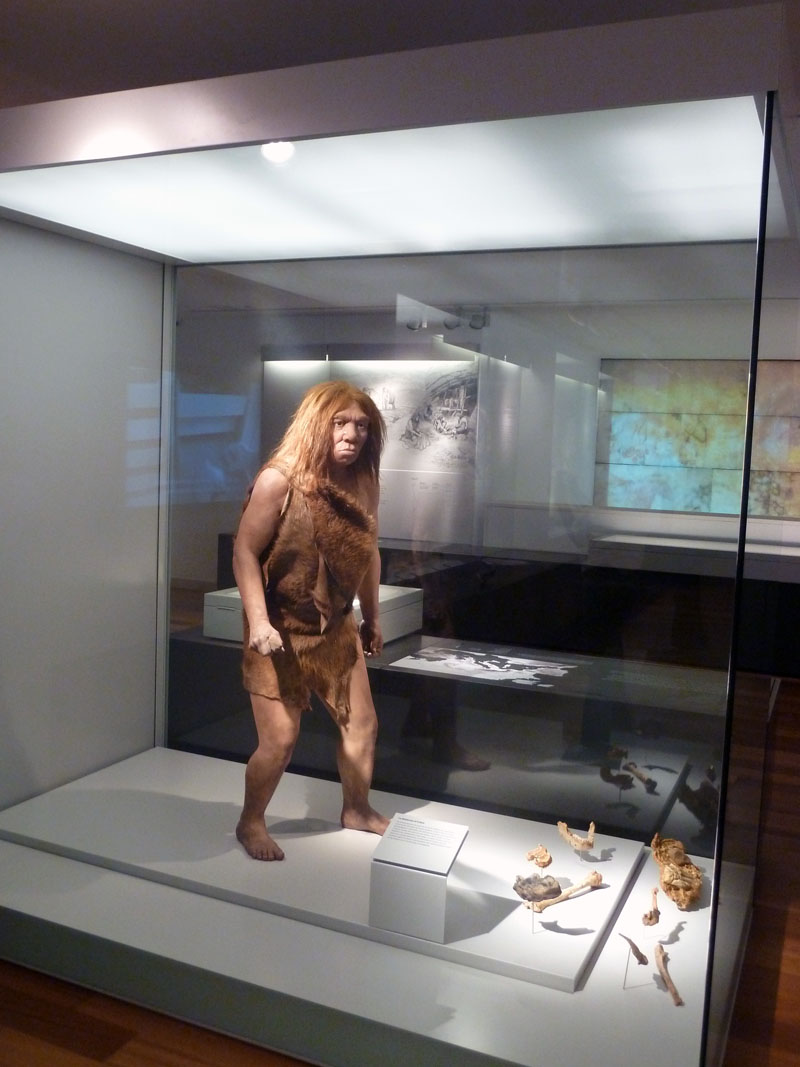
Hyperrealistic reproduction of a Neanderthal woman

The permanent exhibition narrates the history of the Asturian region from prehistory to the High and Late Middle Ages, through the material culture preserved in the museum, giving us a view of the different peoples that have inhabited this territory over its many centuries of history.

=== Prehistoric Times ===
Archaeological investigations have revealed the subsistence strategies (hunting, fishing and foraging) and technical advances in the manufacture of tools of the prehistoric people who occupied caves and shelters near rivers. Of particular note is the presentation of the world of the Neanderthals, provided by the latest discoveries in the Asturian cave of El Sidrón. The enigmatic universe of the different mindsets finds its most eloquent expression in Paleolithic parietal art and furniture. In Asturias, images of great beauty are to be found in nearly fifty caves, where our remotest ancestors carved or painted animals, symbols and summary representations of the human body.

=== Neolithic to Metal Ages ===
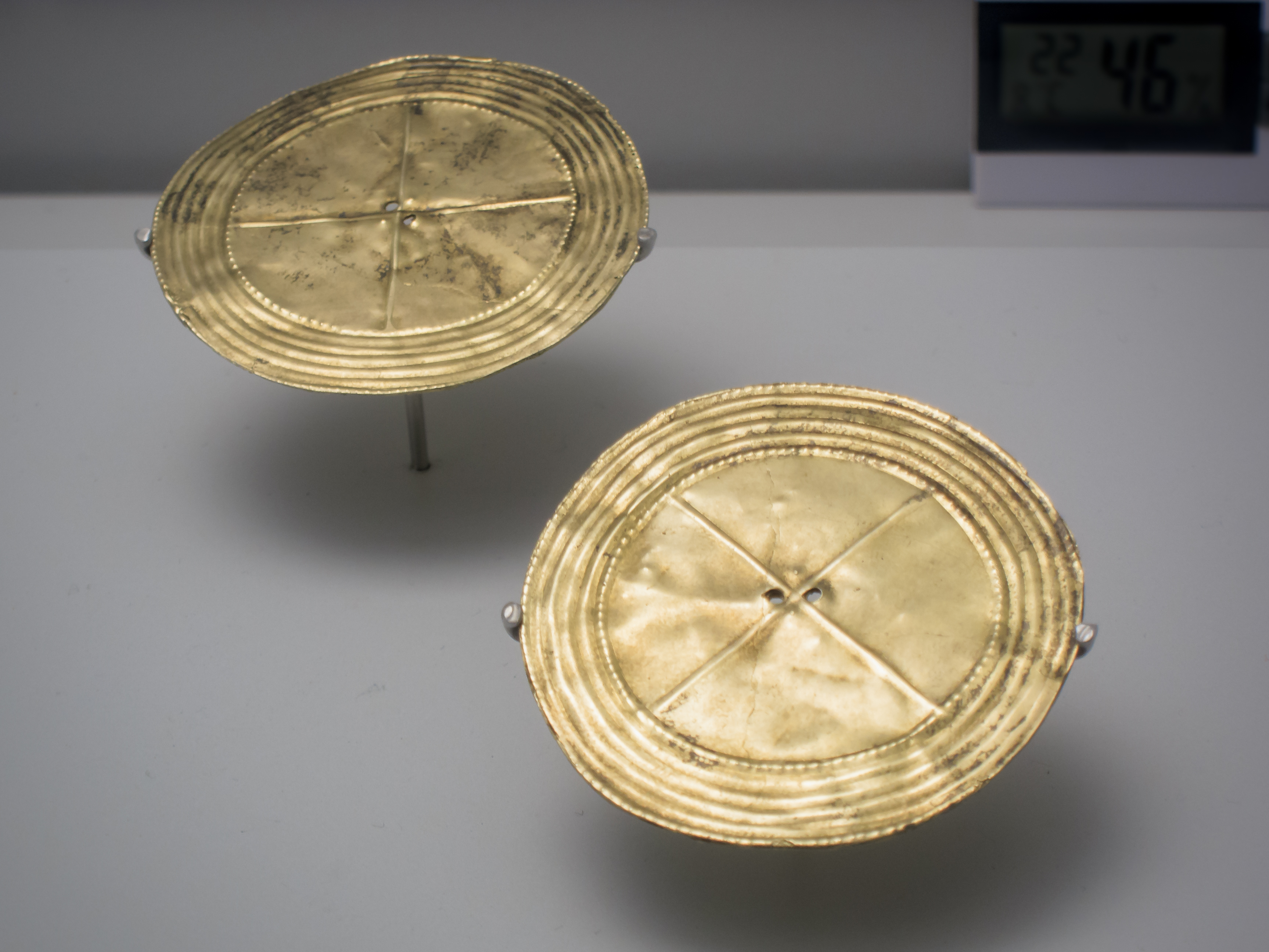
Gold discs, Bell Beaker culture

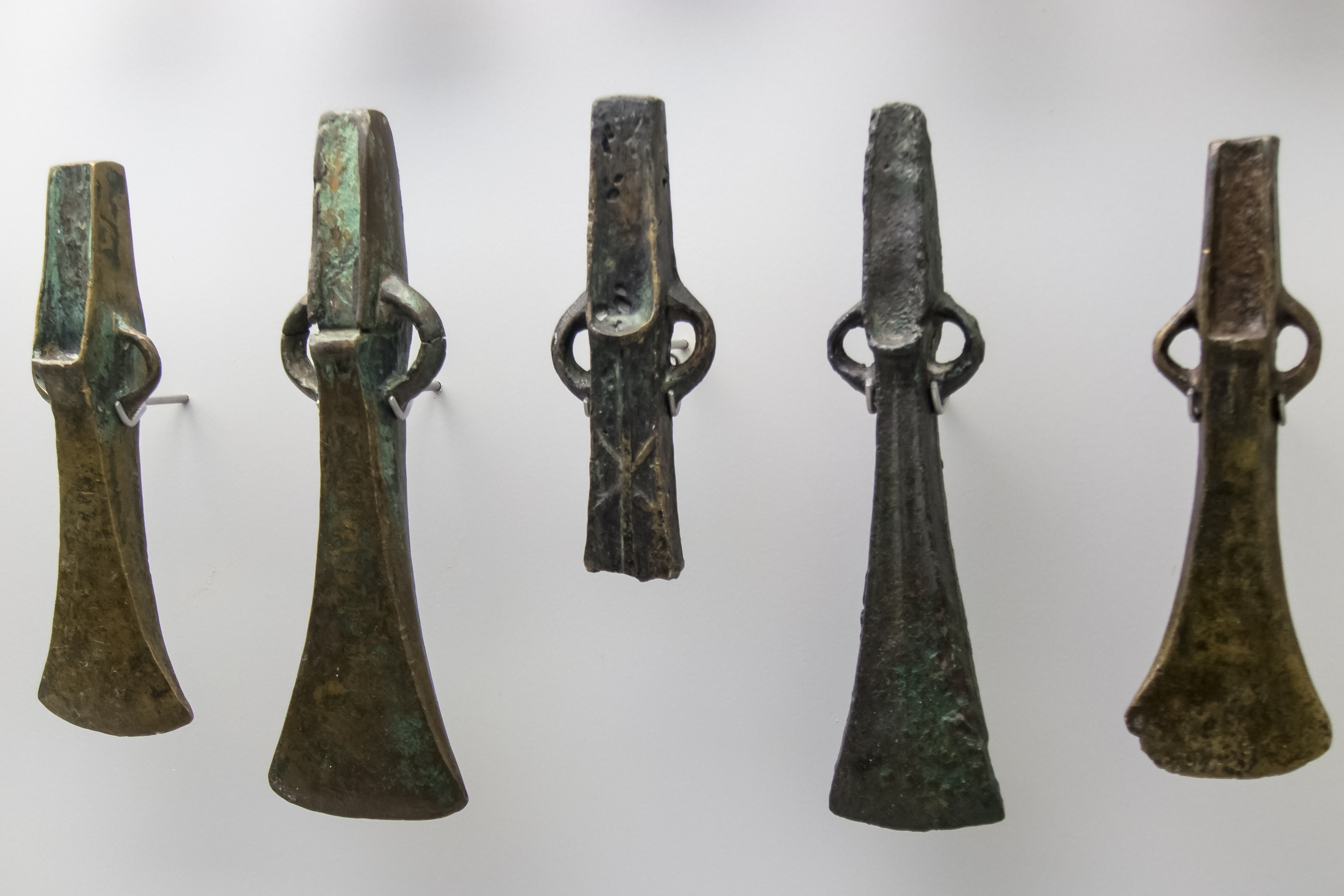
Bronze axes, Atlantic Bronze Age

From the Neolithic up through the Bronze Age, a drastic cultural change occurred as compared to the traditional way of life of Paleolithic societies. The people that populated our region about 4,500 years ago felled forests, cleared the first fields for crops and opened up areas of pasture land for raising animals. Megaliths, with their ritualistic and territorial significance, became a part of the Asturian landscape as a reflection of the complex new agricultural society. The intensive exploitation of copper mines and the expansion of the metallurgical phenomenon led to the development of increasingly complex societies. During this period, Asturias began its long history as a mining region.

=== Era of the Castros ===
The castros (fortified settlements) nowadays constitute one of the most visible elements of the Asturian landscape, the typical habitat in Asturias between the end of the Bronze Age and Roman settlement, i.e., during the Iron Age. The castros had an autonomous nature, with the defenses being the most outstanding boundary element, emblematic of these communities that appeared to be quite dissociated and divided into clans.

=== Rome in Asturias ===
With the arrival of Rome to the distant lands bordering the Bay of Biscay in the times of the emperor Augustus, Asturias became part of the Roman Empire. Under Roman rule, the territory became truly unified due to the creation of both urban and rural centers connected by an extensive network of roads. Profit from the gold mines focused Rome's attention on the western area of the region, exploiting deposits on a large scale. New economic and trade activities arose throughout the country, bringing about a change in the habits and customs of a traditionally mining and agricultural population. The presence of Rome in Asturias also marked our region's entrance into the cultural spheres of the classical world.

=== Medieval Asturias ===
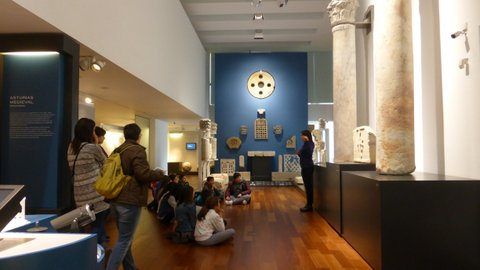
Visitors to the Medieval Hall

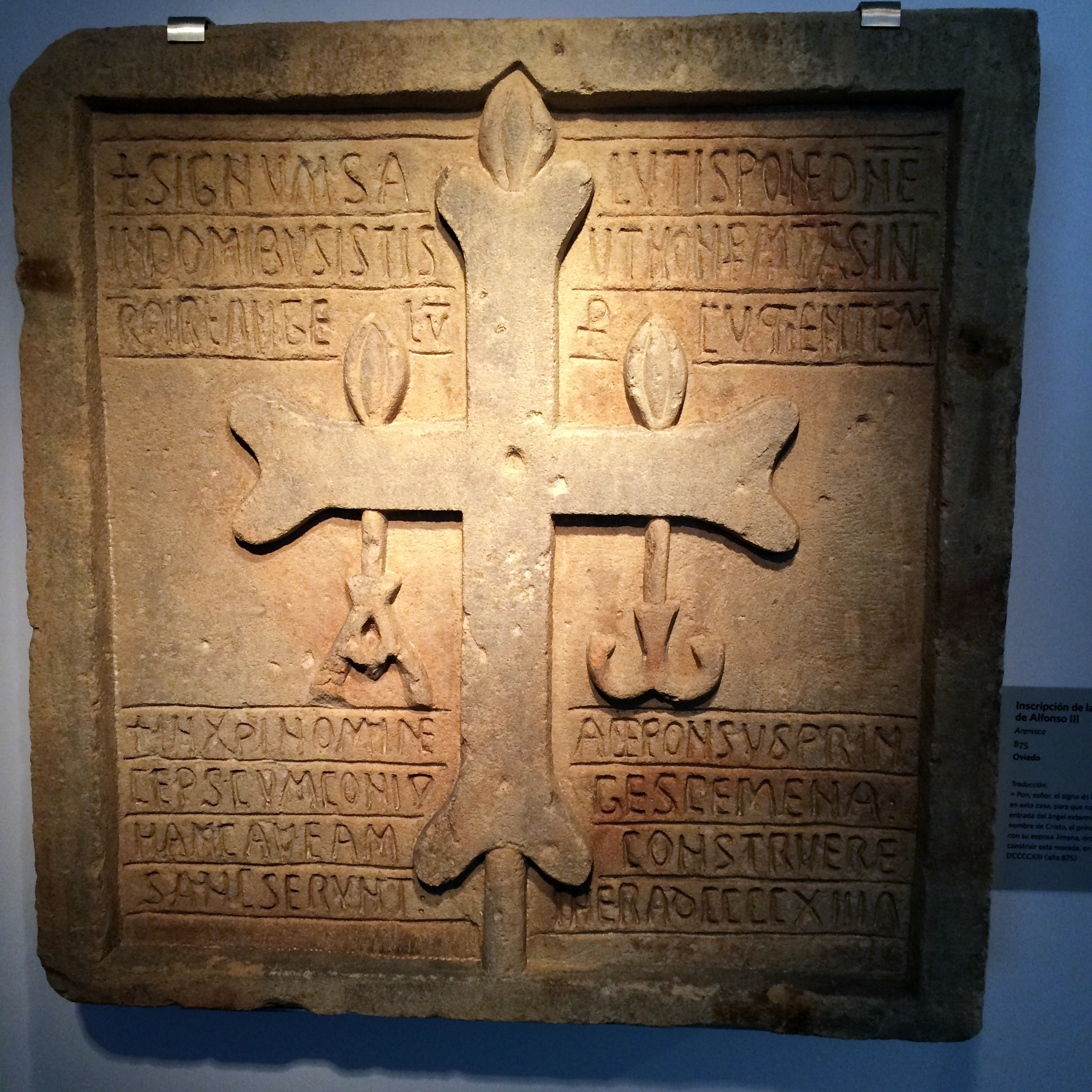
Inscription found inside the fortress of Alfonso III

The Kingdom of Asturias inaugurated the Middle Ages in this region. Royal sites, churches, monasteries and castles comprised the main centers of power of the monarchy and the early medieval aristocracy. However, most of the rural population lived in modest houses with simple household furnishings in small villages. The art of the Astur monarchy is noted for its architectural and ornamental originality. From the 13th century on, new urban centers and towns (Asturian polas) concentrated the population and centralized administrative, trade and craft activities. New Romanesque and Gothic churches were built in these cities, towns and villages. Towards the end of medieval times, there emerged a new aristocracy which played a major role in the political, economic and social life of the region.

Completing the exhibition a specific section entitled “From Collection to Museum”, which looks at how the museum came to be, its history running almost parallel to the beginnings of scientific archeology in the region.

In an annex to this thematic area is a tribute to the figure of Friar Benito Feijoo y Montenegro, extraordinary figure of the Spanish Enlightenment and abbot of the Monastery of San Vicente. A Benedictine cell has been reconstructed in the grandest part of the old cloister, just like the one found in the museum's former exhibition. In this way, we continue to recognize the most prolific essayist of the 18th century, whose intellectual work marked a milestone in the evolution of thought and science of that time.

Another section is devoted to the dissemination and appreciation of World Heritage sites in Asturias: Paleolithic cave art and monuments of the Asturian monarchy. Through a series of interactive screens and audiovisuals, visitors are given relevant information on these heritage sites as well as the various archaeological routes that can be taken to enjoy this cultural legacy.

== The collection ==
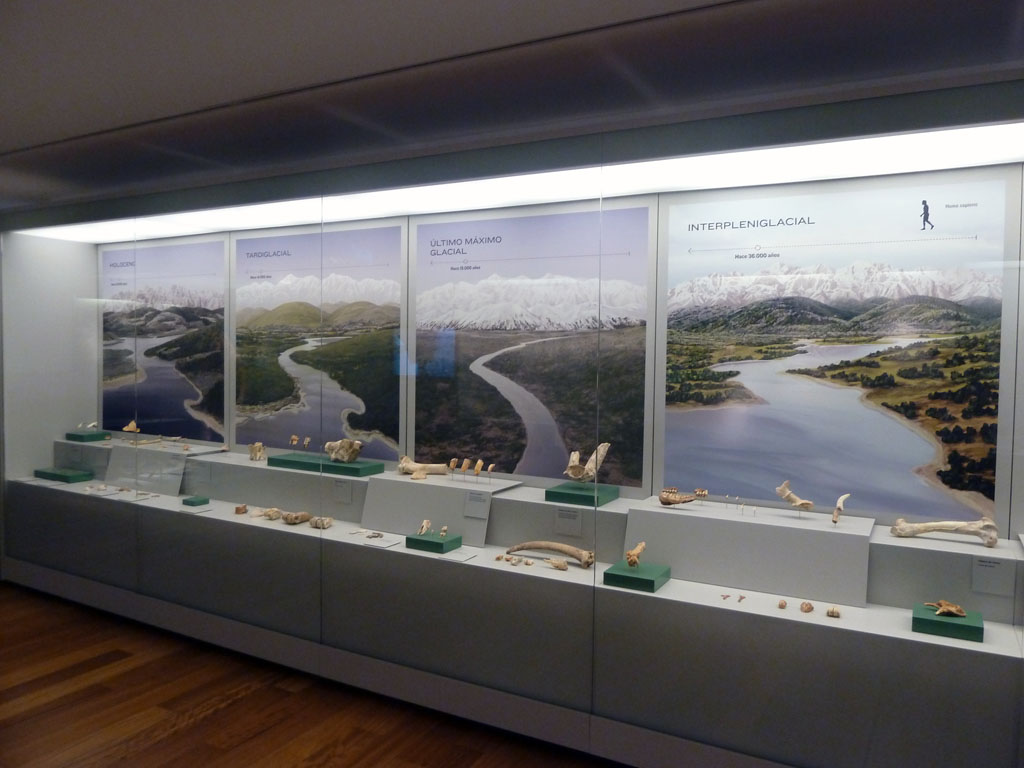
First floor. Environmental conditions in prehistoric Asturias

The confiscation of church property in 1837 put a great number of religious works of art into circulation and throughout the 19th century the Asturian Commission on Monuments took on the task of collecting the remains of those abandoned and sold-off monasteries and churches. These pieces constituted the source of the Museum of Antiquities’ collection, which gradually grew through the donations made by several of its members, as well as by collectors and scholars concerned with the past.

In its active work, the museum was mainly involved in the restoration of pre-Romanesque churches, collecting pieces from the ruins of some of these buildings. Once in the 20th century, the development of scientific archeology meant expanding the horizon towards prehistoric times, after Palaeolithic cave art was discovered in Asturias.

Throughout the 20th century, the museum's collection grew significantly as the result of archaeological excavations in Asturias. Private collections were also donated, adding to the holdings of the former Commission on Monuments. Throughout the 1960s and 1970s, the Provincial Government of Oviedo purchased a variety of wooden statues, furniture and other objects. Major purchases included three collections: that of the heirs of Soto Cortés, comprising all kinds of archaeological artifacts; the numismatic collection belonging to Pedro Hurlé Mansó; and the collection of arms and coins from the heirs of Tomás Fernández Bataller.

Research carried out since the 1970s has steadily expanded the museum's collection from the Paleolithic Age, the Metal Ages and the Roman period. The birth of archeology management, which has developed significantly since the 1990s, has led to a great deal of material from all ages being incorporated. This especially includes objects from the Middle Ages, collected from the historic centers of Asturian cities and towns, as well as from the numerous churches and monasteries which have been examined prior to their restoration.

== Library ==
The library of the Archaeological Museum of Asturias is the centre of documentation of the museum in Oviedo, Spain. It deals with the attention services for the study and investigation of the prehistoric times and archaeology in the Asturias. The library preserves a specialized fund in prehistorical times and archaeology in relation with the collections of the museum. It also has an automated catalogue of the funds and a reading room.

The Library has been from the beginning an important piece for the museum, which since the middle of the 19th century to the current days, has experienced a deep transformation, and an internal renewal that has its reflection in the management of its collections as in the management of the information.

=== Objectives ===
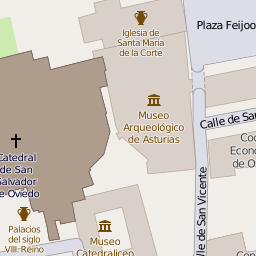

The basic objectives are:

- Upgrade the museum.
- Collect, sort, classify, catalog and register in a management system and spread all the information of interest for the study, analysis and investigation of the possessions deposited in the museum.
- Conserve and preserve its documentary collections.
- Integrate in the documentation area its archives and library which are the main axis of the information sources of the museum.
- Spread the funds for its enhancement, through publications and especially through websites.
- Establish relations of cooperation and collaboration with other institutions.
- Update, by using technologies, the services that it offers to the users through its website.

=== Physical space ===
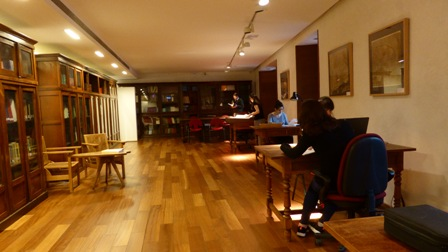
A view of the museum's library.

The library is located between the first and second floor of the museum. The access is made through the ancient stairs of the monastery. The space is distributed in two great areas: one of them dedicated to query, and the other one to the deposit. The query area has seven seats for reading, in which users can consult the funds of the bibliographic collection and the archive. The Internet access is available, and it also has a computer in case of need of reprographic printing. This space also completes with a working zone for the library staff.

The library is free to access and it offers the service of query from Monday to Friday, so the problem of the restricted access to the public, kept since a lot of years, is resolved. The library is also a polyvalent place, where it can be celebrated meetings and didactic workshops.

=== Collection ===
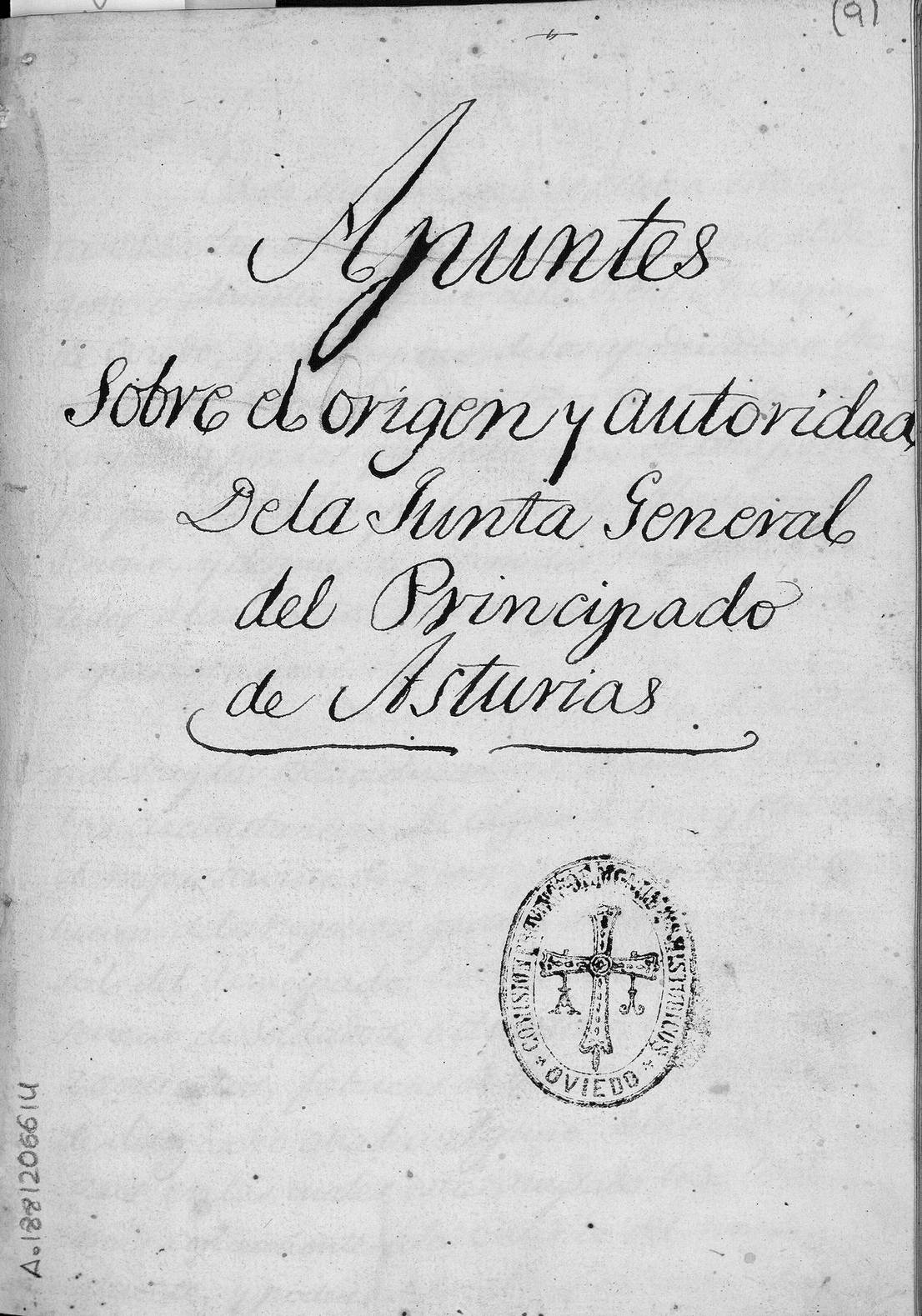
Copy from the library

The library is specialized in archaeology, prehistory, ancient history and medieval history, with a special reference to Asturias. Its catalogue is integrated in the Collective Catalogue of the Network of Libraries of Asturias and its query can be done through the Collective Catalogue of the Libraries of Asturias. The bibliographic collection possesses a great chronological amplitude, that goes from 1650 to actuality. The documentary typology is varied and although the weight is made by monographs and magazines, it also has cartographic material, images, audiovisual supports, drawings, plates, pictures, posters and manuscripts. The main linguistic coverage is the Spanish but it also has English, French and Italian publications. It is formed by 15.000 volumes. The bibliographic collection is grouped in several sections individualized by its thematic, typology or origin.

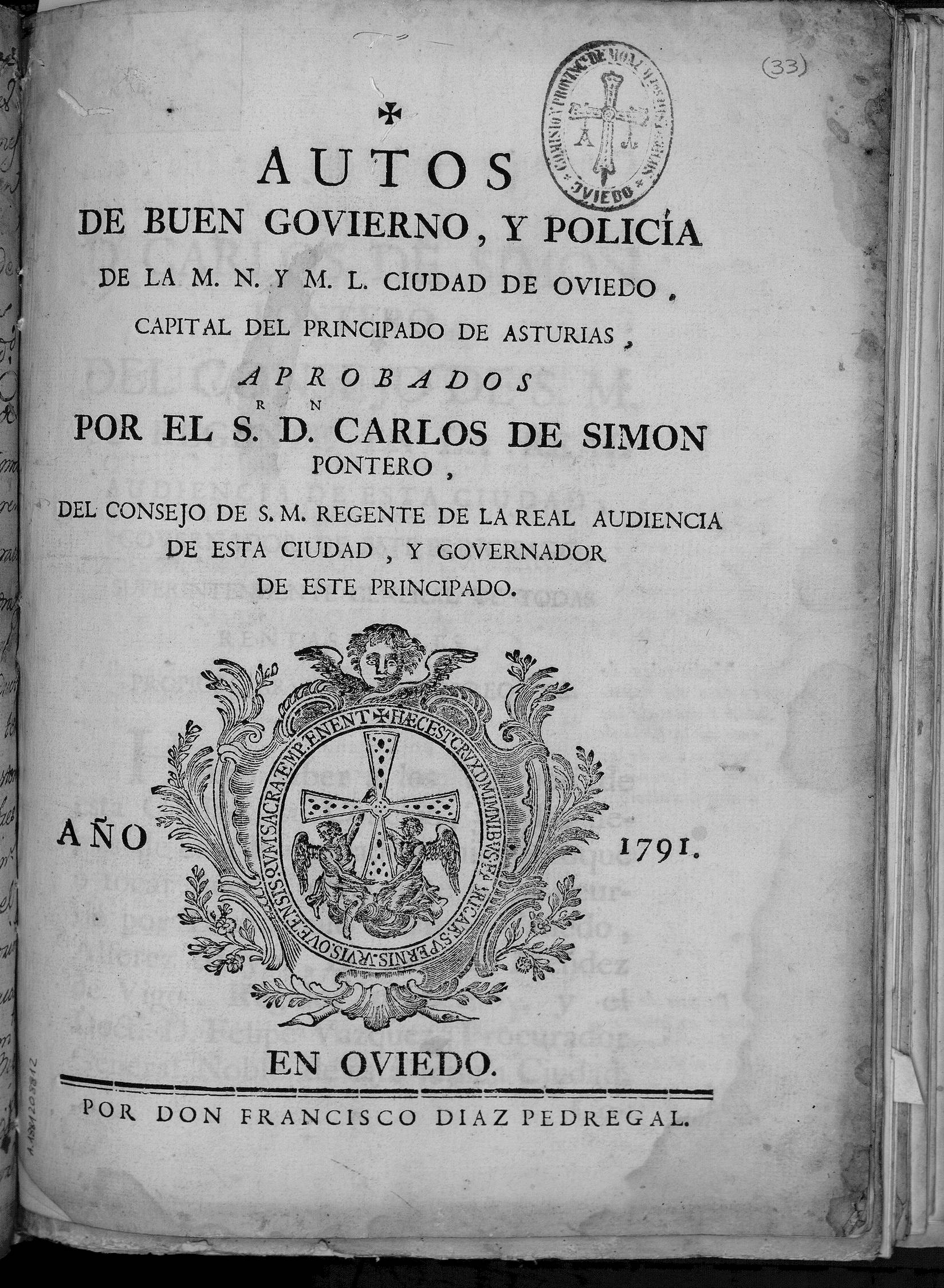
- Copy from the library
  HISTORICAL FUND or LIBRARY of the CPMHA. It constitutes an own section, and it is known as the Library of the Commission. It is formed by near 3.500 registers, gathered from 1844 to 1952 which answer to the interests of the institution, in a determinate period and by those who were at the top of the shopping and acquisitions (Ciriaco Miguel Vigil, Fermín Canella, Fortunato de Selgas, Rafael Altamira, etc.). It predominates the following matters: epigraphy, numismatist, antiquities, classical archaeology, history of art, medals, ivories, fine arts, Asturian subjects, etc. The majority were printed between 1870 and 1930 and the origin is diverse. it entered by purchase, by donation of its author or possessor and by exchange between history institutions, local studies or of provincial museums. There are French editions of art encyclopedias, of classical art, antiquities, editions on the first archaeologic excavations in the 19th century, and the main works of the 19th century in matter of prehistory and archaeology. It conserves an extraordinary work: Architectural Monuments of Spain, considered the most ambitious project from the bibliographic point of view of ones tackled in Spain. This work was printed to study and spread the artistical heritage of the country, specially the Asturian. It was published under the direction of a special commission created by the Ministerio de Fomento, between 1856 and 1881. In its graphic part it was employed with big precision the technics of the intaglio, the lithography and the cromolitografía. Also it stands out factitious editions that gather documents and varied brochures, grouped by subjects of interest: Subjects of Asturias, political Writings, History, etc. There are documents of interest written in Asturian language, that allowed the study of this language: loose leaves, poems and manuscripts. And also handwritten texts, speeches, sermons, letters, and historical documentation. Other curious materials that integrate the collection of the library are ephemeral and difficult to achieve materials like brochures, small format publications, posters, loose leaves, etc.
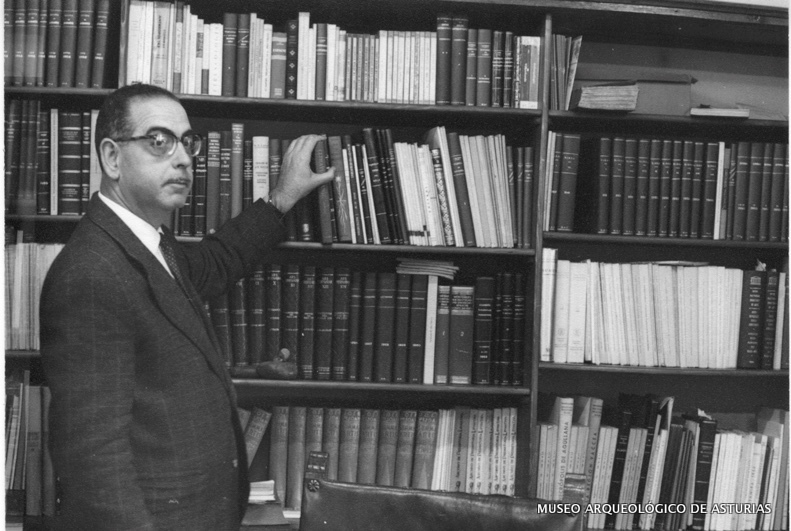
- Francisco Jordá Cerdá, director of the museum.
  GENERAL FUND. The general fund of the library is formed by monographs and reference works. There are about 9.000 volumes that covers all the areas of knowledge, although history and art are the most represented, specially referred to Asturias. The typologies are varied: manuals, memories of archaeological excavations, catalogues of exhibitions, museums, records of congresses, thesis, tesinas, homages, etc. The Archaeologic Museum of Asturias has the function, conferred by the Law 1/2001 of Cultural Heritage, of protect all the rests and archaeological objects that are exhumed in the excavations that makes the Princedom of Asturias. It also has the obligation to carry out the promotion of the investigation and Asturian archaeology. In relation with this function, in the collection abound the Excavations Memories and the monographic studies of archeological sites that attract many requests of query from users. Since the 1980s, the increase of the management archaeology and the projects and archaeologic plans, as well as the interventions of conservation and monument restoration in all the country, propitiated a big development of publications that collects the plans and memories. Cultural Heritage services of each region develop and issue publications and newsletters with this detailed information for its diffusion, as the result of a lot of archeological sites needs years of excavation campaigns.
- PERIODIC PUBLICATIONS. It has an important collection formed by of 152 titles in permanent growth. A great part of the fund enters through the agreements of exchange, with more than 70 Spanish and foreign institutions. Some are previous to 1900, like the Bulletin of the Academy of the History, the Bulletin of the Spanish Society of Excursions : Art, Archaeology, History or the Bulletin of the Royal Academy of Saint Fernando, The Galician and Asturian illustration, the Magazine of Archives, Libraries and Museums, etc. During the first 30 years of the 20th century, the most frequent titles are, between others, Revue of synthèse historique, Upper Board of Excavations and Antiquities, Museum : monthly magazine of ancient and modern Spanish art and of the contemporary artistic life. Since 1944 there is a strong worry to keep alive the collections and acquire new titles, which enters by purchase. Magazines of institutions that have established exchange agreements, enters by donation, ensuring its continuity: Artistic Historical bulletin of Lugo, Hispanic Archaeologic Record, Annals of the Museum of the Spanish Village, Spanish Archive of Archaeology, Hispanic Archaeologic Newscast etc. However, in the last years, the economic crisis affected a lot the budget items for the editions in paper, so since the last three or four years, it is frequent the query of digital magazines through the website of the institutions.
- OTHER MATERIALS. In the library is also deposited the Archive of CPMHA with documentation from 1840, that occupies 30 files. It also has ancient photographs, drawings, diplomas, pictures, plates, local newspapers, etc. The modern images' archive of the museum, houses an approximate collection of 5.000 photographies of pieces and archaeological materials.

=== Users ===
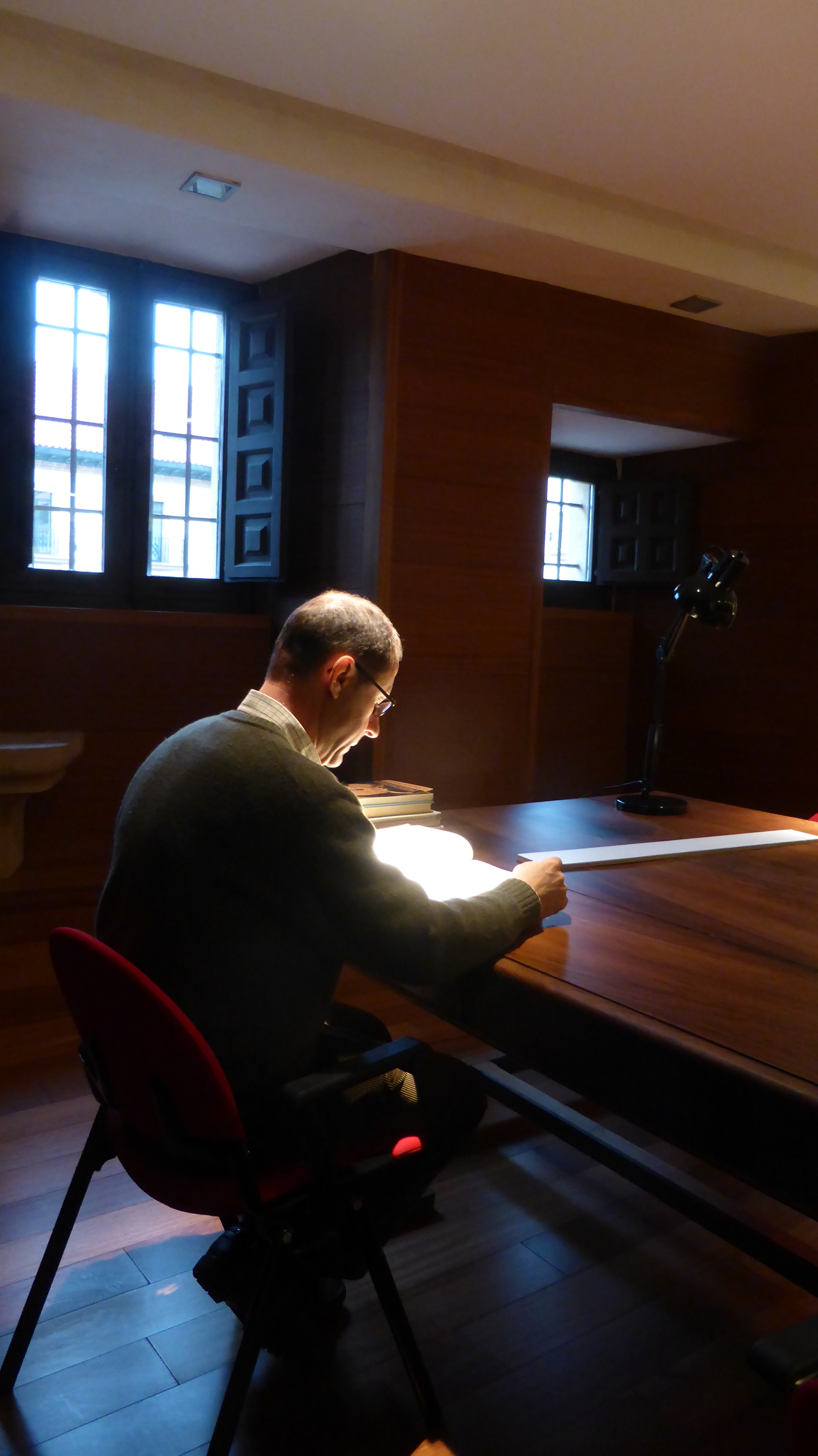
People consulting bibliography in the Archeological Museum Library

The library of the Archaeologic Museum of Asturias is dedicated to these users:

- Personal of the own museum.
- Students of History of Art, History, and museology.
- Cultural informers and tourist guides.
- University professors.
- Archaeologists and historians that collaborate with the museum in various activities.
- Researchers.
- Users interested in the local history.
- Other institutions that demands the information for any of its users.
- External technicians that organizes exhibitions about a determinate time and territory.

== Services ==
The library of the Archaeologic Museum is today different from what it was some years ago, and no precisely for its bibliographic fund, but for the service provided. it has become a space for the researchers community. In the same way that museums are no longer institutions that accumulate and classify objects, libraries are not book warehouses for the exclusive use of the conservatives.

== History ==
=== History of the museum ===
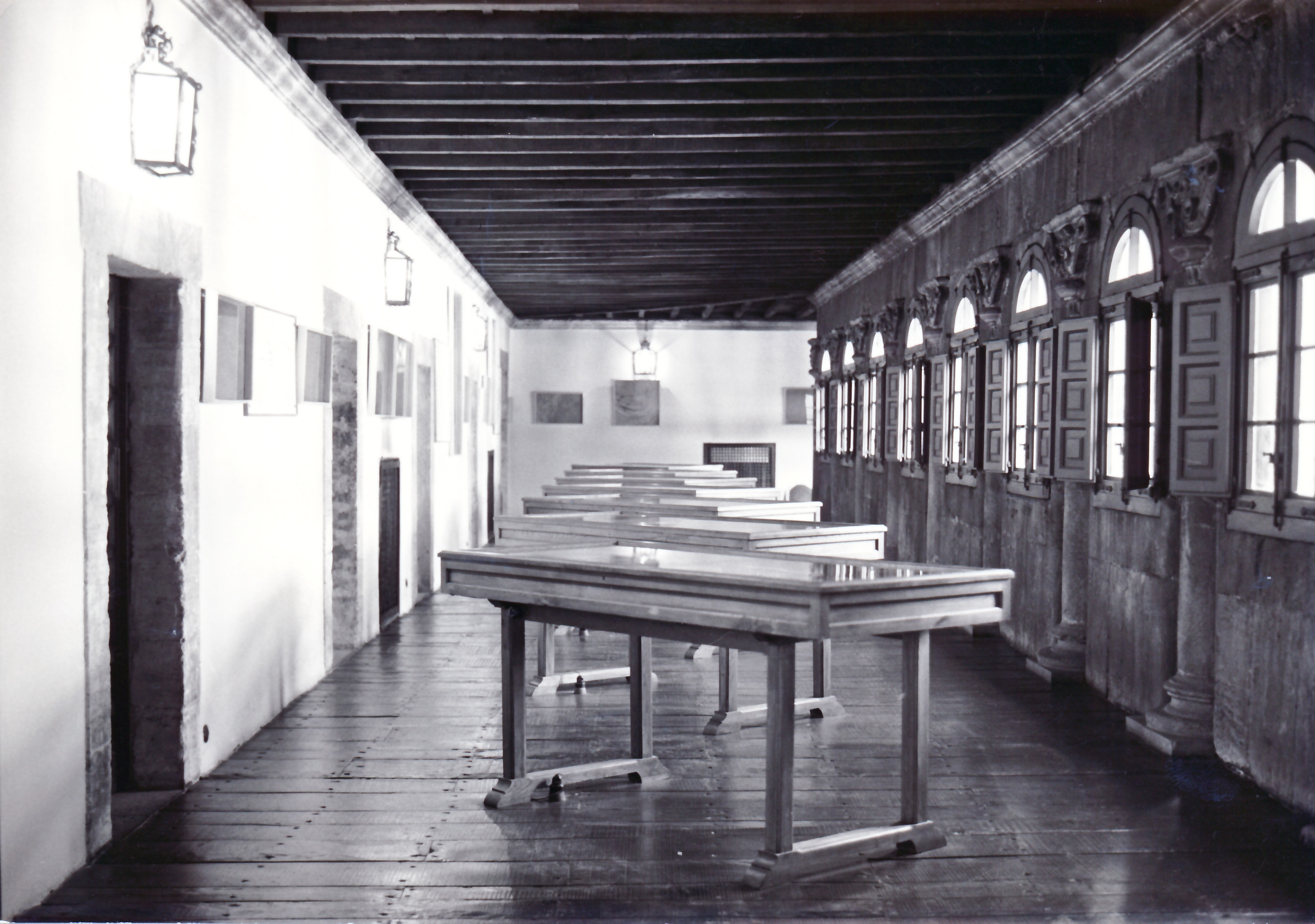
Upper cloister of the Monastery of San Vicente, current home to the Archaeological Museum of Asturias, before the 2004 refurbishments.

The precedent for the current museum lies in the Provincial Commission on Monuments, created in 1845, which carried out the first actions to protect the monuments and cultural heritage of Asturias, opening the first museum in 1870 in the Convent of San Francisco, which has since ceased to exist, with pieces collected throughout the Asturian region as well as from private donations.

The current museum dates from 1944, although it was not opened to the public until 1952 in the cloister of the former Monastery of San Vicente. The collection has since grown due to excavations, donations and purchases of pieces. Given the condition of the building, in 1998 the Ministry of Culture started the process of refurbishing and expanding the museum. Works to carry out the project designed by architects Fernando Pardo Calvo and Bernardo García Tapia were begun in 2004. After an investment of 16 million euros, the remodeling has increased the museum's gross floor area to 5,810 m², of which 2,013 m² are dedicated to its permanent exhibition.

At the same time, these works led to the discovery of a 1.6 m-high bastion from the original 8th-century wall that surrounded Oviedo. The arcades of the cloister rest on the remains of this city wall. The initial project for the works had to be modified to leave these parts of the wall exposed as yet another of the museum's treasures. The find supports historian Juan Uría Ríu's hypothesis regarding the course of this wall, erected in the times of Alfonso II.

=== History of the library ===
The library of the Archaeological Museum of Asturias was born with the Provincial Commission of Monuments, an organism created by the real Order of July 24, 1844. After the desamortización of the ecclesiastical possessions in 1836, it was necessary to organize a public system in order to protect the buildings and artistic objects that had become property of the State. It had the objective of the conserving cultural heritage, gathering data of the buildings, monuments and antiquities worthy of conservation, and also caring for books, documents, pictures, statues, medals, etc.

To know the life of the library, we have to follow the life of the museum marked by successive headquarters and events.

==== The Library in times of the COMMISSION MUSEUM (1844–1878) ====
The first collection was gathered 150 years ago and it started as an auxiliary library. It has been taken care by the University of Oviedo librarian Manuel de Prado y Tovía, encharged in 1854, and later by Aquilino Suárez Bárcena. In 1868, it was allocated, as the first building to house the collection of the museum and the library, the Chapel of the Third Order of the Convent of San Francisco of Oviedo whose reform and installation was prolonged for seven years.

==== The Library in times of the ANTIQUITIES MUSEUM (1878–1918) ====
On September 21, 1878, Day of Saint Mateo, the museum was opened with a simple installation, a total space of 124 m2. The Library was an attention focus in the museum, as it said Fermin Canella Secades in 1882: "it has enriched enough in these last years, with books of history, archaeology, fine arts, etc., and between these, we found the remarkable publication of architectural Monuments of Spain and a special section of works, brochures and historical asturian papers".

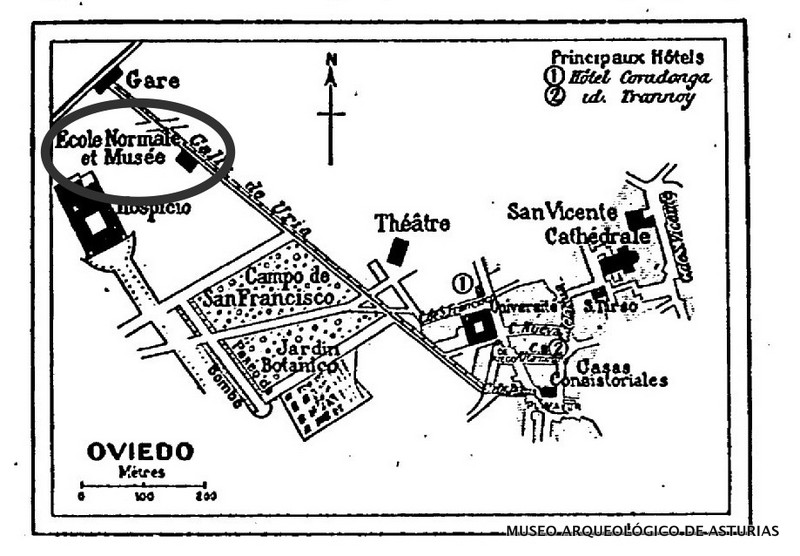
Plane of Oviedo with the situation of Normal Schools and Museum in 1908

Of this headquarters it moved in 1889 to the Normal Schools, with a space of 215 m^{2} (2,310 sq ft), formed by a playground and two rooms, one of them destined to archive and library and the other, to a living room of sessions. In 1902 the library opened to the public and to the loan, it turns into a circulating library. But the Normal Schools needed more space, so the library moved again.

==== The Library in times of the PROVINCIAL MUSEUM (1918–1951) ====
The building assigned in 1918 was provisional, and it was the low floor of the Dean's house, Benigno Rodríguez Pajares, in the plazuela de la Corrada del Obispo. From this moment the library, the archive and the collection of pieces of the museum remained there with restricted access; this situation propitiated the fact that the building did not suffer extreme damage by the violent attacks of the Revolution of October, in 1934 and the Civil War. In 1939, the Deputation took care of the reconstruction and restoration of the building of the Benedictine Monastery of Saint Vicente, the final site for the museum, with a work commissioned by the architect Luis Menéndez-Pidal.

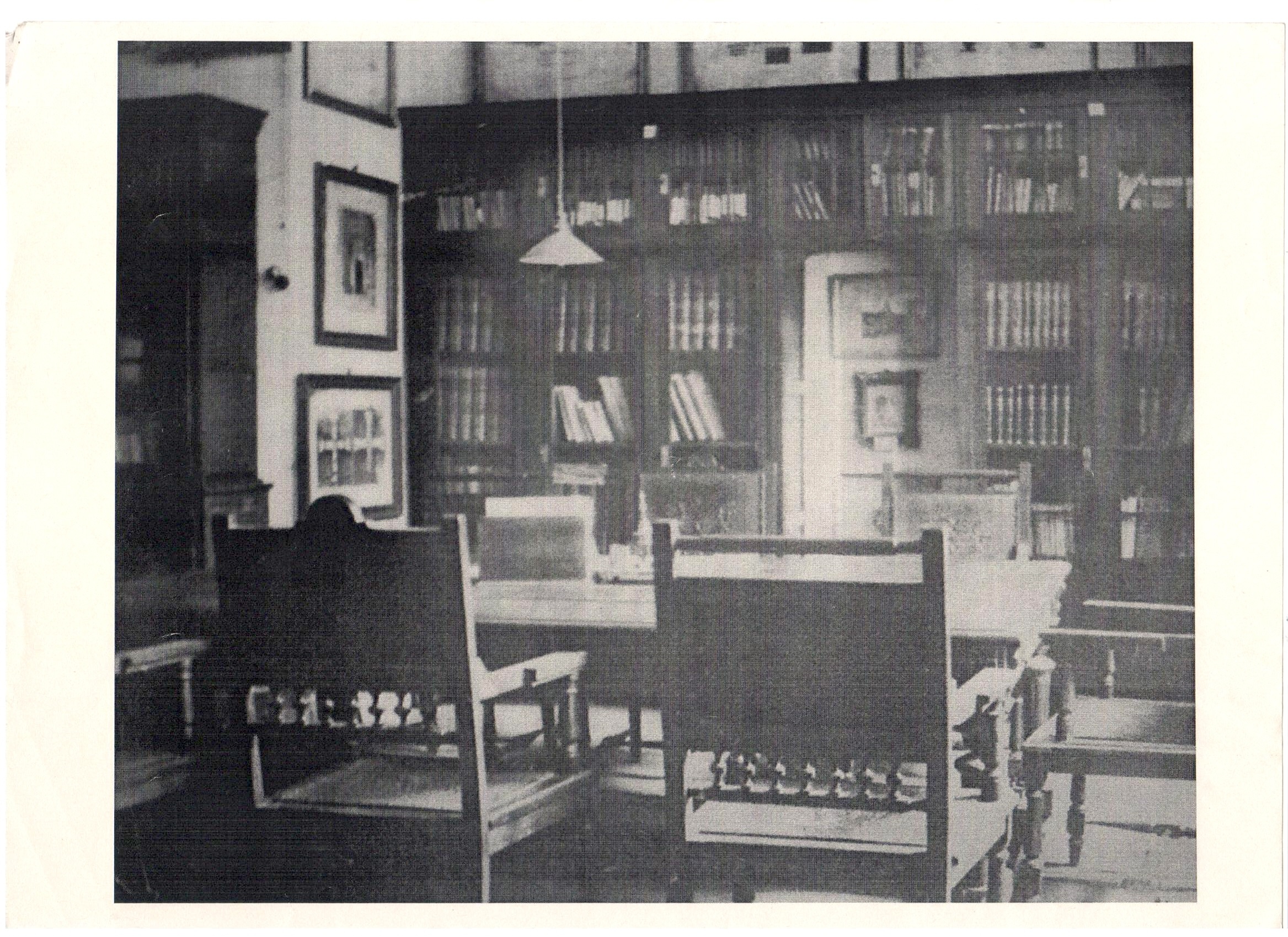

==== The Library in times of the PROVINCIAL ARCHAEOLOGIC MUSEUM (1952–2003) ====
On San Mateo's day, in 1952 it was inaugurated the museum. In this new place, the library occupied an important place as the institution required. The control of the library is the director's function, as well as the management of the museum's collection. As well as the acquired funds, the library initiated a new stage with the deposit of bibliographic funds. With this new stage, it established relationships with national and foreign entities for the exchange of bulletins and qualified publications. In 1972 disappeared the commission and its functions were integrated by the Deputation. The competences of the Provincial Museum, were transferred in 1991 to the Government of the Asturias Princedom.

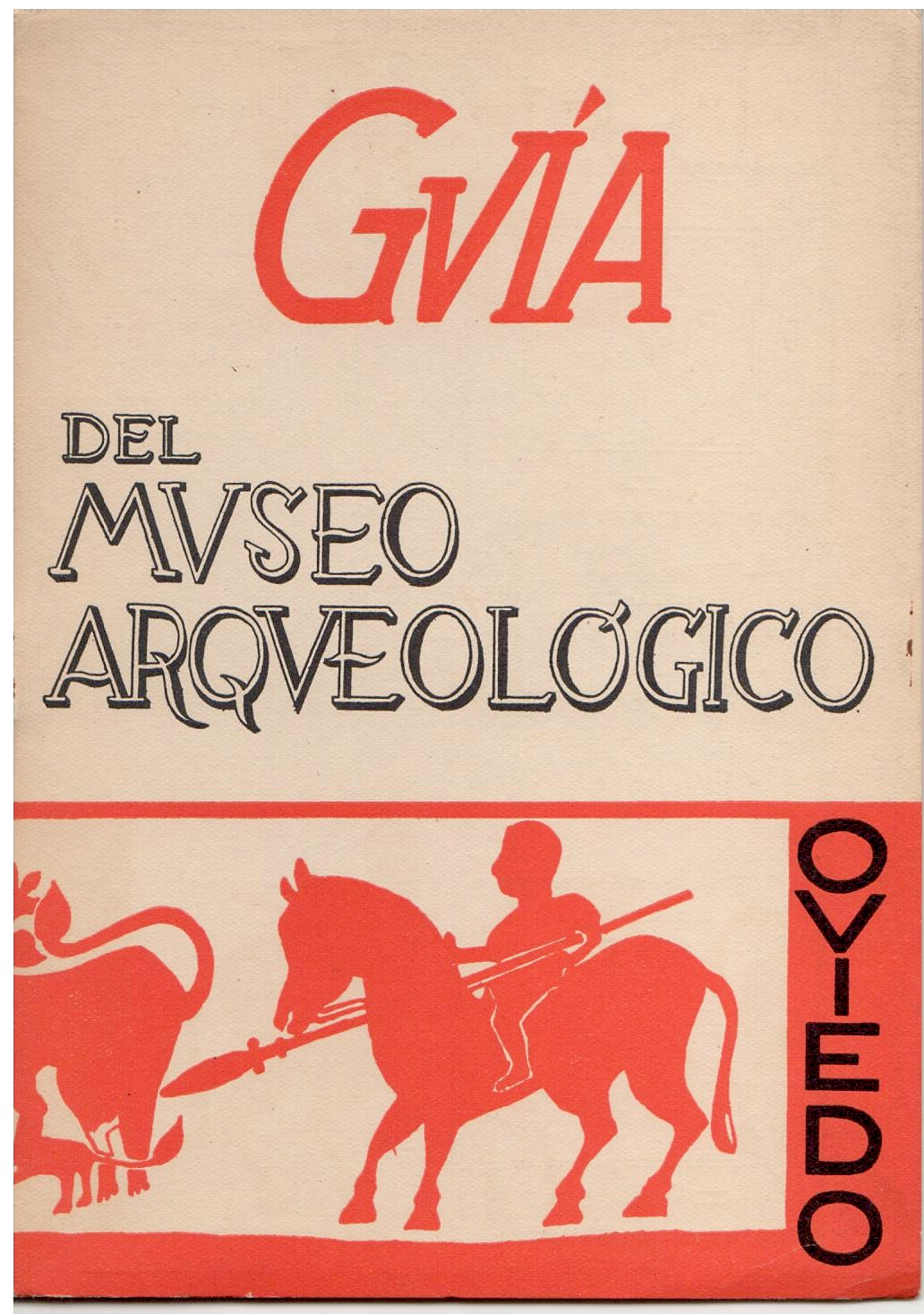

==== The Library in time of the ARCHAEOLOGIC MUSEUM OF ASTURIAS. (2011–) ====
After 8 years of closing and of internal work, on March 21, 2011, the Archaeologic Museum of Asturias reopened to the public in its historical headquarters, rehabilitated and expanded with a building of new plant. The museum, besides, endows of a modern permanent exhibition and of a group of public equipment and interns that will allow the suitable operation of the institution. With the renewal of the museum could say that the library incorporates to the modernity. The library opened to the public, its catalogues were accessible in the network and its historical bottoms have begun to digitalize.

== The building ==
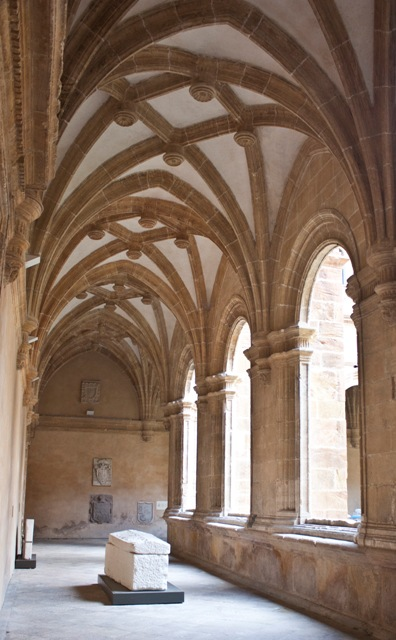
Lower cloister of the ancient Monastery of Saint Vicente, current headquarters of the Archaeologic Museum of Asturias.

Since 1952, the museum has occupied the cloister of the former Monastery of San Vicente, a building with a complex history related to the origin of the city. The cloister was declared a national monument in 1934

The Monastery of San Vicente is believed to have been founded in 761, during the reign of Fruela I. Only remnants of that first building have survived. However, the cloister, begun in the 1530s under the direction of master builder Juan de Badajoz, the Younger and completed by Juan de Cerecedo, the Elder and Juan de Cerecedo, the Younger in the 1570s, remains standing.

== See also ==
- Archeological Museum of Asturias' Library
- List of museums in Spain
