= San Juan Bautista de Corias =

Coordinates: 43°11′41″N 6°32′37″W

Abbey of San Juan Bautista de Corias
- Monasterio de San Juan Bautista de Corias
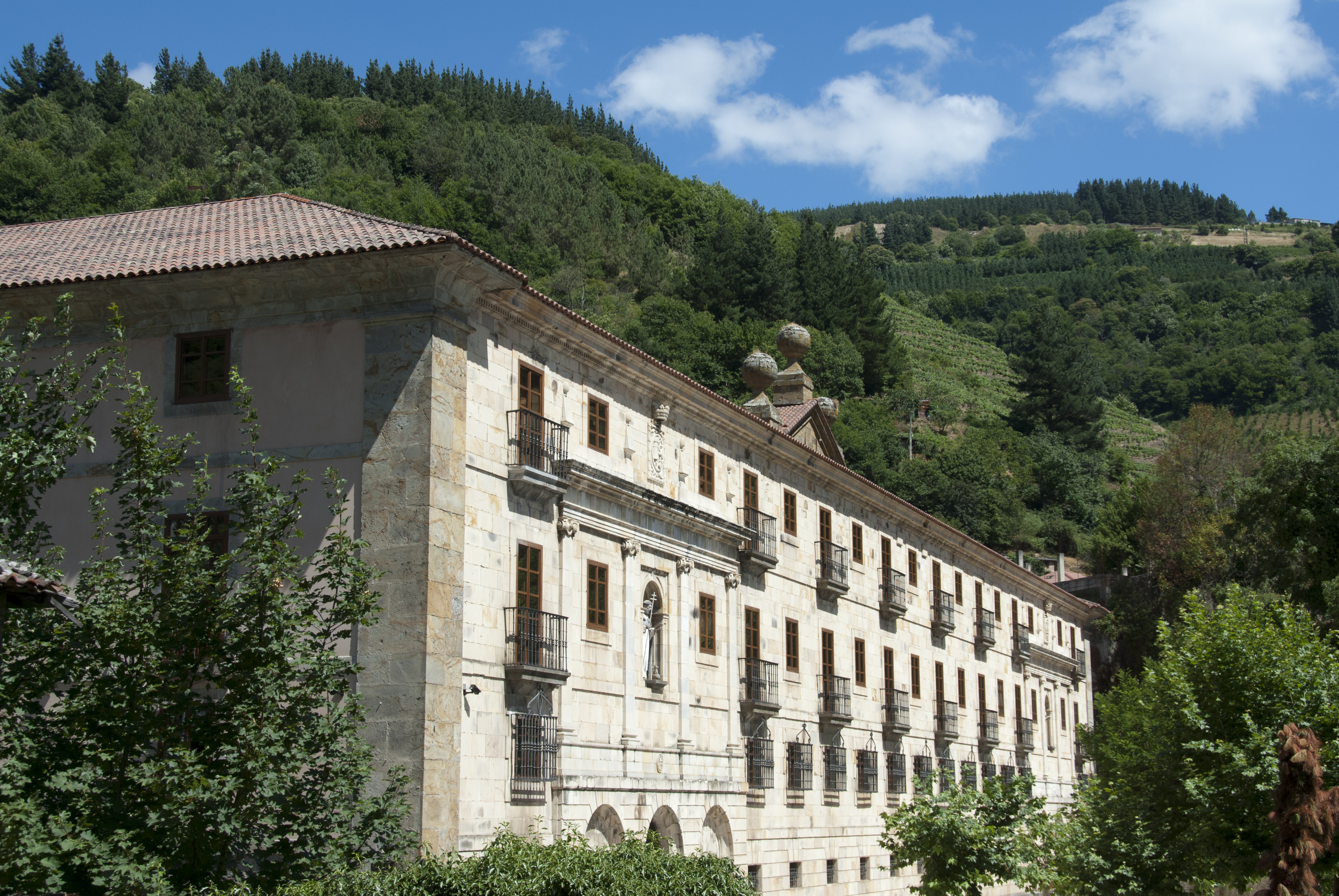
- Alternative names: Parador de Corias
- Hotel chain: Paradores

General information
- Location: Cangas del Narcea (Asturias), Spain

Website
- Parador de Corias

Spanish Cultural Heritage
- Type: Non-movable
- Criteria: Monument
- Designated: 24 July 1982
- Reference no.: RI-51-0004672

The Abbey of San Juan Bautista de Corias (Asturian: San Xuan Bautista de Courias) is a former Benedictine monastery in Corias in Cangas del Narcea (Asturias), Spain, on the right bank of the Narcea River, dedicated to Saint John the Baptist. Today it is a historic site of the province, informally known as "the Asturian Escorial" (el Escorial Asturiano), due to the burial there of King Bermudo I of Asturias (died 797) and his family.

== History ==
The abbey was founded in 1022 through a donation of land by Count Piñolo Jiménez (Piniolo) and his wife Aldonza Muñoz, wealthy Leonese aristocrats. The construction of the planned monastery, built in the Romanesque style, was completed in 1043 and a monastic community was established there the following year.

The first abbot was Arias Cromaz, a relative of Piniolo and thus also of Oveco, who was Bishop of Oviedo from 913 to about 960. After 19 years as abbot, Arias was named Bishop of Oviedo by King Alfonso VI of León and Castile. Land disputes arose with the various powers of the region during its early days, and, about the turn of the 12th century, a number of agreements are recorded between Count Fernando Díaz, one of the most powerful lords of the region, and Munio, the Abbot of Corias, wherein a number of towns were swapped.

The abbey reached the peak of its power in the 12th and 13th centuries, with properties stretching across western Asturias and into the neighboring Province of León. Nonetheless, the monks were a major influence in the agricultural development of the region, as they introduced viticulture, as well as the raising of cereals and tobacco to Asturias. They also had an important influence on local methods of cattle-raising, with the establishment of pastures in the higher elevations of the land. Over the centuries, they also refined methods for more effective hunting and fishing on the abbatial lands, as well as for its management.

The monastic complex received various modifications and additions over the centuries, but a large fire in 1763 destroyed the building, with the exception of the 16th-century monastery church and its sacristy. The abbey was rebuilt in the Neoclassical style. The plans for the new building were designed by Lucas Ferro Caaveiro, a leading architect from Galicia. Due to his death in 1770, construction was begun in 1774 under the supervision of Ventura Rodríguez, using a rectangular layout with two courtyards, built around the abbey church located in a side wing. Among its surviving treasures are a 12th-century crucifix, popularly called the "Christ of the Cantonada". It is considered to be among the finest pieces of Romanesque art in Asturias. One consequence of the fire, however, is that the graves of King Bermudo and his family can no longer be identified.

== Natural park ==
Today the former abbey is a complex of structures classified as a Bien de Interés Cultural and protected by the Spanish government. It houses a parador and an interpretation center for a natural park.

== Primary sources ==
- El Libro Registro de Corias, 2 vols., ed. A. C. Floriano Cumbreño. Oviedo: 1950.

== Bibliography ==
- María Elida García García. San Juan Bautista de Corias: historia de un señorío monástico asturiano (siglos X–XV). Oviedo: Universidad de Oviedo, 1980.
