= Jimena Díaz =

Princess of Valencia and wife of Castilian warlord El Cid

Princess of Valencia
- Reign: 1099 – 1102
- Predecessor: Rodrigo Díaz de Vivar
- Successor: Yusuf ibn Tashfin

Princess consort of Valencia
- Tenure: 1094 – 1099
- Born: before July 1046; Kingdom of Leon
- Died: c. 1116; Kingdom of Leon
- Burial: Burgos Cathedral
- Spouse: Rodrigo Díaz de Vivar
- Issue: Diego Rodríguez; Cristina Rodríguez; María Rodríguez
- Father: Diego Fernández, Count of Oviedo
- Mother: Cristina

Doña Jimena Díaz, also spelled Ximena (Spanish: [xiˈmena ˈði.aθ]; Old Spanish: Ximena Díaz [ʃiˈmena ˈdi.adz̻]; before July 1046 (Note: Count Diego died before 24 July 1046 when his daughter Onneca Díaz and her husband Gundemaro Iohannes appear in a charter from the Cathedral of Oviedo as executors of his will.) – c. 1116), reigned as Princess of Valencia from 1099 to 1102. She was the wife and successor of El Cid, whom she married between July 1074 and 12 May 1076. The Principality of Valencia was an independent state founded by Jimena's husband.

== Biography ==
Jimena was the daughter of Diego Fernández, Count of Oviedo, the son of count Fernando Flaínez. Her mother was his wife Cristina. She was a sister of Fernando Díaz, Count of Asturias.

Upon marrying Rodrigo Díaz, Jimena Díaz accompanied her husband although it has remained unclear if she lived with him in the Taifa of Zaragoza during his first exile (from 1080 to 1086) as leader of the Andalusian army in service of Ahmah al-Muqtadir, Yusuf al-Mu'taman ibn Hud, and Al-Mustain II. There is also little historical certainty as to whether she moved with him in this period to Asturias, although there exists some documentation to suggest that she maintained a presence even during periods of separation (a legal action from Tol in 1083). (Note: In a charter from the Cathedral of Oviedo, the three siblings, Rodrigo, Fernando, and Jimena Díaz held up a legal action with the bishop regarding the right over the Tol monastery which belonged to the cathedral after having been donated by Gontrodo Gundemáriz, daughter of Gundemaro Pinióliz.)

At the beginning of the second exile of the Cid, in 1089, Jimena was imprisoned with her children, Cristina, Diego and María by mandate of Alfonso VI of León and Castile. Nothing else is known about Jimena until the end of 1094, when Rodrigo Díaz, on October 21, winning the battle of Cuarte, secured his control over Valencia (that he had conquered on June 17 of that year) and she was reunited with her husband until his death in 1099.

From this point she was Lady of Valencia until 1102 when Alfonso VI, her kinsman, decided to set fire to and abandon the city to the Almoravids in response to the impossibility of defending it. Alfonso VI escorted Jimena in her return to Castile. Around this period there remains a document of donation made by Jimena Díaz to the Cathedral of Valencia in 1101 containing her signature.

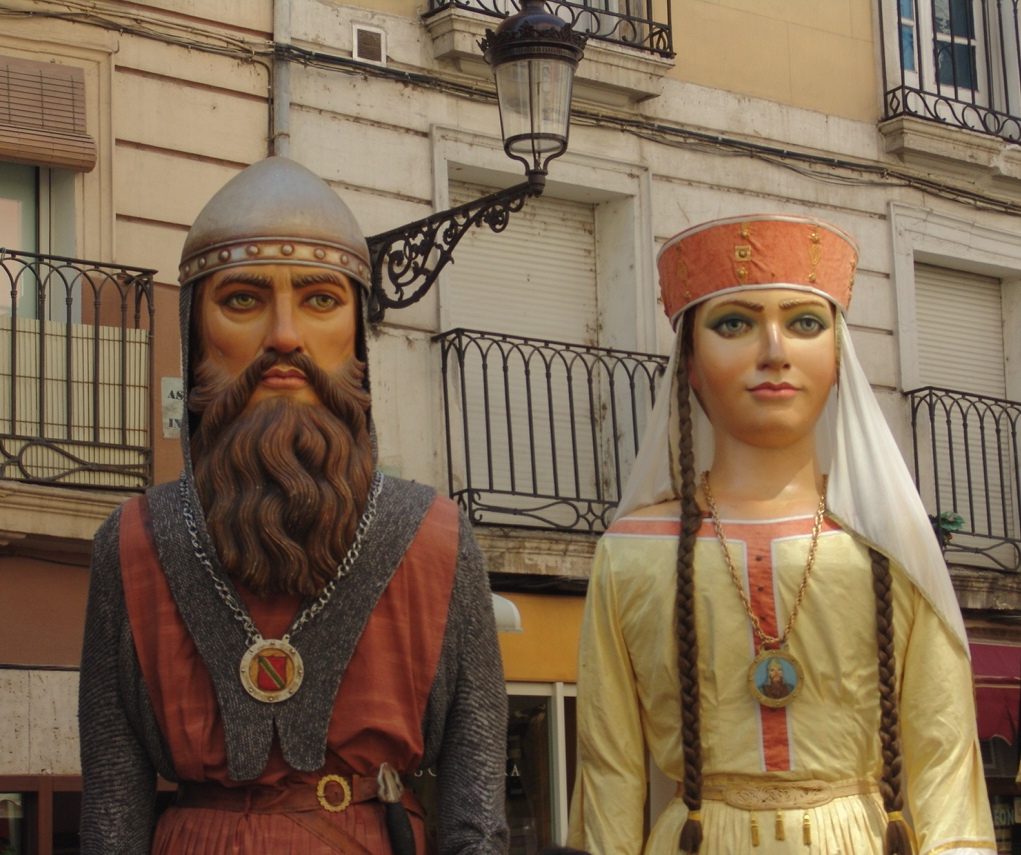
Modern sculptures representing Jimena and her husband

In 1103, she signed a document in the Monastery of San Pedro of Cardeña for the sale of a monastery that she owned to two canons of Burgos, although this fact does not necessarily mean that Jimena would have lived in the abbey during her old age, as was the legend maintained by the monastery until the 18th century in the hagiographic texts known as The Legend of Cardeña. It is more likely that she lived her last years in Burgos or in a nearby outlying area. She died sometime between August 29 of 1113 and 1116, probably in that final year. Of her three children, Diego was killed in battle fighting under Alfonso VI in 1097, Cristina married Ramiro Sánchez of Monzón and became mother of king García Ramírez of Navarre, while Maria was successively wife of a prince of Aragón and Ramon Berenguer III, Count of Barcelona.

== Burial ==
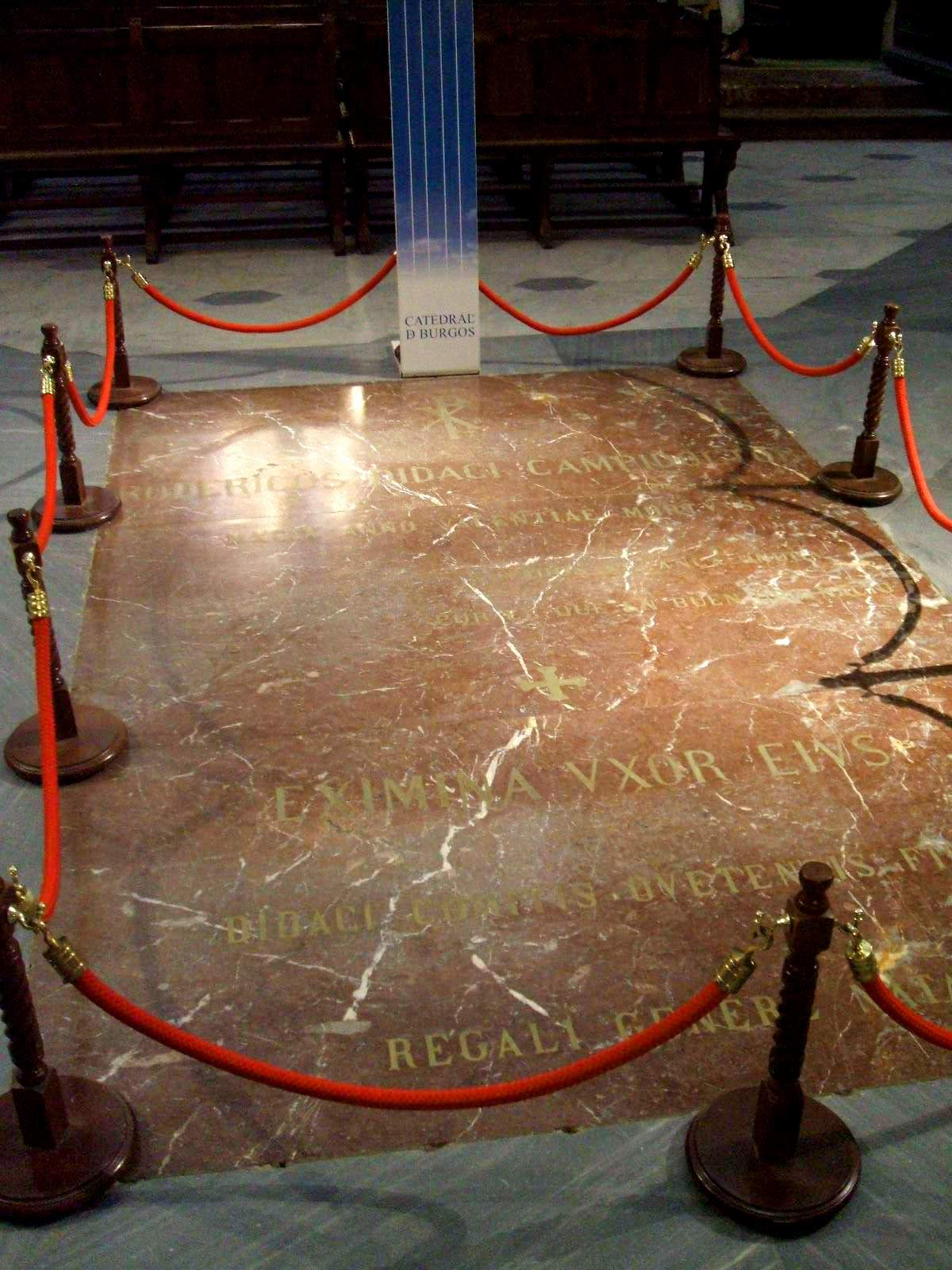
Tomb of Doña Jimena and her husband

Jimena and her husband were buried at San Pedro de Cardeña. After tombs were ransacked during the Napoleonic Wars, they were reburied in Burgos, and they now rest in Burgos Cathedral.

== See also ==
- Chimène (disambiguation)

== Bibliography ==
- Montaner Frutos, Alberto, ed. (2011). Cantar de mio Cid (in Spanish). Barcelona: Galaxia Gutenberg; Real Academia Española. ISBN 978-84-8109-908-9.
- Torres Sevilla-Quiñones de León, Margarita Cecilia (1999). Linajes nobiliarios de León y Castilla: Siglos IX-XIII (in Spanish). Salamanca: Junta de Castilla y León, Consejería de educación y cultura. ISBN 84-7846-781-5.
- Torres Sevilla-Quiñones de León, Margarita Cecilia (2000–2002). "El linaje del Cid" (PDF). Anales de la Universidad de Alicante. Historia Medieval (in Spanish) (13): 343–360. ISSN 0212-2480. Archived from the original (PDF) on 2013-10-17.

Jimena Díaz Born: before July 1046 Died: c. 1116
Regnal titles
Preceded by Rodrigo Díaz de Vivar	Lady of Valencia; 1099–1102	Succeeded by Yusuf ibn Tashfin as Emir of the Almoravids
