= Oveco Vermúdez =

Galician nobleman (fl. 1027-1042)

Oveco Vermúdez (fl. 1027–1042) was a Galician nobleman, the head of the Vela family.

Oveco was the eldest son of Count Vermudo Vélaz and Elvira Pinióliz. His father had died by 1027. By 1034, he held his father's title of count. His power base was in the region around Lugo, although he also inherited land in Asturias from his mother.

Oveco was a witness to two acts of King Vermudo III in 1034 and 1035, each time signing after Count Rodrigo Ordóñez and before Count Pedro Flagínez. A document from Lugo dated to 1042 gives him the unusual title dux (duke). He died later that year or shortly after.

Oveco's wife was Elvira Suárez. She was a granddaughter of Rodrigo Romániz and descended from Osorio Gutiérrez. They had three sons and a daughter:

- Vermudo Ovéquiz, the eldest, became count
- Vela Ovéquiz, became count
- Rodrigo Ovéquiz, became count, engaged in a rebellion with his mother in 1088
- Oneca Ovéquiz, married Count Sancho Ordóñez

== Sources ==
- Salazar Acha, Jaime (1985). "Una familia de la Alta Edad Media: Los Velas y su realidad historica". Estudios Genealógicos y Heráldicos. 1: 19–64.
