= Pelayo Rodríguez (count) =

Pelayo Rodríguez (fl. 985–1007) was a magnate and a count (comes) of the Kingdom of León and a common presence at the courts of Bermudo II (984–999) and Alfonso V (999–1028).

The historian Rubén García Álvarez suggested that he was a member of the family that founded the monastery of Lourenzá and probably a son of count Rodrigo Gutiérrez (fl. 945–992), while Julia Montenegro Valentín suggested he was brother of count Munio Rodríguez, sons of a hypothetical Rodrigo Fernández. The earliest document to mention him by name is dated to 976, but is considered false by Emilio Sáez. The next time he appears in the historical record is 8 July 985, as a witness to a donation to the monastery of Sahagún. He is a mainstay of royal charters until his last appearance on either 13 September 1005 or 1 February 1007. He rebelled with Gonzalo Vermúdez and Munio Fernández against Bermudo II, and succeeded in expelling the monarch from his kingdom between November 991 and September 992. After the revolt he was soon restored to royal favour.

He married Gotina Fernández, daughter of Fernando Bermúdez de Cea and Elvira Díaz. She was a sister of Jimena, queen of García Sánchez II of Pamplona, and thus an aunt of Sancho III the Great. She brought him many estates in Galicia and León proper. She joined her son, Fernando Peláez and his wife in making a donation to San Millán de la Cogolla on 13 November 1028, the last time she is recorded living, as donna Gutina. Other than Fernando she probably bore Pelayo two daughters: Fronilda, who married Ordoño Bermúdez, an illegitimate son of Bermudo II, and probably the Elvira who married Fernando Flaínez.
