= Vela Ovéquiz =

Galician count during the reigns of García II and Alfonso VI

Vela Ovéquiz or Ovéquez (died after June 1085) was a count in the Kingdom of Galicia during the reigns of García II (1065–71) and Alfonso VI (1071–1109). He and his family owned properties around Lugo, which controlled the entrance to Galicia from western Asturias, where he was also a landholder. He was probably a younger son of Oveco Bermúdez and his wife Elvira Suárez. He was married to Aldonza Muñoz, daughter of Count Muño Fernández and Elvira. They had a son, Rodrigo Vélaz, who was also a count.

On 28 February 1068, during the reign of García, Count Vela witnessed a royal charter issued to the monastery of San Antolín de Toques on the occasion of the consecration of Bishop Gudesteus of Iria Flavia. In the fall of 1071, after Alfonso VI had conquered the kingdom, Vela and his brothers Rodrigo and Bermudo attended his court and appear as counts and witnesses in several charters of the new king of Galicia.

Vela may have been killed in the great defeat at Zalaca on 23 October 1086. There is no full record of those slain in the battle, but several prominent Galicians disappear from the historical record around that time and they may have been part of a contingent known to have been particularly hard hit by the enemy. Vela's last recorded action was to witness a charter of 25 June 1085.

After the defeat, a rebellion broke out in Galicia in favour of the deposed king García. The forces of the Ovéquiz family seized the fortress of Lugo—with whose bishop they had long been in conflict—and killed the royal merino who was defending the town. It is possible that Vela took part in these events if he was not killed at Zalaca. The see of Lugo was definitely vacant at the time, and the previous bishop, Vistruaro, had probably died at Zalaca.

== Sources ==
- Barton, Simon. The Aristocracy in Twelfth-century León and Castile. Cambridge: Cambridge University Press, 1997.
- Reilly, Bernard F. The Kingdom of León-Castilla under King Alfonso VI, 1065–1109. Princeton, N.J.: Princeton University Press, 1988.
- Salazar Acha, Jaime (1985). "Una familia de la Alta Edad Media: Los Velas y su realidad historica". Estudios Genealógicos y Heráldicos. 1: 19–64.
