= Monastery of San Vicente de Oviedo =

Historic church and monastery in Oviedo, Spain

Coordinates: 43°21′46.23″N 5°50′33.46″W

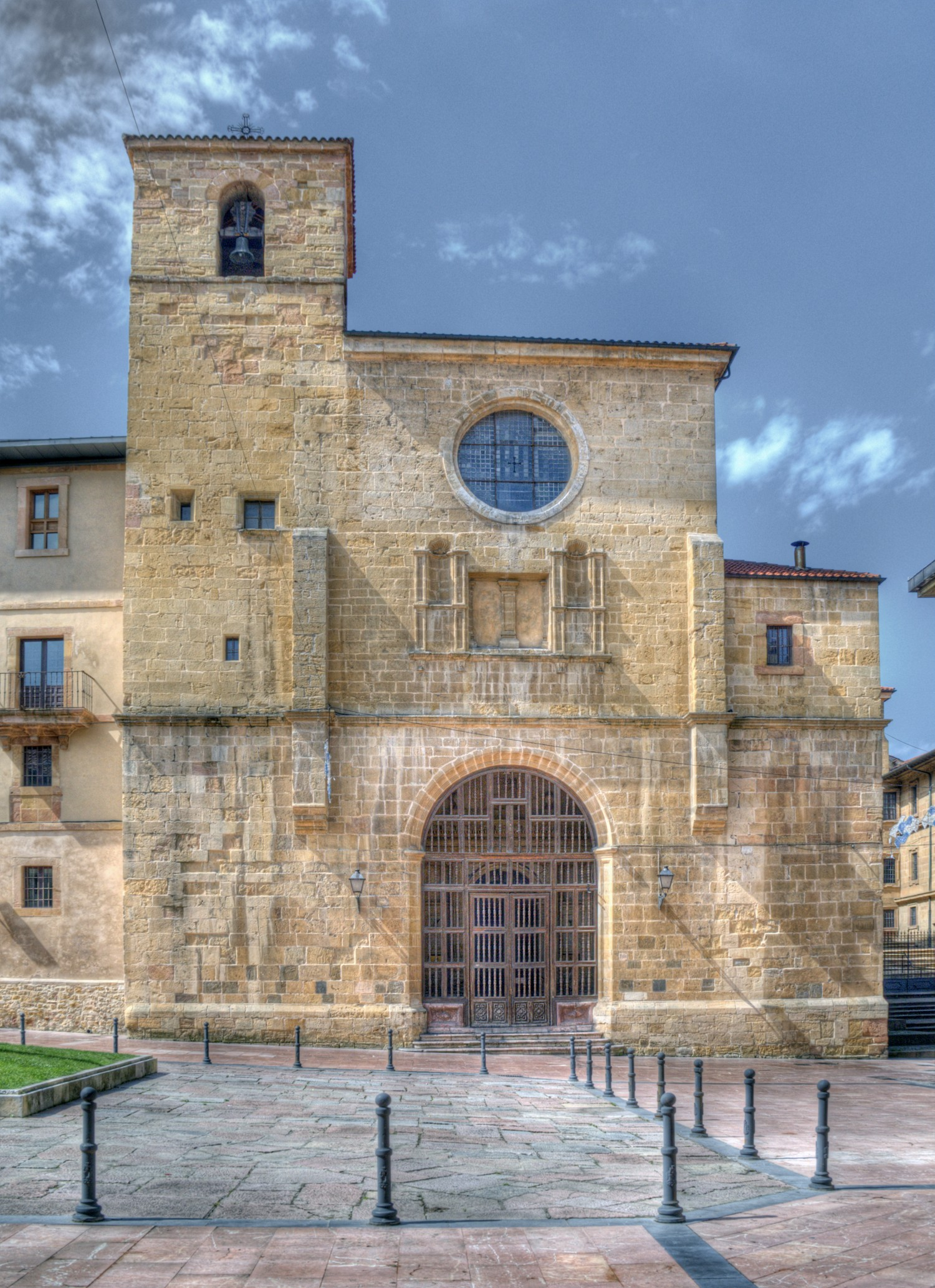
Monastery of San Vicente de Oviedo

San Vicente de Oviedo is a church and monastery in Oviedo, Spain. Its foundation in 761 is recorded in a charter known as the Pacto monástico de Oviedo ("Monastic Pact of Oviedo"). A copy made in the 12th century of the original that is dated 25 November 781 is considered the earliest document on the monarchy of the Kingdom of Asturias, although doubts exist as to the veracity of this document since the monastery, also called Antealtares in the Middle Ages, is not mentioned again until 969.

== Background ==
According to the charter of 781, twenty years before, in 761, the monks, Máximo, with his serfs, and Fromestano, founded a church in locum quod dicunt Oveto (the place called Oveto), which was to become the city of Oviedo. Fromestano and Maximo are considered the founders of the city and church. Fromestano, in the charter of 781, describes its founding: (Note: At the end of the 19th century, historian Ciriaco Miguel Vigil was the first author to claim that the 781 document was actually a non-authorised copy made in the 12th century.)

I, Frómista (Fromestano), abbot for the past twenty years, together with my nephew Máximo the monk, settled in this place, abandoned and uninhabited, founding a basilica in honor of Saint Vincent, a martyr of Christ and a deacon.

Transformed into a monastery, the first abbot was Oveco, documented between 969 and 978. The first reference mentioning that the monastery followed the Benedictine Rule is dated 1042.

The style of the building is Romanesque, although reworked in the 11th and 12th centuries. Its cloister is an official National Historic and Artistic Monument and, since 1952, has housed the Archaeological Museum of Asturias.

== Bibliography ==
- Calleja Puerta, Miguel; Sanz Fuentes, Mª Josefa (2011). "Fundaciones monásticas y orígenes urbanos: La refacción del documento fundacional de San Vicente de Oviedo". Iglesia y ciudad. Espacio y poder (Siglos VIII-XIII)(Collective work) (in Spanish). Ediciones de la Universidad de Oviedo: Instituto de Estudios Medievales, Universidad de León. ISBN 9788483179055.
