= Cervera (disambiguation) =

Cervera may refer to:

== Places ==
- Cervera, a city in Catalonia, Spain
- Cervera de la Cañada, a municipality in Aragon, Spain
- Cervera de Pisuerga, a municipality in the province of Palencia, Castile-León, Spain
- Cervera del Maestre (Valencian: Cervera del Maestrat), a municipality in the comarca of Baix Maestrat in the Valencian Community, Spain
- Cervera del Río Alhama, a municipality in La Rioja, Spain
- Cervera de la Marenda, a town in Northern Catalonia also known by its French name Cerbère
- Cervera de Buitrago, a municipality of the Community of Madrid, Spain
- Cervera del Llano, a municipality in Cuenca Province, Castile-La Mancha, Spain
- Cervera de los Montes, a municipality in the province of Toledo, Castile-La Mancha, Spain
- Cervera Mountains, a mountain range in the comarca of Baix Maestrat
- Espinosa de Cervera, a municipality located in the province of Burgos, Castile and León, Spain
- Rambla de Cervera, an intermittent river in the comarca of Baix Maestrat
- Tossal d'en Cervera, a mountain in Catalonia, Spain

== People ==
- Álvaro Cervera (born 1965), Spanish football player
- Carmen Cervera (born 1943), a Spanish philanthropist, socialite and art dealer and collector
- Julio Cervera Baviera (1854–1927), Spanish engineer
- Luisa Cervera (born 1964), Peruvian volleyball player
- Montserrat Cervera Rodon (born 1949), Catalan anti-militarist, feminist, and women's health activist
- Pascual Cervera y Topete (1839–1909), Spanish admiral
- Santiago Cervera Soto (born 1965), Spanish politician
- Víctor Cervera Pacheco (1936–2004), Mexican politician
- Violant Cervera (born 1969), Catalan politician

== Other ==
- Battle of Cervera
- Almirante Cervera-class cruiser, a class of Spanish Navy light cruisers
- Almirante Cervera, Spanish Navy light cruiser
