= Banu Gómez =

- Noble House
- Country: Kingdom of León
- Founder: Diego Muňoz
- Titles: Count of Saldaña, Count of Carrión, Count of Liébana, Count of Astorga

Banu Gómez lands under the senior line: Red dots represent the seats of their original counties, north to south, Liébana, Saldaña and Carrión; Orange, Sahagún, the monastery they patronized; Blue, places added by García Gómez, including León, the westernmost, only held briefly as rebel, Cea and Grajal (by Sahagún); Green, lands held by García's cousin, Munio Fernández, Astorga (left) and Cimanes de la Vega.

The Banu Gómez (Beni Gómez) were a powerful but fractious noble family living on the Castilian marches of the Kingdom of León from the 10th to the 12th centuries. They rose to prominence in the 10th century as counts in Saldaña, Carrión and Liébana, and reached their apogee when, allied with Córdoba warlord, Almanzor, their head, García Gómez, expelled king Vermudo II of León and briefly ruled there. He would reconcile with the royal family, but launched two subsequent rebellions. On his death, the senior line of the family was eclipsed, but a younger branch would return to prominence, producing Pedro Ansúrez, one of the premier noblemen under king Alfonso VI and queen Urraca in the late 11th and early 12th centuries. The family would be portrayed in the Cantar de Mio Cid as rivals and antagonists of the hero, El Cid, and their rebellions would serve as a basis for the legend of Bernardo del Carpio.

== Origin ==
The first documented member of the Banu Gómez was Diego Muñoz, Count in Saldaña. Two competing theories have been proposed for his parentage. Diego's patronymic, indicating his father's name was Munio, along with the family's holding of lands around Liébana led Castilian historian Justo Pérez de Urbel to suggest that his parents were the Munio Diaz and wife Gulatrudia, who appear in the documentation of San Martin de Liébana (later Santo Toribio) from the year 914. Pérez de Urbel noted in particular a 929 diploma of the widowed Gulatrudia witnessed by her children, including a Diego Muñoz. However, the other named children were all daughters, conflicting with the known family of the Saldaña Diego Muñoz, which likely included two brothers. Further, Gulatrudia's son is still found in Liébana in 964, after the reported death of the count in Saldaña. Thus, contrary to the Pérez de Urbel theory, the Liébana and Saldaña men named Diego Muñoz appear to be distinct.

A second theory is now more generally accepted. It is based in part on the reasoning that for the family to be called Banu Gómez (descendants of Gómez) in Al-Andalus sources, there must have been a Gómez in their immediate ancestry when Diego's 932 rebellion attracted notice in Córdoba. This led to the hypothesis that Diego's father was the Munio Gómez (Munio, son of Gómez), who held land near San Román (Santibáñez de la Peña), one of the centers of power of Diego Muñoz and his descendants. This Munio Gómez also witnessed charters of the monastery of Sahagún in 915, while count Diego Muñoz would give lands to Sahagún in 922.

Following a 920 campaign of Abd-ar-Rahman III against León, king Ordoño II launched a punitive expedition targeting the Castilian counts in the lands around Carrión who had not turned up to fight. Among those he brought back in chains were Abolmundar Albo and his son Diego. Medievalist Margarita Torres Sevilla proposed the identification of this Diego with the future count of Saldaña, and thus Abolmundar Albo with Munio Gómez, and the use of the Arabic kunya Abu al-Mundhir (Arabic: أبو المنذر, father of 'the warner') for this man suggests that he may have spent time in Córdoba, perhaps following capture in battle. She further suggests that such a captivity might explain the later alliance between the Banu Gómez and Córdoba. Others dismiss this hypothesis, and instead identify Abolmundar Albo with a count Rodrigo Díaz, known to have had a son Diego.

== Senior line ==
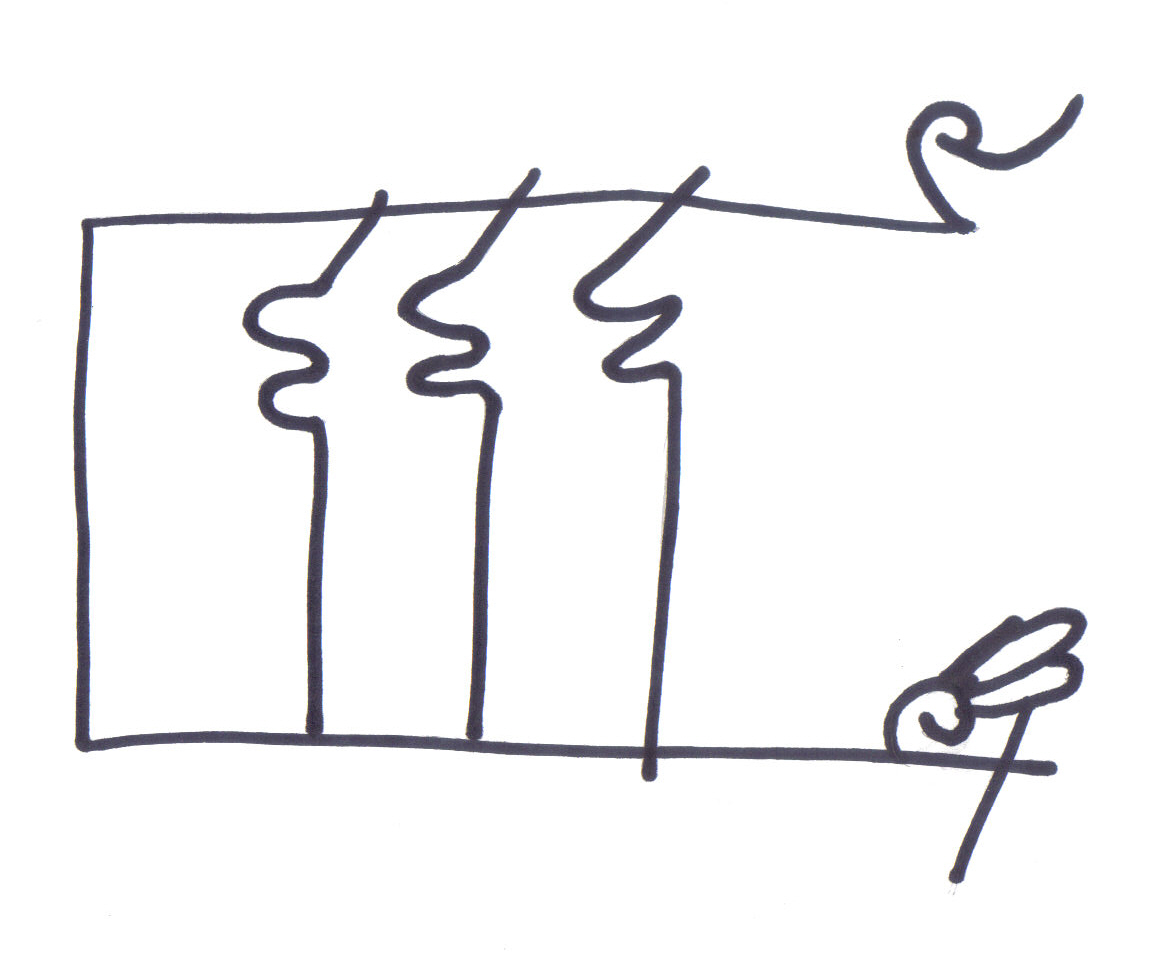
Signature mark of Diego Muñoz

Diego Muñoz is the first well-documented member of the Banu Gómez, and it is under him that the family first are reported by Al-Andalus chroniclers. This was in reporting a rebellion launched in 932 by the Banu Gómez and Banu Ansur, supporting the deposed former-king Alfonso against his incumbent brother, Ramiro II. Though not explicitly named, the Banu Gómez leader would have been Diego Muñoz, joining the Count of Castile, Fernando Ansúrez in a raid into the Leonese plains, where they defeated the king's army, but the rebellion came to naught, as Ramiro was able to capture and blind Alfonso and other rivals. Diego had returned to loyalty by 934, when the Banu Gómez are said to have joined Ramiro in supporting the new Castilian count, Fernán González, against a campaign by Abd ar-Rahman III, and in 936 Diego and apparent brother Osorio Muñoz (Note: Based on his patronymic and the use of the name Osorio for Diego's own son, he is hypothesized to be brother of Diego Muñoz. However, Rodríguez Marquina is skeptical of this relationship, and sees Osorio and a brother Ermenegildo Muňoz as sons of Munio Núñez, Count of Castile, and unrelated to Diego.) witnessed one of Ramiro's diplomas. The Banu Gómez again appear with the Banu Ansur in 941, joining the royal accord between Ramiro II and his allies, and Abd ar-Rahman III.

Diego Muñoz again rebelled. He disappears from royal diplomas from 940, and in 944 he and Fernán were imprisoned and deprived of their counties, but were released after swearing allegiance to the king, and he again appears as witness of royal grants, and he would be restored to his lands, appearing in 950 as Didacus Monnioz, come Saldanie (Diego Muñoz, count of Saldaña), and given a place of prominence, second only to Fernán González. He seems to have died in 951 or early 952. By his wife Tegridia, Diego had been father of sons Munio, Gómez, Osorio and Fernando Díaz, and daughters Elvira and Gontroda Díaz. Through the daughter Elvira, who married count Fernando Bermúdez of Cea, they would be grandparents of queen Jimena Fernández, wife of García Sánchez II of Pamplona. Three sons married the daughters of counts, illustrating the social standing of the family. Diego was succeeded in the county of Saldaña by his brother Gómez Muñoz, who is seen as count in 959 and 960, and on his death, his nephew Gómez Díaz, the son of Diego, followed.

Gómez Díaz first appears with his parents in 940, and in 946 he married Muniadomna, daughter of his father's ally, Fernán González of Castile. Like his father, he would be a close ally of the counts of Castile, and would marry two of his children to the children of count García Fernández of Castile. He likewise allied himself with the regent, Elvira Ramírez of León, during the reign of king Ramiro III of León, the boy king who would be married to another child of Gómez, his daughter Sancha Gómez. By 977 he would be ruling in Liébana, and apparently also in Carrión, in addition to Saldaña, and the same year, he sent an embassy to Caliph Al-Hakam II at Córdoba. He likely fought in the disastrous Battle of San Esteban de Gormaz, where a coalition of Christian forces organized by Elvira was soundly defeated, a loss that led the Galician nobility to elevate a competitor for the throne, Ramiro's cousin Bermudo Ordóñez. The Banu Gómez remained allies of Ramiro, controlling armies from their own lands and the Tierra de Campos. As such, Gómez found himself excluded from court when in 985 the Galician candidate proved successful, supplanting Ramiro and taking the crown of León as Bermudo II. The next year, when Almanzor launched a military campaign against León, the army passed through Banu Gómez lands unmolested, and perhaps even launched an attack on the capitol from Gómez's county of Carrión itself, an apparent indication of a Banu Gómez/Córdoba alliance. Gómez is last seen the next year acting with his brother Osorio Díaz, and it thought to have died in 987. He was succeeded by his son, García Gómez, having further children, counts Velasco, Sancho and Munio Gómez, queen Sancha, wife of Ramiro II, and apparently Urraca, wife of Sancho García of Castile.

=== García Gómez ===
Count García Gómez appears as count during his father's life, and came into his patrimony as the new king, Bermudo II, struggled to hold onto his crown in the face of rebellious nobility in the east and attacks from the Caliphate of Córdoba to the south. The year after his father's death, García initiated the first of his rebellions, calling himself elaborately proconsul dux eninentor in a 988 document, before being suppressed in early 989. He had married Muniadomna González, daughter of count Gonzalo Vermúdez, and when Almanzor again marched on León in 990, García and Gonzalo, and García's uncle Osorio Díaz joined him. Bermudo was forced to flee to Galicia. García would govern the eastern part of the kingdom, including the eponymous capitol, on Córdoba's behalf, referring to himself as 'ruling in León' in 990 (imperantem Garceani Gomiz in Legione). However, by mid-year the king regained the capitol and forced García to take refuge around Liébana. In 991, the king divorced his Galician wife, Velasquita, in favor of a new marriage to the daughter of the Count of Castile, García Fernández, leading to a new rebellion headed by her kin. Her sister was wife of Gonzalo Vermúdez and mother-in-law of García, and these two, along with count Pelayo Rodríguez and a junior member of the Banu Gómez, Munio Fernández would again force Bermudo to abandon León by 992, but the next year he again was able to return and suppress the rebellion.

Almanzor again attacked León in 995, but this time his army also sacked Carrión in retaliation for the withdrawal of García Gómez from an agreement to supply troops to the Córdoban army. García would again be at odds with Córdoba in 1000, when he and his brother-in-law Sancho García of Castile fought the Battle of Cervera against Almanzor. There a brother, apparently count Velasco Gómez, was killed. The deaths of Bermudo in 1000 and Almanzor in 1002 changed the political landscape, and the Banu Gómez were, at first, on friendly terms with the new child-monarch in León, and García, along with his brother count Sancho Gómez and uncle count Fernando Díaz signed a treaty with Almanzor's son Al-Muzzafar that included an agreement to supply troops. In 1005, García would incorporate Cea and Grajal into his territories, and amidst conflict with the Leonese king's guardian, count Menendo González, would claim the title 'count of León', implying another rebellion. In 1009, the Banu Gómez would support another son of Almanzor, Sanchuelo, in an unsuccessful attempt to reinstate him, and a member of the Banu Gómez would be killed with Sanchuelo in Córdoba. Historically, this has been identified with García, yet he appears in later documents so it must have been a different family member, perhaps his cousin, Fáfila Fernández or Sancho Gómez. He is last seen in 1015, and died within the next few years, the last 'great count' of the family. The possessions seem to have been dispersed among his brother, Munio Gómez, who held Liébana, having a childless marriage to a Banu Gómez kinswoman Elvira Fáfilaz, and her uncles, Munio Fernández, count in Astorga, and Diego Fernández, whose descendants would lead a resurgence of the family late in the century.

== Junior lines ==
The eventual heads of the family in succession to the senior line descended from count Fernando Díaz, a younger son of Diego Muñoz and Tegridia, who obtained lands in the Tierra de Campos through a marriage to Mansuara Fáfilaz, daughter of count Fáfila Oláliz. Some of these lands around Sahagún were reclaimed from his son Diego by king Alfonso V of León following the death of García Gómez. In addition to eldest son Diego, they were parents of Fáfila, Osorio and Munio. Count Fáfila Fernández was father of two known children, a daughter, Elvira, married to the last of the senior line of the family, Munio Gómez, and a poorly-documented son, Ordoño Fáfilaz. Munio Fernández would inherit the lands of his brother Osorio, and became count in Astorga, and a rebel collaborator of García Gómez.

Diego Fernández was a relatively minor nobleman under Alfonso V. His wife Marina is thought to have been a descendant of the Banu Ansur, Counts of Monzón: they named a younger son Ansur, and appear to have split the Banu Ansur lands with the Counts of Castile. He died in 1029, leaving three sons, Fernando, Ansur and Gómez. These would all be members of the pro-Navarre faction of the Leonese nobility, and are absent from court during most of the reign of Bermudo III of León. Of these, Fernando Díaz would marry Elvira Sánchez, heiress of Banu Gómez senior-line member, count Sancho Gómez, and through her apparently gained control of the family's holdings in Liébana that had been held by Sancho's widow, Toda García, who was aunt to the Pamplona queen, Muniadona of Castile. Following the death of Sancho III of Pamplona, he appears at court and is given the rank of count, but he died not long thereafter, in 1038, leaving children who were all dead without issue by 1060. His younger brother, Ansur Díaz, would be in the service of the Navarrese Count of Castile who succeeded as Ferdinand I of León. He appears as count from 1042, and died 30 September 1047, leaving sons Pedro, Diego, Gonzalo and Fernando, Pedro being born to a first wife whose identity is unknown, and at least Diego to a second wife, Justa Fernández, daughter of count Fernando Flaínez.

The youngest son of Diego Fernández, Gómez Díaz, likewise appears as count in 1042, and succeeded in reacquiring most of the dispersed lands once held by the senior line of the family, receiving Liébana and Carrión following the death of his brother Fernando, and wresting Saldaña from the family of Alfonso Díaz, to whom it had passed with the extinction of the senior line of Banu Gómez. His status was further amplified by his marriage to Teresa Peláez, daughter of count Pelayo Fróilaz and Aldonza Ordóñez, a granddaughter of both of the rival kings, Ramiro III and Bermudo II. By her he had sons Fernando, Pelayo and García, and daughters María, Sancha, Aldonza (Eslonza) and Elvira. On his death, control of the family lands would pass to his eldest nephew, Pedro Ansúrez and his own branch would be briefly eclipsed.

Lands held or controlled by Pedro Ansúrez, and his exiles: clockwise from top, Liébana, Cabezón, Entrepeñas, Saldaña, Carrión, Melgar, Torremormojón, Valladolid, Simancas, Tordesillas, Toro and Zamora, plus Madrid to the south, not all controlled simultaneously; blue, count Pedro's exiles: Toledo (1072) to the south, where he would later also hold land, and the County of Urgell (1105) to the east.

=== Pedro Ansúrez ===
Pedro, son of Ansur Díaz, would reclaim the power the family previously had, becoming the most prominent Leonese nobleman of his time. He was majordomo to Alfonso VI in 1067 and first appears as count the next year. He and his brothers, Gonzalo and Fernando, are said to have accompanied Alfonso VI during his brief exile in Toledo. In 1074 was governing Santa Maria de Carrión (from which he is usually called Count of Carrión), and added San Román de Entrepeñas and probably Saldaña in 1077. In 1084 he controlled Zamora, Toro, and Tordesillas, in 1101 he added Liébana. He fell afoul of the court intrigues surrounding the sons-in-law of Alfonso VI of León and Castile, and was exiled, by 1105 appearing in the County of Urgell, where as guardian of his young grandson, count Ermengol VI, he allied the county with the Kingdom of Aragón and County of Barcelona in their joint campaign against the Almoravids. He and his brother Gonzalo appear to have been deprived of their lands in León at this time. He returned to León in 1109 and for negotiating the marriage of the dead king's heiress Urraca to Alfonso the Battler, he was restored to much of his land and his comital dignity in 1109 and would remain closely associated with Queen Urraca during subsequent years. To this he added Melgar de Arriba, Simancas, Cabezón and Torremormojón. He died in 1118. He had married Eylo Alfonso, of the Alfonsos of the Tierra de Campos, and they were tasked with moving settlers to the lands around Valladolid, of which Pedro served as governor. He and Eylo had sons Peter, who died as a child, and Fernando, who was a minor land tenant near Entrepeñas, while they had three daughters, Mayor, married to count Álvar Fáñez, María, married to Ermengol V, Count of Urgell, and Urraca. With his death, power in the family passed back to the family of his uncle and predecessor, Gómez Díaz, rather than Pedro's children or brother. The latter, Gonzalo Ansúrez first appeared as count in 1075 at Liébana, and he figures prominently in the Poema del Mio Cid. He would marry Urraca Bermúdez, daughter of count Bermudo Ovéquiz, and by her had children Pedro, Rodrigo, Cristina, and Sancha, who married count Fernando Pérez de Traba. Gonzalo died between 1120 and 1124. His half-brother, count Diego Ansúrez, inherited from his mother lands in Asturias, and would be active in the Astorga region in the 1070s, before dying in the early 1080s (perhaps 1081), leaving by his wife Tezguenza Rodríguez a sole daughter, Elvira. She died without issue.

=== Later counts ===
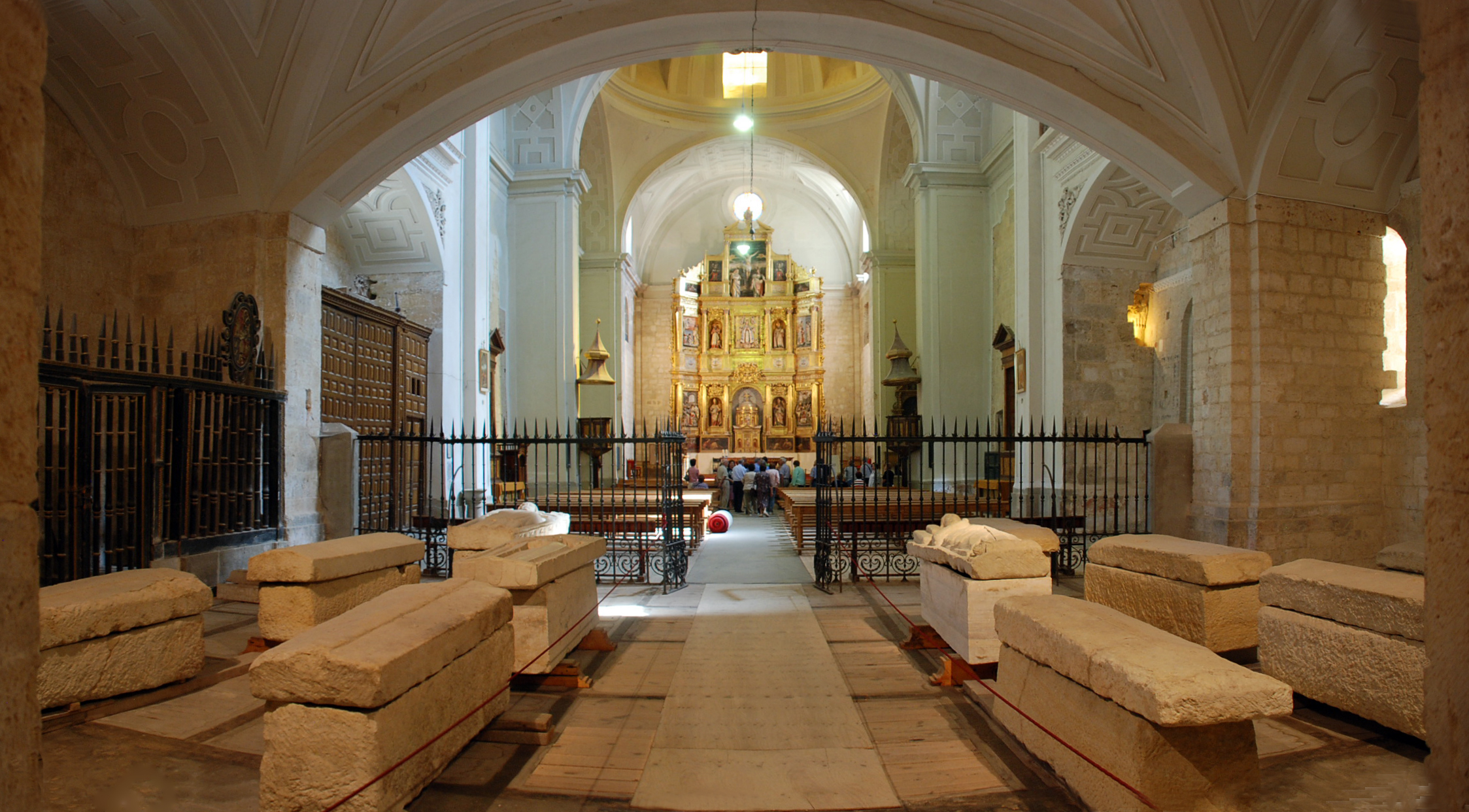
La Galilea. Pantheon of the Banu Gómez in the monastery of San Zoilo in Carrión de los Condes.

The last counts of the family of the Banu Gómez were the sons and grandsons of Gómez Díaz and Teresa Peláez. Of their children, García Gómez was educated by his maternal uncles and appears frequently at the court of Alfonso VI. He was probably killed at the Battle of Uclés in 1108. Another brother, Fernando, rarely appears, and died in 1083. It was Pelayo Gómez who would be the next family head. He married Elvira Muñoz, half-sister of count Rodrigo Muñoz, giving him a new power-base in Galicia, including an interest on the monastery of Santa Maria de Ferreira de Pallares. He died in 1101, and was interred at San Zoilo de Carrión, where his wife, children and grandchildren would also be buried. Two known sons became counts. Munio and Gómez Peláez. Gómez was a count under queen Urraca, in the 1110s, with interest in the Tierra de Campos. He died in 1118, having married Mayor García, daughter of count García Ordóñez and granddaughter of king García Sánchez III of Pamplona, having children García, Pelayo, Diego, Urraca, and Teresa.

Munio Peláez first appears in the late years of Alfonso VI, in 1105. He received Monterroso in 1112, and was a count by 1115. In 1120, he defected to Queen Urraca's son, the future king Alfonso VII of León, and was imprisoned, but he was one of the more powerful Galician counts after Alfonso succeeded his mother in 1126. Munio married Lupa Pérez de Traba daughter of count Pedro Fróilaz de Traba. Munio is last seen in 1042. He and Lupa had three daughters, Elvira, Aldonza and Teresa Muňoz, wife of Fernando Odoáriz, and sons Fernando, Pedro and Bernardo. This Pedro Muñoz never achieved the status of count, and seems mostly have been closely tied to his property at Aranga. He married Teresa Rodríguez, and had children identified in a genealogy of the patrons of Santa Maria de Ferreira de Pallares. These were a son García, otherwise unknown, and a daughter Aldonza, whose marriage to Rodrigo Fernández de Toroño, alférez to the king, produced heiresses who married Gonzalo Rodríguez Girón and Martín Gómez de Silva.

=== Astorga line ===
In addition to the lines of the family that controlled Saldaña and Carrión, a branch of the family was briefly prominent in the late 10th and early 11th century is the area of Astorga, represented by count Munio Fernández. A younger son of count Fernando Díaz, he was a prominent landholder on the Tierra de Campos, due not only to lands that came from his mother, Mansuara Fáfilaz, but also having inherited from his brother Osorio when the latter died. He married Elvira Fróilaz, daughter of count Fruela Vela. Like his cousin, count García Gómez, he was a leader of the rebellion in 922, instigated when king Bermudo II repudiated his wife, Velasquita, to establish a new marital alliance with the counts of Castile. In alliance with Córdoba, the rebels briefly forced the king to abandon the capitol, but on his recovery of the kingdom, Bermudo deprived Munio and his co-conspirators of many of their lands. He seems to have been rehabilitated by 997, when he appears as count and was exercising judicial authority in the region of Astorga, he also had acquired rights in Cimanes de la Vega. He would hold a more prestigious position under Bermudo's successor, being count of Astorga and continually appearing among the closest circle of nobles around the king. The record is silent regarding whether he joined his cousin in his later rebellion against Alfonso V, and he only appears periodically in later years, dying between 1013 and 1016.

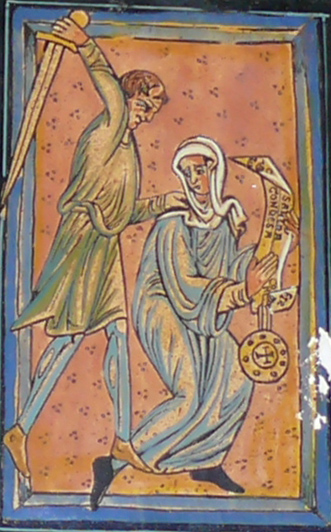
Murder of countess Sancha Muñiz, daughter of Munio Fernández, count of Astorga, illustrated in the Libro de las Estampas

Of his children, only a daughter, countess Sancha Muñiz, achieved similar prominence. Following the death of her first husband, Pedro Fernández, in 1028, and subsequently that of their only daughter, Elvira, Sancha controlled significant properties. She was patron of the monastery of San Antolín, and she contributed significant funds to the construction of León Cathedral. She had two subsequent marriages, to counts Pelayo Muñiz and Rodrigo Galíndez. She is perhaps best known for the illustration of her murder, by a nephew, that is illustrated in the Libro de las Estampas, and for her memorial tomb in León Cathedral. Of her sibling, eldest brother Pedro Muñiz began to appear in documents in 1002. He had a single son, Nuño Pérez, apparently the nephew implicated in Sancha's murder. Other children of Munio Fernández were daughters Teresa, successively wife of Godesteo Díaz and Pedro Fróilaz, count of Bierzo, and María, as well as an additional son, Juan Muñiz. Juan in turn had sons Juan, Alfonso, Munia, wife of Osorio Osóriz, and Munio Johannes, who was father of Pedro Muñiz and Elsonza, wife of Pedro Ovéquez, in whose descendants the inheritance of this branch seems to have been vested.

== Additional proposed branches ==
In addition to the well characterized branches of the family, two other prominent families in kingdom of León have been suggested to be branches of the Banu Gómez, though in neither case has the identification been universally accepted. The first of these is the family sometimes referred to as The Alfonso, descendants of nobleman Alfonso Díaz from the Tierra de Campos at the end of the 10th and early 11th century. He married an heiress of the Banu Mirel clan, and his family became major landholders in the region over the next several generations, until each of the branches ended in the male line. The heiresses they engendered would provide major landholdings to their spouses and descendants, among whom were the Osorio, Lara, and Castro families. Likewise, the heiress of one branch, Elo Alfonso, would bring her branch's share to her husband Pedro Ansúrez, and thus contributed to the resurgence of the junior line of the Banu Gómez. The patronymic of founder Alfonso Díaz, his apparent origin in the region of Liébana, and his appearance in close proximity to the Banu Gómez in documents have led to the supposition that he represented another son of the first Banu Gómez count, Diego Muñoz. However, he does not appear among the listed children of Diego and Tegridia in any charter, and he lived to 1024, more than 70 years after Diego's death in the early 950s, making a father-son relationship extremely unlikely.

The second family proposed to be descended from the Banu Gómez is that of count García Ordóñez, prominent in the reign of king Alfonso VI who as tutor of the king's son was killed along with the prince at the Battle of Uclés in 1108. He is known to have been son of the Castilian count Ordoño Ordóñez, whom tradition identifies with the son of the infantes Ordoño Ramírez and Cristina Bermúdez, both children of kings of León. However, Jaime de Salazar y Acha points out that not only does the geographical sphere of the Castilian Ordoño seem to be distinct from the landholdings of the infantes, but that the earliest accounts of the family of the two infantes give them no son named Ordoño. It was only much later, in the 13th century, when chroniclers begin to assign to them a son named Ordoño, which Salazar y Acha attributes to the misreading of earlier sources. He thought that though the career of the Castilian count demonstrates he must have been a member of the high nobility, he seems to have no connection with the infantes. Instead, Salazar y Acha proposes that the Castilian count was the son of Ordoño Fafílaz, of the junior branch of the Banu Gómez. García Ordóñez was father of count García Garcés de Aza, and likely also was father of Fernando García de Hita, founder of the powerful House of Castro that contested control of the country with the Laras during the tumultuous minority of Alfonso VIII of Castile.

== In legend ==
An indication of the power and historical impact of the Banu Gómez is seen through their roles in two medieval epics of the Iberian peninsula. The tale of Bernardo del Carpio first appears in the 13th century, and relates the saga of the son of a legendary Sancho Díaz, count of Saldaña. The father had been blinded and imprisoned over his love for, and perhaps marriage to, Jimena, the sister of king Alfonso II of Asturias. Their son, Bernardo is raised by Alfonso as heir, but his attempts to get the king to release his father come to naught, and he eventually turns to rebellion and revenge. At Roncevaux he defeats a Carolingian army sent to support the Asturian monarch in exchange for Alfonso naming the Frankish king his successor. Bernardo forms an alliance with the Moors to attack León and Astorga. The presentation of Bernardo is ambivalent, in that his resistance to the foreign Carolingian armies is viewed as heroic, yet this is tempered by this traitorous collaboration with the Muslims. The epic appears to combine two distinct narratives, an Old French tale related to The Song of Roland (a variant related then dismissed by one of the earliest surviving versions instead makes Bernardo a nephew of Charlemagne, like the Roland of The Song) that would be merged with a native Iberian story involving the rebellion of the counts of Saldaña, while also drawing from the 13th century internecine disputes between the Kingdoms of León and Castile. Pick points to several parallels, geographic and thematic, between this legendary tale of a count of Saldaña and the historical fractious relationship between the senior line of the Banu Gómez and the Leonese kings.

The second legendary representation of the Banu Gómez builds on the historical antagonism between Rodrigo Díaz de Vivar, El Cid, and the family of count Pedro Ansúrez. The Cantar de Mio Cid tells of the marriage of the two daughters of El Cid, Elvira and Sol, to the Infantes de Carrión, Diego and Fernando González. The brothers respond to the humiliating failure of their plot to assassinate one of El Cid's allies by binding and beating their wives, and abandoning them in a forest to be eaten by wolves. They are rescued, and El Cid demands the return of their dowry, two famous battle swords, and obtains an annulment of the marriages, and sees them instead married to a prince of Navarre and a prince of Aragón. The Infantes de Carrión themselves are not historical figures. They bear a patronymic suggesting they were sons of Gonzalo Ansúrez, brother of count Pedro. However, this Gonzalo's sons included neither a Diego nor a Fernando, though he did have brothers Diego and Fernando Ansúrez, while the same names appear elsewhere among the Banu Gómez as younger sons of count Gómez Díaz. Men named Diego and Fernando González appear together in contemporary records, but there is no indication they were linked to Carrión and the Banu Gómez. The infantes are best viewed as literary constructs, composite characters intended to embody the rivalry and antagonism between El Cid and the Banu Gómez.

== Family tree ==
Banu Gómez family tree

Gómez
Munio; Gómez fl. 915
Tegrida	Diego; Muñoz count of Saldaña d. 951/2	Gómez; Muñoz count of Saldaña fl. 959-60	Osorio; Muñoz	Fáfila; Oláliz count
Fernán; González count of Castile
Elvira; Díaz	Fernando; Bermúdez count of Cea	Munio; Díaz	Osorio; Díaz count	Gontroda; Díaz	Fernando; Díaz count	Mansuara; Fáfilaz
García; Fernández count of Castile	Muniadomna; Fernández	Gómez; Díaz; Count of Saldaña
García; Sánchez II king of Pamplona	Jimena; Fernández
Osorio; Fernández	Gómez Fernández	Fáfila; Fernández count	Munio; Fernández count of Astorga
Diego; Fernández count
Sancho; García count of Castile	Urraca; Gómez	García; Gómez count of Saldaña m. Muniadomna; González	Velasco; Gómez count †1000	Munio; Gómez count	Elvira; Fáfilaz	Ordoño; Fáfilaz
Ramiro III king of León	Sancha; Gómez	Toda; García	Sancho; Gómez count
Enderquina; Ordóñez	Ora; Ordóñez
Muniadona; Sánchez	Sancho; Garcés III king of Pamplona
Fernando; Díaz count	Elvira; Sánchez	Ansur; Díaz count	Gómez; Díaz count
Sancha; Muñiz	Pedro; Fernández count
Alfonso; Muñiz count	Sancho; Fernández	Urraca; Fernández	Toda; Fernández
Teresa; Muñiz	María; Muñiz	Pedro; Muñiz	Juan; Muñiz
Elo; Alfonso	Pedro; Ansúrez count	Fernando; Ansúrez	Gonzalo; Ansúrez count	Diego; Ansúrez count
Fernando; Gómez	María; Gómez countess	Sancha; Gómez	Elvira; Gómez
Alfonso; Pérez	María; Pérez	Fernando; Pérez	Pelayo; Gómez count	García; Gómez	Aldonza; Gómez	Nuño; Pérez
Mayor; Pérez	Urraca; Pérez	Elvira; Díaz
Juan; Johannes	Alfonso; Johannes	Munio; Johannes	Munia; Johannes
Pedro; González	Rodrigo; González	Cristina; González	Sancha; González	Munio; Peláez count	Gómez; Peláez count
Pedro; Muñiz	Ildonza; Muñiz
Fernando; Muñoz	Pedro; Muñoz	Bernardo; Muñoz	Elvira; Muñoz	Aldonza; Muñoz	Teresa; Muñez
García; Gómez	Pelayo; Gómez	Diego; Gómez	Urraca; Gómez	Teresa; Gómez
García; Pérez	Aldonza; Pérez	Rodrigo; Fernández de Toroño

== Bibliography ==
- Barón Faraldo, Andrés (2009). "Poder y vasallaje en los siglos XI y XII. La militia de Pedro Ansúrez, conde de Carrión y Saldaña". Publicaciones de la Institución Tello Téllez de Meneses (80): 151–184.
- Barton, Simon (1997). The Aristocracy in Twelfth-century León and Castile.
- Calderón Medina, Inés (2011). "La antroponimia de la nobleza plenomedieval. Un elemento de construcción de identidad y memoria nobiliaria". Miscelánea Medieval Murciana. 35: 67–88. ISSN 0210-4903.
- Martínez Díez, Gonzalo (2005). El condado de Castilla, 711–1038: La historia frente a la leyenda.
- Martínez Díez, Gonzalo (2007). "Los infantes de Carrión del Cantar cidiano y su nula historicidad" (PDF). Historia, Instituciones, Documentos. 34: 207–223.
- Martínez Sopena, Pascual (1987). "Parentesco y Poder en Leon Durante el Siglo XI. La "Casata" de Alfonso Diaz". Studia Historica. Historia Medieval. 5: 33–87.
- Montenegro Valentín, Julia (1987). "El torno a los origines familiares de Diego Muñoz, el primer conde de Saldaña". Actas del I Congreso de Historia de Palencia. Vol. 2. pp. 339–51.
- Pick, Lucy K. (2016). "Rebel Nephews and Royal Sisters: The Tale of Bernardo del Carpio". Charlemagne and His Legend in Early Spanish Literature and Historiography. Cambridge: D. S. Brewer. pp. 44–65.
- Reilly, Bernard F. (2007). "The Rediscovery of Count Pedro Ansúrez". Cross, crescent and conversion : studies on medieval Spain and christendom in memory of Richard Fletcher. pp. 109–126.
- Rodriquez Marquina, Javier (1976). "Las Salinas de Castilla en el Siglo X, y la Genealogia de las Familias Condales". Homenaje a Fray Justo Perez de Urbel, OSB. pp. 143–51.
- Salazar y Acha, Jaime de (1990). "Los Descendientes del Conde Ero Fernández, Fundador del Monasterio de Santa María de Ferreira de Pallares". El Museo de Pontevedra (in Spanish) (43): 67–86. ISSN 0210-7791.
- Salazar y Acha, Jaime de (1986). "Una hija desconocida de Sancho el Mayor reina de León" (PDF). Príncipe de Viana, anejo (in Spanish) (8). Ejemplar dedicado a: Primer Congreso General de Historia de Navarra (1986), Pamplona: 183–192. ISSN 1137-7054.
- Salazar y Acha, Jaime de (1991). "El linaje castellano de Castro en el siglo XII: consideraciones e hipótesis sobre su origen". Anales de la Real Academia Matritense de Heráldica y Genealogía. 1: 33–68.
- Senra Gabriel y Galán, José L. (2006). "Mio Cid es de Bivar e nos de los Condes de Carrión: Los Banu Gómez de Carrión a la luz de sus epitafios" (PDF). Quintana (5): 233–267.
- Torres Sevilla-Quiñones de León, Margarita Cecilia (1995). "Un rebelde en la corte de Vermudo II: García Gómez, conde de Saldaña". Actas del III Congreso de Historia de Palencia. Vol. 2. pp. 693–703. ISBN 84-8173-035-1.
- Torres Sevilla-Quiñones de León, Margarita Cecilia (1999). Linajes nobiliarios de León y Castilla: Siglos IX-XIII. Salamanca: Junta de Castilla y León, Consejería de educación y cultura. ISBN 84-7846-781-5.
- Torres Sevilla-Quiñones de León, Margarita Cecilia; Galván Freile, Fernando (1995). "La condesa Doña Sancha: Una nueva aproximación a su figura". Medievalismo: Boletín de la Sociedad Española de Estudios Medievales. 5: 9–30.
