= Rodrigo Muñoz (disambiguation) =

Rodrigo Muñoz is an Uruguayan footballer (soccer player).

Rodrigo Muñoz may also refer to:

- Rodrigo Muñoz (Asturian count), died in or shortly after 1116, a count in León
- Rodrigo Muñoz de Guzmán, died ca. 1186, founder of the Castilian House of Guzmán
- Rodrigo Muñoz (Galician count), a count in León, killed in the Battle of Sagrajas in 1086
