= García Gómez =

García Gómez (died after 1017) was a Leonese count, at least from 971. He was the eldest son of Gómez Díaz and Muniadomna Fernández, daughter of Fernán González, Count of Castile. From his father, the head of the Banu Gómez family, he inherited the counties of Saldaña, Carrión, and Liébana.

By a charter dated 15 May 984 García donated some property at Calzadilla de Cueza to the Monastery of Sahagún. On 1 September 986 he witnessed a donation of his supposed uncle Osorio Díaz of the villa Arcello to the same monastery.

García married Muniadomna, daughter of Gonzalo Vermúdez and Ildonza Ramírez and a niece of Velasquita Ramírez, the queen of Vermudo II of León. In 988–9 he and his father-in-law, perhaps with the support of the Ansúrez clan, were in rebellion against Vermudo II. Leagued with Almanzor, the Muslim hajib, who marched on León, the rebels forced Vermudo to take refuge in Galicia and expelled the counts of Monzón from the Tierra de Campos. The entire land between Zamora and Castie, including León itself, was in the hands of García, governing under the authority of Almanzor. He went so far as to title himself "ruling (imperante) in León" in the early months of 990. In 990 Vermudo returned and ousted the rebels, who quickly reconciled with him.

García Gómez also supported the revolt between November 991 and September 992 that expelled Vermudo from the kingdom, a revolt led by his father-in-law, Munio Fernández, and count Pelayo Rodríguez. He was on better terms with Vermudo's successor, Alfonso V.

On 29 June 1000 he participated in the Battle of Cervera. According to Ibn al-Khatib, at Cervera Kayaddayr al-Dammari al-Abra (the Leper), a prince of the north African tribe of the Banu Dammari, decapitated one of the counts of the Banu Gómez and carried his head about with him. García's three brothers, Velasco, Sancho, and Munio, also bore the title count, but only Velasco does not appear in any sources after 1000 and can therefore be identified as the one killed at Cervera. The only narrative Christian sources to mention the battle, both closely related to the Muslims histories, differ from them in stressing the leadership of García Gómez. The Anales Castellanos Segundos record that In era MXXXVIII [año 1000] fuit arrancada de Cervera super conde Sancium Garcia et Garcia Gomez: "In the Era 1038 [AD 1000] was the defeat of Cervera over count Sancho García and García Gómez." According to the Anales Toledanos Primeros, in Era MCCCVIII fue la arranda [arrancada] de Cervera sobre el conde don Sancho García e García Gómez: "Era 1308 [sic] was the defeat of Cervera over the count don Sancho García and García Gómez."

Recently, Margarita Torres Sevilla has proposed identifying García Gómez with the "Ibn Mama Duna" or "Ibn Mumadumna al-Qumis" (son/descendant of Muniadomna, the Count) who in 1009 entered Córdoba and installed as caliph one Sulayman ibn Hakam, the candidate of the Berbers. The evidence is, however, very weak and the Christian count who entered Córdoba that year was Sancho García of Castile.

After the Almanzor's death (1002), García was one of the barons of the realm who signed the peace treaty with the former's son, al-Muzzaffar. In 1005 he added Cea and Grajal to his domains and in 1007 Ceión. García rebelled again in 1007, when he used the title Count of León.

== Sources ==
- Martínez Díez, Gonzalo. 2005. El condado de Castilla, 711–1038: La historia frente a la leyenda. Marcial Pons Historia.
