= Jimena Muñoz =

12th-century Leonese noblewoman

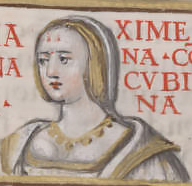
Non-contemporary portrayal of Jimena Muñoz from the 16th-century Liber genealogiae regum Hispanie

Jimena Muñoz or Muñiz (died 1128) was a noblewoman from the El Bierzo region of the medieval Kingdom of León, and the mistress of king Alfonso VI of León and Castile during the late 1070s and early 1080s. By him she was mother of two countesses and grandmother of Afonso I, first king of Portugal.

== Biography ==
Jimena's origin has been subject to scholarly discussion and debate. Her patronymic indicates that her father was named Munio, and a contemporary chronicler, Bishop Pelagius of Oviedo, called her nobilisima (very noble), while the Crónicas anónimas de Sahagún describes her similarly, muy noble. The 17th-century historian Luis Alfonso de Carvallo made her sister of Galician count Rodrigo Muñoz and daughter of count Munio Rodríguez by his wife Jimena Ordóñez, granddaughter of king Bermudo II of León. In this he was followed the next century by church historian Enrique Flórez, but both the chronology and the politics would seem to militate against this placement. She would appear to be the woman of this name in charters of the monastery of San Pedro de Montes along with a Munio Muñoz and his wife Velasquita. With Munio appearing to be too old to have been her brother, historian Quintana Prieto suggested that these were Jimena's parents. He likewise suggests that Munio was the count of this name who accompanied Alfonso to Seville. Other historians have accepted this relationship, and, further, have made Munio Muñoz a son of Munio Rodríguez and Jimena Ordóñez, by which connection Jimena would be a descendant of Bermudo II.

On the other hand, Canal Sánchez Pagín called attention to a Jimena Muñoz, who was sister of Asturian count Rodrigo Muñoz, of Urraca Muñoz, wife of count Gómez González, and of Enderquina Muñoz, wife of count Fernando Díaz, all children of nobilisimi comitis Monio Gonçaluizi (very noble count Munio González). He concluded that, among the possible solutions to the parentage of Jimena, it was most likely she was identical to the daughter of this count Munio González and his wife Mayor. In this he was followed by genealogist Szabolcs de Vajay and historian Jaime de Salazar y Acha, who further showed that a count Munio Rodríguez (distinct from the husband of Jimena Ordóñez) had two daughters by his wife Jimena Muñoz: Velasquita and Mayor Muñoz, and he also showed that the wife of Munio Muñoz was named Velasquita Muñoz. He concluded that the king's lover, Jimena, was daughter of Munio González and this Mayor Muñoz, making her niece rather than daughter of Munio Muñoz and Velasquita Muñoz.

In his study of the bishops of Astorga, Quintana Prieto suggested that Jimena was a relative of bishop Pedro of Astorga, who was deprived of his seat in the early 1070s, and confined at the San Pedro del Montes monastery. The bishop's father was named Munio González. Jimeno would make donations both to the San Pedro monastery and to Astorga Cathedral, as well as to the Hospital de San Juan.

Jimena is thought to have formed a liaison with Alfonso in the period between his first and second marriages, and she appears to have retired from court not long after the birth of her younger daughter and Alfonso's marriage to Constance of Burgundy. He would name his former mistress his tenente (non-hereditary feudal administrator) over Castillo de Cornatel in El Bierzo, a role she occupied from 1093 to 1108. She died in 1128.

Alternative ancestries for Jimena Muñoz

Flórez reconstruction	Mello Vaz de São Paio reconstruction	Salazar y Acha reconstruction
Bermudo II of León	Bermudo II of León	Munio; Rodríguez; Canis
Ordóño; Vermúdez	Ordóño; Vermúdez	Munio; Muñoz
Gonzalo; Muñoz	Eilo; Muñoz
Munio; Rodríguez	Jimena; Ordóñez	Munio; Rodríguez	Jimena; Ordóñez	Munio; Rodríguez	Jimena; Muñoz
Rodrigo; Muñoz	Alfonso VI of León	Jimena; Muñoz	Rodrigo; Muñoz	Munio; Muñoz	Velasquita	Munio; González	Mayor; Muñoz	Munio; Muñoz	Velasquita; Muñoz
Alfonso VI of León	Jimena; Muñoz	Alfonso VI of León	Jimena; Muñoz	Rodrigo; Muñoz	Urraca; Muñoz	Gómez; González	Enderquina; Muñoz	Fernando; Díaz

== Burial ==
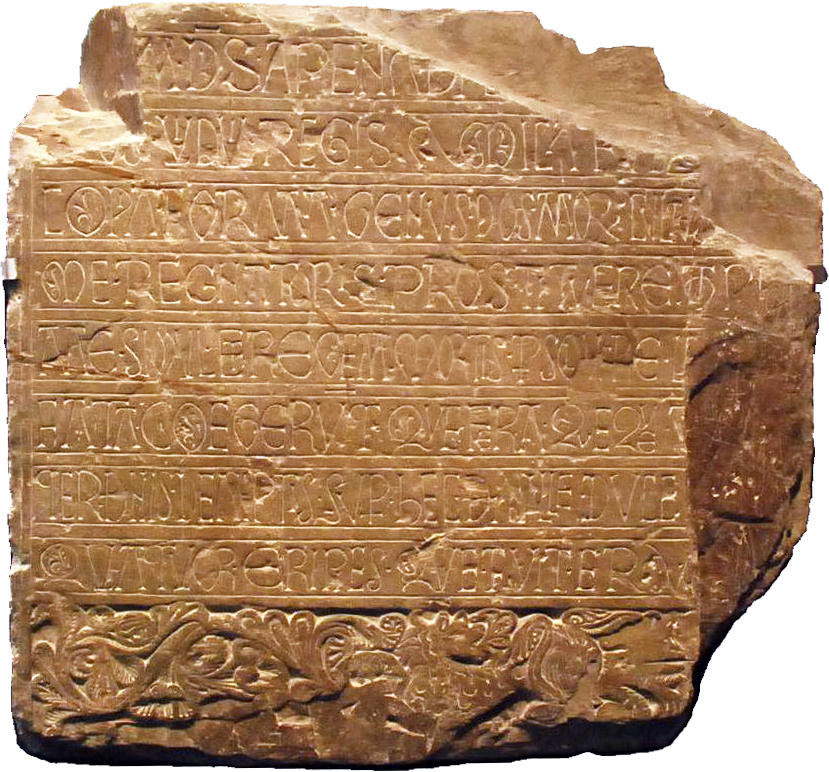
Epitaph of Jimena Muñoz: Quam deus a pena defendat dicta Semena Alphonsi vidui regis amica fui; Copia, forma, genus, dos morum, cultus amenus, Me regnatoris prostituere thoris, Me simul et Regem mortis persolvere legem. Fata coegerunt, que fera queque terunt Terdenis demptis super hec de mille ducentis, Quator eripies, que fuit era. Scies84.

Jimena would be interred in San Andrés monastery, Vega de Espinareda, in the El Bierzo region of León. Her grave, now lost, was once marked with an inscribed memorial stone that is now held by the Museo de León in that city.

== Issue ==
By her relationship with Alfonso, Jimena Muñoz was mother of two daughters, both of whom would marry prominent counts.

- Elvira Alfónsez (c. 1079 – aft. April 1157), who was married first to Raymond IV, Count of Toulouse and then to Count Fernando Fernández de Carrión.
- Teresa Alfónsez (c. 1080 – 11 November 1130), who married Henry, Count of Portugal; they received the right to rule the County of Portugal and their son, Afonso Henriques, became the first king of Portugal.

== Bibliography ==
- Canal Sánchez-Pagín, José Mª (1991). "Jimena Muñoz, amiga de Alfonso VI". Anuario de Estudios Medievales (21): 11–40. ISSN 0066-5061.
- Canal Sánchez-Pagín, José Mª (1979). "La infanta doña Elvira, hija de Alfonso VI y Gimena Muñoz, a la luz de los diplomas". Archivos Leoneses: Revista de estudios y documentación de los Reinos Hispano-Occidentales (66): 271–288. ISSN 0004-0630.
- Mello Vaz de São Payo, Luiz (2002). A Herança Genética de D. Afonso Henriques (in Portuguese). Oporto: Universidade Moderna do Porto. ISBN 84-7846-781-5.
- Quintana Prieto, Augusto (1969). "Jimena Muniz, madre de Doña Teresa de Portugal". Revista Portuguesa de História. 12 (12): 223–280. doi:10.14195/0870-4147_12_11. hdl:10316.2/46741. ISSN 0870-4147.
- Quintana Prieto, Augusto (1984). "La infanta Doña Elvira, hija de Alfonso I y de Jimena Muñiz". Temas Bercianos (3): 277–401. OCLC 13582389.
- Reilly, Bernard F. (1992). The Contest of Christian and Muslim Spain: 1031-1157. Cambridge, Mass.: Blackwell. ISBN 9780631199649.
- Rodríguez González, María del Carmen (2007). "Concubina o esposa. Reflexiones sobre la unión de Jimena Muñiz con Alfonso VI". Studia historica. Historia medieval (25): 143–168. ISSN 0213-2060.
- Salazar y Acha, Jaime de (1992–1993). "Contribución al estudio del reinado de Alfonso VI de Castilla: algunas aclaraciones sobre su política matrimonial". Anales de la Real Academia Matritense de Heráldica y Genealogía: 299–335. ISSN 1133-1240.
- Salazar y Acha, Jaime de (1989). "Los descendientes del conde Ero Fernández, fundador de Monasterio de Santa María de Ferreira de Pallares". El Museo de Pontevedra (43): 67–86. ISSN 0210-7791.
- Torres Sevilla-Quiñones de León, Margarita Cecilia (1999). Linajes nobiliarios de León y Castilla: Siglos IX-XIII. Salamanca: Junta de Castilla y León. ISBN 84-7846-781-5.
