= Fernando Fernández de Carrión =

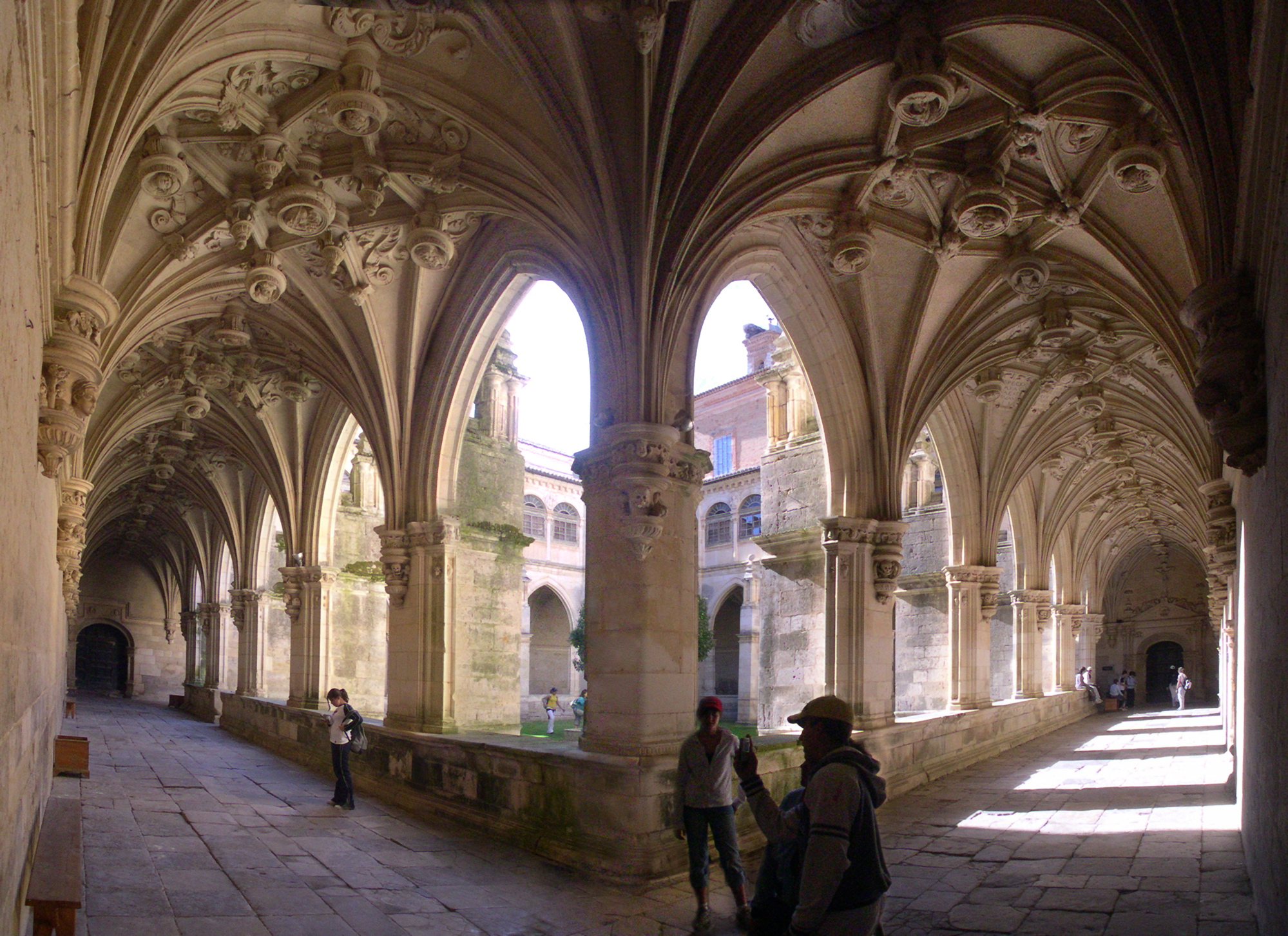
Courtyard of San Zoilo in Carrión de los Condes, where Fernando was buried and after which he is called "de Carrión".

Fernando Fernández or Fernán Fernándiz de Carrión (fl. 1107–1125) was a count in the Kingdom of León during the reign of Queen Urraca.

== Family and marriage ==
Fernando's origins are obscure. He probably hailed from the region of León, where he is known to have held properties and where he appears in some local documents. Though his patronymic indicates that his father was also named Fernando, his father has not been identified with certainty. He may have been related to Pedro Ansúrez. His parents have been tentatively identified as Fernando Méndez and Aldonza Gómez, daughter of Count Gómez Díaz de Carrión.

Fernando married into the royal family when he wed a certain Elvira Alfonso, a daughter of Alfonso VI. Alfonso had two daughters of this name and records are not explicit regarding which one was Fernando's wife. One Elvira was the daughter of a concubine, Jimena Muñoz, and the sister of Theresa of Portugal and had married count Raymond IV of Toulouse. Following his 1105 death, she either returned immediately to León, or she remained in Toulouse until after Urraca's death in 1126, which would have rendered her unavailable to marry Fernando. The other Elvira was a legitimate daughter, born to Queen Isabel, whom Alfonso wed in 1100. This Elvira married by 1120 to Roger II of Sicily, and had children by him through the mid-1130s. Since the wife of Fernando was still in Castile as late as 1133, most historians have concluded that she must have been the former Countess of Toulouse, the illegitimate daughter of Alfonso by Jimena.

Whichever Elvira was Fernando's wife, they had married by 8 July 1117, when together the couple made a private donation of the monastery of San Salvador de Ferreira to the abbey of Cluny. As this was in Galicia it probably represented a portion of his wife's inheritance. The marriage does not appear to have been a happy one. On 17 December 1120 Elvira sold the estate at Fuentes de los Oteros which she had received as arras (a bridal gift). The couple had separated by 1121, when Fernando married again, to Sancha González. His children by Elvira were Diego, García, and Teresa. Elvira was still living as late as 16 April 1157.

== Political role ==
Fernando was in the service of Henry, Count of Portugal, from 1108 until Henry's death in 1112. From 1111 he ruled Lamego. After Count Henry he no longer appears in Portuguese documents. Outside of Portugal at different times he held the tenencias of Salnellas (1113), Toro (1116–17), Bolaños (1117), and Tierra de Campos (1119). He held the tenencia of Malgrat (Malgrado), modern Benavente, from 1117 to 1124. The spurious acta of a synod supposed to have taken place in Oviedo in 1115 records the presence of Fernando, calling him ex campi Zamorae, et campi Tauri ("out of the field of Zamora and the field of Toro", that is, coming from those tenencias). A similar description of territories occurs in a document of 1117: in tauro et in camorus mandante ("in Toro and in Zamora commanding").

In 1121, when the royal court wintered in León, Fernando was in attendance. He had two documents drawn up by royal notaries Pedro Vicéntez and Juan Rodríguez, both dated to the joint reign of Urraca and her son, the future Alfonso VII. The following spring Urraca campaigned in Galicia, perhaps with Fernando accompanying. Fernando's death probably occurred towards the end of Urraca's reign, as he does not appear in any charters of Alfonso VII and the Chronica Adefonsi imperatoris does not list him among the nobles who did homage to the new king in 1126. His death can be dated no more precisely than between September 1125 and July 1129. He was buried in San Zoilo de Carrión and the inscription on his tomb was recorded by Prudencio de Sandoval:

PULVIS IN HAC FOSSA PARITER TUMULANTUR ET OSSA
CONSULIS ILLUSTRIS FERDIANDI MALGRATENSIS
("[There is] dust in this tomb and likewise are buried the bones /
of the illustrious consul Ferdinand of Malgrado")
