= Munio Peláez =

Galician magnate

Munio or Muño Peláez (floruit 1105–1142; died perhaps 1149) was a Galician magnate, a member of the Banu Gómez clan, during the reigns of Alfonso VI, Urraca and Alfonso VII. By December 1108 he held the title of comes (count), the highest in the kingdom. He was a son of count Pelayo Gómez, grandson of Gómez Díaz de Carrión and Teresa Peláez. His mother was Elvira Muñoz, half-sister of count Rodrigo Muñoz, and daughter of Munio Rodríguez and Ilduara Velázquez. Elvira's ancestors had founded the monastery of Santa María de Ferreira.

On 17 September 1111, Munio participated in the coronation of a young Alfonso VII in opposition to his mother, Urraca, at Santiago de Compostela. At the banquet following the coronation Munio acted as regalis offertorius, the official in charge of the food. Between May 1112 and November 1116 Munio governed the Galician tenencia of Monterroso, a region south of Lugo, west of the river Miño, and along the Way of Saint James. By the summer of 1114 he made peace with Queen Urraca, which keeps with the description of him provided by the Historia compostellana that he tried to steer a moderate course. He was still on Urraca's side in 1116. In the spring of 1120 Queen Urraca imprisoned Muño, probably for defecting to her son, and deprived him of all his lands, but by the next year he was restored and was supporting the queen against the Galician archbishop Diego Gelmírez. Munio was among those nobles forced in 1114 to swear an oath to "honour" Diego as part of the archbishop's reconciliation with the queen. Sometime in 1121 Munio built an "adulterine" (i.e., illegal) castle on the River Iso near Compostela. The Historia compostellana calls it a "den of robbers and bandits", and Diego managed to raze it to the ground soon after it was built. Munio was soon interceding on Diego's behalf with his brother-in-law Vermudo Pérez de Traba, whose castle at Faro Diego claimed.

Alfonso VII succeeded his mother in 1126. Throughout his tenure, Munio stayed an essentially Galician figure. He did not once attend court between 1127 and 1134, though he did attend in 1135 and was probably present at the imperial coronation of Alfonso in May. He joined the court on its tours of Galicia in 1137 and 1141, and once more, probably shortly before his death, in 1142, when the court was in Burgos. It has been speculated that physical infirmity may have played a role in keeping Munio in Galicia.

Munio was also a patron of the Galician church, making donations to Lugo Cathedral (1123), Santiago Cathedral and the regular clergy at Sar (1141). Though he is not mentioned in the Historia compostellana among those who paid homage to Alfonso VII upon his succession in 1126, it is known from documentary sources that he was in Zamora on 13 April when Alfonso was there to receive the homage of the Galician aristocracy.

Munio married Lupa Pérez, daughter of Pedro Fróilaz de Traba and Urraca Fróilaz. They were married by 30 October 1130. In December 1147, possibly after Muño's death, Lupa, calling herself Deo devota (devoted to God), made a donation to the Cistercian monks of Monfero Abbey on the condition that they would say a mass for her soul and her husband's annually on 30 September, the day after Michaelmas. She had previously patronised Monfero in July 1137 and would again in August 1150. In April that year she had purchased a piece of land at San Cristóbal de Dormeá, where, on 1 October 1152, she founded a monastery. When the new monastery received a royal privilege from Ferdinand II on 8 November 1157, Lupa was still living. Her children by Munio were Aldonza, Elvira, Fernando, Pedro and Teresa.
