= Morilla =

Morilla is an alternative scientific name for the fungus, Morchella. Morilla may also refer to:

== In people ==
Given name

- Morilla M. Norton (1865-1916), American author

Surname

- Antonio Hidalgo Morilla (born 1979), Spanish former footballer
- Jennifer Morilla (born 1989), Spanish footballer
- Jose Antonio Romero Morilla (born 1980), Spanish football manager
- José Jesús Lanza Morilla (born 1978), Spanish footballer
- Pedro Morilla (born 1972), Spanish professional football manager and former player
- Pelayo Morilla (born 2001), Spanish footballer

== In other ==
- Morilla de los Oteros, Spanish hamlet in Pajares de los Oteros, León province, Castile and León
