= Pobladura de los Oteros =

- Minor local entity
- Location within Province of León Location within Castile and León Location within Spain
- Coordinates: 42°21′13″N 5°28′26″W
- Country: Spain
- Autonomous community: Castile and León
- Province: Province of León
- Municipality: Pajares de los Oteros
- Elevation: 795 m (2,608 ft)

Population
  - Total: 10

Pobladura de los Oteros is a hamlet and minor local entity located in the municipality of Pajares de los Oteros, in the province of León, Castile and León, Spain. As of 2020, it has a population of 10.

== Geography ==
Pobladura de los Oteros is located 35km south-southeast of León, Spain.
