= Elvira of Castile, Countess of Toulouse =

French noblewoman (before 1082-died 1151)

- Born: before 1082
- Died: 1151
- Spouse: Raymond IV, Count of Toulouse (m. 1094; died 1105) Fernando Fernández de Carrión (m. 1117)
- Issue: Alfonso Jordan; Diego Fernández; García Fernández; Teresa Fernández
- Father: Alfonso VI of León and Castile
- Mother: Jimena Muñoz

Elvira of Castile (before 1082?–1151) was a countess consort of Toulouse.

== Early life ==
She was the illegitimate daughter of Alfonso VI of León and Castile, by his mistress Jimena Muñoz, and full sister of Theresa, Countess of Portugal.

== Marriages and children ==
She married, firstly, Raymond IV, Count of Toulouse in 1094, being mother of count Alfonso Jordan.

Elvira accompanied Raymond on the First Crusade in 1096, and was present at the siege of Tripoli, where she gave birth to their son. It appears that the couple separated before the death of Raymond.

Elvira returned to Castile. Her son became the monarch of Tripoli upon the death of Raymond in 1105, but Elvira is not mentioned as present in Tripoli. In Castile, before 1117, she married Count Fernando Fernández de Carrión, having three additional children: Diego, García and Teresa Fernández, who was a wife of Count Osorio Martínez.
