= Quintanilla de os Oteros =

- Minor local entity
- Quintanilla de los Oteros
- Location within Province of León Location within Castile and León Location within Spain
- Coordinates: 42°18′38″N 5°25′41″W
- Country: Spain
- Autonomous community: Castile and León
- Province: Province of León
- Municipality: Pajares de los Oteros
- Elevation: 848 m (2,782 ft)

Population
  - Total: 13

Quintanilla de os Oteros or Quintanilla de los Oteros is a hamlet and minor local entity located in the municipality of Pajares de los Oteros, in the province of León, Castile and León, Spain. As of 2020, it has a population of 13.

== Geography ==
Quintanilla de os Oteros is located 49km south-southeast of León, Spain.
