= Battle of Cervera =

10th-century battle in Islamic Iberia

- Part of the Reconquista
Date	29 July 1000
Location	Near Espinosa de Cervera, County of Castile, Kingdom of León (present-day Province of Burgos, Castile and León, Spain) 41°54′N 3°28′W
Result	Córdoban victory

Belligerents
Kingdom of León; County of Castile; Kingdom of Pamplona	Caliphate of Córdoba

Commanders and leaders
Sancho García; García Gómez	Almanzor

Strength
Unknown	Unknown; described by Muslim sources as an exceptionally large, incalculable force.

Casualties and losses
Heavy	+700

The Battle of Cervera took place near Espinosa de Cervera on 29 July 1000 between the Christian troops of counts Sancho García of Castile and García Gómez of Saldaña and the Muslim Caliphate of Córdoba under the hajib Almanzor. The battle, "tremendous and difficult to describe", was a victory for Almanzor. The battle is listed as the fifty-second of Almanzor's career in the Dikr bilad al-Andalus.

== Causes and preparations ==
A truce between Castile and Córdoba had existed since the succession of Sancho García, but in 999 it was broken when the count refused to pay the annual tribute and came to the aid of his Christian neighbour, García Sánchez II of Pamplona, when Almanzor attacked him. On 21 June 1000 an army left Córdoba under Almanzor for a punitive expedition against Castile. The subsequent campaign is the most well-recorded of Almanzor's many wars after his Compostela campaign of 997. The primary historian is Ibn al-Khatib, who derived his Arabic account partially from Ibn Hayyan, himself relying on the eye-witness testimony of his father, Jalaf ibn Husayn ibn Hayyan, one of the combatants on the Muslim side and a secretary to Almanzor. Ibn al-Khatib records that the campaign was the most intense and difficult Almanzor ever waged, that preparations took an especially long time, and that all the rulers of Christian Spain were allied against him, with troops from all the Christian realms assembled together.

Almanzor crossed the Duero and invaded Castile near Madinat Selim, where he sighted an army under Sancho García and the "Galician kings", consisting of troops from as far as Pamplona and Astorga. Almanzor passed by the fortresses of Osma, San Esteban de Gormaz, and Clunia, which had been in Muslim hands for several years at that point. Just north of Clunia he was surprised to find a large Christian army. Sancho, who had been elected leader of the entire army by the assembled troops, was encamped at the rock of Yarbayra (Peña de Cervera), a central location, well situated for supplies, and inaccessible due to its geography. The implication of these events is that Sancho's planning and communications had been superior to those of Almanzor. The roads from Clunia, the northernmost Muslims garrison, led to Tordómar, Lara, and Salas de los Infantes through the narrow pass of the Yecla, which passed through the Peña de Cervera before widening into the basin of the river Arlanza.

== Evolution of the battle ==
The dispersed would have continued not having the means of the protection of God, the ponderous perseverance of Almanzor and the magnificent firmness with which he himself worked, notwithstanding the greatness of his alarm and his private confusion before the development of events. Such a state was reflected in the imploring attitude of his hands, in his death-like moans, and in the vehemence with which he repeated the Koranic ejaculations of the return to God. The luck changed, then, because God helped the Muslims with his [direct] aid and with men who knew how to resist . . .

According to Ibn al-Khatib, the Christians solemnly swore an oath not to retreat from battle. Almanzor was aware of his disadvantaged position—the Christians had a stronger camp and better sightlines, with a large open field before them—but his viziers could not agree on how to proceed. Then, without planning and without strategy, the Christian host descended on the unsuspecting Muslims and the battle soon evolved into a general mêlée. Almanzor's right and left columns were attacked simultaneously and soon fell back, which inspired the Christians to press their advantage even more boldly. The majority of the Muslim rear, disoriented by the unorganised attack and disheartened by the result, fled.

According to the eyewitness Jalaf ibn Husayn, Almanzor, with his escort, observed the action from atop a short hill near the field. While he was debating whether to throw his retinue into the fight the right wing broke, which furthered the confusion. One of Almanzor's secretaries, Abd al-Malik ibn Idris al-Yaziri, said to Said Ibn Yusuf, as reported by Ibn al-Qalina, "Come to say goodbye, O martyr, because surely today you must die." By the end of the day, Said Ibn Yusuf was dead.

Jalaf also related how, when Almanzor asked him how many of his own retinue remained, Jalaf counted them off for him one by one and arrived at twenty. Almanzor eventually dismounted and returned to his couch in order to strengthen the confidence of those around him. It was there that Jalaf says he hit upon the idea of transferring the camp from the shallow depression in which he had first pitched it to the hill from which he had been observing the battle. The sight of the large tent of Almanzor now propped on the hill demoralised the Christians and inspired the Muslims. In their ten-mile flight many Christians were captured and many more killed, while more than 700 Muslims died that day. The Christian camp was captured and pillaged.

Ibn al-Khatib notes that the most outstanding fighter on the Muslim side was Abd al-Malik, Almanzor's son, stressing that this was "by unanimous opinion" without any favoritism and that he excelled even the famous Berber cavalry. Among these, Kayaddayr al-Dammari al-Abra (the Leper), a prince of the north African tribe of the Banu Dammari, was most famous. At Cervera he reputedly decapitated one of the counts of the Banu Gómez and carried his head about with him. Ibn al-Khatib also praises Almanzor's second son by another woman, Abd al-Rahman, who followed his half-brother into battle. Both brothers watched the battle with their father until he finally permitted them, tearfully, to join it.

== Christian and Muslim reactions ==
Map showing the major campaigns of Almanzor, indicating that Burgos was attacked in 1000 following the outcome at Cervera, an error based on a misinterpretation of an Arabic source.

Though the battle was a Muslim victory, the Christians did succeed in preventing further inroads by Almanzor in Castile. Gonzalo Martínez Díez speculates that if the Christians had not met Almanzor at Cervera, the hajib would have gone on to devastate Burgos as he had already Barcelona, Pamplona, León, and Santiago de Compostela. In fact Almanzor's attention was drawn away from Castile and towards Pamplona. On 4 September he took a certain place, Kashtila, best identified with Carcastillo, on the road from Zaragoza to Pamplona, just inside the Pamplonese kingdom. He returned to Córdoba on 7 October after an absence of 109 days, probably the longest of his 56 razzias he waged during his life. Dissatisfied with the conduct of his troops at Cervera, at Córdoba the great general harangued them for cowardice. The poet Ibn Darraj, who was present at Cervera, was also displeased with the result. His poem 105 is a bitter recollection of the campaign, including a reference to the brief invasion of Pamplona and the burning of the monastery of Santa Cruz de la Serós. The poet's other reference to Almanzor's punishment of al-hima min al-rah, identified with La Rioja (then the Kingdom of Viguera), indicates that Almanzor's campaign was directed primarily against Pamplona—where he apparently campaigned for seventy days—and García Sánchez.

The only narrative Christian sources to mention the battle are the Anales Castellanos Segundos and the Anales Toledanos Primeros, both closely related to the Muslims histories. The first records that In era MXXXVIII [año 1000] fuit arrancada de Cervera super conde Sancium Garcia et Garcia Gomez: "In the Era 1038 [AD 1000] was the defeat of Cervera over count Sancho García and García Gómez." According to the second, in Era MCCCVIII fue la arranda [arrancada] de Cervera sobre el conde don Sancho García e García Gómez: "Era 1308 [sic] was the defeat of Cervera over the count don Sancho García and García Gómez." What the Christian annals have in common that the Arabic sources do not share is the stressing of the leadership of García Gómez of the Banu Gumis clan, one of whose comital members is recorded as killed in battle and beheaded by Ibn al-Khatib. García's three brothers, Velasco, Sancho, and Munio, also bore the title count, but only Velasco does not appear in any sources after 1000 and can therefore be identified as the one killed at Cervera.

There is a document from c. 1030 in the cartulary of San Juan de la Peña, edited by Antonio Ubieto Arteta, that reads:

De Torre de Gisando. Domno Gisando et don Kintla et don Gutierre et don Monnio fuerunt bassallos de illo comite Garcia Fernandiz, et matarunt illos mauros in Zeruera et fuerunt manneros. ("From Torreguisando. Don Guisando and Don Quíntila and Don Gutierre and Don Monio were vassals of that count García Fernández, and they killed Moors in Cervera and were without descendants.")

== General and cited references ==
- Martínez Díez, Gonzalo (2005). El condado de Castilla, 711–1038: La historia frente a la leyenda.
