= Valdesaz de los Oteros =

- Minor local entity
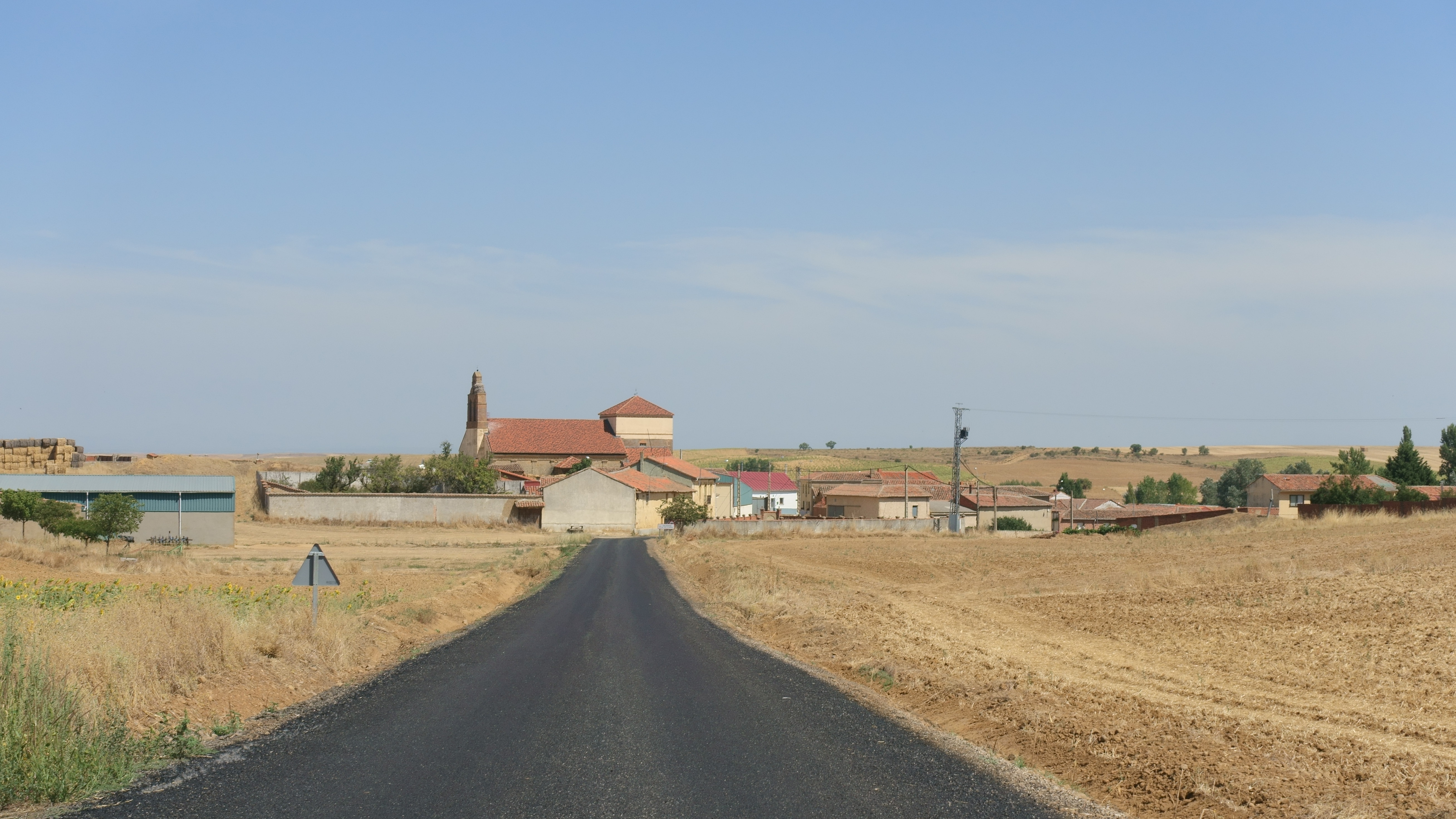

- Location within Province of León Location within Castile and León Location within Spain
- Coordinates: 42°19′25″N 5°25′34″W
- Country: Spain
- Autonomous community: Castile and León
- Province: Province of León
- Municipality: Pajares de los Oteros
- Elevation: 823 m (2,700 ft)

Population
  - Total: 37

Valdesaz de los Oteros is a hamlet and minor local entity located in the municipality of Pajares de los Oteros, in the province of León, Castile and León, Spain. As of 2020, it has a population of 37.

== Geography ==
Valdesaz de los Oteros is located 50km south-southeast of León, Spain.
