= Pajares de los Oteros =

- municipality
- Coat of arms

- Location within Castile and León Location within Spain
- Coordinates: 42°20′N 5°28′W
- Country: Spain
- Autonomous community: Castile and León
- Province: León
- Municipality: Pajares de los Oteros

Area
  - Total: 61 km^{2} (24 sq mi)

Population (2025-01-01)
  - Total: 245
  - Density: 4.0/km^{2} (10/sq mi)
- Time zone: UTC+1 (CET)
  - Summer (DST): UTC+2 (CEST)

Pajares de los Oteros (Payares de los Outeiros in Leonese language) is a municipality located in the province of León, Castile and León, Spain. According to the 2025 census (INE), the municipality has a population of 245 inhabitants.

== Tradition ==
There is a local popular aphorism that says:

El vino de Pajares quita pesares	Wine from Pajares takes away sorrows

== Villages ==
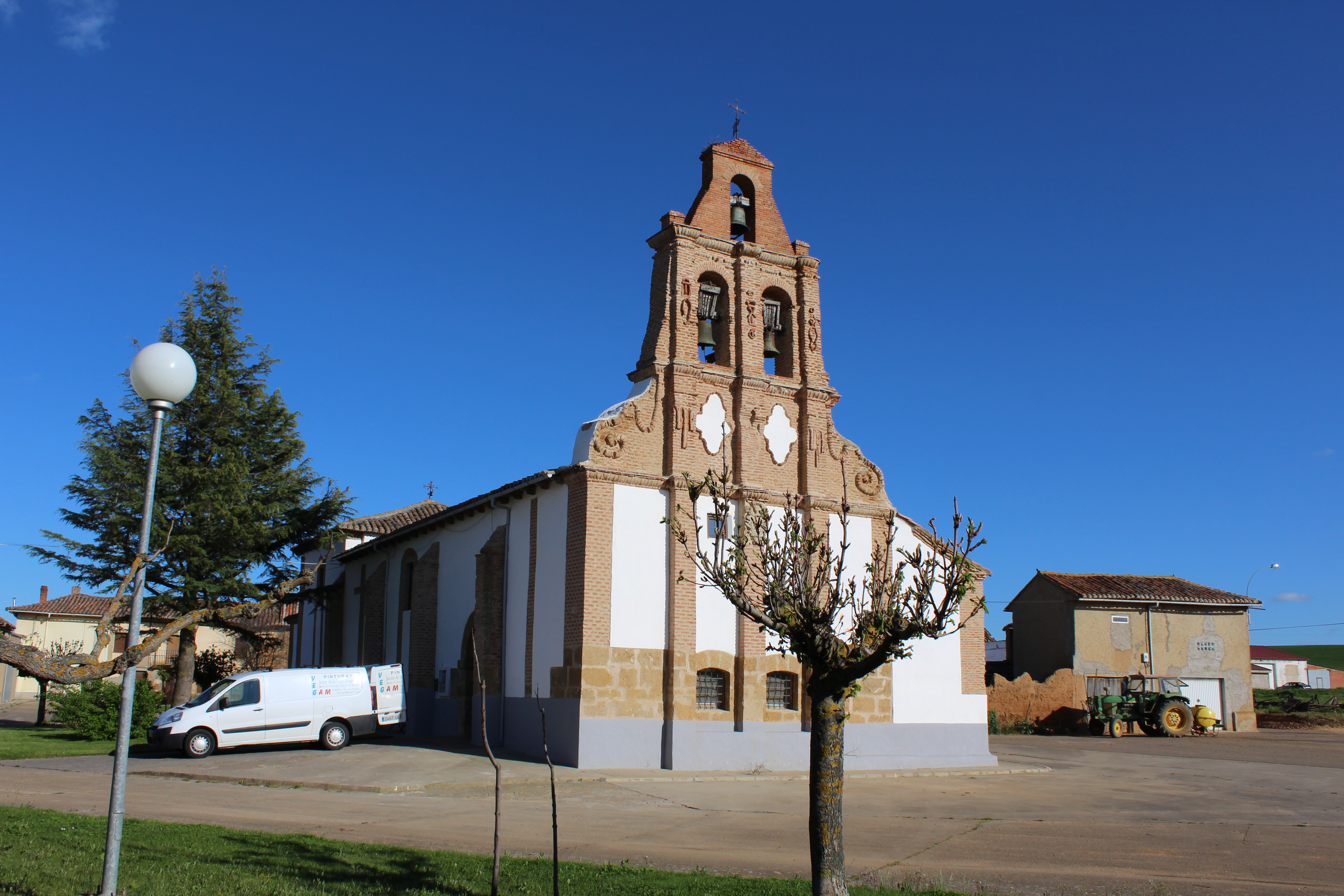
Parish Church of Pajares de los Oteros

- Pajares de los Oteros main town
- Fuentes de los Oteros
- Morilla de los Oteros
- Pobladura de los Oteros
- Quintanilla de os Oteros
- Valdesaz de los Oteros
- Velilla de los Oteros
