= Melgar de Arriba =

Coordinates: 42°16′N 5°06′W

Melgar de Arriba, Spain
- Coat of arms

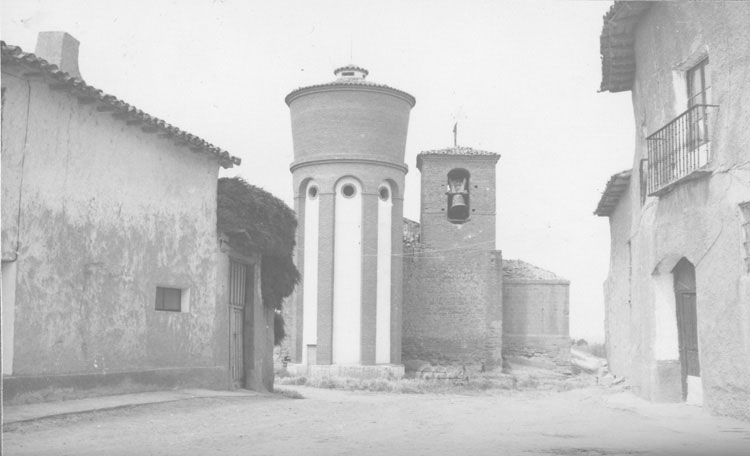
- main square, old picture
- Country: Spain
- Autonomous community: Castile and León
- Province: Valladolid
- Municipality: Melgar de Arriba

Area
  - Total: 35 km^{2} (14 sq mi)

Population (2025-01-01)
  - Total: 161
  - Density: 4.6/km^{2} (12/sq mi)
- Time zone: UTC+1 (CET)
  - Summer (DST): UTC+2 (CEST)

Melgar de Arriba is a municipality located in the province of Valladolid, Castile and León, Spain. According to the 2004 census (INE), the municipality has a population of 271 inhabitants.
