= Bernardo del Carpio =

Medieval Spanish hero

Bernardo del Carpio (also spelled Bernaldo del Carpio) is a legendary hero of the medieval Spain. Until the end of the nineteenth century and the labors of Ramón Menéndez Pidal, he, not El Cid, was considered to have been the chief hero of medieval Christian Spain and was believed to be a historical person. His factual existence has been defended in the later 20th century, although the Spanish government has not designated him to be historical.

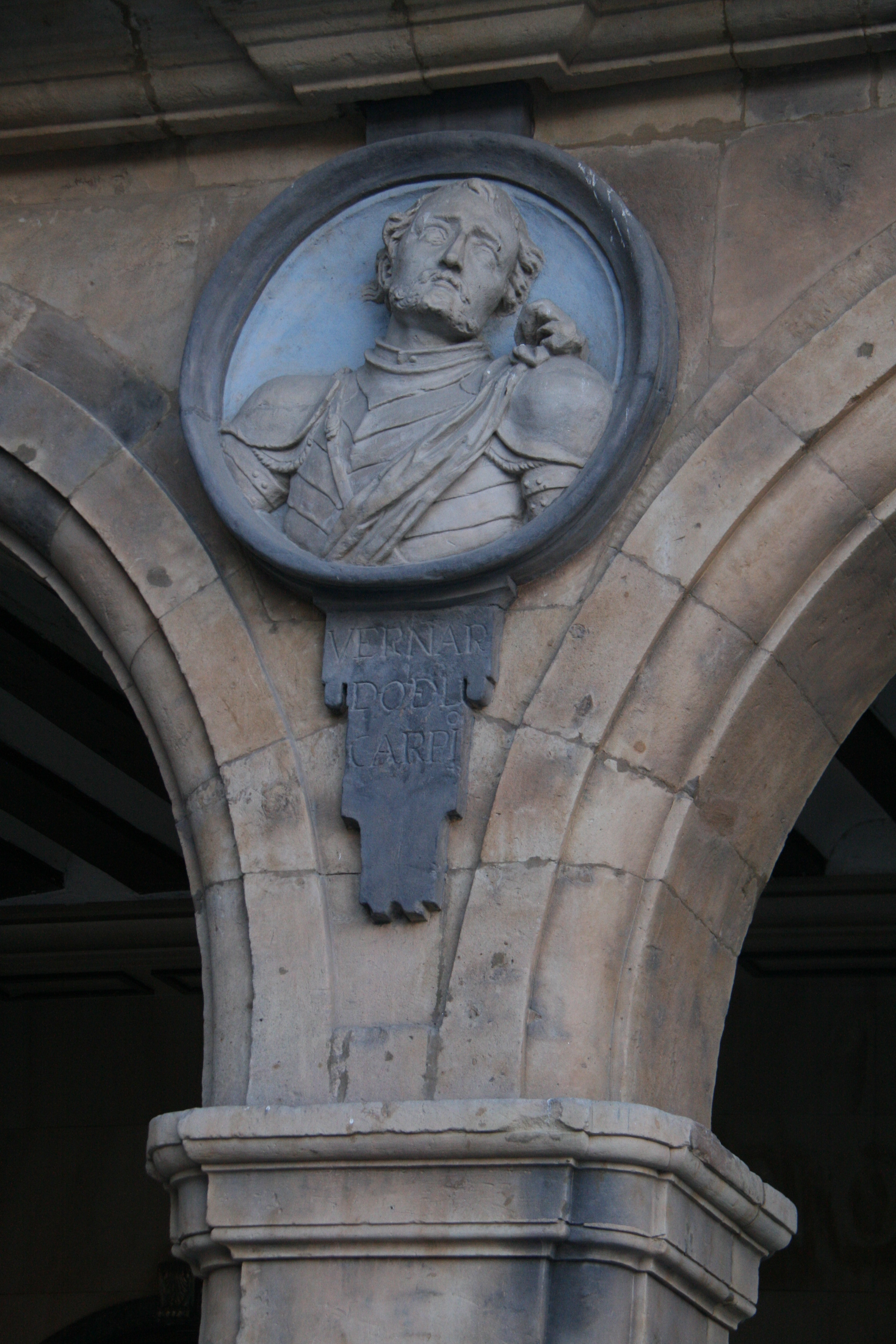
Bernardo del Carpio

== The story ==
The earliest form of the legend of Bernardo is found in the Chronicon mundi of Lucas of Tuy (1236), followed closely by the Historia Gothica of Rodrigo Jiménez de Rada (1243) and the Primera Crónica General (1270).

According to the form of the legend found in the 13th-century chronicles, Bernardo was the son of the secret marriage of Sancho Díaz, count of Saldaña, and Jimena, daughter of King Alfonso II of Asturias (r. 791–835), although rumour had it that his mother was Timbor, sister of the Frankish king Charlemagne. He was born early in his grandfather Alfonso's reign, but when the king learned of the illicit marriage he had Sancho imprisoned and Jimena placed in a convent. Bernardo was raised in the royal court.

When Alfonso grew old, he submitted to Charlemagne in return for protection against the Moors. Bernardo led the resistance to this submission, forcing Alfonso to renege. Charlemagne then invaded Asturias. Bernardo, leading the army, and his Moorish ally, King Marsil of Zaragoza, defeated the Franks at the Battle of Roncevaux Pass, where Roland was killed.

After his victory, Bernardo learned that his father was still alive. He went into mourning for his living father, but Alfonso still refused to free Sancho. When Charlemagne returned to take revenge on Marsil, Bernardo joined him against his old ally. Charlemagne richly rewarded him and brought him back to France. Twenty-four years later he returned to Asturias and fought alongside King Alfonso III at Toledo.

When his cousin, Don Bueso, marched from France with an army, Bernardo defeated him in a duel and then defeated his army. He then demanded the freedom of his father, but was refused. A year later, he fought for the queen in a tournament, but his request for his father's freedom was again refused. He then decided to go on a rampage, seizing land and generally terrorizing the kingdom for two years. He built up a large retinue and constructed a castle he called El Carpio near Salamanca as his headquarters. When Alfonso III marched on El Carpio, Bernardo demanded his father's release. This was granted, but his father had died three days before. Bernardo thus lost the castle for nothing.

Bernardo returned to France for a time before Charlemagne sent him back with soldiers and horses to fight the Moors. He liberated Berbegal, Barbastro and Sobrarbe before settling down to marry Doña Galinda, daughter of Count Alardos de Latre. He repopulated the Canal de Jaca.

== Origins ==
Although presented in the chronicles as history, the story of Bernardo is fictitious, being full of anachronisms and chronologically impossible. He would have been 82 years old when he defeated Don Bueso and his father must have been 110 at his death. The Primera Crónica frequently expresses doubt about the story. The historical figure who is most likely the origin of the legend is Bernard of Septimania.

== Literary works about Bernardo del Carpio ==
The original legend of Bernardo del Carpio was sung by the jongleurs (minstrels, professional reciters, entertainers) of the Kingdom of León. Later, the Castilian poet Pero Ferrús (fl. 1380) mentions Bernardo del Carpio in one of his cantigas, which combines the theme of the good life in Castile with a series of loores, or lyric paeans, to a series of Greek, Roman, Biblical, chivalric, and Arab heroes.

In 1624 Bernardo de Balbuena published El Bernardo, an epic poem recounting Bernardo's exploits.

In the opening of Don Quixote, Miguel de Cervantes has the protagonist especially admiring Bernardo because he crushed Roland with his arms alone, although the context is clear that Quixote is placing too much credence in the fantastic stories of romance.

Cervantes referred to one of his works as "the Bernardo". This uncompleted work is lost, as are almost all of Cervantes's manuscripts. Daniel Eisenberg has proposed that in Cervantes's Spain a book about a " Bernardo" must have been about Bernardo del Carpio. In contrast with Roland/Orlando, Bernardo was a Spanish hero, a national hero, and Cervantes was much in favor of celebrating Spanish heroes, or celebrating them more.
