= Cervera de los Montes =

- municipality
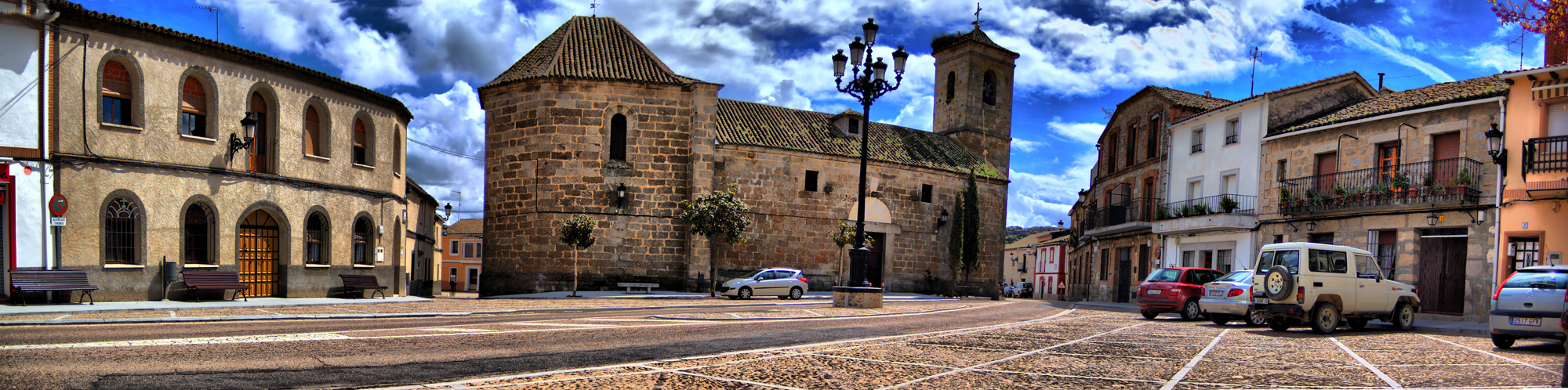

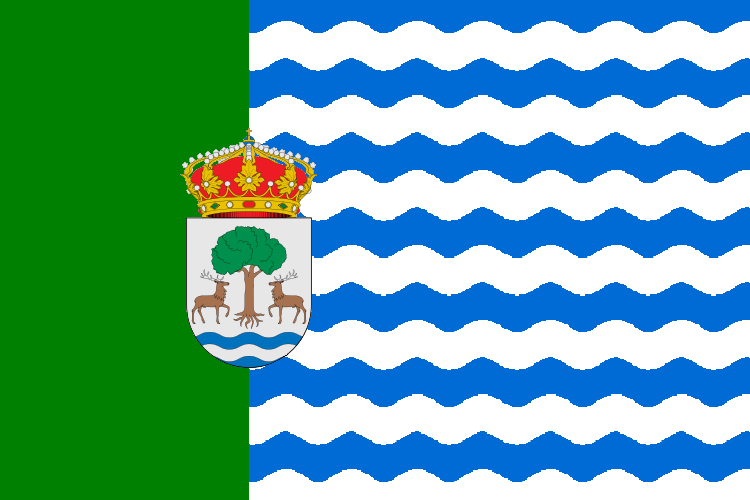
- Flag Coat of arms

- Location in Spain
- Coordinates: 40°3′N 4°48′W
- Country: Spain
- Autonomous community: Castile-La Mancha
- Province: Toledo

Area
  - Total: 32 km^{2} (12 sq mi)
- Elevation: 533 m (1,749 ft)

Population (2025-01-01)
  - Total: 513
  - Density: 16/km^{2} (42/sq mi)
- Time zone: UTC+1 (CET)
  - Summer (DST): UTC+2 (CEST)

Cervera de los Montes is a municipality located in the province of Toledo, Castile-La Mancha, Spain. According to the 2006 census, the municipality has a population of 329 inhabitants.

== Demographics ==
Historical population
Year	Pop.	±%
1900	771	—
1910	852	+10.5%
1920	821	−3.6%
1930	892	+8.6%
1940	783	−12.2%
1950	817	+4.3%
1960	784	−4.0%
1970	634	−19.1%
1981	501	−21.0%
1991	437	−12.8%
2001	386	−11.7%
2011	448	+16.1%
2021	504	+12.5%
2023	500	−0.8%
Source: INE
