= Saldaña, Palencia =

Coordinates: 42°31′N 4°44′W

Saldaña
- municipality
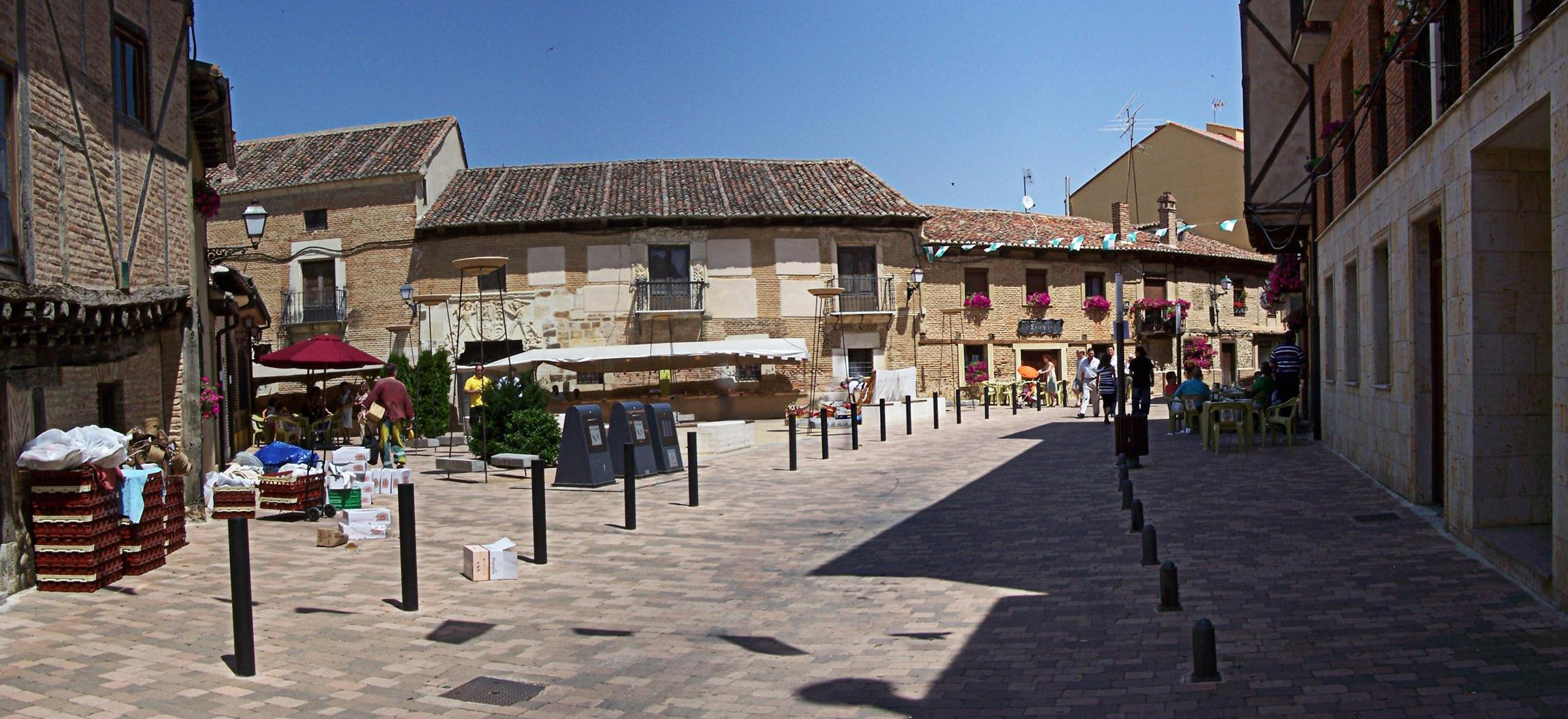

- Flag Coat of arms
- Interactive map of Saldaña
- Country: Spain
- Autonomous community: Castile and León
- Province: Palencia
- Municipality: Saldaña

Area
  - Total: 131.95 km^{2} (50.95 sq mi)

Population (2025-01-01)
  - Total: 2,844
  - Density: 21.55/km^{2} (55.82/sq mi)
- Time zone: UTC+1 (CET)
  - Summer (DST): UTC+2 (CEST)
- Website: Official website

Saldaña is a town and municipality in the province of Palencia in the autonomous community of Castile and León, Spain, and may be the town of "Eldana" mentioned by the historian Ptolemy as being conquered by the Roman Empire.

Geographically, the town is situated on the banks of the River Carrión.

The town's connection to the Roman Era is reflected in the beautiful remains of a villa attributed to the emperor Theodosius I.

From the 10th to the 11th century, Saldaña was the seat of a family of powerful counts, the Banu Gómez. The medieval counts of Saldaña figure in local history and literature. Anachronistically, they appear in tales related to the exploits of the semi-legendary figure Bernardo del Carpio, while their legendary scions, the Infantes de Carrión, prove rivals of the hero in the Cantar de Mio Cid.

It was here in 1149 that Berenguela of Barcelona died.

Saldaña is also known for its popular open-air market day held each Tuesday in the town's central plaza.

Its old stone-surfaced town square, known as the "Plaza Vieja," is believed to date to the 10th century. Work started in September, 2019 to reconstruct the plaza's pavement to make it safer for pedestrians and more easily accessible to persons with disabilities.

== Gallery ==
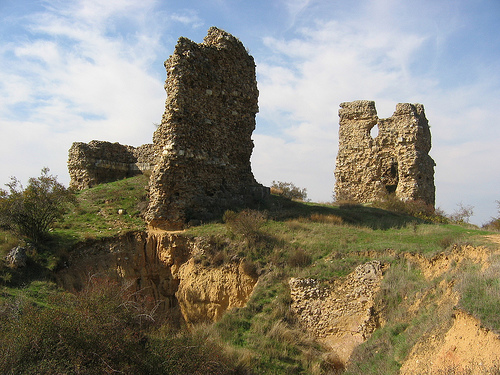
Ruins of the castle at Saldaña

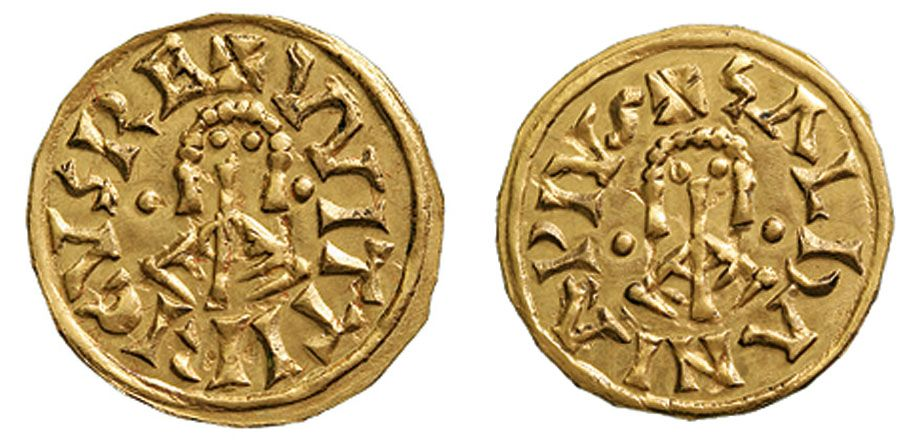
Visigothic coin of the king Witteric minted in Saldaña

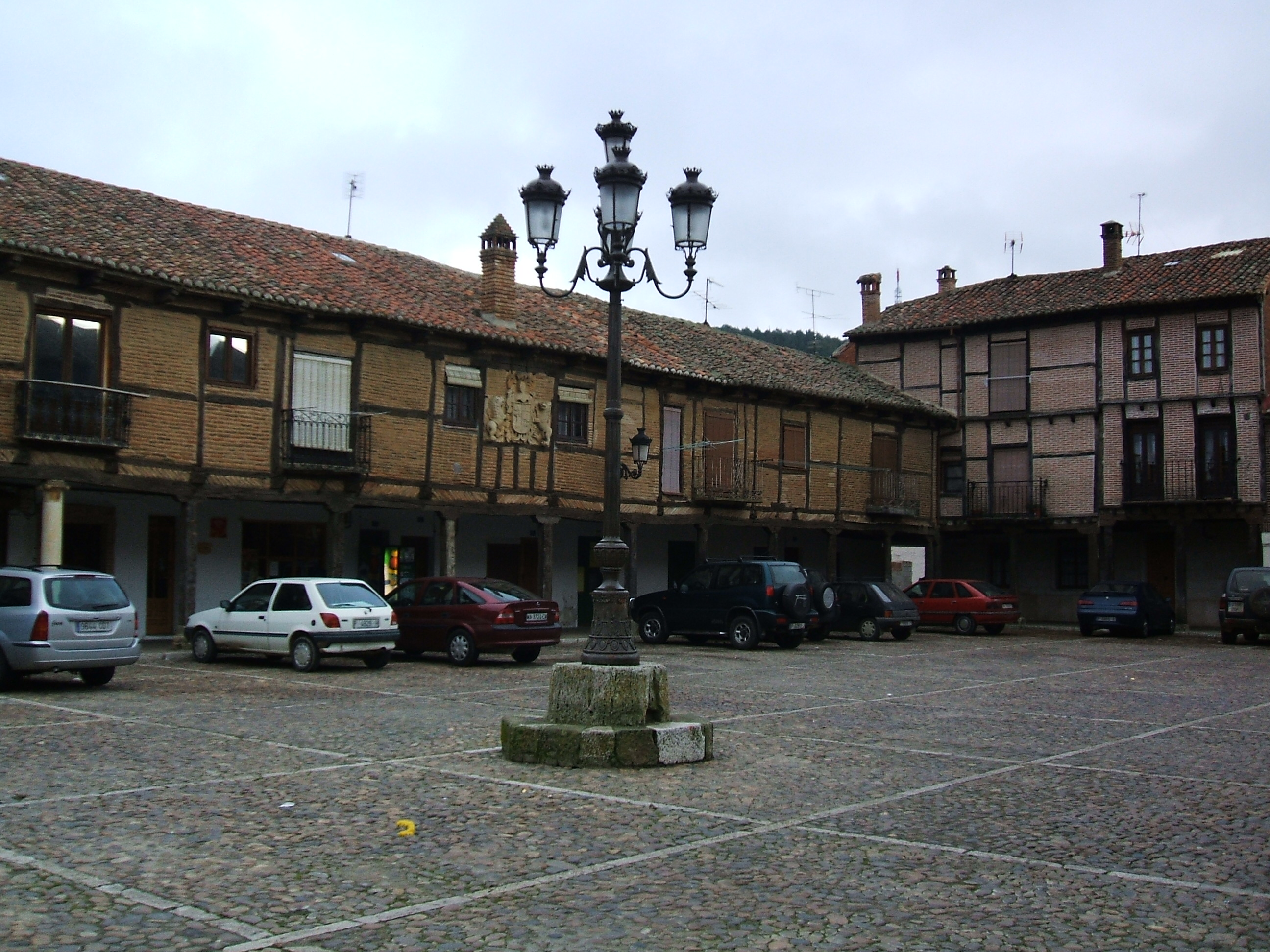
Cars parked in Saldaña's old town square, the Plaza Vieja. Cars will be forbidden in the square after a renovation that began in September, 2019 is completed.
