= Cimanes de la Vega =

- Municipality
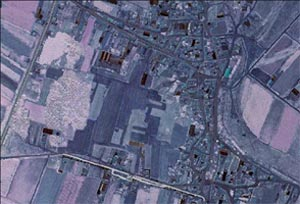
- Satellite view

- Flag Coat of arms

- Location within Spain
- Coordinates: 42°07′02″N 5°35′58″W
- Country: Spain
- Community: Castile and León
- Province: León
- Municipality: Cimanes de la Vega

Government
  - Mayor: Dionisio Zamora Ramos (PSOE)

Area
  - Total: 26.04 km^{2} (10.05 sq mi)
- Elevation: 720 m (2,360 ft)

Population (2025-01-01)
  - Total: 431
  - Density: 16.6/km^{2} (42.9/sq mi)
- Demonym(s): cimanés, cimanesa
- Time zone: UTC+1 (CET)
  - Summer (DST): UTC+2 (CEST)
- Postal Code: 24239
- Telephone prefix: 987
- Climate: Csb
- Website: Ayto. de Cimanes de la Vega

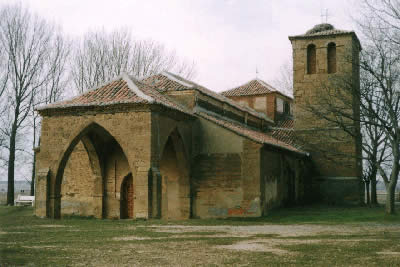
Virgen de la Vega

Cimanes de la Vega (Spanish pronunciation: [θiˈmanes ðe la ˈβeɣa]) is the most southerly municipality in the province of León, northern Spain. Located along the N-620 highway (León - Benavente), it is close to the Esla River.

It has around 570 inhabitants, grouped in three villages: Cimanes de la Vega, Bariones de la Vega and Lordemanos. Agriculture is the main activity. Irrigation is important as the land is dry. The main crops are beet (Beta vulgaris), maize (Zea mays) and cattle fodder.

Sights include the "Virgen de la Vega", an 11th-century hermitage.
