= Toranzo =

Toranzo is a surname. Notable people with the surname include:

- Borja Toranzo (1759–1847), Argentine philanthropist and patriot
- Fernando Toranzo Fernández (born 1950), Mexican politician
- Gustavo Toranzo (born 1987), Argentine footballer
- Nicasio Sánchez Toranzo (1905–2009), Argentine diplomat and politician
- Patricio Toranzo (born 1982), Argentine footballer
