= Santa María del Monte de Cea =

Coordinates: 42°29′N 5°07′W

Santa María del Monte de Cea, Spain
- Interactive map of Santa María del Monte de Cea, Spain
- Country: Spain
- Autonomous community: Castile and León
- Province: León
- Municipality: Santa María del Monte de Cea

Area
  - Total: 92 km^{2} (36 sq mi)

Population (2025-01-01)
  - Total: 207
  - Density: 2.2/km^{2} (5.8/sq mi)
- Time zone: UTC+1 (CET)
  - Summer (DST): UTC+2 (CEST)

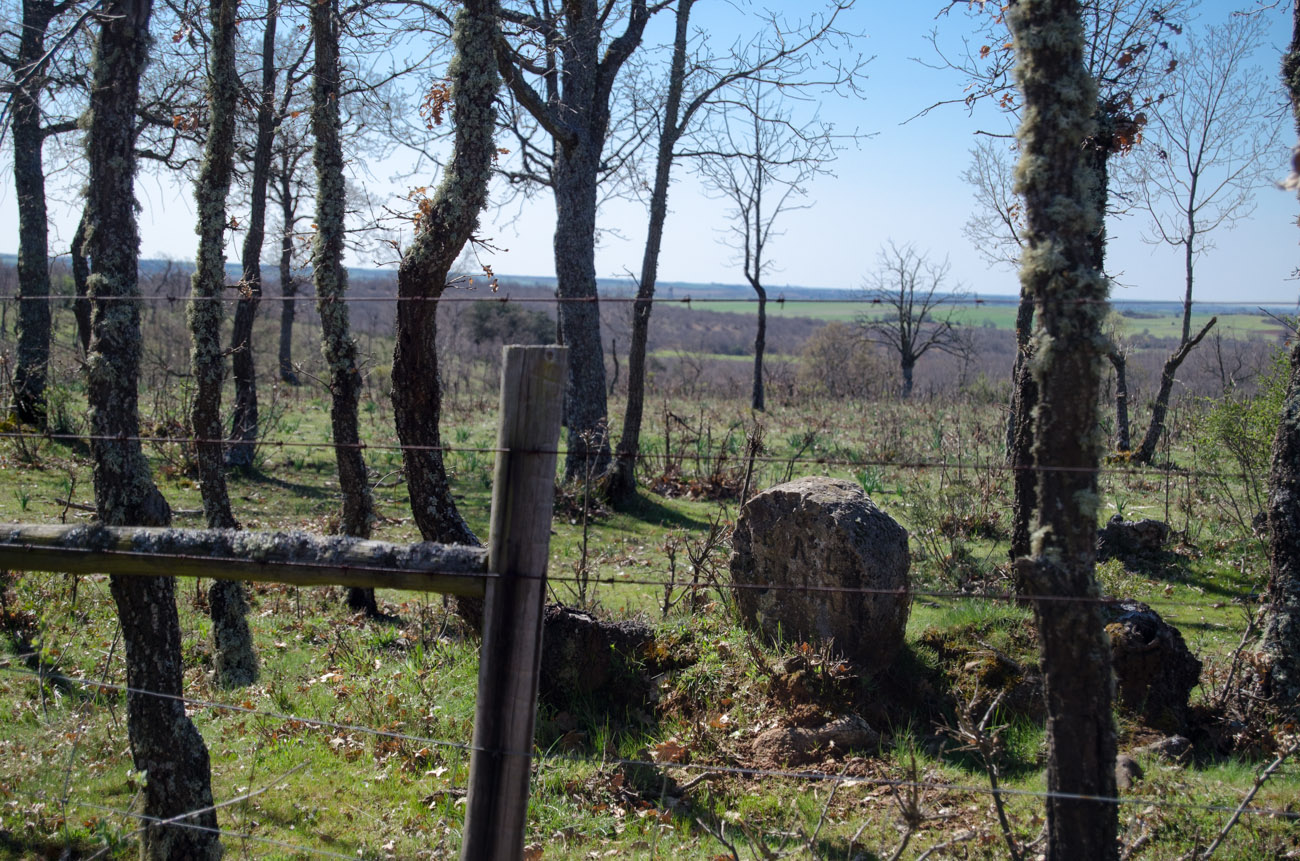
Santa María del Monte de Cea.

Santa María del Monte de Cea is a municipality located in the province of León, Castile and León, Spain. According to the 2004 census (INE), the municipality has a population of 331 inhabitants.

Within the municipality there are the following settlements: Banecidas, Castellanos, Santa María del Monte de Cea, Villacintor and Villamizar.

== See also ==
- Tierra de Campos
- Leonese language
- Kingdom of León
