= Montserrat Cervera Rodon =

Catalan anti-militarist and women's health activist

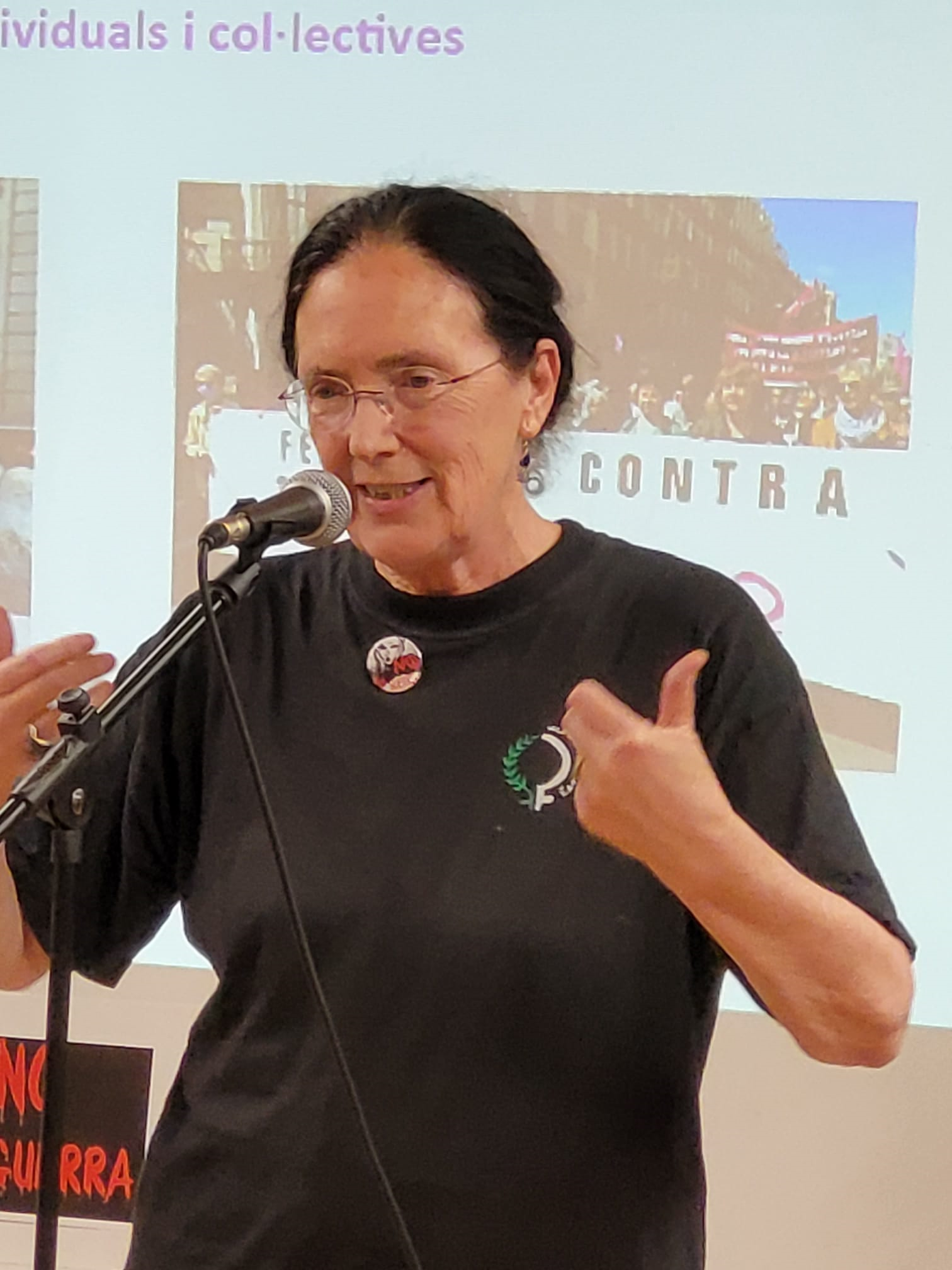

Personal details
- Born: July 27, 1949 (age 77) Barcelona, Spain
- Spouse: Jaume Roures (divorced)
- Education: University of Barcelona
- Known for: anti-militarist; feminist; women's health activist

Montserrat Cervera Rodon (Barcelona, July 27, 1949) is a Catalan anti-militarist, feminist, and women's health activist, involved in various feminist actions and campaigns such as the right to abortion.

== Biography ==
Montserrat Cervera Rodon has a degree in Contemporary history from the University of Barcelona, specializing in the oral history of women. Her professional life has always been linked to feminist non-governmental spaces and groups, especially the Centro de Análisis y Programas Sanitarios (Caps) (Center for Analysis and Health Programs) where she worked for 25 years, since 1997, focusing on women's health from a feminist perspective.

"Nosotras sabemos que la violencia, el militarismo y el patriarcado no llevan a la seguridad ni a la libertad, sino a la destrucción y la muerte."
(We know that violence, militarism and patriarchy do not lead to security or freedom, but to destruction and death.)
-Montserrat Cervera Rodon (5 March 2022)

She was a member of the Revolutionary Communist League (LCR) during the years of anti-Francoist struggle through the university movements and the student union. She was imprisoned in Madrid for almost three years following her arrest during the preparation of a demonstration, which is why she was unable to attend the 1976 Jornadas Catalanas de la Mujer (Catalan Women's Conference), although she continued to make an impact. She was released in November 1976 and joined a women's committee; since then, she has continued to be linked to feminist movements and the struggle for women's liberation.

In 1985, around May 24, Dia Internacional de las Mujeres por la Paz y el Desarme (International Women's Day for Peace and Disarmament), with Dones Antimilitaristes (DOAN) and having the support of many feminist groups, Cervera organized a line of women and a protest camp against the army and against the construction of a military academy for women in Tortosa. The mobilization had a great impact in experiential and political spheres, provoking a crisis in the municipal government and causing the PP to go into opposition.

In 1987, with the DOAN group, Cervera attended the Greenham Common Women's Peace Camp, an important event for the antimilitarist movement.

Cervera participates in women's health networks RedCAPS and Xarxa de Dones per la Salut in Catalonia. She is on the advisory board of the magazine Mujeres y Salud (MyS). She participates in the feminist space of Ca la Dona, in the antimilitarist group "Dones per Dones", in the Xarxa Feminista de Catalunya network, and in Novembre Feminista.

In June 1922, Cervera was a panelist at a Round Table of the Counter-Summit for Peace organized by the Platform for Peace Against Wars. NATO No Bases Outside.

She has a son and daughter.
