= Rodrigo Muñoz (Asturian count) =

Asturian noble

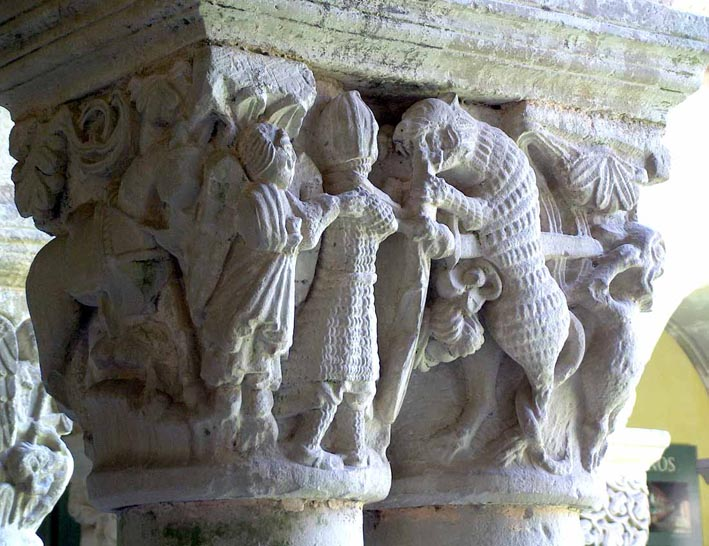
Twelfth-century Romanesque capital depicting a knight on horseback and another knight piercing a wild animal on his sword, from the Monastery of Santillana. Rodrigo's capital was Santillana some of his dealings with the monastery have come down to us.

Rodrigo Muñoz (floruit 1084–1116), son of Count Munio González and Mayor Muñoz, was a Castilian magnate in the kingdoms of León and Castile. His tenancies were mostly in Cantabria, in the northern Castilian lands bordering the Basque country.

Rodrigo is first mentioned in June 1085, when he and his sister Jimena made a pious donation to Santa María del Puerto. In July 1090 he and his brother Gutierre judged a lawsuit between the church and a certain Martín Cídez. He married a woman named Teresa sometime before March 1103, when they completed an exchange of properties (their land at Oreña for an estate in the Toranzo valley) with the monastery of Santillana del Mar. As early as 1104 he was ruling Asturias de Santillana, the eastern part of Asturias, bordering northwestern Castile. Rodrigo's daughter, called Mayor or Guntroda, married Pedro Fróilaz de Traba, a powerful Galician magnate, sometime before May 1105. By September 1105 Rodrigo had been appointed a count (Latin comes or consul) by Alfonso VI. This was the highest rank in Castile during the twelfth century. By February 1109 Rodrigo was also ruling Liébana in the far west of Castile.

After the death of Alfonso VI, Alfonso's daughter Urraca became queen. The day after the king's burial, 22 July 1109, Urraca confirmed all the privileges of the Diocese of León. Rodrigo was then present. In June 1110 Rodrigo signed the first document of Queen Urraca after her marriage to Alfonso the Battler in which she did not refer to him, simply calling herself "Queen of Spain" (Ispanie regina): a sign of Rodrigo's political allegiance. In January 1111 Rodrigo was again present at Urraca's court shortly after her husband had departed from it. On 11 August 1111, in a donation of Urraca to Santillana del Mar, he was cited as "Count Don Rodrigo of Asturias". By February 1112 he was governor of the Trasmiera, the Castilian lands north of the Miera river. He may have been displaced in Asturias by Rodrigo González de Lara, although this may have been brief: there is a royal charter of January 1113 that records Rodrigo Muñoz as count in Asturias. In May 1112 a certain count Rodrigo confirmed two royal charters as ruling in castella, "in Castile", that is, Old Castile. This may have been either Rodrigo Muñoz or Rodrigo González. Another charter, from late 1110, calls Rodrigo Muñoz "Count of Castile", but its accuracy is questionable. The last record of Rodrigo ruling in Asturias dates from February 1116.

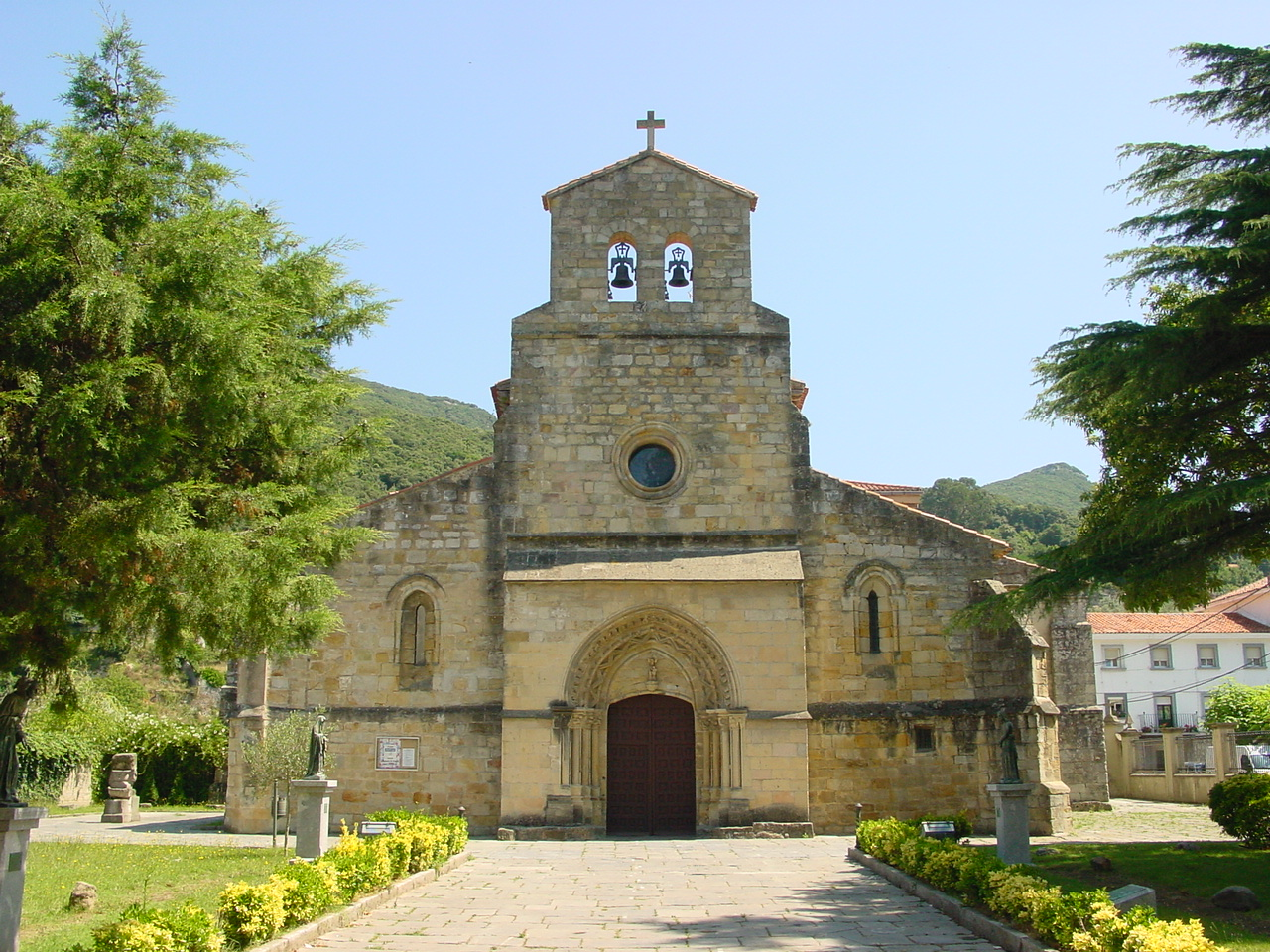
Santa María del Puerto, the only monastery known to have been patronised by Rodrigo. Still looking much as it did then.

The last record of Rodrigo alive dates to July 1116. One charter referring to comite Rodericus Munioz totius Asturiensis (count Rodrigo Muñoz of all Asturias) is misdated to 1082.
