= Rodrigo Muñoz (Galician count) =

Galician count

- Count
- Full name: Rodericus Muniz Gallecie
- Years active: 1073–1086
- Died: 23 October 1086; Sagrajas
- Wars and battles: Battle of Sagrajas
- Issue: Mayor Rodríguez
- Father: Munio Rodríguez
- Mother: Jimena Ordoñez

Rodrigo Muñoz (Note: His name is sometimes represented in older sources as Rodrigo Núñez. Though sharing a common origin, the names Nuño and Munio were distinct at this time. However, scribes and historians in later centuries came to use them interchangeably, such that the distinction was lost.) (floruit 1073–23 October 1086) was a Galician count in the Kingdom of León, best known for his death at the Battle of Sagrajas fighting for Alfonso VI of León.

As related by chronicler Pelagius of Oviedo, Rodrigo was son of count Munio Rodríguez by Jimena Ordoñez, a granddaughter of Vermudo II of León via his illegitimate son Ordoño. His paternal grandfather, count Rodrigo Romàniz, was nephew of rebel count Suero Gundemáriz and had himself rebelled against king Vermudo III. (Note: A genealogical account of the patrons of monastery of Santa Maria de Ferreira de Pallares, compiled in the 13th century, makes Rodrigo Romàniz himself a grandson of Vermudo II via an illegitimate son, Romano, but there is no other record of that king having a son by this name and it is chronologically untenable for Rodrigo Romàniz to have been the monarch's grandson. The House of Traba maintained a similar tradition, suggesting that Rodrigo Romàniz may have had royal origins, though misplaced generation-wise.) Rodrigo's father, Munio Rodríguez, had in turn briefly rebelled against Fernando I of León and was forced by the king's soldiers to flee into the mountains. Rodrigo Muñoz was closely related to the House of Traba and the Vela family of Bermudo Ovéquiz, both of which also descended from Rodrigo Romàniz. He had a full-brother, Suero Muñoz, and by his father's second marriage to Ilduara Velázquez, a half-sister Elvira Muñoz, wife of count Pelayo Gómez of the powerful Banu Gómez clan. His family had been benefactors of the monastery of Santa Maria de Ferreira de Pallares from its foundation in the tenth century.

Rodrigo Muñoz first appears in 1073, when he joined his parents and the entire court in confirming a donation made by Pelayo, Bishop of León. Just two years later he appears as count when he confirmed a donation made by Alfonso VI. He appears on additional royal grants in 1080 and 1082, in the latter charter as Rodericus Muniz Gallecie (Rodrigo Muñoz the Galician), a style that highlights his importance at court. He last is found witnessing a document in 1085.

Pelagius of Oviedo reports that he was killed at the Battle of Sagrajas. Fought on 23 October 1086 between the armies of Alfonso VI and the Almoravid king Yusuf ibn Tashfin, the battle resulted in a decisive Leonese defeat and the loss of a significant portion of Alfonso's army, though Rodrigo is one of the few dead explicitly named. Their own heavy casualties prevented the Almoravids from being able to capitalize on their victory, but it brought an end to Alfonso's expansion at the expense of the Muslim south.

Nothing is known of Rodrigo's marriage, but a 13th-century account of the Santa Maria de Ferreira de Pallares benefactors gives him a daughter, Mayor Rodríguez, (Note: Not to be confused with Mayor alias Gontroda Rodríguez, daughter of an Asturian count Rodrigo Muñoz, who married count Pedro Fróilaz de Traba, and was the mother of Rodrigo Pérez de Traba, son-in-law of the Galician Mayor Rodríguez) mother (by count Fernando Núñez) of Fronilde Fernández, the wife of count Rodrigo Pérez de Traba.

== Bibliography ==
- Canal Sánchez-Pagín, José María (1991). "Jimena Muñoz, Amiga de Alfonso VI". Anuario de Estudios Medievales. 21: 11–40.
- González López, Emilio (1978). Grandeza e decadencia do reino de Galicia. Translated by Francisco Fernández del Riego. Vigo: Editorial Galaxia.
- Salazar y Acha, Jaime de (1989). "Los descendientes del conde Ero Fernández, fundador de Monasterio de Santa María de Ferreira de Pallares". El Museo de Pontevedra (in Spanish) (43): 67–86. ISSN 0210-7791.
- Torres Sevilla-Quiñones de León, Margarita Cecilia (1999). Linajes nobiliarios de León y Castilla. Siglos IX-XIII (in Spanish). Salamanca: Junta de Castilla y León, Consejería de educación y cultura. ISBN 84-7846-781-5.
