= Espinosa de Cervera =

Coordinates: 41°54′N 3°28′W

- Municipality
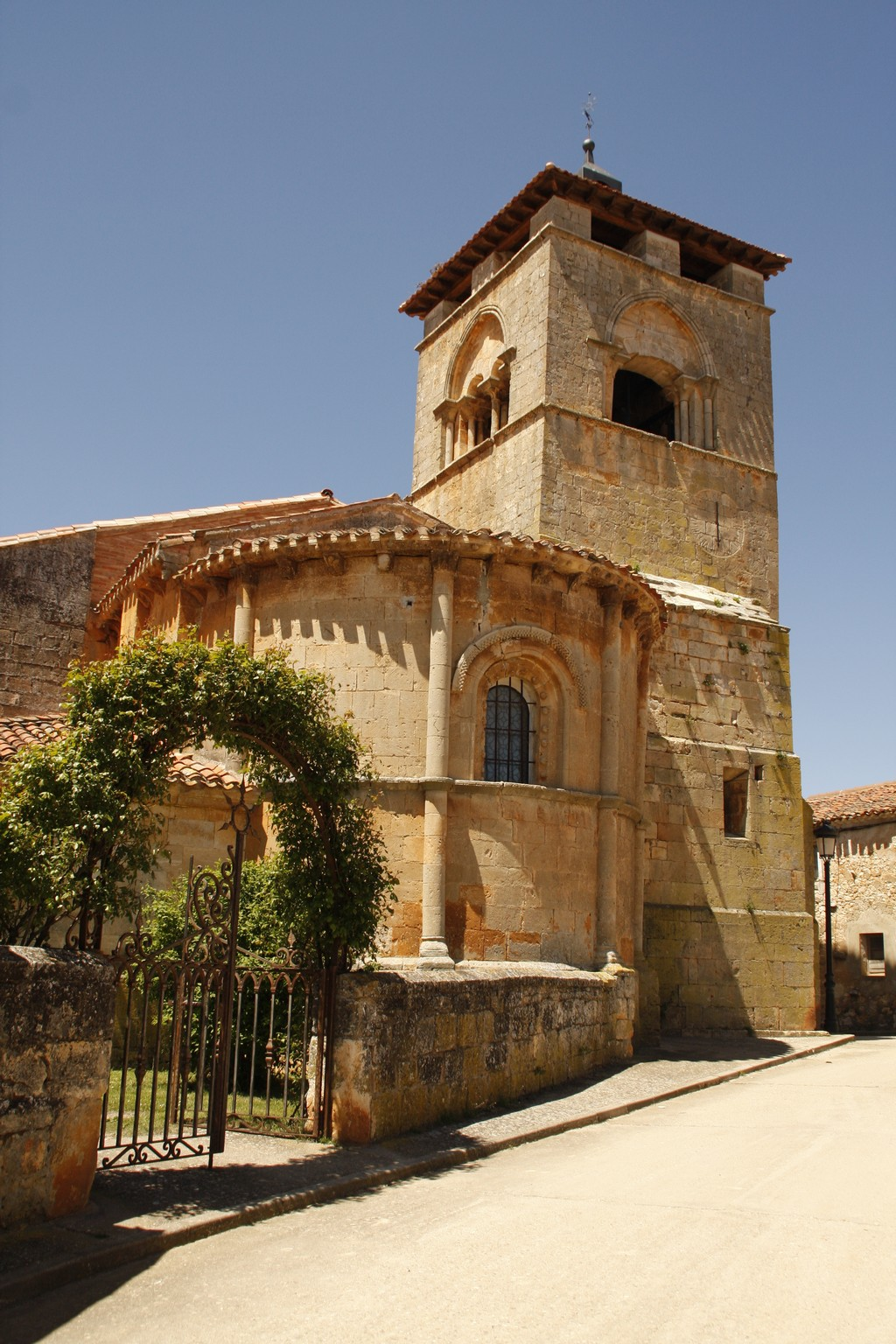
- San Millán church (13th-17th century)

- Coat of arms
- Interactive map of Espinosa de Cervera
- Country: Spain
- Autonomous community: Castile and León
- Province: Burgos
- Comarca: Arlanza

Area
  - Total: 30 km^{2} (12 sq mi)
- Elevation: 1,028 m (3,373 ft)

Population (2025-01-01)
  - Total: 81
  - Density: 2.7/km^{2} (7.0/sq mi)
- Time zone: UTC+1 (CET)
  - Summer (DST): UTC+2 (CEST)
- Postal code: 09610
- Website: http://www.espinosadecervera.es/

Espinosa de Cervera is a municipality located in the province of Burgos, Castile and León, Spain. According to the 2004 census (INE), the municipality has a population of 99 inhabitants.
