= Gontrodo Pérez =

Mistress of Alfonso VII of León (c.1105–1186)

Gontrodo Pérez (c. 1105 – 26 June 1186), called Gontrodo Petri in contemporary charters, was the mistress of King Alfonso VII of León with whom she had Urraca la Asturiana, queen consort of Pamplona by her marriage to King García Ramírez.

== Family relations ==
She was the daughter of the Asturian magnate Pedro Díaz de Valle and María Ordóñez. Gontrodo's paternal grandparents were Diego Gutiérrez and Gotina Pérez,and the maternal ones Ordoño Álvarez — alférez and descendant of Infante Ordoño Ramírez — and Gontrodo "Sol" Rodríguez. Her father, Pedro Díaz de Valle, was tenente of the Towers of León and of the valley of Mansilla Accordingly, her parents were not, as asserted by several historians, (Note: Among these historians, Margarita Torres Sevilla-Quiñones de León, mentions Francisco Javier Fernández Conde, Vicente Álvarez Palenzuela and Antonio Floriano Cumbreño.) simply members of the local nobility of Asturias. She had several siblings, including Diego Pérez Obregón the ancestor of the lineage Álvarez de las Asturias whose members include Cardenal Ordoño Álvarez and Rodrigo Álvarez de las Asturias from whom King Henry II of Castile inherited the lordship of Noreña.

== Descendants ==
Gontrodo was married to Gutierre Sebastiániz potestas or tenente of Aguilar, a fortress near the city of Oviedo. Gutierre appears for the last time in 1137 in a charter from the Monastery of San Salvador in Celorio. (Note: On 11 March 1133, Alfonso VII gave Guterio Sebastian the villa of Entratgo, in Cangas de Onís, next to the Buenna River.) Three children were born of this marriage:

- Sebastián Gutiérrez
- Diego Gutiérrez
- Aldonza Gutiérrez

While still married, Gontrodo had an affair and became the concubine of King Alfonso VII. This relationship began in 1132 when the king was in Asturias trying to quash one of the many uprisings of Count Gonzalo Peláez. In 1133, a daughter was born, Urraca, who became the wife of King García Ramírez.

== Foundation of the Monastery of Santa María de la Vega and her last years ==
On 13 October 1153, Gontrodo founded the Monastery of Santa María de la Vega in Oviedo. Her daughter, the widowed queen Urraca, who was already back in Asturias, confirmed the monastery's foundational charter which was also confirmed by King Alfonso VII. All the properties that she gave the monastery were hers, either given to her by the king or inherited from her parents. Pursuant to her wishes, the monastery was first ruled by the Order of Fontevrault which was not very common in medieval Spain. By 1283, the monastery had adopted the Rule of Saint Benedict.

Gontrodo became a nun in this monastery where she lived the rest of her life until her death on 26 June 1186. She was buried in a sarcophagus engraved with birds and dogs, stems and leaves. The monastery was abandoned on 31 July 1854 and the few nuns that were living there moved to the Monastery of Saint Pelagius in Oviedo, taking with them the sarcophagus of Gontrodo. The tombstone covering the sarcophagus is exhibited at the Archaeological Museum of Asturias.

== Gontrodo in some medieval charters ==
- On 11 March 1143, Gontrodo Petri donated Ambás and half of her inheritance in Tedaga on the condition that these properties could not be sold or lent. Charter confirmed by: (1st column) Diego, Ordoño, Gonzalo, and Rodrigo Pérez (her brothers); (2nd column) Sebastián Gutiérrez, Diego Gutiérrez, Urraca, and Aldonza Gutiérrez (her children).
- On 17 April 1147, she donated Entrático, which had been given to her by King Alfonso VII. Charter confirmed by: (1st column) Sebastián, Diego, and Aldonza Gutiérrez; (2nd column) regina Urraca Adefonsi.
- On 13 October 1153, accompanied by her daughter Urraca, founded the Monastery of Santa María de la Vega which was to be ruled by the congregation of Fontevrault.

According to professor Margarita Torres Sevilla-Quiñones de León, "...such primacy of these unknown Gutiérrez (Sebastián, Diego, and Aldonza) over their uncle Suero Ordóñez and her brothers (...) is not possible unless they are the children of Gontrodo Pérez".

== Bibliography ==
- Fernández Suárez, Ana (1995–1996). "Orígenes y ascensión de un linaje nobiliario asturiano: Los Álvarez de Noreña" (PDF). Asturiensia Medievalia. No. 8. pp. 239–261. ISSN 0301-889X.
- Martínez Vega, Andrés (1991). El Monasterio de Santa María de la Vega, Colección Diplomática. Oviedo: Instituto de Estudios Asturianos. ISBN 84-87212-12-3.
- Martínez Vega, Andrés (1994). El Monasterio de Santa María de la Vega. Historia y fuentes(S. XII-XIX. Oviedo: Real Instituto de Estudios Asturianos. ISBN 84-920049-0-8.
- Torres Sevilla-Quiñones de León, Margarita (1999). Linajes Nobiliarios en León y Castilla (Siglos IX -XIII). Salamanca: Junta de Castilla y León, Consejería de Educación y Cultura. ISBN 84-7846-781-5.
