= Urraca of Castile, Queen of Navarre =

Queen of Navarre from 1144 to 1150

Urraca the Asturian
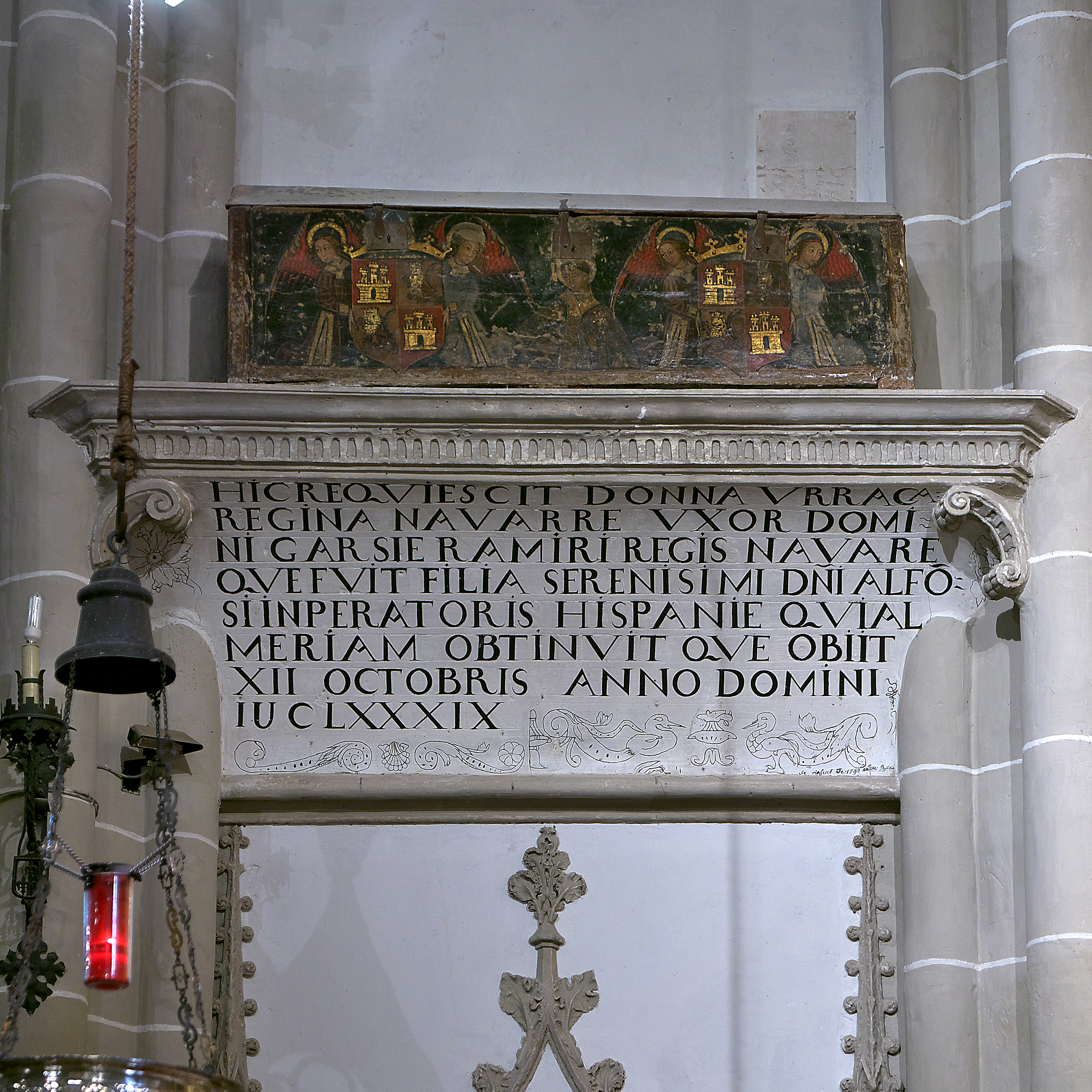
- Sepulcro de la reina Urraca, Catedral de Palencia

Queen consort of Navarre
- Tenure: 1144–1150

Queen of the Kingdom of Artajona
- Reign: 1144–1153
- Predecessor: Title created
- Successor: Sancho III of Castile

Regent of Asturias
- Regency: 1153–1165
- Born: 1133; Pelúgano
- Died: 1179 (aged 45–46); Palencia
- Burial: Chapel of Santa María Magdalena, Cathedral of Palencia
- Spouse: García Ramírez of Navarre; Álvaro Rodríguez de Castro
- Issue: Sancha, Viscountess of Béarn; Sancho Álvarez de Castro
- House: Castilian House of Ivrea
- Father: Alfonso VII of León
- Mother: Gontrodo Pérez

Urraca Alfonso (1133 – c. 1179), also known as Urraca the Asturian (Asturian: l'Asturiana; Spanish: la Asturiana), illegitimate daughter of Alfonso VII of León, was Queen Consort of Navarre by her marriage to García Ramírez. After becoming a widow, she returned to her homeland and was the regent of Asturias from 1153 to 1165. Urraca was involved in a rebellion against her half-brother, King Ferdinand II of León and with her second husband, Álvaro Rodríguez de Castro attempted to secure the independence of Asturias.

== Early life and family ==
An illegitimate daughter of King Alfonso VII and his mistress Gontrodo Pérez, Urraca was born in 1133 in Pelúgano, one year after her parents had a relationship while the king was still married to Berengaria of Barcelona and coinciding with the rebellion of Count Gonzalo Peláez, and one year before the birth of the legitimate heir, Sancho, born in 1134. Her maternal grandparents were members of the highest ranks of the Asturian nobility, her maternal grandfather, Pedro Díaz de Valle, being a descendant of several counts and his wife, María Ordóñez, a direct descendant of the Infantes Ordoño Ramírez and his wife Cristina Bermúdez. Her mother Gontrodo separated from Alfonso and joined a convent a year after Urraca's birth, and Urraca was raised in the court by her paternal aunt, Infanta Sancha Raimúndez.

== Queen of Navarre and Artajona ==
Urraca was first married in León on 24 June 1144 to García Ramírez of Navarre. This was a second marriage for Garcia as his first troubled marriage to Marguerite de l'Aigle had ended with her death just a month before Garcia's second marriage to Urraca that was arranged to strengthen Garcia's relationship with his overlord, Urraca's father. The couple were married for only six years before Garcia's death on 21 November 1150. Garcia was succeeded by his son with Marguerite de l'Aigle, Sancho VI of Navarre. Urraca's half-sister Sancha married Sancho and succeeded her as queen consort of Navarre.

She was also a queen regnant of the Kingdom of Artajona, a small kingdom within the Kingdom of Navarre, from her marriage to García Ramírez until her retirement to Asturias.

== Regent of Asturias ==
The queen dowager Urraca returned to her homeland after her husband Garcia's death in 1150, being sent by her father to govern Asturias. In Oviedo, Urraca took up residence in the Palace of Alfonso II of Asturias, which was next to the Cathedral of Oviedo. Her father gave her properties, including the lordship of Aller. Queen Urraca ruled Asturias from 1153 until 1165; she even retained power after the death of her father in 1157. (Note: According to Ricardo del Arco y Garay, she governed Asturias until 1164. Nevertheless, she appears ruling Asturias in 1165 in a charter from the Monastery of San Salvador de Celorio.)

Sometime before 1163, Urraca remarried to Álvaro Rodríguez de Castro, son of Rodrigo Fernández de Castro and Elo Álvarez. Álvaro was seigneur of Chantada and governor of Asturias between 1150 and 1171, of Sarria, and of the towers of León, as well as the alférez of King Fernando II and later his Mayordomo mayor. A charter from the Monastery of San Vicente de Oviedo in 1163 is dated: Alvaro Roderici cum uxore sua regina Urraca Asturias imperante ("Alvaro Rodríguez with his wife Urraca governing Asturias") and another charter from 1165 from the Monastery of San Salvador in Celorio also mentions that Queen Urraca was governing Asturias with her husband Álvaro.

Urraca and Álvaro were involved in an uprising to secure the independence of Asturias as attested in a charter from the Monastery of Santa María de Otero de las Dueñas which mentions "...when Queen doña Urraca and don Álvaro Roderici wanted King Fernando II to lose Asturias". (Note: In April 1174, in a private transaction between Nuño Meléndez and Martín Garín, Nuño mentions a loan that he had received previously from Martín quando domina Urraca regina et domnus Aluarus Roderici uoluerunt quod perdidisse dominus rex Fernandus Asturiis.) In the early months of 1164, King Fernando II thanked the Bishop of Oviedo for the aid provided to quash the uprising in Asturias.

It seems perfectly plausible that the high rank and prestigious "curriculum" of Urraca "la Asturiana" fed the secessionist cravings of Asturias which, during the 12th century was recovering its regional awareness spurred by the literary and administrative work of Bishop Gutierre of Oviedo. (translation)

This period was highlighted by their generosity with the Church in Asturias, to which they made numerous donations, notably those at the Cathedral of Oviedo, as well as those made to the monastery of San Pelayo de Oviedo. Urraca collaborated with her mother in founding the monastery of Santa María de la Vega in the outskirts of Oviedo where Gontrodo was eventually buried in a tomb the marker of which is currently preserved in the Archaeological Museum of the Asturias.

== Death ==
Urraca died at Palencia sometime after 1164 but the exact date of her death is unknown. Some chroniclers placed her death on October 26, 1164, but this is impossible, since she appeared with her second husband in 1165 in a charter in the Monastery of San Salvador de Celorio, and then again on 25 February 1178 at the Monastery of Santa María de Sandoval when she made a donation and asked to be buried there. (Note: On 25 February 1178 she donated several properties and asked to be buried there.) Although other sources place her death in 1189, according to the Anales toledanos she died in 1179. Queen Urraca was finally buried in the chapel of Santa María Magdalena in the Cathedral of Palencia. The reason could have been the fact that members of the House of Castro, of which her second husband was a member, had governed several places, including the city of Palencia.

== Issue ==
From her first marriage to King García Ramiréz was born:

- Sancha (1148–1176), married first to Gaston V of Béarn and secondly to Pedro Manrique de Lara, Viscount of Narbonne and Lord of Molina

Only one son was born of her second marriage to Álvaro Rodríguez de Castro:

- Sancho Álvarez de Castro (c. 1164 – after 1196) who appears on 23 July 1196 at the Monastery of San Pelayo in Oviedo as Dominante Asturias Sancius Alvari filius regina Urrace (Governing Asturias Sancho Álvarez, son of Queen Urraca).

== Bibliography ==
- Arco y Garay, Ricardo del (1954). Sepulcros de la Casa Real de Castilla (in Spanish). Madrid: Instituto Jerónimo Zurita. Consejo Superior de Investigaciones Científicas. OCLC 11366237.
- Casado Lobato, Concepción (1979). "¿Un intento de secesión asturiana en el siglo XII" (PDF). Asturiensia medievalia (in Spanish). No. 3. Oviedo: Universidad de Oviedo. Departamento de Historia Medieval. pp. 163–172. ISSN 0301-889X.
- Fernández Flórez, José Antonio; Herrero de la Fuente, Marta (2005). Colección documental del Monasterio de Santa María de Otero de las Dueñas (1109–1300) (in Spanish). Vol. II. León: Centro de Estudios e investigación «San Isidoro». ISBN 84-87667-78-3.
- Herrero Jiménez, Mauricio (2003). Colección documental del Monasterio de Villaverde de Sandoval (1132–1500) (in Spanish). Digital edition: Fundación Saber.es. León: Centro de Estudios e Investigación «San Isidoro», Caja España de Inversiones y Archivo Histórico Diocesano. ISBN 9788487667619. Archived from the original on 2015-09-24.
- Lipskey, Glenn Edward (1972). "The Chronicle of Alfonso the Emperor". A Translation of the Chronica Adefonsi Imperatoris. Available at the Library of Iberian Resources Online (LIBRO).
- Martínez Vega, Andrés (1994). El Monasterio de Santa María de la Vega. Historia y fuentes(S. XII-XIX) (in Spanish). Oviedo: Real Instituto de Estudios Asturianos. ISBN 84-920049-0-8.
- Reilly, Bernard F. (1998). The Kingdom of León-Castilla under King Alfonso VII, 1126-1157. University of Pennsylvania Press. ISBN 978-0-8122-3452-7.
- Salazar y Acha, Jaime de (1991). "El linaje castellano de Castro en el siglo XII: Consideraciones e hipótesis sobre su origen". Anales de la Real Academia Matritense de Heráldica (in Spanish). No. 1. pp. 33–68. ISSN 1133-1240.
- Torres Sevilla-Quiñones de León, Margarita Cecilia (1999). Linajes nobiliarios de León y Castilla: Siglos IX-XIII (in Spanish). Salamanca: Junta de Castilla y León, Consejería de educación y cultura. ISBN 84-7846-781-5.

Royal titles
Preceded by Margaret of L'Aigle	Queen consort of Navarre; 1144–1150	Succeeded by Sancha of Castile
