= Monastery of Saint Pelagius (disambiguation) =

Monastery of Saint Pelagius (Spanish: San Pelayo; Galician: San Paio) may refer to:

- Monastery of San Paio de Abeleda
- Monastery of Saint Pelagius, Oviedo
- Monastery of Saint Pelagius of Antealtares
- Monastery of San Pelayo de Cerrato

== See also ==
- San Isidoro, León, originally a monastery dedicated to Saint Pelagius
