= Ordoño Álvarez =

Asturian clergyman

- Cardinal-Bishop of Frascati
- Church: Catholic Church
- Diocese: Suburbicarian Diocese of Frascati
- In office: 12 March 1278 – 21 December 1285
- Predecessor: João Pedro Julião
- Successor: Giovanni Boccamazza
- Previous post: Archbishop of Braga (1275-1278)

Orders
- Created cardinal: 12 March 1278 by Pope Nicholas III

Personal details
- Born: 1198 Asturias, Kingdom of León
- Died: 21 December 1285 (aged 86–87) Rome, Papal States

Ordination history of Ordoño Álvarez
History
Cardinalate
- Elevated by: Pope Nicholas III
Episcopal succession
Bishops consecrated by Ordoño Álvarez as principal consecrator
- Ralph Ireton, C.R.S.A.: 24 March 1280
- William of Dunkeld: 19 December 1283
- William of Aberbrothoc, O.S.B.: 17 December 1284

Ordoño Álvarez (Portuguese: Ordonho Alvares) (Asturias, c. 1198 – 21 December 1285) was an Asturian clergyman, successively abbot of Santa María de Husillos, bishop of Salamanca, archbishop of Braga and cardinal-bishop of Frascati.

== Family origins ==
Ordoño Álvarez was a member of the House of Noreña, often referred to as the House of Nava, one of the most noble and ancient houses of Asturias, descendant of the infantes Ordoño Ramírez and Cristina Bermúdez. His father was Álvar Díaz who accompanied King Ferdinand III of Castile in the siege of Seville in 1248 and governed several tenancies including Siero, Nava, Aguilar and other localities. Ordoño's paternal grandfather was his namesake, Ordoño Álvarez de las Asturias, an important magnate during the reign of King Alfonso IX of León who participated in the conquest of Córdoba in 1236, and who was appointed mayor of Jaén and in charge of the repartimiento, or distribution of the conquered land.

Álvar had married Teresa Pérez Girón, daughter of Pedro Rodríguez Girón and his wife Sancha Peres de Lumiares, daughter of the Portuguese noble Pedro Afonso de Ribadouro, tenente of Neiva (1187) and Trancoso (1184), and his wife Urraca Afonso, an illegitimate daughter of Afonso I of Portugal. One of Ordoño's brothers was Pedro Álvarez de las Asturias, the father of Rodrigo Álvarez de las Asturias, count of Noreña, tutor of King Henry II of Castile who inherited the lordship of Noreña.

== Ecclesiastical career ==
He was appointed abbot of Santa María de Husillos on 1 July 1273 by Pope Gregory X and held this post until 13 July 1281. In this capacity, he attended the Second Council of Lyon in 1274. Ordoño was Archbishop of Braga from 1275 to 1278 and is also recorded as the bishop of Salamanca in 1281. On 12 March 1278, he was created cardinal by Pope Nicholas III and appointed Suburbicarian Bishop of Frascati, participating in the papal conclaves of 1280 and 1285 when Martin IV and Honorius IV were elected popes.

== Death and burial ==
Álvarez died in Rome in 1285 and was probably buried in the cloister of the Old Cathedral of Salamanca, as recorded in several documents.

== Bibliography ==
- Cardella, Lorenzo (1793). Memorie Storiche de' cardinali della santa Romana chiesa (in Italian). Vol. II. Roma: Pagliarini. OCLC 678868775.
- Cunha, Rodrigo da (1634–1635). M. Cardozo (ed.). Historia ecclesiastica dos arcebispos de Braga (in Portuguese). Part II, chapter XXXVIII. Braga. OCLC 491971424.
- Fernández Suárez, Ana (1995–1996). "Orígenes y ascensión de un linaje nobiliario asturiano: Los Álvarez de Noreña" (PDF). Asturiensia Medievalia (in Spanish) (8): 239–261. ISSN 0301-889X.
- Jacome de Vasconcelos, Maria da Assunção; Sousa Araújo, Antonio (1986). Bulário Bracaense. Sumários de Diplomas Pontifícios dos Séculos XI a XIX (in Portuguese). Braga: Arquivo Distrital de Braga. Universidade do Minho. OCLC 491593181. Archived from the original on 2016-03-03.
- Linehan, Peter; Torres Sevilla, Margarita (2003). "A misattributed tomb and its implications: Cardinal Ordoño Álvarez and his friends and relations". Rivista di Storia della Chiesa in Italia (57): 53–63. ISSN 0035-6557.
- Marcos Diez, David (2009). "La Abadía de Santa María de Husillos: Estudio y colección documental (904–1068)" (in Spanish). PHD thesis. Universidad de Valladolid. doi:10.35376/10324/857.
- Moroni, Gaetano (1840). Dizionario di erudizione storico-ecclesiastica (in Italian). Venecia: Tipografía Emiliana. OCLC 2066504.
- Sotto Mayor Pizarro, José Augusto de (1997). Linhagens Medievais Portuguesas: Genealogías e Estratégias (1279–1325) (in Portuguese). Oporto: Author's edition, doctoral thesis. hdl:10216/18023.
