= Monasterio de San Salvador =

Monasterio de San Salvador may refer to:

- Monasterio de San Salvador (Celanova)
- Monasterio de San Salvador (Celorio)
- Monasterio de San Salvador (Cornellana)
