= Suero Vermúdez =

Asturian nobleman

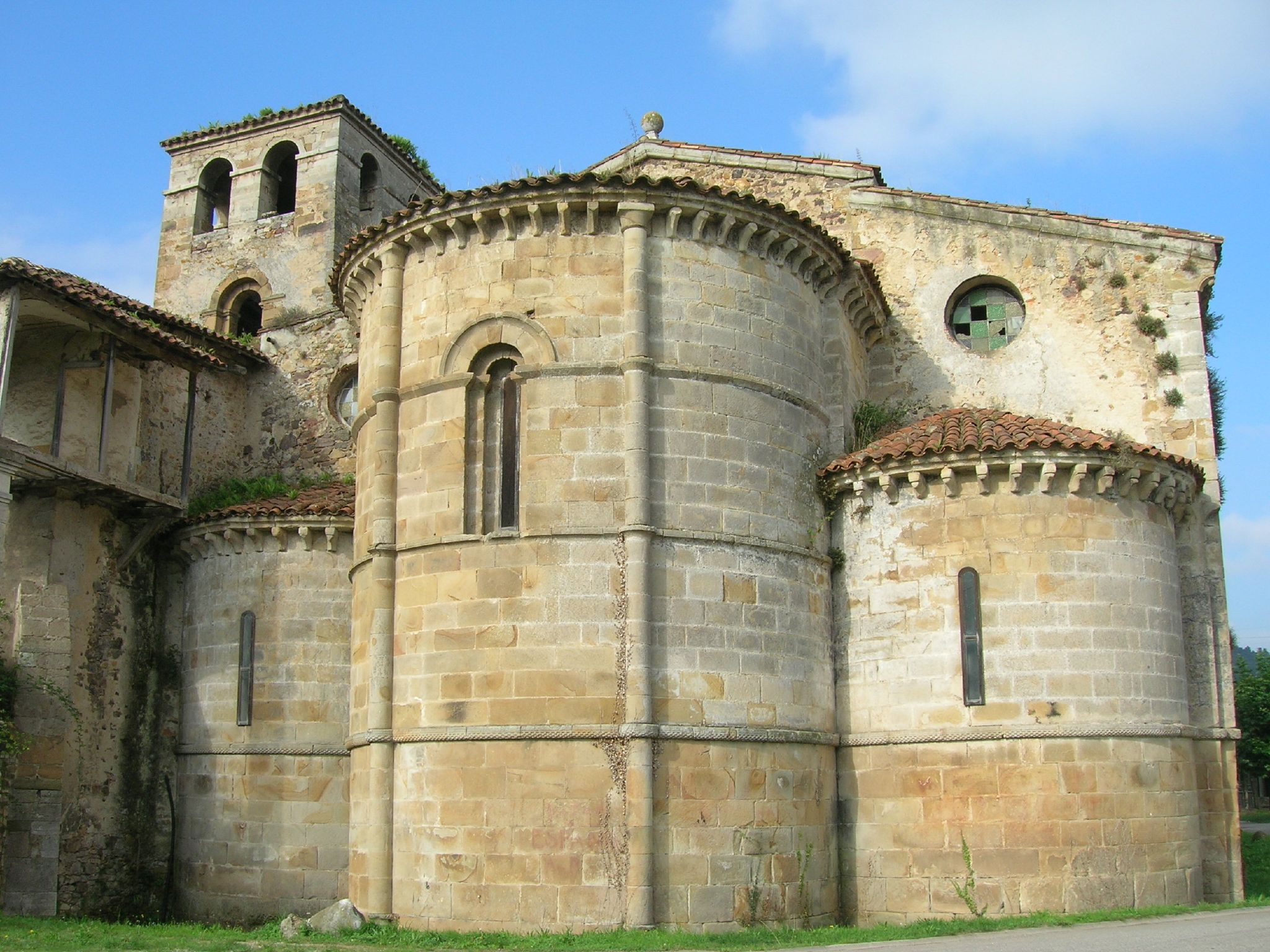
The monastery at Cornellana, which Suero gave first to Cluny (1122) and later to the see of Oviedo (1128), sparking a dispute that outlived him

Suero Vermúdez (or Bermúdez) (died 12 August 1138) was an Asturian nobleman, territorial governor, and military leader. His career was marked by loyalty to the crown of León-Castile during the reigns of Alfonso VI, Urraca, and Alfonso VII. He never took part in any revolt, but fought in many wars against rebels, against rivals, and against the Moors.

The primary sources for the life of Suero are the contemporary Historia compostellana and Chronica Adefonsi imperatoris plus some 150 surviving charters which mention, were drawn up by, or were confirmed by Suero. He held extensive lands and many interests in ecclesiastical properties. Out of his enormous wealth he was a generous patron of monasteries, and appears to have favoured the Benedictines and the Cluniac reform. The Chronica describes Suero, one of the few noblemen it praises, as "a man strong in counsel and a seeker of truth" and "a lover of peace and truth and a faithful friend of the king".

== Under Alfonso VI ==
Suero Vermúdez was the eldest son of Bermudo Ovéquiz, son of Oveco Vermúdez and Elvira Suárez, and Jimena Peláez, daughter of Pelayo Fróilaz and Aldonza (Eldoncia) Ordóñez. Suero was related—it is not known how—to Rodrigo Vermúdez, a majordomo early in the reign of Alfonso VII (1127–30), and his younger brother Muño was briefly the majordomo of Urraca in September 1109. He was also a great-grandson of infante Ordoño Ramírez son of King Ramiro III of León, and infanta Cristina Bermúdez, daughter of Bermudo II of León, and thus a descendant of royalty and very distant relative of his contemporary sovereigns. Cristina had founded the Benedictine monastery of San Salvador at Cornellana in 1024 and it had been divided up between her heirs. Regaining complete control of the monastery and its properties would be a major preoccupation of Suero. Besides his descent from King Vermudo II, Suero could claim kinship with Vermudo's enemy in Galicia, Count Suero Gundemáriz. Suero is commonly referred to in contemporary documents simply and unambiguously as "Count Suero" (Comes Suarius), without reference to his father.

The earliest secure reference to Suero is as a young man in 1092. There is a mangled record of a donation by Suero to the monastery of Lourenzá dated 10 March 1094, but which, if accurate, must be dated later than 1100, since Suero appears in the donation with a title he did not then possess. According to a document dated 28 March 1098, Suero was then serving Count Raymond of Galicia as armiger or standard-bearer (alférez). There is no other mention of this appointment, although a certain Suero Núñez who was his alférez on 1 May 1096 may be the same person with his patronymic erroneously copied. There is also only one record of Suero's first tenencia, a jurisdictional fief held directly from the crown and at royal pleasure. According to a charter copied into the tumbo (cartulary) of Lourenzá, Suero was governing Vilarente on 28 August 1099. He may also have governed Monterroso, an important fief in Galicia, under Count Raymond. By 1 April 1101 he was a count (comes), the highest rank in the kingdom, bestowed only by the sovereign. During the rest of the reign of Alfonso VI Suero held only one other tenencia: Rábade, where he is known to have been ruling between 23 January and 5 March 1104.

== Supporter of Urraca ==
Suero married Enderquina Gutiérrez, daughter of Gutierre Rodríguez and an important member of the Castilian aristocracy. On 30 December 1110 she received a grant from Queen Urraca and was styled comitissa (countess). Since women were not granted that title independently but used it only in the case that their husbands were counts, by this time Enderquina must have been married to Suero. On 27 June 1114 the couple made a gift of land at Torre de Babia to a certain vassal of theirs, Pelayo Fróilaz, for his loyal service. It is the first of series of donations between 1114 and 1129 that the couple made displaying their magnificent landed wealth. On 9 February 1116 Suero is cited in one charter as ruling the city and towers of León, the old imperiale culmen (imperial summit). It is probable that he also ruled the surrounding country. He certainly owned property in León, and he may have previously been its count in 1114. He is described as legionensium comes (count of the Leonese), possibly a mere title with no attendant jurisdiction. Over the next fifteen years he appears governing briefly at Gordón, Astorga, Cordove, and, in 1131, in Laciana and Paredes.

After the marriage of Alfonso VI's heiress, Urraca, to the King of Aragon and Navarre, Alfonso the Battler, in 1110, Suero consistently supported the queen against her husband. He was one of those who had confirmed Urraca's first act as successor of her husband Raymond in Galicia in December 1107. Only a day after the burial of Alfonso VI, on 22 July 1109, Suero was again one of those who confirmed Urraca's first act as successor. After the coronation of the queen's son by Raymond of Galicia, Alfonso VII, in September 1111, Suero, owing in part to his proximity to the Galician power base of Alfonso VII's backers, was the queen's most important supporter. By the fall of 1116 negotiations had begun between Urraca and Alfonso at Sahagún. According to the Historia compostellana, Suero and fellow Asturian Munio Peláez were the main defenders of the former, while the latter was supported by Diego Gelmírez, Archbishop of Santiago de Compostela, and Pedro Fróilaz de Traba. At Sahagún it was agreed to divide the realm into two spheres of authority, but these are not defined, although Galicia went undoubtedly to Alfonso VII. The accord was to last three years.

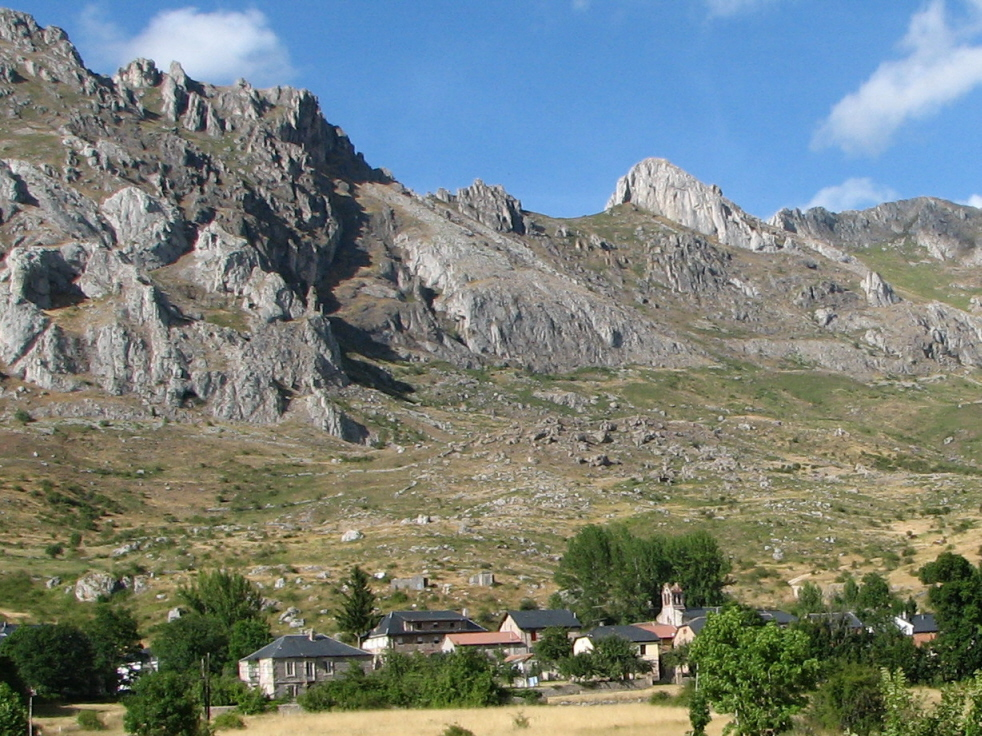
The region around Sena de Luna, the centre of the comarca of Luna and Suero's most enduring lordship.

In February 1117, however, Suero confirmed a diploma of Alfonso the Battler's as "Count Suero of Luna", perhaps having received Luna, in the mountains of León, from Alfonso. Suero can be further cited ruling Luna between 14 April 1117 and 27 March 1131. Suero and Enderquina received a gift of royal largesse as a reward for their loyal service ("in return for service", propter servicium) on 27 April 1120 from Urraca. On 26 March 1128 they received a second gift from Alfonso VII.

On 29 May 1117 Suero and Enderquina exchanged the monasteries of San Salvador de Perlora and San Andrés de Pravia with Bishop Pelayo of Oviedo for the monastery of San Juan de Teverga. This transaction was made in León, where it was confirmed by Urraca. On 4 March 1120 or 1121 Suero and Enderquina granted some properties they owned in Burgos to the Cathedral of Burgos. This charter survives in its original in the archives of the cathedral.

== Donations of Cornellana ==
In 1120 Suero made several deals with his relatives to gain control over their shares of the monastery of Cornellana, thus gaining sole proprietorship. That year he made two donations to the monastery (22 January and 8 November). At Lugo on 7 March 1122, in the presence of the royal court, Suero and Enderquina donated Cornellana to the Abbey of Cluny. Along with Cornellana itself they donated a block of properties "acquired by inheritance or by [their] own efforts" (de parentibus nostris vel de nostris ganantiis, "from our parents and from our purchases"). All the lands Cluny received amounted to "fifty-six different properties scattered across a vast area, as well as four monasteria [monastic centres], six churches and a castle (castellum)." Suero had received one church (ecclesiam) and three or four monasteries (monasteria) from Queen Urraca "by charter" (per incartationes), another three and a half churches plus a portion (portionem) in another he had inherited (called hereditates) or purchased (called gananciales). These were all proprietary churches he owned, but the difference between ecclesiae and monasteria is not clear. Cluny also received estates (villas) and male and female slaves (servos et ancillas). The donation was confirmed by Urraca, Alfonso VII, the queen's daughter Sancha Raimúdez, Diego Gelmírez, Pelayo of Oviedo, Diego of León, Peter III of Lugo, the prior of the monastery of San Zoilo de Carrión, and a "curious mixture of [lay] Galicians and Asturians". The charter was drawn up by a canon of the Cathedral of León who had probably followed the royal court to Lugo.

In December 1128 Suero and his wife reversed their prior donation of Cornellana to Cluny and bestowed it instead on the Cathedral of San Salvador in Oviedo; the total endowment of properties this time was about half the size of the prior donation to Cluny, and included two inns they owned in León. Further, the donation stipulated that "if they or any of their kin became destitute, ill or disabled they were to be cared for in the abbey for the rest of their lives." This second donation of Cornellana was confirmed in the presence of the royal court by no less than seventeen of the eighteen bishops of Alfonso's kingdoms.

Suero also made a generous pious donation to the Cathedral of Lugo on 19 May 1118 on the condition that the cathedral canons should perform a Mass for the sake of his soul every day for a year after his death and thereafter once a year on the anniversary of his death. In 1130 a synod held at Carrión dealt with the claims of Cluny to the monastery of Cornellana, disputes which had arisen from Suero and Enderquina's reversal of a prior grant. This grant had been one of the largest Cluny had received in Spain, and they argued to the Papal legate Uberto Lanfranchi at Carrión that in 1128 they had been "unjustly despoiled". The synod appears to have sided with Cluny, for Humbert sent a letter to Peter the Venerable, the abbot of Cluny, claiming that Suero and Alfonso VII were simply slow to comply. Cluny was still laying claim to Cornellana over 160 years later.

== Control of Asturias ==
Suero was one of the leading magnates of Asturias. He ruled Babia from at least 14 April 1117 and Tineo from at least 26 May 1120. He was still ruling these places as late as 21 May 1136, when he is cited in the same document as also governing the western half of Asturias centred on Oviedo. He was described as count "in Asturias" and Vadabia (Babia) in another private document of the same year. Bernard Reilly has suggested that it was around 1120 that Urraca began extending Suero's authority north out of the province of León and the Bierzo and into western Asturias.

After Alfonso VII succeeded Urraca, Suero immediately pledged loyalty to the new king at Zamora on 11 March 1126, three days after the death of the queen. He is the first magnate named when the Chronica Adefonsi imperatoris, a contemporary account of Alfonso's reign, lists those who did homage and fealty to the new king: Suero "came to him [Alfonso VII] with his friends and relatives, namely Alfonso his brother and his [Alfonso's] son Pedro Alfonso, who was later made count by him [the king]." Suero then joined up with the king's ally from across the Pyrenees, Alfonso Jordan, the Count of Toulouse, to take the city of León, which was being held against the king by supporters of the House of Lara. Only then did the remaining Leonese magnates make their way to the city to pledge allegiance to Alfonso. Although Suero was initially one of Alfonso's closest advisers, his increasing age and the consequent difficulty of following the court meant that he confirmed only some forty-three of the 252 charters issued by Alfonso between 1126 and early 1137.

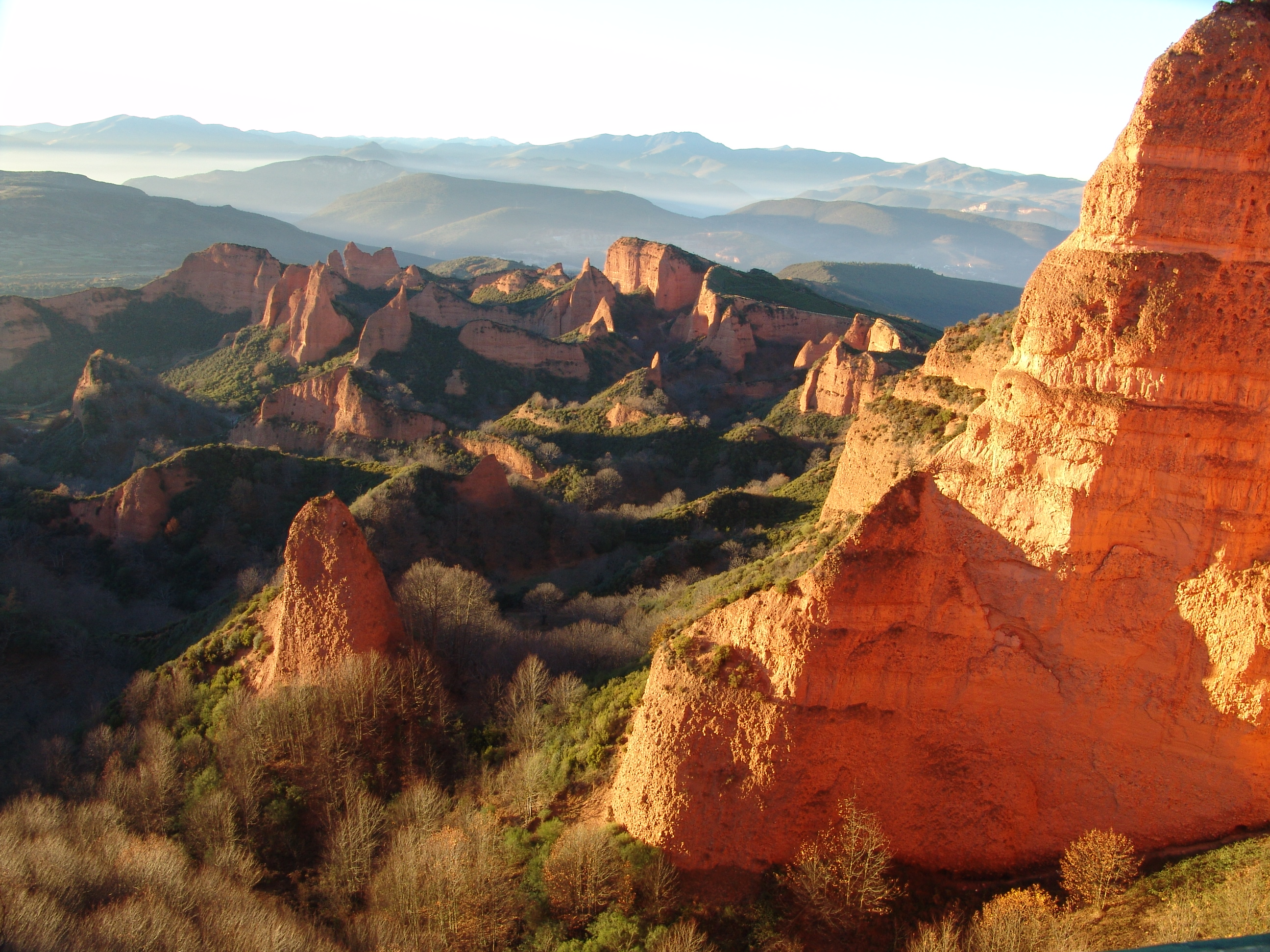
Las Médulas in the Bierzo, a region dominated by Suero in the early twelfth century.

At that time, according to the Chronica, the authority of Suero Vermúdez covered "Astorga, Luna, Gordón, with part of the Bierzo, as well as Babia, Laciana and the whole valley as far as the banks of the River Eo and as far as Cabruñana" (Astoricam, Lunam, Gordonem cum Bergidi parte, necnon Vadabiam et Flacianam totumque vallem usque ad ripam fluminis, quod dicitur Oua, et usque ad Cubrunianam). In the words of one modern historian, "Count Suero by then controlled all of the mountainous area between León and Galicia north to the [Bay of] Biscay and a long salient, north of León and south of Oviedo, running eastward almost to the borders of Asturias de Santillana." The description of Suero's lordship in the Chronica is corroborated by the charters and suggests that the various tenencias he is known to have held on at least one occasion formed part of a vast extended territorial lordship granted him in region of intersection between the provinces of Asturias, Galicia, and León. The majority of Suero's territory lay in the western Cantabrian Mountains, but he also had considerable lands in the Tierra de Campos in León. His southernmost estate was at Toro on the Duero. In 1128 Suero and Enderquina not inaccurately boasted that their lands stretched from the Duero to the Bay of Biscay and from the Llorio in the west to the Deva in the east. Another indication of Suero's wealth is the size of his household, since in 1119 he was employing a notary (notarius) named Juan to draw up his documents.

== Disputes with Corias ==
In 1114 Suero had to judge the first of three lawsuits he judged involving the monks of San Juan Bautista de Corias. He is known to have exchanged some estates with the monastery at an unknown date.

In 1128 Suero twice got into a dispute with the monastery of Corias over a piece of land at Peñaullán. He appointed two of his own knights, Martín Martínez and Pedro Menéndez, to make an enquiry into the dispute and adjudicate it. On 1 February 1129 Suero and his brother Gutierre made exchange of properties. Later that year Suero and fellow Asturian Gonzalo Peláez were sent by the king to Almazán to negotiate with Alfonso the Battler, who still laid claim to the Leonese-Castilian throne. Gonzalo had long been a rival with Suero in western Asturias. In 1131 a monk of Corias was bringing a large load of wheat from León to Laciana through the lands governed by Suero when he was stopped by two of the count's officials and assessed a toll. He refused to pay it and the dispute became violent. Subsequently, Suero was forced by the monks of Corias to make an enquiry, appointing two of his knights, Pedro Garcés and Juan Pérez, with the task. Their finding was that a similar dispute had occurred between Corias and Suero's brother Gutierre during the reign of Alfonso VI, and that the king had ruled the monks owed no portazgo (tolls on cartage) within the tenencia of Laciana. Suero therefore renounced his right to the toll. In 1132 Suero again judged a lawsuits involving Corias.

== Military activities ==
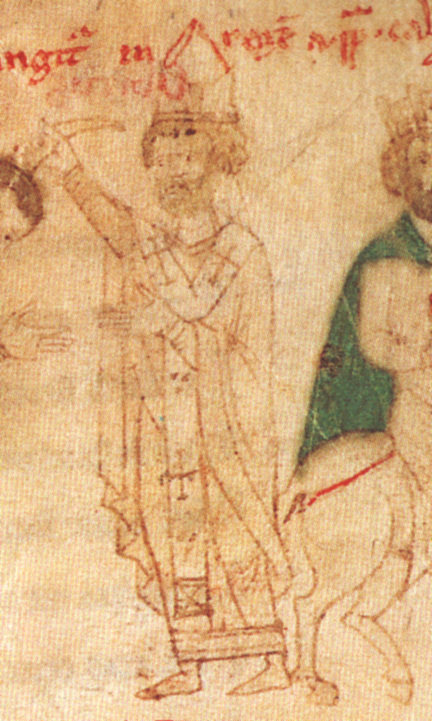
Pope Calixtus II himself supported the re-conquest of Sigüenza with the presence of his chaplain, Bonetus, in the crusading army.

In the fall of 1124 Suero took part in the reconquest of Sigüenza. By 11 November he was with the royal court at Segovia and by 30 November it had moved to Toledo in preparation. The subsequent path of the campaign is unknown, but Sigüenza had fallen by the last week of January 1125.

In 1133 Alfonso VII led a military expedition into the Asturias to reduce the rebel Gonzalo Peláez, who four years earlier had been sent on a diplomatic mission with Suero. Unsuccessful in the short run, Alfonso left the campaign under the aegis of Suero Vermúdez and Suero's nephew Pedro Alfonso. Suero had probably taken part in a similar expedition against Gonzalo the previous year, and was absent from court for most of 1132–34 despite the usual frequency of his visits. Operations against Gonzalo continued this way for two years before he and Alfonso came to terms by May 1135. Part of the terms of the peace—which appear to have been negotiated by Suero, Pedro, and Bishop Arias of León—were that Gonzalo would surrender the three castles in which he had held out for three years in return for receiving the lordship of Luna which had previously been held by Suero until at least 1131. The last contemporary charter which Suero subscribed is dated 25 June 1136 and contains no reference to any tenencias. As he died a little over two years later, it is probable that he was already too old and infirm to play a large part in public affairs. Suero is buried in the monastery of Cornellana, where his epitaph records the date of his death. He had no known descendants. He was succeeded in many of his tenencias (Tineo, Oviedo, Vadabia) by his nephew Pedro Alfonso.

== Bibliography ==
- Simon Barton. The Aristocracy in Twelfth-century León and Castile. Cambridge: Cambridge University Press, 1997.
- Simon Barton. "From Tyrants to Soldiers of Christ: The Nobility of Twelfth-century León-Castile and the Struggle Against Islam." Nottingham Medieval Studies, 44 (2000). At De Re Militari.
- Miguel Calleja Puerta. El conde Suero Vermúdez, su parentela y su entorno social: la aristocracia asturleonesa en los siglos XI y XII. KRK Ediciones, 2001. (There is a review by Pascual Martínez Sopena in Edad Media: revista de historia, 6 (2003–4), 263–69.)
- Carlos Estepa Díez. Estructura social de la ciudad de León (siglos XI–XIII). León: 1977.
- F. J. Fernández Conde. La iglesia en Asturias en la alta Edad Media. Oviedo: 1972.
- Richard A. Fletcher. The Episcopate in the Kingdom of León in the Twelfth Century. Oxford: Oxford University Press, 1978. At LIBRO.
- Richard A. Fletcher. Saint James's Catapult: The Life and Times of Diego Gelmírez of Santiago de Compostela. Oxford: Oxford University Press, 1984. At LIBRO.
- Antonio C. Floriano Cumbreño. Estudios de historia de Asturias. Oviedo: 1962.
- Bernard F. Reilly. The Kingdom of León-Castilla under Queen Urraca, 1109–1126. Princeton: Princeton University Press, 1982. At LIBRO.
- Bernard F. Reilly. The Kingdom of León-Castilla under King Alfonso VI, 1065–1109. Princeton: Princeton University Press, 1988. At LIBRO.
- Bernard F. Reilly. The Kingdom of León-Castilla under King Alfonso VII, 1126–1157. Philadelphia: University of Pennsylvania Press, 1998.
- Jaime de Salazar y Acha. "Una familia de la alta Edad Media: Los Velas y su realidad histórica". Estudios Genealógicos y Heráldicos, 1 (1985), 19–64.
- Alfonso Sánchez Candeira. "La reina Velasquita de León y su descendencia." Hispania, 10:40 (1950), 449–505.
