= Velasquita Ramírez =

10th-century Queen of León

Velasquita Ramírez (pronunciation: [βelaskita ramireθ]) (died c. 1035) was Queen consort of León as the first wife of King Bermudo II and mother of infanta Cristina Bermúdez, wife of Ordoño Ramírez.

== Biography ==
The family origins of Velasquita are uncertain. The inscription on a stone in the church in Deva, simply calls her filia Ranimiri ("daughter of Ramiro"). Manuel Risco, an 18th-century Spanish historian, believed that Velasquita was the daughter of King Ramiro II of León, but Velasquita never appears in medieval charters as filia Ranimiri regis, which would have been the custom at that time. Modern historians reject this filiation and believe that she could have been born to Ramiro Menéndez, son of Count Hermenegildo González and Muniadona Díaz, and his wife Adosinda Gutiérrez, daughter of Count Gutier Menéndez. This would harmonize with a document dated 5 January 999 in which Bermudo refers to Gonzalo Betótez, father of count Hermenegildo, as his (great-) grandfather. (Note: The inability to explain this relationship based on the known marriages of the royal family gave rise to speculation among historians that king Bermudo may have been illegitimate, born to king Ordoño III by a niece of Hermenegildo González. However, it would be consistent with the usage of the time for Bermudo to refer to his wife's ancestor as his own.)

She married Bermudo II between 980 and 11 October 981 when both appear together for the first time one year before Bermudo's reign, in a donation made by Galician count Menendo Menéndez to the Monastery of San Xulián de Samos in which Bermudo confirms as Veremudus, prolix Ordonius rex and Velasquita as uxor ipsius.

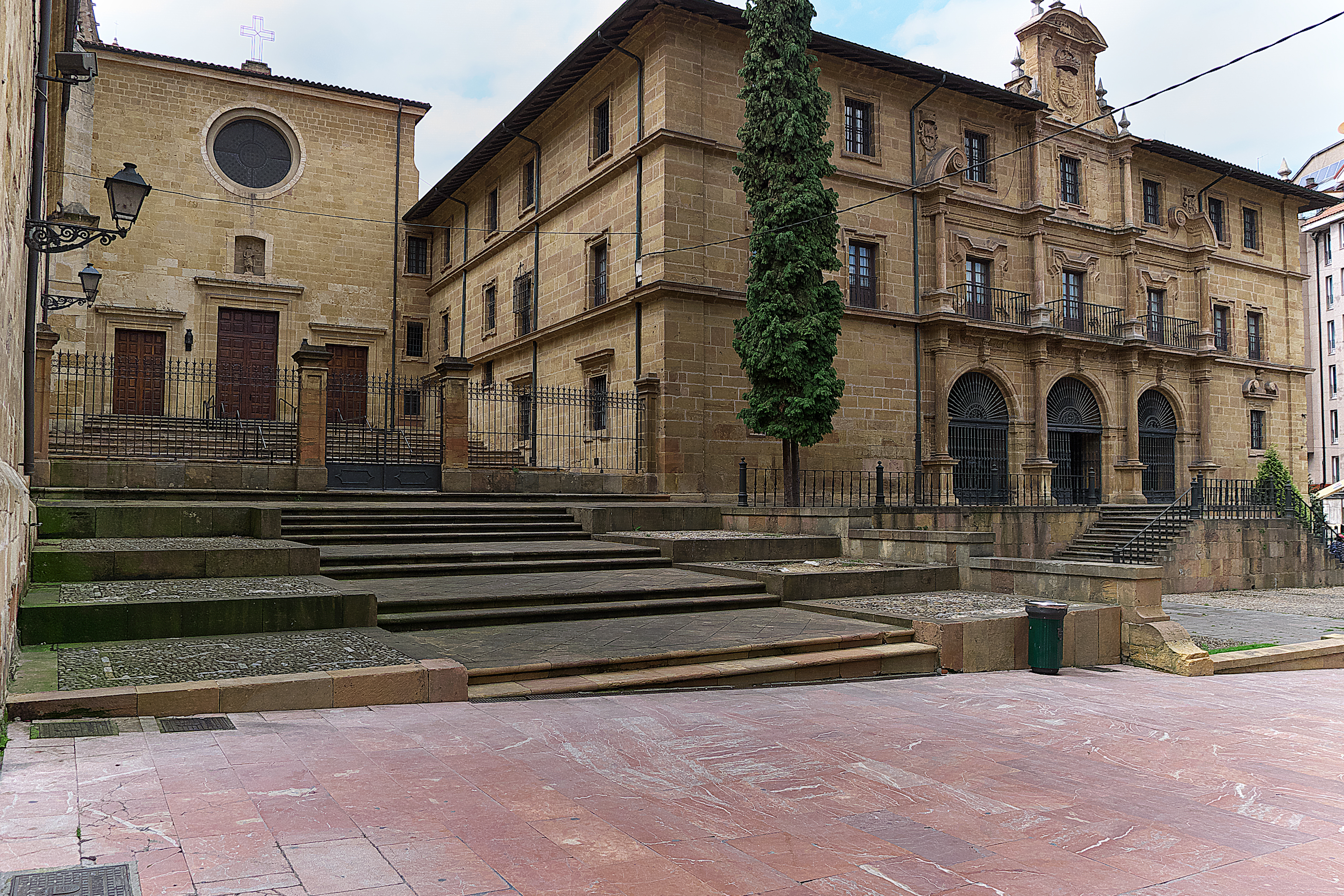
Monastery of San Pelayo where Velasquita lived as a nun.

They appear together for the last time at the end of 988 and she was probably repudiated a year later in 989. In 991, King Bermudo and his second wife, Elvira García, confirm a charter together for the first time. Velasquita left the court and settled in Oviedo with her daughter Cristina, and became a nun at the Monastery of San Pelayo, whose abbess at that time was the dowager Queen Teresa Ansúrez. Medievalist Margarita Torres believes that Velasquita and Teresa both planned and encouraged the marriage of Cristina, Velasquita's daughter, with Teresa's grandson, Ordoño Ramírez thereby joining both royal lineages. Velasquita appears on 14 March 996 at the Monastery of San Pelayo confirming a donation made by her former husband, King Bermudo and his second wife Elvira. In 1024, she was also present and confirmed the charter whereby her daughter Cristina, already widowed, founded the Monastery of Cornellana where she would eventually retire.

== Marriage and issue ==
By King Bermudo Velasquita had one known child, Cristina Bermúdez, who married infante Ordoño Ramírez, son of her father's rival Ramiro III of León and Sancha Gómez. (Note: In his 12th century Chronicon regum Legionensium, Bishop Pelagius of Oviedo would divide Velasquita into two distinct individuals, a wife legitimately married, and a mistress by whom Bermudo had an illegitimate daughter Cristina. While this may reflect questions as to Cristina's status after the repudiation of her parents' marriage, it is also part of a larger pattern of the Bishop portraying Bermudo in a disfavorable light. The fact that Queen Velasquita confirmed the charter where Cristina founded the monastery and also that the "loan" granted by the Cathedral of Oviedo to Queen Velasquita of the "court of Santa Cruz de Aquilone" passed on to Cristina and then to her daughter Aldonza, would indicate that Cristina was almost certainly the daughter of the queen and not of the Asturian peasant, as the Bishop had insinuated. Cfr. Sánchez Candeira (1950), pp. 482–483.)

Velasquita was a grandmother of Alfonso Ordóñez, Aldonza (or Ildoncia) Ordóñez (died after 1056), Ordoño Ordóñez (an important magnate and alférez of Ferdinand I of León and Castile) and Pelaya Ordóñez, known as "Doña Palla".

== Death and burial ==
The exact date of Velasquita's death is not known, but it was probably between 1028 and 1035. According to tradition, she was buried at the Monastery of San Salvador de Deva in Asturias, which she had founded before 1006 and had donated on 29 of August of that year to the Cathedral of Oviedo along with other properties such as the monasteries of Santa Cruz, San Juan de Abonio, and the church of San Martín de Salas.

== See also ==
- List of Leonese consorts

== Bibliography ==
- Calleja Puerta, Miguel (2001). El conde Suero Vermúdez, su parentela y su entorno social: La aristocracia asturleonesa en los siglos XI y XII (in Spanish). Oviedo: KRK Ediciones. ISBN 84-95401-68-1.
- García Álvarez, Manuel Rubén (1960). "¿La Reina Velasquita, nieta de Muniadomna Díaz?" (PDF). Revista de Guimarães (in Spanish). No. 70. Guimarães. pp. 197–230. ISSN 0871-0759.
- Sánchez Candeira, Alfonso (1950). "La reina Velasquita de León y su descendencia". Hispania: Revista española de historia (in Spanish). No. 40. Madrid. pp. 449–505. ISSN 0018-2141.
- Torres Sevilla-Quiñones de León, Margarita C. (1999). Linajes nobiliarios de León y Castilla: Siglos IX-XIII (in Spanish). Salamanca: Junta de Castilla y León, Consejería de educación y cultura. ISBN 84-7846-781-5.
