= Infanta Cristina =

Infanta Cristina may refer to:

- Cristina Bermúdez (c. 982-1051/67), daughter of King Bermudo II of León
- Christina of Norway, Infanta of Castile (1234 – 1262), wife of Infante Philip, son of King Ferdinand III, and daughter of King Haakon IV of Norway
- Infanta Cristina of Spain (born 1965), daughter of King Juan Carlos I
