= Monasterio de San Salvador (Cornellana) =

Monastery in Salas, Spain

Coordinates: 43.4091°N 6.1568°W

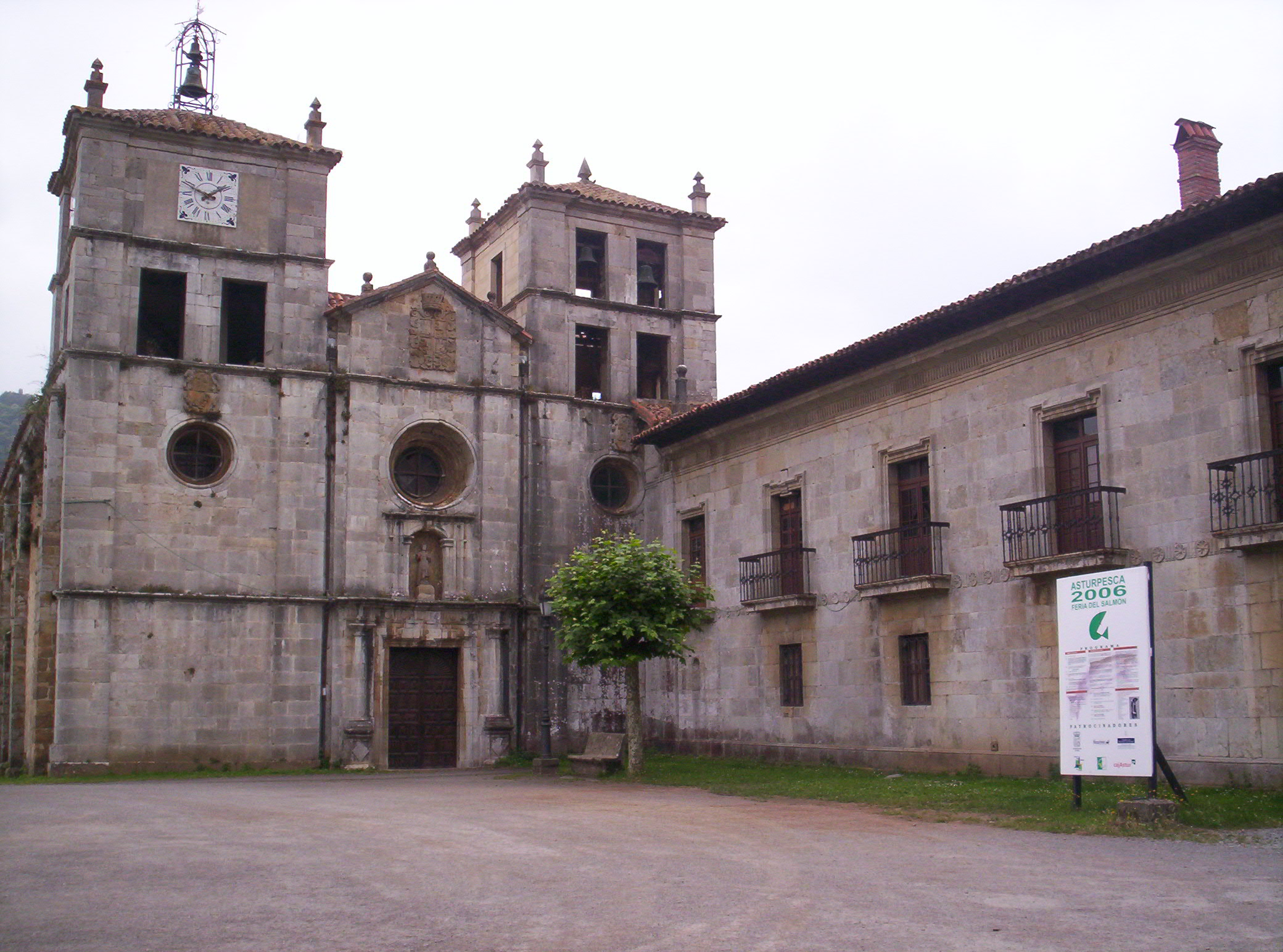

Location
- Location: Salas (Asturias), Spain
- Interactive map of Monasterio de San Salvador
- UNESCO World Heritage Site
- Type: Cultural
- Criteria: ii, iv, vi
- Designated: 1993 (17th session)
- Parent listing: Routes of Santiago de Compostela: Camino Francés and Routes of Northern Spain
- Reference no.: 669bis-006
- Region: Europe and North America
- Spanish Cultural Heritage
- Type: Non-movable
- Criteria: Monument
- Designated: 3 June 1931
- Reference no.: RI-51-0000803

Monasterio de San Salvador in Cornellana is a monastery located in Cornellana, municipality of Salas in Asturias, Spain.

Consisting of several Romanesque style buildings which started to be built in the 11th century, the monastery was founded by infanta Cristina Bermúdez, daughter of Bermudo II of León and his first wife Queen Velasquita Ramírez. She founded the monastery in 1024 after the death of her husband, infante Ordoño Ramírez "the Blind", son of Ramiro III of León and his wife Sancha Gómez. Cristina lived in the monastery as a nun and was buried there.

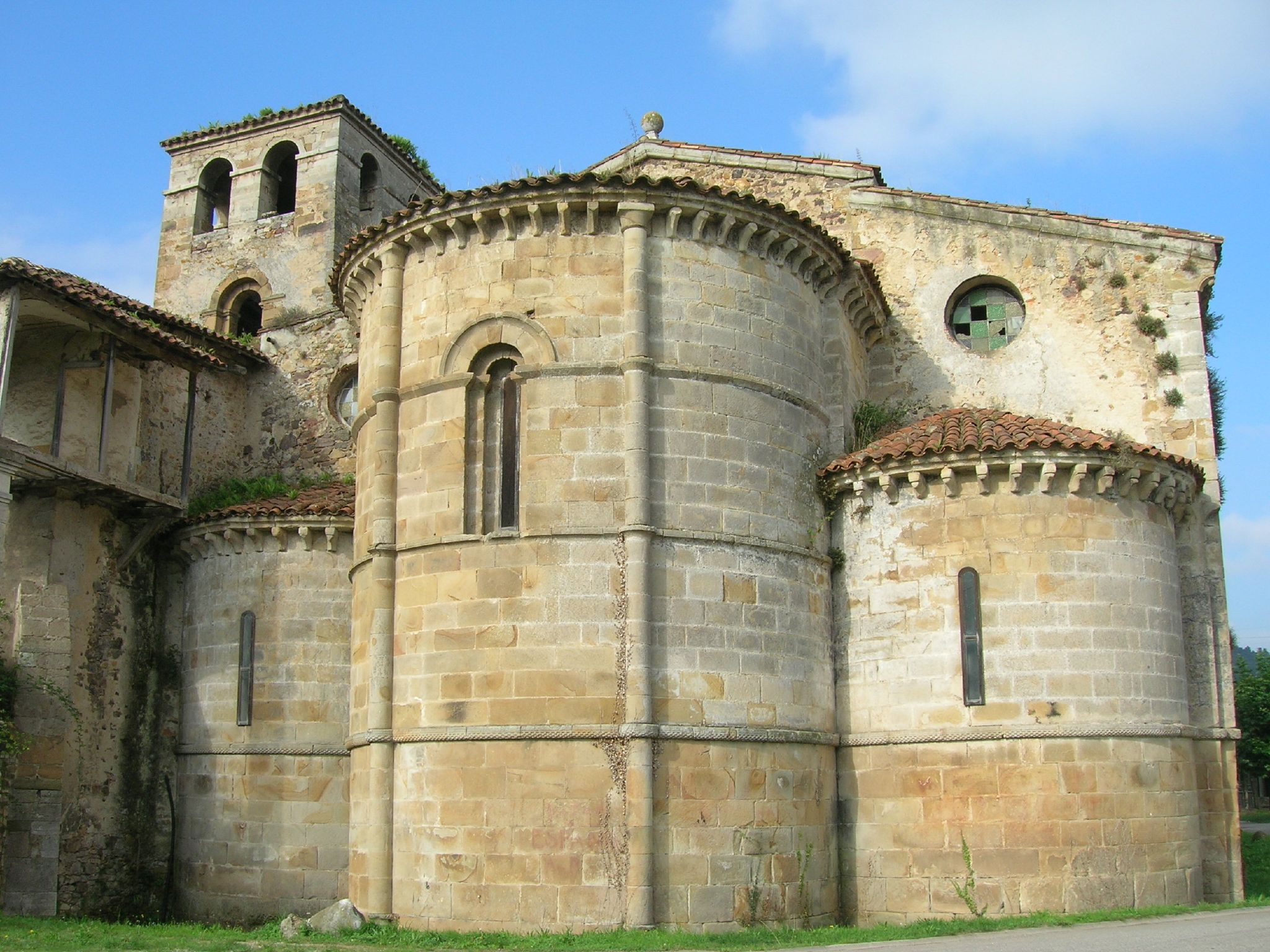

After her death, the monastery was divided among her heirs, her sons and daughters; Alfonso, Aldonza, Ordoño, and Pelaya Ordóñez. A great-grandson of Cristina, the powerful Count Suero Vermúdez in 1120 donated the monastery to the Abbey of Cluny and then to the Cathedral of Oviedo.

== Bibliography ==
- Prieto Entrialgo, Clara (2004). Coleición Diplomática del Monesteriu de San Salvador de Corniana (1024 - 1499). Oviedo: Academia de la Llingua Asturiana. ISBN 84-8168-370-1.
- Calleja Puerta, Miguel (2001). El conde Suero Vermúdez, su parentela y su entorno social: La aristocracia asturleonesa en los siglos XI y XII (in Spanish). KRK Ediciones. ISBN 84-95401-68-1.
