= Ordoño Ramírez =

Asturian noble

Ordoño Ramírez, called "the Blind" (c. 981–before 1024) was the son of King Ramiro III of León and Sancha Gómez, grandson of Sancho I of León and Queen Teresa Ansúrez and, on the maternal side, of Gómez Díaz, Count of Saldaña and Countess Muniadona Fernández.

== Biography ==
Appearing in medieval charters from 1014 until 1017 when he confirms two diplomas issued by King Alfonso V of León, Ordoño spent his life in Asturias. According to medievalist Margarita Torres, the conflicts between king Bermudo II of León and the Banu Gómez clan could have been due to the latter’s defense of Ordoño’s stronger claims to the throne, being the nephew of the new head of this powerful family, García Gómez, who succeeded his father Gómez Díaz as Count of Saldaña.

He died between 1017, the last time that he appears in the documentation, and before 31 March 1024, the date on which his wife Cristina, declaring herself a widow, makes a donation for the founding of the Monastery of Cornellana.

== Marriage and issue ==
He married probably shortly after 1000 and before 1016 infanta Cristina Bermúdez, daughter of Bermudo II of León and Velasquita Ramírez. This marriage was most likely planned by Velasquita and Ordoño's grandmother Teresa Ansúrez, both of whom were secluded in the Monastery of San Pelayo in Oviedo. The descendants of Ordoño and Cristina gave rise to the Ordóñez lineage, the most important one in 11th-century Asturias. They were the parents of:

- Alfonso Ordóñez (died in 1057 during the siege of Lamego), married Fronilde with whom he had two daughters, Cristina and Enderquina Alfonso. He is buried at the Monastery of Cornellana founded by his mother.
- Aldonza (or Ildoncia) Ordóñez (died after 1056) married Count Pelayo Froilaz, called "the Deacon", son of Count Froila Jimenez and nephew of Count Piniolo Jiménez, the founder of the Monastery of San Juan Bautista de Corias. They had at least seven children: Munio, Pedro, Ordoño, María and Teresa, also Elvira who died before her mother. They could also have been the parents of Countess Jimena Peláez married to Bermudo Ovéquiz and parents of the powerful Count Suero Vermúdez.
- Ordoño Ordóñez (died after 1073) was an important magnate and alférez of King Ferdinand I of León and Castile who entrusted him with the government of Palenzuela. Married to Enderquina, some historians believe that he could have been the father of Count García Ordóñez. Another daughter, María Ordóñez, married Álvar Díaz de Oca whose descendants include the counts of Noreña (Noronha in Portuguese) and Gontrodo Pérez, mistress of King Alfonso VII of León and mother of Urraca of Castile, Queen of Navarre.
- Pelaya Ordóñez, known as "Doña Palla", wife of the nobleman Bermudo Armentáriz, founder of the Church of Santa María de Otur in Asturias, and the parents of Martín Bermúdez.

The children of Ordoño and Cristina, as mentioned by Rodrigo Jiménez de Rada in his chronicle on Bermudo II, coincide with the information reflected in various charters from several monasteries in Asturias and from the Cathedral of Oviedo.

== Bibliography ==
- Calleja Puerta, Miguel (2001). El conde Suero Vermúdez, su parentela y su entorno social: La aristocracia asturleonesa en los siglos XI y XII (in Spanish). Oviedo: KRK Ediciones. ISBN 84-95401-68-1.
- Sánchez Candeira, Alfonso (1950). "La reina Velasquita de León y su descendencia". Hispania: Revista española de historia (in Spanish). No. 40. Madrid. pp. 449–505. ISSN 0018-2141.
- Torres Sevilla-Quiñones de León, Margarita C. (1999). Linajes nobiliarios de León y Castilla: Siglos IX-XIII (in Spanish). Salamanca: Junta de Castilla y León, Consejería de educación y cultura. ISBN 84-7846-781-5.
