= Cristina Bermúdez =

11th-century Leonese noblewoman

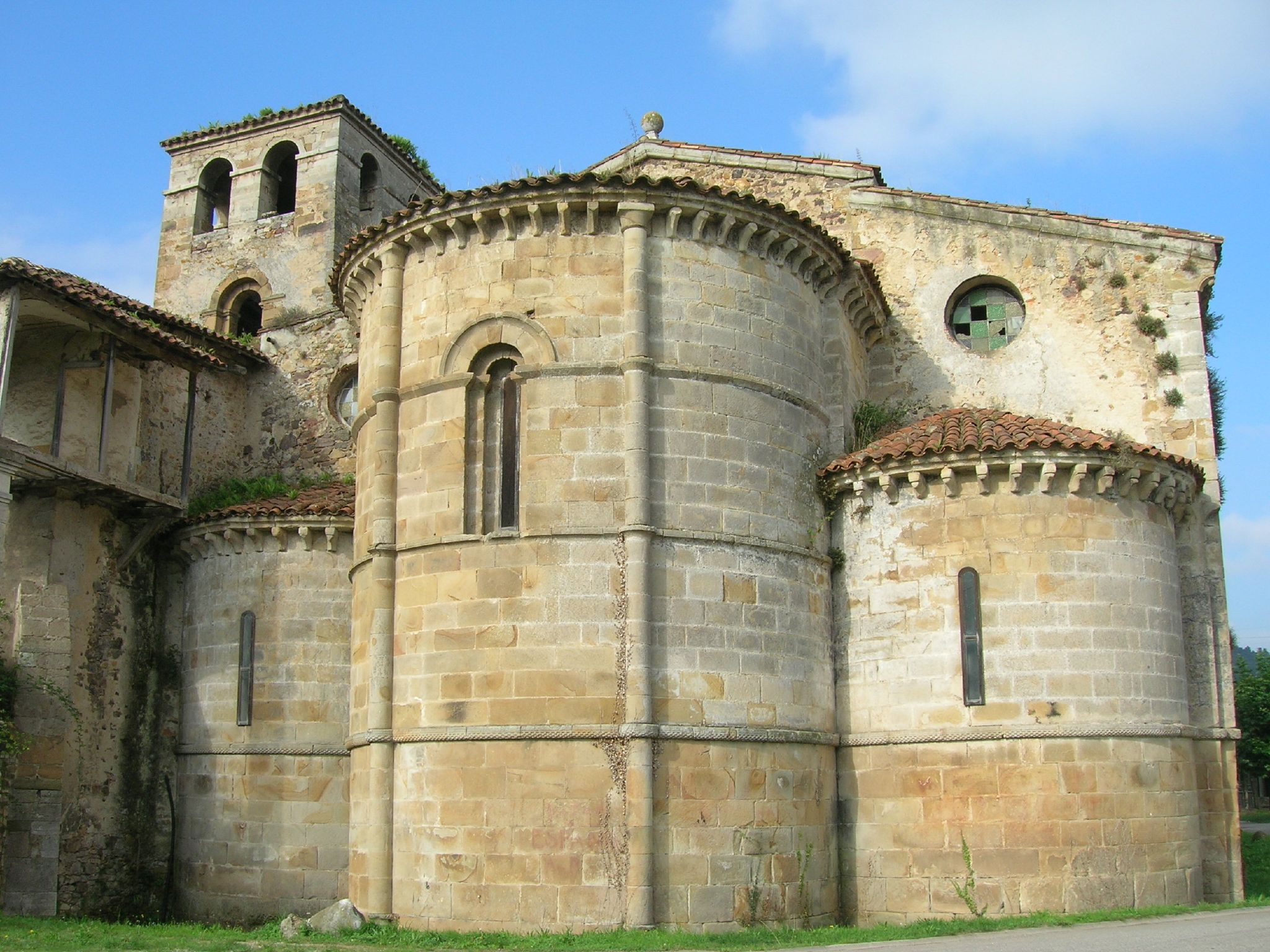
The Monasterio de San Salvador in Cornellana founded by Cristina

Cristina Bermúdez (pronunciation: [kristina beɾmudeθ]) (c. 982-Cornellana, 1051/1067) was an infanta of León, daughter of King Bermudo II (Note: Her filiation, as the daughter of King Bermudo II, is attested in a charter dated 22 December 1037 granted by Mumadomna, the widow of Count Gundemaro Pinióliz confirmed by Cristina Ueremudi regis filia and in another charter in the Cathedral of Oviedo where she is referred to as an infanta, the title given to the offspring of Iberian monarchs. Cfr. Sánchez Candeira (1950), pp. 480–481.) and his first wife Queen Velasquita Ramírez. On her father's side, her grandparents were Ordoño III and Queen Urraca Fernández, daughter of count Fernán González of Castile. Her grandparents on her mother's side were most probably Count Ramiro Menéndez and his wife Adosinda Gutiérrez, both members of the highest Galaico-Portuguese nobility.

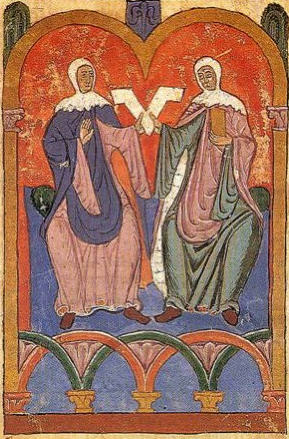
Teresa and Sancha Bermúdez, Infanta Cristina's half-sisters.

When her father King Bermudo repudiated his first wife and married Elvira García, with whom he had King Alfonso V of León and the infantas Teresa and Sancha Bermúdez, Cristina left the court in the city of León with her mother and settled in Asturias.

== Marriage and issue ==
Shortly after 1000 and before 1016, Cristina married Ordoño Ramírez, son of Ramiro III of León and most likely Sancha Gómez. From this marriage, probably encouraged and planned by Queen Velasquita and the widowed Queen Teresa Ansúrez, both living in the Monastery of San Pelayo in Oviedo, descends the lineage of the Ordoñez, the most important in Asturias during the 11th century. Rodrigo Jiménez de Rada in his chronicle on King Bermudo II mentions "...with Velasquita he had Infanta Cristina; this Cristina with Ordoño 'the Blind', son of King Ramiro, was the mother of Alfonso, Ordoño, countess Pelaya and Aldonza", information which coincides with the names of her children as found in the charters of several monasteries in Asturias, including the Monastery of the Holy Savior in Cornellana, the Monastery of San Juan Bautista de Corias and the Cathedral of Oviedo. These were Alfonso, Aldonza, Ordoño and Pelaya Órdoñez, also known as Doña Palla.

== Her last years ==
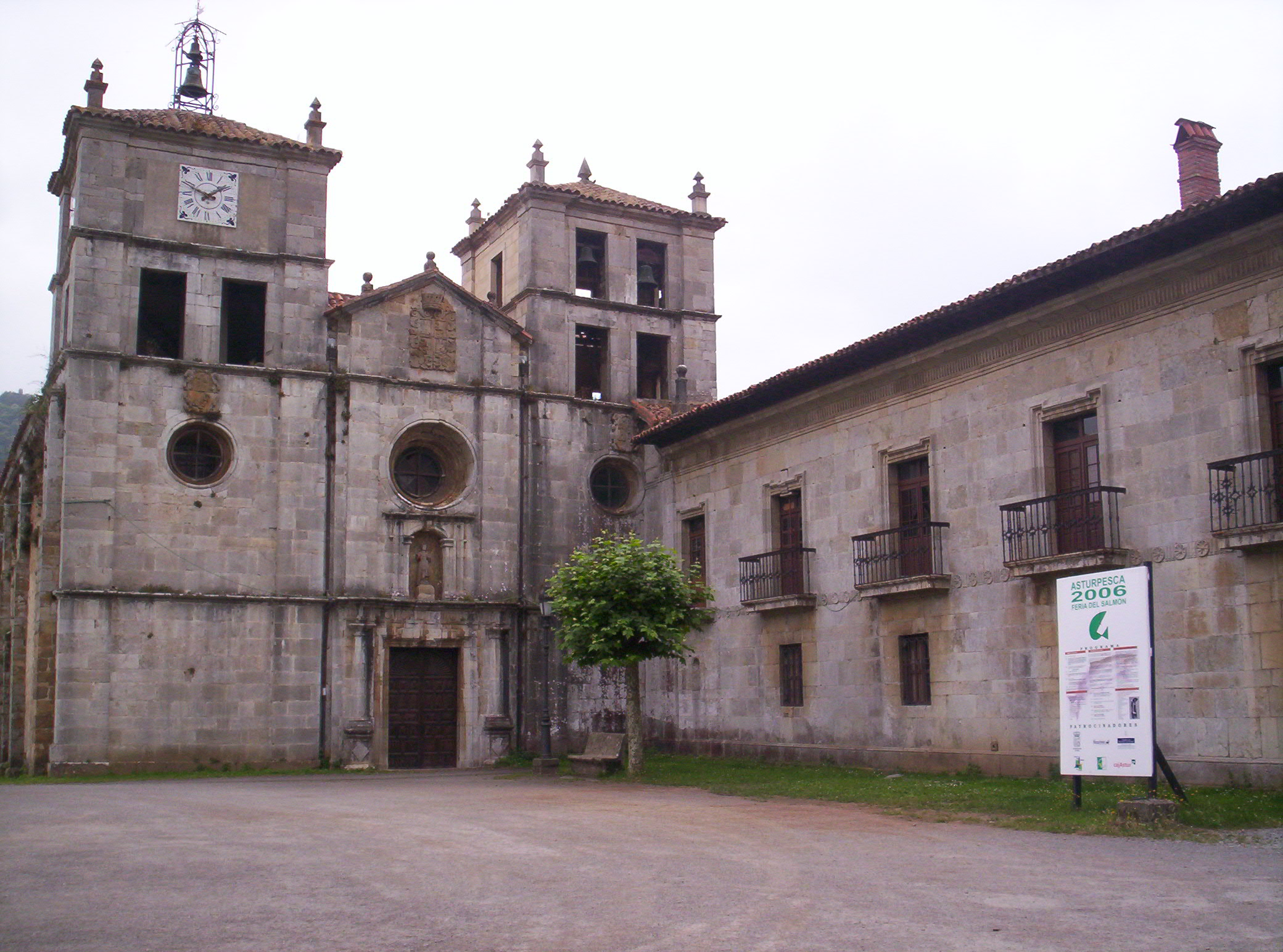
Monastery of the Holy Savior, Cornellana

Infanta Cristina was already a widow in 1024, as she states, when she made a donation for the founding of the Monastery of Cornellana. She died between 1051 — when she litigated with the Cathedral of Oviedo for the court of Santa Cruz de Aquilone that her mother Velasquita had "on loan" — and 1067 when her daughter Aldonza, also engaged in legal proceedings to have the cathedral grant her the same court. She was probably buried at the monastery which she founded and where she had become a nun.

Years later, Count Suero Vermúdez, son of Bermudo Ovéquiz and grandson of her daughter Aldonza Ordóñez, bought all the shares held by family members, donated the monastery to the Abbey of Cluny, but later reversed the donation and gave it to the Cathedral of Oviedo.

== Bibliography ==
- Calleja Puerta, Miguel (2001). El conde Suero Vermúdez, su parentela y su entorno social: La aristocracia asturleonesa en los siglos XI y XII (in Spanish). Oviedo: KRK Ediciones. ISBN 84-95401-68-1.
- García Álvarez, Manuel Rubén (1960). "¿La Reina Velasquita, nieta de Muniadomna Díaz?" (PDF). Revista de Guimarães (in Spanish). No. 70. Guimarães. pp. 197–230. ISSN 0871-0759. Archived from the original (PDF) on 2013-10-06.
- Sánchez Candeira, Alfonso (1950). "La reina Velasquita de León y su descendencia". Hispania: Revista española de historia (in Spanish). No. 40. Madrid. pp. 449–505. ISSN 0018-2141.
- Torres Sevilla-Quiñones de León, Margarita C. (1999). Linajes nobiliarios de León y Castilla: Siglos IX-XIII (in Spanish). Salamanca: Junta de Castilla y León, Consejería de educación y cultura. ISBN 84-7846-781-5.
