= Peḷḷuno =

Parish (parroquia) in Aller, Asturias, Spain

Peḷḷuno Pelúgano
- Parish
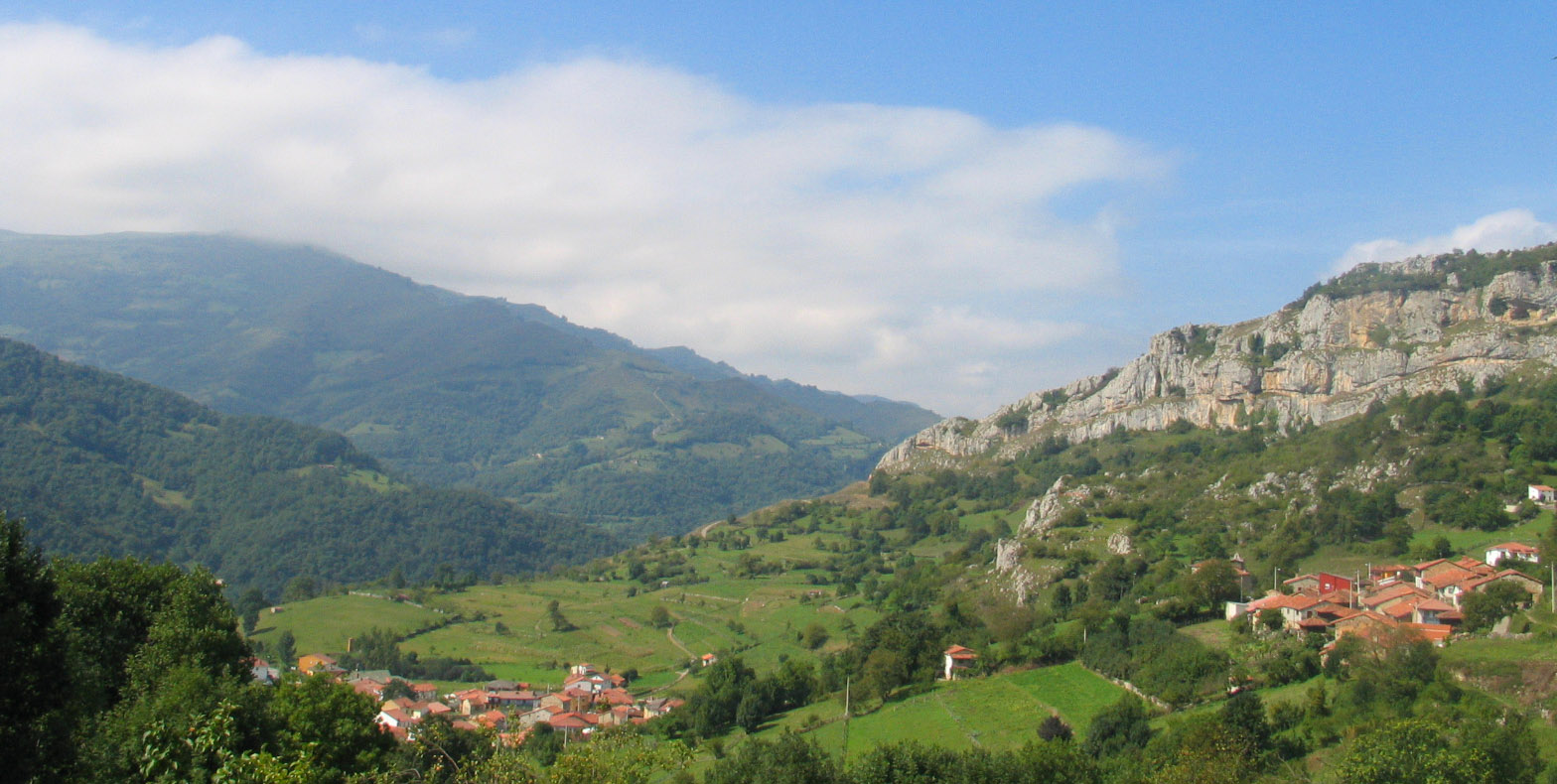

- Location within Spain
- Coordinates: 43.15056°N 5.5848°W
- Country: Spain
- Autonomous community: Asturias
- Province: Asturias
- Municipality: Aller

Area
  - Total: 16.6 km^{2} (6.4 sq mi)

Population (2024)
  - Total: 151
  - Density: 9.10/km^{2} (23.6/sq mi)
- Time zone: UTC+1 (CET)
  - Summer (DST): UTC+2 (CEST)

Peḷḷuno (Spanish name: Pelúgano) is one of 18 parishes in Aller, a municipality within the province and autonomous community of Asturias, in northern Spain.

The altitude is 570 m (1,870 ft) above sea level. It is 16.6 km^{2} (6.4 sq mi) in size with a population of 151 as of January 1, 2024.

== Villages ==
- Les Bolgueres
- El Barrobaxo
- El Barrocima
- La Barrosa
- La Bárzana
- El Cabenu
- La Casabaxo
- La Cascaya
- El Castiiḷḷu
- El Coḷḷéu
- Cueves
- Cueves de Baxo
- Cueves de Cima
- Entepenes
- Peḷḷuno
- El Pendu la Tabla
- El Vaḷḷe
- La Vaḷḷina
- El Yenu
