= Monastery of San Paio de Abeleda =

Monastery in Galicia, Spain

Coordinates: 42°23′22″N 07°26′55″W

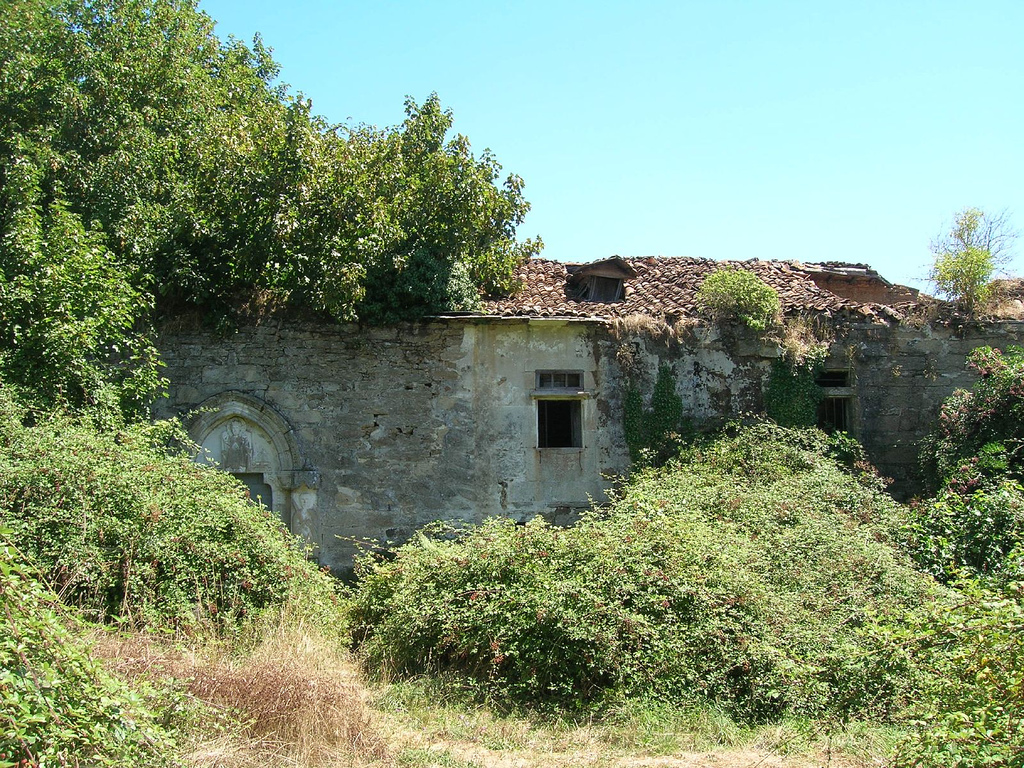
Image of the monastery showing current state of ruin.

The Monastery of San Paio de Abeleda is a medieval monastery built in the 12th century located 2 km from Abeleda, in the Galician province of Orense, Spain. Today found in a state of ruins, it was originally one of the most influential monastic centres in the province and was converted into an abbey surviving until the 19th century Ecclesiastical Confiscations of Mendizábal. It was acquired by the House of Alba in 1872.

== Location ==
The monastery is situated in the parish of San Paio de Abeleda, in the municipality of Castro Caldelas.

== The Church ==
The church was built in the Romanesque style in the 12th century (with further alterations later). In plan it takes the form of a Latin cross. It consists of a single nave with 3 wings separated by pointed arches with archivolts decorated with chequered imposts and the capitals are adorned with flowers and chimeras. Traces of the original paint on the capitals, which had been maintained for several centuries, still remain visible today. The church was greatly reformed during the 16th century however a door from the 13th or 14th century was preserved. The main altar dates to the 17th century.

The facade of the cloister is in the Gothic style, and features a quatrefoil Gothic arch.

Recently, in 2005, the monastery fell victim to plundering of several Baroque and Neoclassical altars, and some columns from the old cloister.

== Image Gallery ==
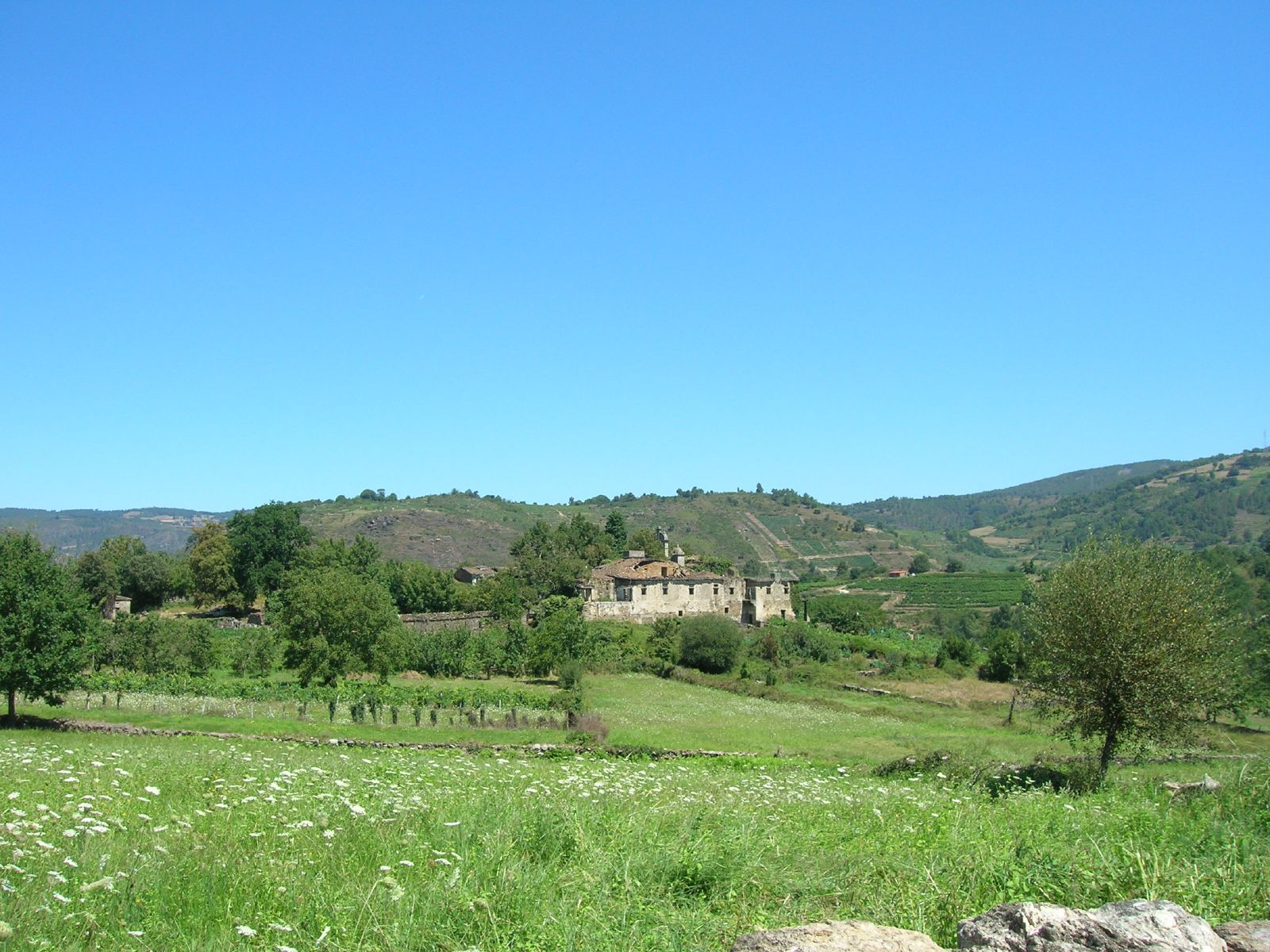
View of San Paio de Abelenda from Santa Tecla

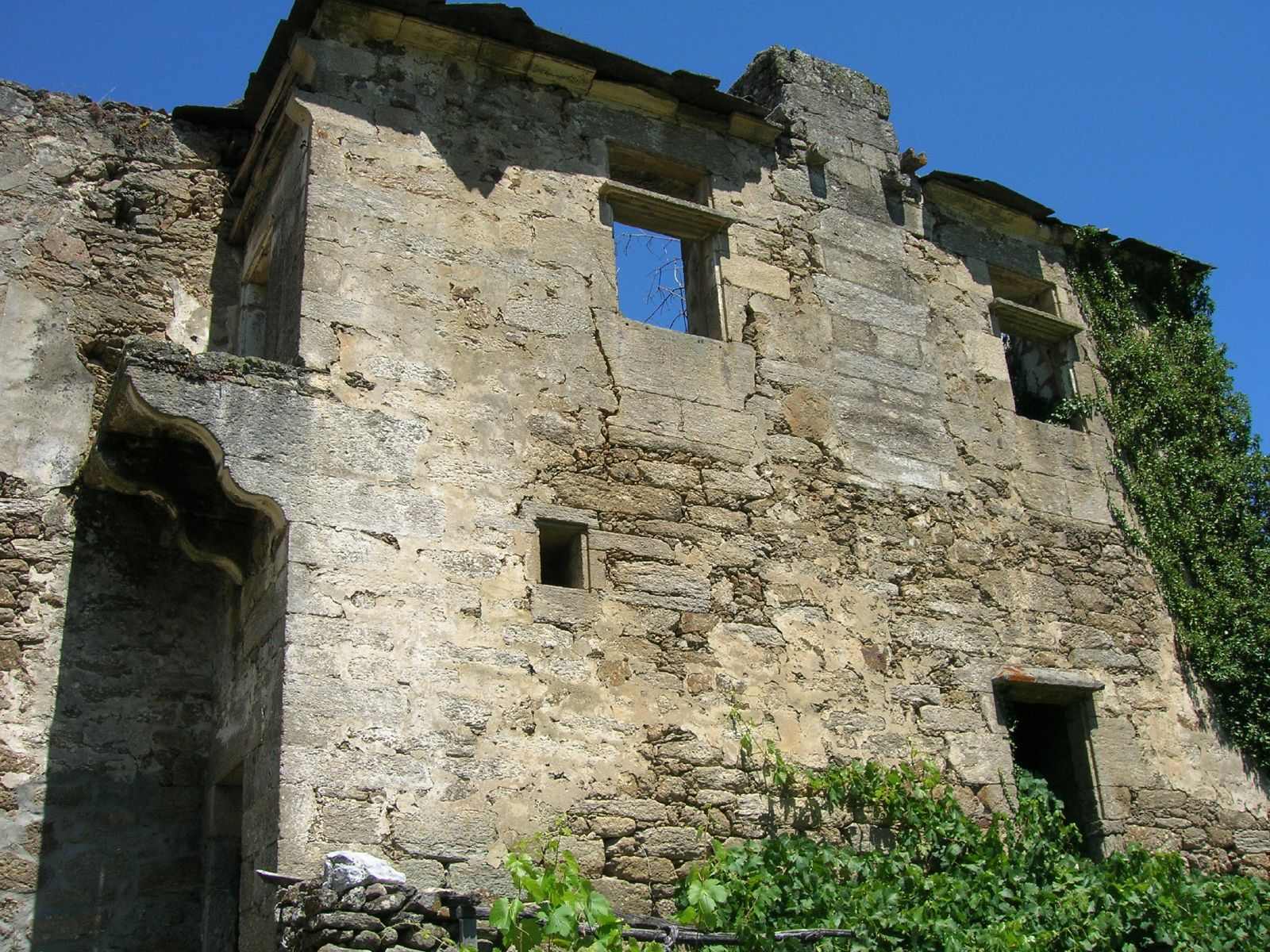
One of the facades

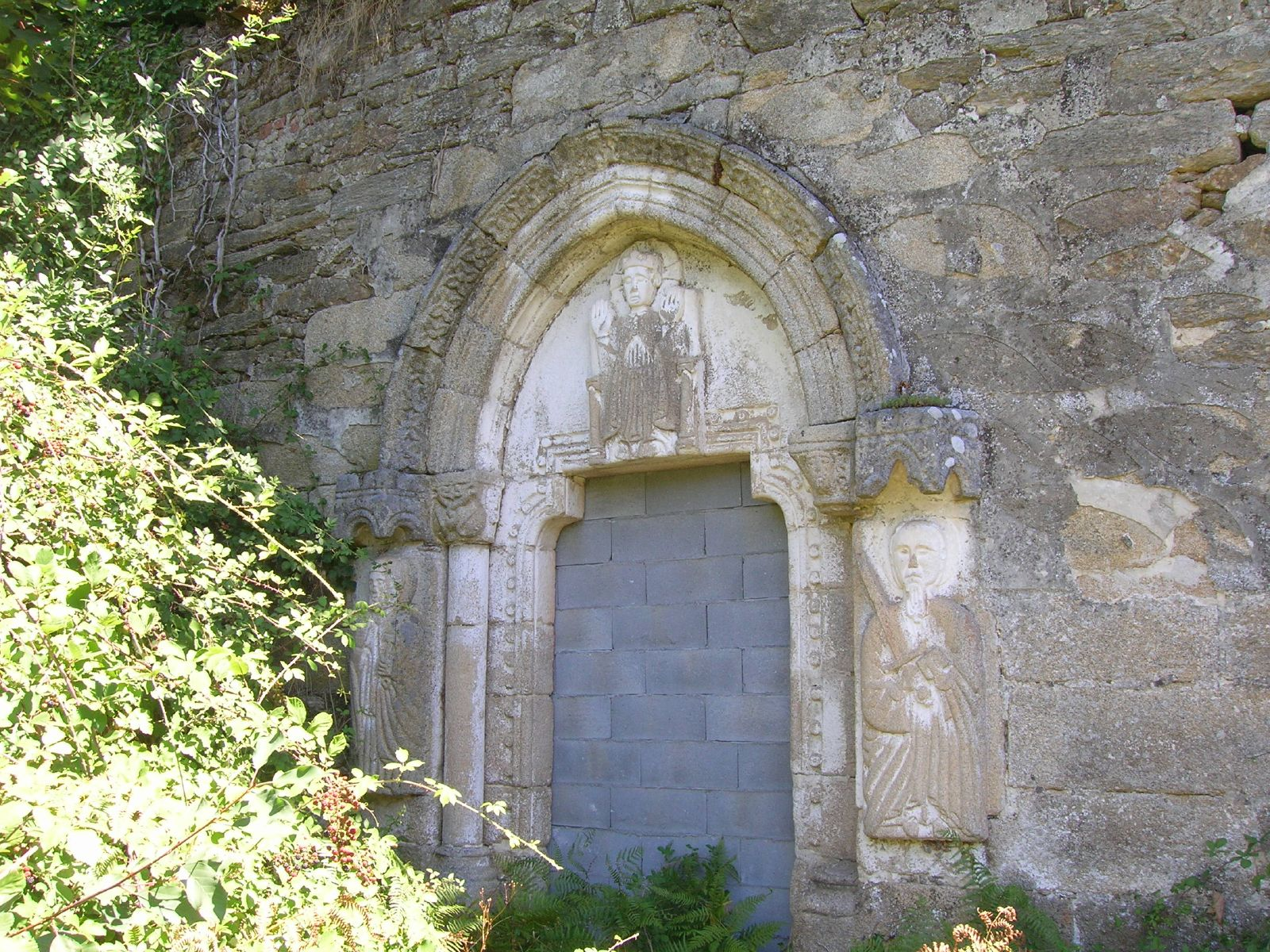
Entrance
