= Bermudo II of León =

King of León from 984 to 999

Bermudo II
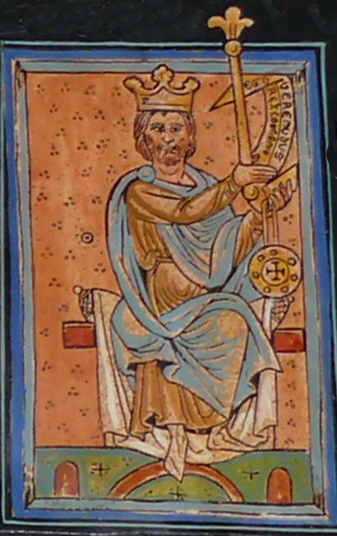
- Bermudo II in the Libro de las Estampas

King of León
- Reign: 984–999
- Predecessor: Ramiro III
- Successor: Alfonso V

King of Galicia
- Reign: 982–999
- Predecessor: Ramiro III
- Successor: Alfonso V
- Born: c. 953
- Died: c. September 999
- Burial: Monastery of Carracedo later Basilica of San Isidoro
- Consort: Velasquita Ramírez; Elvira García
- Issue more…: Cristina Teresa: Alfonso V; Illegitimate : Elvira; Pelayo; Ordoño
- Dynasty: Astur-Leonese dynasty
- Father: Ordoño III of León
- Mother: Urraca Fernández (?)
- Religion: Chalcedonian Christianity

Bermudo (or Vermudo) II (c. 953 – September 999), called the Gouty (Spanish: el Gotoso), was first a rival king in Galicia (982–984) and then king of the entire Kingdom of León (984–999). His reign is summed up by Justo Pérez de Urbel's description of him as "the poor king tormented in life by the sword of Almanzor and in death by the vengeful pen of a bishop." Pelagius of Oviedo (died 1153), half of whose Chronicon covers the reign of Bermudo, is highly critical of the king. He accuses Bermudo of imprisoning Bishop Gudesteus of Oviedo in the 990s and blames the attacks of Almanzor on Bermudo's sins.

== Reign ==
In 982, the Galician nobility proclaimed Bermudo, a son of former king Ordoño III of León, as king in opposition to his cousin Ramiro III. This usurpation is usually seen as the extension of ongoing succession crises begun in the 950s. At the time of the usurpation Bermudo II's faction was led by Gonzalo Menéndez and that of Ramiro III by Rodrigo Velázquez. Bermudo was crowned in the cathedral of Santiago de Compostela on 15 October 982. It is probable that two episcopal opponents of his coronation—Rodrigo's son Pelayo, then bishop of Santiago, and Arias Peláez, bishop of Mondoñedo—were exiled from their sees to the monasteries of Celanova and San Martín de Lalín, respectively, at this time. Because his support was limited and regional, Bermudo required the protection of the Caliphate of Córdoba. There was much unrest in Castile in his early years and the Cordoban armies of Almanzor came, not as allies, but as conquerors. Between November 991 and September 992, Vermudo was expelled from the kingdom by a revolt led by the magnates Gonzalo Vermúdez, Munio Fernández, and count Pelayo Rodríguez. He was soon restored and reconciled to the discontents. On 8 August 994, Bermudo gave the village of Veiga to the monastery of Celanova, the village having been built by Suario Gundemárez on land illegally appropriated from the monastery. Suario took refuge there during his later rebellion. On 23 August that year the village of Morella was granted to abbot Salvato of Celanova after it was confiscated because the murder of Fortún Velázquez had taken place there.

Bermudo eventually succeeded in recovering Zamora from the Muslims, but did not succeed in expelling them totally until 987. This brought on reprisals from Almanzor, who set out to destroy Coimbra. After Almanzor besieged and razed the city of León, Bermudo took refuge in Zamora. The Muslims continued their conquests, taking Astorga (996) and sacking Santiago de Compostela (997).

In 999, the gout from which he suffered was aggravated and it became impossible for him to ride a horse. Military leader of the Christians of northwestern Spain, he subsequently travelled by litter. Later that same year, he died in Villanueva del Bierzo and was buried in the Monastery of Carracedo. Later, his remains were transferred to the Basilica of San Isidoro.

== Family ==
=== Parentage ===
Both the paternal and maternal parentage of Bermudo II have been subject to scholarly debate. On the paternal side, the primary chronicle sources simply call him son of king Ordoño, without specifying which former king of that name. Traditionally his father has been identified as Ordoño III and the modern consensus agrees with this assignment, but at least one prominent modern Leonese historian, Manuel Carriedo Tejedo, has concluded that he instead was son of Ordoño IV. The question is seemingly resolved by a charter in the cartulary of Santa María de Carracedo, in which Bermudo names his father Ordoño and his grandfather Ramiro, making his father Ordoño III and not Ordoño IV, the son of Alfonso.

Controversy also exists over the identity of his mother. Traditionally, he has been viewed as son of Ordoño III's documented wife, Urraca Fernández. Bishop Pelagius relates that Bermudo was born to a second wife of Ordoño, named Elvira, but since no such queen appears in charters or any other record outside of the Bishop's account, she probably did not exist. In a royal charter dated 5 January 999, Bermudo refers to his avo (grandfather, or by extension, ancestor), the count Gonzalo Betótez of Deza. As Bermudo's traditional pedigree would provide no such relationship, Justo Pérez de Urbel suggested that he was instead an illegitimate son of Ordoño III, with the relationship coming through his mother. Based on political considerations and a second ambiguous documented kinship, he provisionally identified the mother as either Aragonta or Guntroda, daughters of Pelayo González, count of Deza, who was son of count Gonzalo. He has been followed in this by several historians, but others find the evidence lacking and retain the traditional view of his mother. The identification of Bermudo's first queen, Velasquita Ramírez, as a grandniece of count Pelayo allows the possibility that Bermudo was referring to count Gonzalo as ancestor of his wife and not his own blood ancestor, but he was already divorced from Velasquita at the time he executed the charter in question.

=== Children ===
By Velasquita Ramírez, he had:

- Cristina (married Ordoño Ramírez, son of Bermudo's rival Ramiro III)

By Elvira García (daughter of García Fernández) he had:

- Alfonso, later Alfonso V of León
- Theresa (Nun at monastery of San Pelayo, married Unknown Muslim King of Toledo)
- Sancha

He also had three bastards:

- Elvira
- Pelayo
- Ordoño (married Fronilde, daughter of the aforementioned count Pelayo Rodríguez.)

== Bibliography ==
- Barton, Simon (2000). The World of El Cid: Chronicles of the Spanish Reconquest. Manchester: Manchester University Press. ISBN 9780719052262.
- Carriedo Tejedo, Manuel (1981). "La Version de la "Historia Silense" Sobre la Filiacion de Vermudo II"". Tierras de León (in Spanish). 21 (44): 38–44. ISSN 0495-5773.
- Escudero Manzano, Gonzalo J. (2024). "La insubordinación a la autoridad central y los mecanismos regios de contención durante el reino astur-leonés (siglos VIII-XI)". En la España Medieval (in Spanish) (47): 171–188. doi:10.5209/elem.94756. hdl:20.500.14352/104133. ISSN 0214-3038.
- García Álvarez, Manuel R. (1960). "¿La Reina Velasquita, nieta de Muniadomna Díaz?" (PDF). Revista de Guimarães (in Spanish) (70): 197–230. Archived from the original on 2013-10-06.
- Martín Rodríguez, José-Luis (1965). "Pelayo Rodríguez, obispo de Santiago (977–985)". Anuario de Estudios Medievales (in Spanish) (2): 467–475.
- Palomeque Torres, Antonio (1948). "Episcopologio de la Sede de Oviedo durante el siglo X". Hispania Sacra (in Spanish). 1 (2): 269–298.
- Pérez de Urbel, Justo (1949). "Los Padres de Vermudo II el Gotoso". Revista de Archivos, Biblotecas y Museos (in Spanish) (55): 289–307.
- Ruiz Asencio, José Manuel (1968). "Campañas de Almanzor contra el reino de León (981–986)". Anuario de Estudios Medievales (in Spanish) (5): 31–74.
- Sáez Sánchez, Emilio (1946). "Notas al episcopologio minduniense del siglo X". Hispania (in Spanish) (22): 3–79.
- Salazar y Acha, Jaime de (2013). "Reflexiones e hipótesis sobre algunas incógnitas genealógicas de la antigua dinastía astureonesa". Boletín de la Real Academia de la Historia (in Spanish). 210 (2): 275–296.

Bermudo II of León Born: c. 953 Died: 999
Preceded by Ramiro III	King of Galicia; 982–999	Succeeded by Alfonso V
Preceded by Ramiro III	King of León; 984–999	Succeeded by Alfonso V
