= Rodrigo Álvarez de las Asturias =

Spanish nobleman

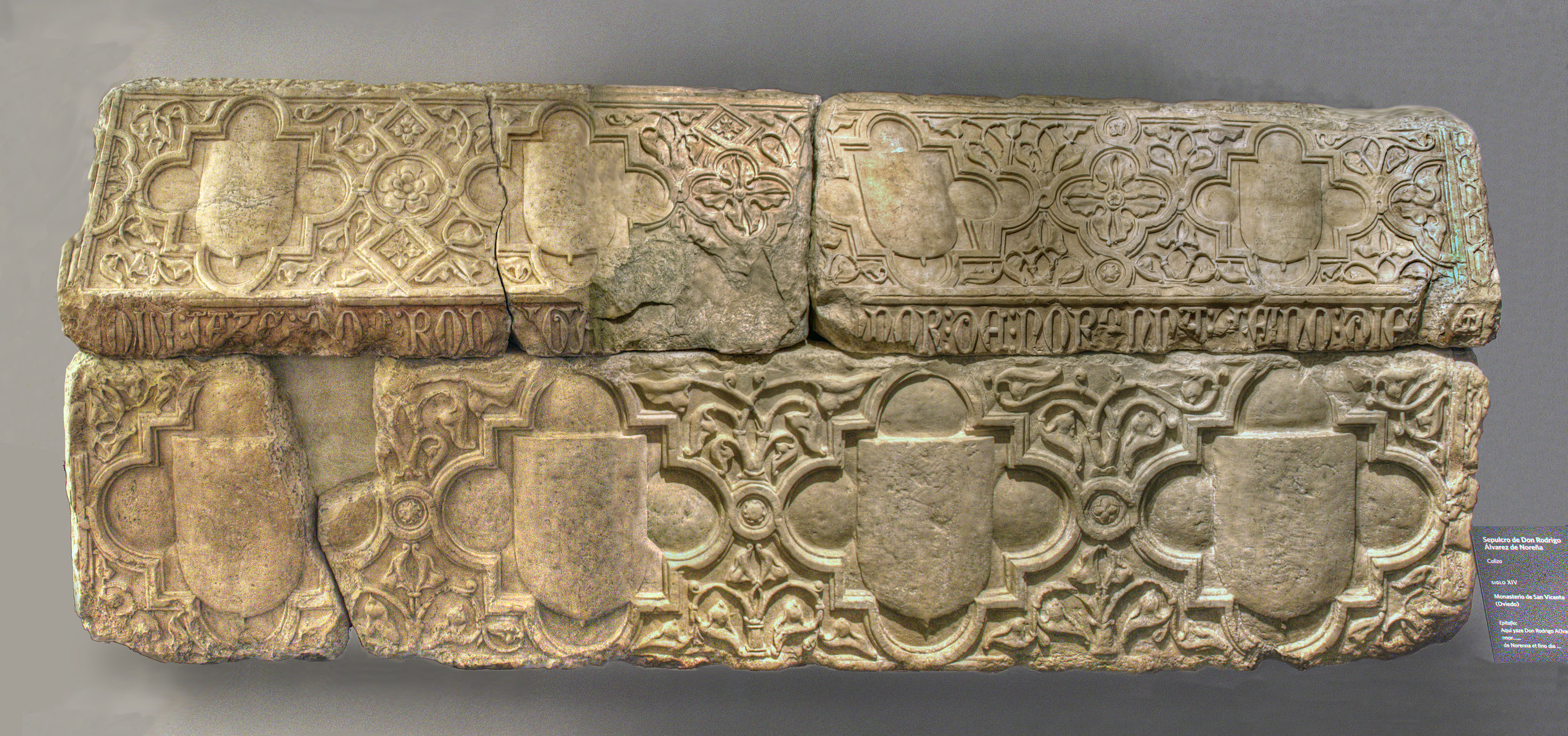
The Tomb of Rodrigo Alvarez de Asturias

Rodrigo Álvarez de Asturias (died 1334) was a Spanish nobleman and lord of Noreña, Gijón, and County of Trastámara. He was the son of another Rodrigo Alvarez de Asturias and grandson of Pedro Álvarez de Asturias. He married Juana Fernandez de Saldana daughter of Fernando Rodriguez de Saldana. He had two children including Rodrigo Álvarez de Asturias II.
