= Gonzalo Peláez =

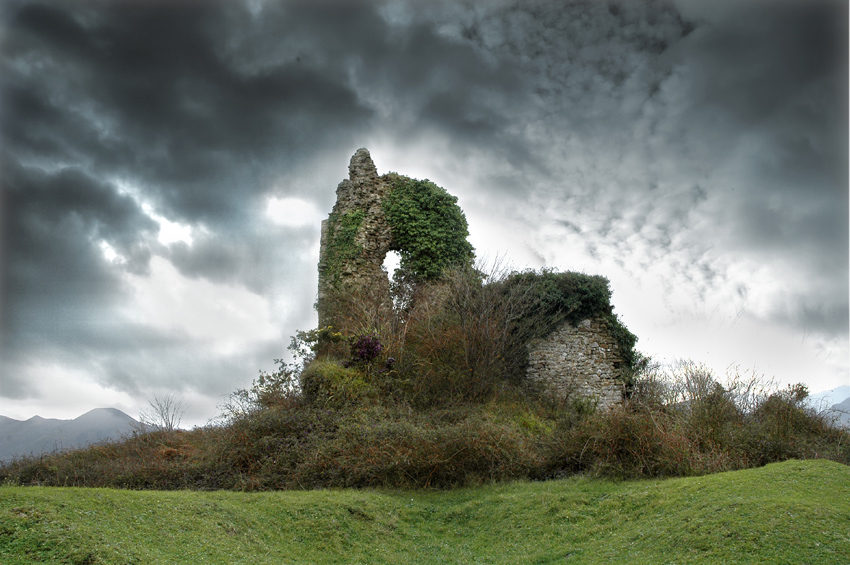
The ruins of the castle of Tudela, where Gonzalo first entrenched himself when opposed by the king's forces.

Gonzalo Peláez (died March 1138) was the ruler of the Asturias from 1110 to 1132, during the reigns of Queen Urraca (1109–26) and her son, Alfonso VII (1126–57). He held high military posts under the latter, but in 1132 he began a five-year rebellion against Alfonso, punctuated by three brief reconciliations. He died in exile in Portugal.

Of uncertain origins, Gonzalo may have been the son of Pelayo Peláez and Mumadonna (Mayor) González. The only link is a charter of 1097 by which a certain Mummadonna cognomento domna Maiore Gundesaluiz ("Mumadonna called lady Mayor González") made a donation to the Diocese of Oviedo for the good of her soul and that of her husband, Pelayo Peláez, making reference to their son named Gonzalo. On 18 November 1118 a Gonzalo Peláez, perhaps not the same man, received lands in the Araduey valley in the province of León from Queen Urraca along with his wife Mayor Muñoz. If it is the same man he may have been Leonese rather than Asturian, as usually assumed.

== Rule in the Asturias ==
Gonzalo first appears in the record in 1095, but without a noble title. By July 1110 he had received the tenencia of Asturias de Oviedo, which he held until April 1132. There is no reference to a count of Asturias after 1106, and Gonzalo was unrelated to the previous counts. He was a new man, not belonging to the high nobility and owing his rise to the king's favour. Rather than appoint a count after 1106, Alfonso preferred to appoint a castellan whose function would be primarily military, with other administrative functions left to Bishop Pelagius of Oviedo. Gonzalo and the bishop managed to get along: on 1 February 1113 Pelagius gave Gonzalo half of the town of Almunia de Candamo.

In light of his unusual position, Gonzalo was referred to in various ways in contemporary documents. In the earliest reference to his castellany, he was just cited as Gonzalo in Oveto, in Oviedo. By June 1113 he was dominante Asturias (lording it over Asturias), and in a document of December he was described as caput terra (head of the land). In May 1120 he was referred to as regnante Asturias (ruling Asturias) and Asturias presidente (presiding in Asturias), but his most common designation (after 1123 at least) was potestas in Asturias (the power in Asturias). Starting in 1115 Urraca appears to have limited Gonzalo's power. That year a certain Gonzalo Sánchez was made castellan at Tineo in the western Asturias. Between 1120 and 1125 Suero Vermúdez appears as count in Tineo, and he also held Luna to the south, in León, thus controlling the passes of the Cordillera Cantábrica connecting the two provinces. As early as 1114 Suero was sharing jurisdiction in a lawsuit argued before Pelagius and Gonzalo.

The Chronica Adefonsi imperatoris names "Count Gonzalo Peláez" as one of those magnates who pledged fealty to Alfonso VII upon his succession in 1126, but this seems an error, as Gonzalo did not receive the comital title until February 1130, perhaps extorted from the king in a time of emergency. The Chronica goes on to describe him as the "governor of Asturias [who] allied himself with the King, and was appointed Consul in charge of all military outposts in Asturias". In 1129 Alfonso VII sent Gonzalo, whom the Chronica describes as "Duke of Asturias", and Suero Vermúdez to negotiate with Alfonso I of Aragon and Navarre at Almazán. He served as alférez between November 1131 (possibly as early as July) and March 1132. He was then at the height of his power. The Chronica Adefonsi accuses him of not sufficiently or wholeheartedly aiding the king in the defence of the frontier against Alfonso of Aragon, and of openly defying Queen Urraca "after she had honored him." One modern historian, however, attributes Gonzalo's rise from obscurity to "almost total power in Asturias" to his faithfulness to Urraca during the civil wars of the first half of her reign.

== Rebellions ==
=== First rebellion ===
In 1132, for reasons unknown, but perhaps connected to the revolt of the Lara family in Castile in 1130, Gonzalo rebelled against Alfonso. He was supported by his relative, a minor local nobleman, Rodrigo Gómez, but he did not have the support of the bishop Alfonso of Oviedo. The king diverted an army he had assembled at Atienza to campaign against Aragon to the Asturias, to campaign against Gonzalo. Rodrigo Gómez was seized, stripped of his lands and titles, and "sent away". When Gonzalo retreated before the royal army's approach, many of his knights were captured. Alfonso had them "kept under guard at the rear". He captured the castle of Gozón and those nearest it, but he was unable to take the fortress of Tudela where Gonzalo had shut himself in. When Gonzalo realised how many of his knights had been captured he negotiated a year-long truce (a "mutual covenant of peace" in the words of the Chronica). Tudela was handed over, but Gonzalo retained his hold on the castles of Proaza, Buanga, and Alba de Quirós, "all very strong fortresses" according to the Chronica.

=== Second rebellion ===
In 1133 Alfonso went to Oviedo and demanded the surrender of the castles. Gonzalo refused and prepared to fight at Proaza. The Chronica reports that "he had killed the horse the King was riding, along with several men." Again unable to suppress the rebellion, Alfonso left troops under the command of Suero Vermúdez and Pedro Alfonso, who had the help of "all of the Asturians", though what the chronicler means by this last phrase is unclear. Suero first attacked Buanga and Pedro Alba de Quirós, although Gonzalo was then at Proaza. The royal forces tightened the encirclement of Gonzalo's strongholds. Ambushes were prepared on all roads leading to his castles and over the mountains. The Chronica records that "whomever they caught, they sent away with his hands cut off," which "was done for several days".

The uprising, still ongoing, is mentioned in a royal charter of May 1134 (Gundinsalvo comite in rebellione posito in castro buanga samna). In the spring of 1135 Gonzalo made peace with the king through his negotiators, Suero, Pedro, and Bishop Arias of León. According to the Chronica Adefonsi, Gonzalo threw himself at Alfonso's feet, admitted his guilt, and begged for forgiveness, which he received. Gonzalo was stayed at the royal palace for several days receiving highest honours. All this was undoubtedly the public ceremony, designed to safeguard the king's reputation, but in the negotiations Gonzalo had agreed to relinquish his three castles only on the condition that he receive the tenencia of Luna, which had formerly belonged to Suero Vermúdez. To this Alfonso agreed, on the advice of his counsellors, who included his sister Sancha Raimúndez and his wife Berengaria.

=== Third rebellion ===
Gonzalo undersigned four documents on 26 May 1135, and participated in the business of the royal court a week later (2 June). This reconciliation—made just in time for Alfonso's coronation as Imperator Hispaniae—appears to have quickly failed, for in July 1135 Alfonso awarded the property of Gonzalo Peláez to Rodrigo Martínez and Rodrigo González de Lara, and a royal document of December 1135 records that Gonzalo was then in open revolt in Buanga. The next spring the king and Gonzalo again reconciled, and the latter was with the court at Sahagún throughout March 1136.

=== Last rebellion, exile and death ===
Gonzalo remained with the court and on good terms with the king until at least late October, when the court was at Palencia. He is not, however, cited as tenente (holding) Luna in any surviving documents, and the king may not have fulfilled his part of the accord, though the Chronica says that he ordered Luna turned over to him "in order to avoid any further rebellion." By early 1137 Gonzalo was in revolt, but this time he was arrested by Pedro Alfonso and imprisoned in the castle of Aguilar. The king ordered him released and banished, setting a specific day on which he was to go into exile. Gonzalo complied. By October he had taken up residence in Portugal at the court of Afonso Henriques, accompanied by his household knights. He may have been plotting to harass Alfonso from there. The Chronica records that he intended to "wage war by sea" against both Galicia and the Asturias, which had the support of Afonso, who treated him with honour and promised to reward him with high office.

Gonzalo never did, for he died—Deo disponente ("God disposing") in the words of the Chronica—in March the next year (1138). The author of the Chronica, an obvious partisan of Alfonso VII, notes caustically that he "caught a fever and died an exile in a foreign land." His knights bore his body back to Oviedo for burial, as the king permitted. In 1143 his surviving sister, Cristina Peláez, and her husband, Gonzalo Vermúdez, made a grant to the church of Oviedo for the sake of his soul.

== Bibliography ==
Primary sources

- Lipskey, Glenn Edward. The Chronicle of Alfonso the Emperor: A Translation of the Chronica Adefonsi imperatoris. PhD dissertation, Northwestern University. 1972. Cited as CAI in the notes.

Secondary literature

- Barton, Simon. The Aristocracy in Twelfth-century León and Castile. Cambridge: Cambridge University Press, 1997.
- Calleja Puerta, Miguel. "Nacimiento de la frontera: el destierro portugués del conde asturiano Gonzalo Peláez." Revista da Faculdade de Letras: Historia, 15:1(1998), 213–228.
- Calleja Puerta, Miguel. "El destierro del conde Gonzalo Peláez: aportación a la historia política de los reinos cristianos peninsulares del siglo XII." Cuadernos de historia de España, 76(2000):17–36.
- Fernández Conde, Francisco Javier. "Singularidá d'Asturies na Edá Media." Lletres asturianes: Boletín Oficial de l'Academia de la Llingua Asturiana, 100(2009):127–140. Abstract.
- Fletcher, Richard A. The Episcopate in the Kingdom of León in the Twelfth Century. Oxford: Oxford University Press, 1978.
- Floriano Cumbreño, Antonio C. Estudios de Historia de Asturias. Oviedo: 1962. See especially pp. 153–169.
- García García, M. Elida. "El conde asturiano Gonzalo Peláez." Asturiensia medievalia, 2(1975):39–64.
- Reilly, Bernard F. The Kingdom of León-Castilla under Queen Urraca, 1109–1126. Princeton: Princeton University Press, 1982.
- Reilly, Bernard F. The Kingdom of León-Castilla under King Alfonso VII, 1126–1157. Philadelphia: University of Pennsylvania Press, 1998.
