= Monasterio de San Salvador (Celorio) =

Monastery in Asturias, Spain

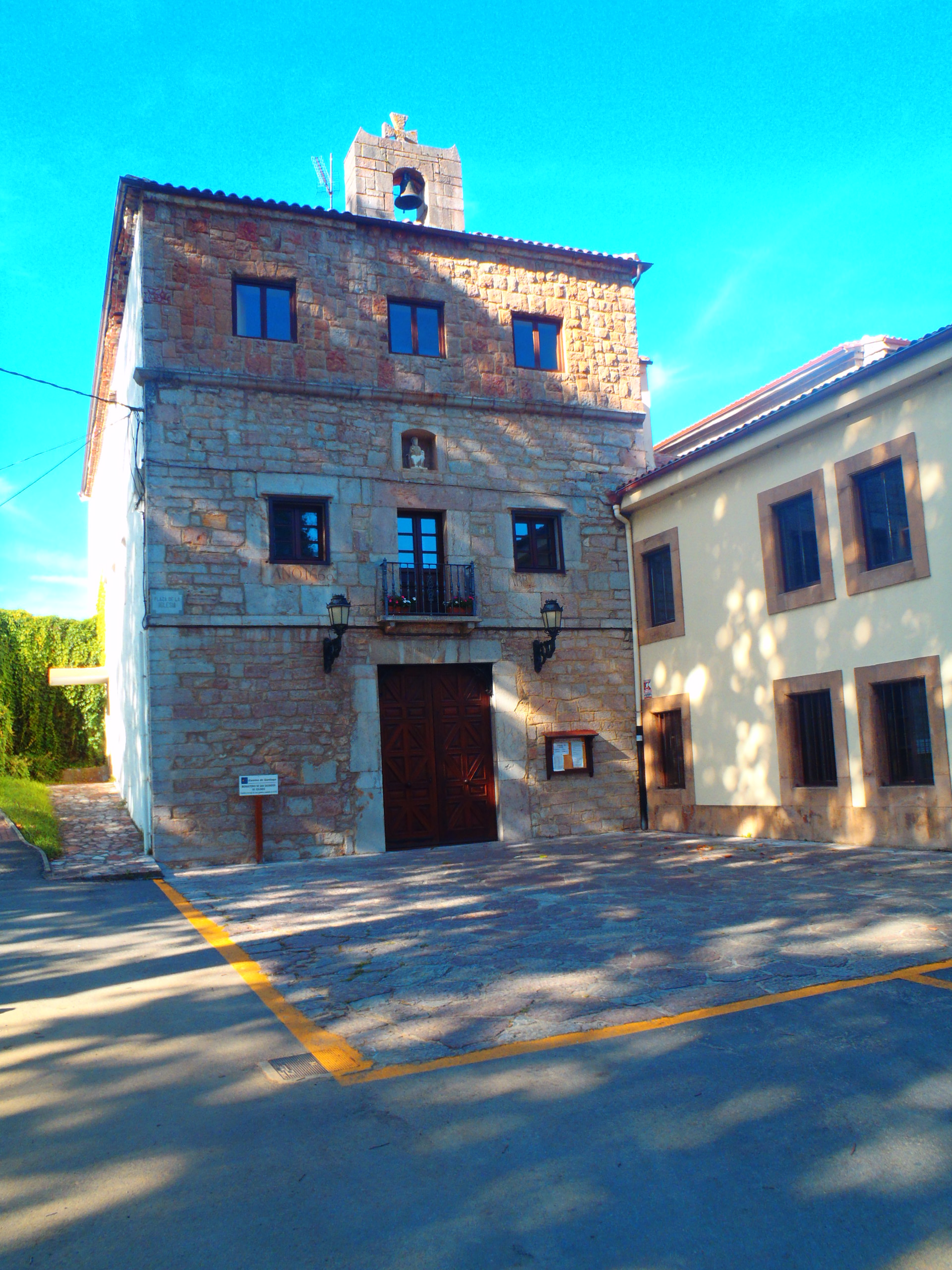
Church of monastery

Monasterio de San Salvador (Celorio) is a monastery in Asturias, Spain.
