= Cornellana =

Coordinates: 43.416667°N 6.15°W

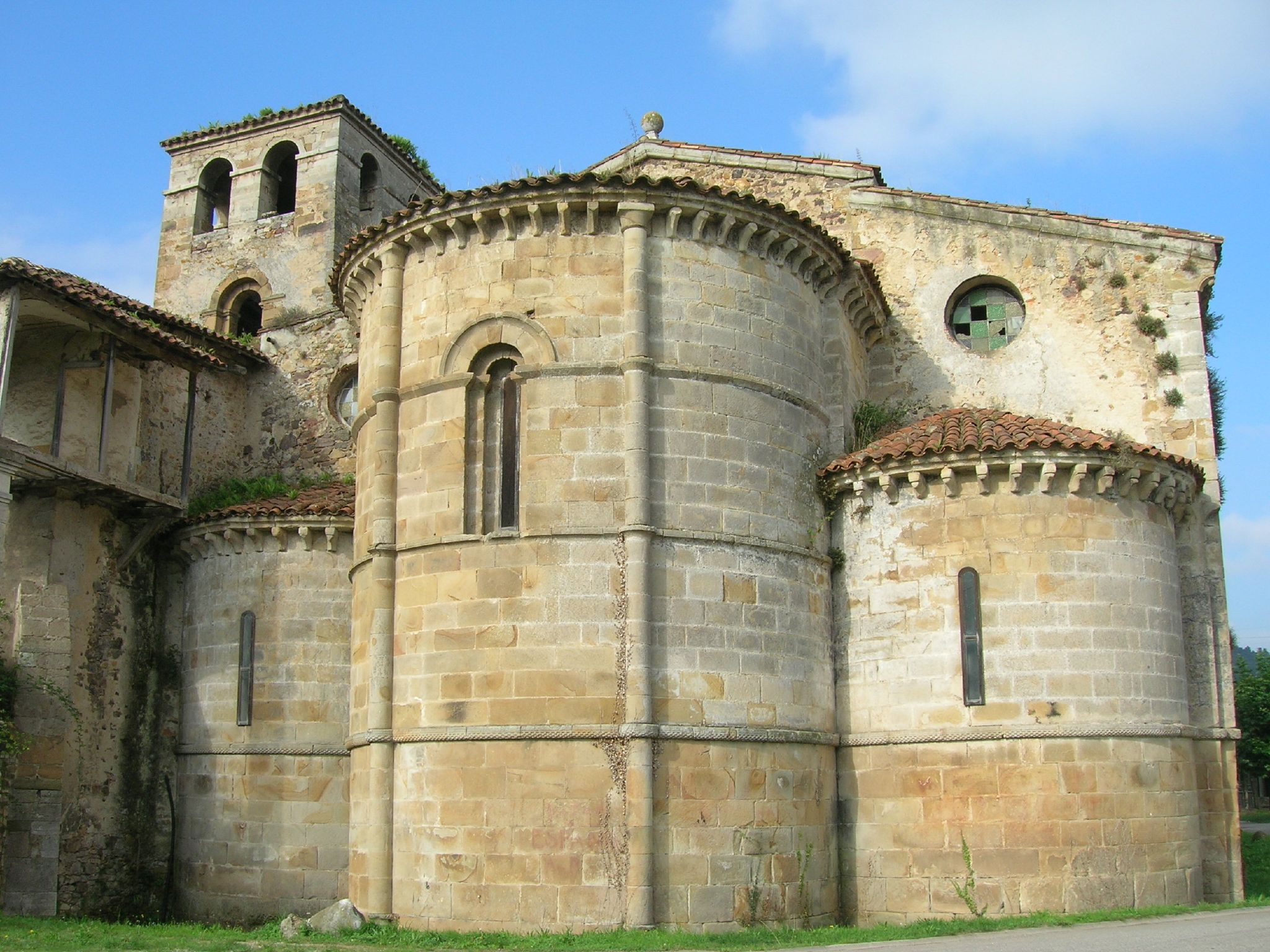
The monastery of San Salvador, Cornellana

Cornellana (Asturian Corniana or Curniana and officially Cornellana/Corniana) is one of 28 parishes (administrative divisions) in Salas, a municipality within the province and autonomous community of Asturias, in northern Spain.

It is 10.12 km^{2} (3.91 sq mi) in size, with a population of 796. It is located on the Camino Primitivo path of the Camino de Santiago.

== Villages ==
- Candalunegru
- Cornellana/Corniana
- Faxas
- Folgueirinas
- Freisnéu
- La Pesquera
- La Reguera
- La Veiga
- Las Nisales
- Quintoños
- Rondeiru
- Santa Ufemia
- Santueña
- Suburriba
- Los Verdugos
