= Monastery of Saint Pelagius =

Monastery in Oviedo, Asturias, Spain

Coordinates: 43°21′48.23″N 5°50′33.79″W

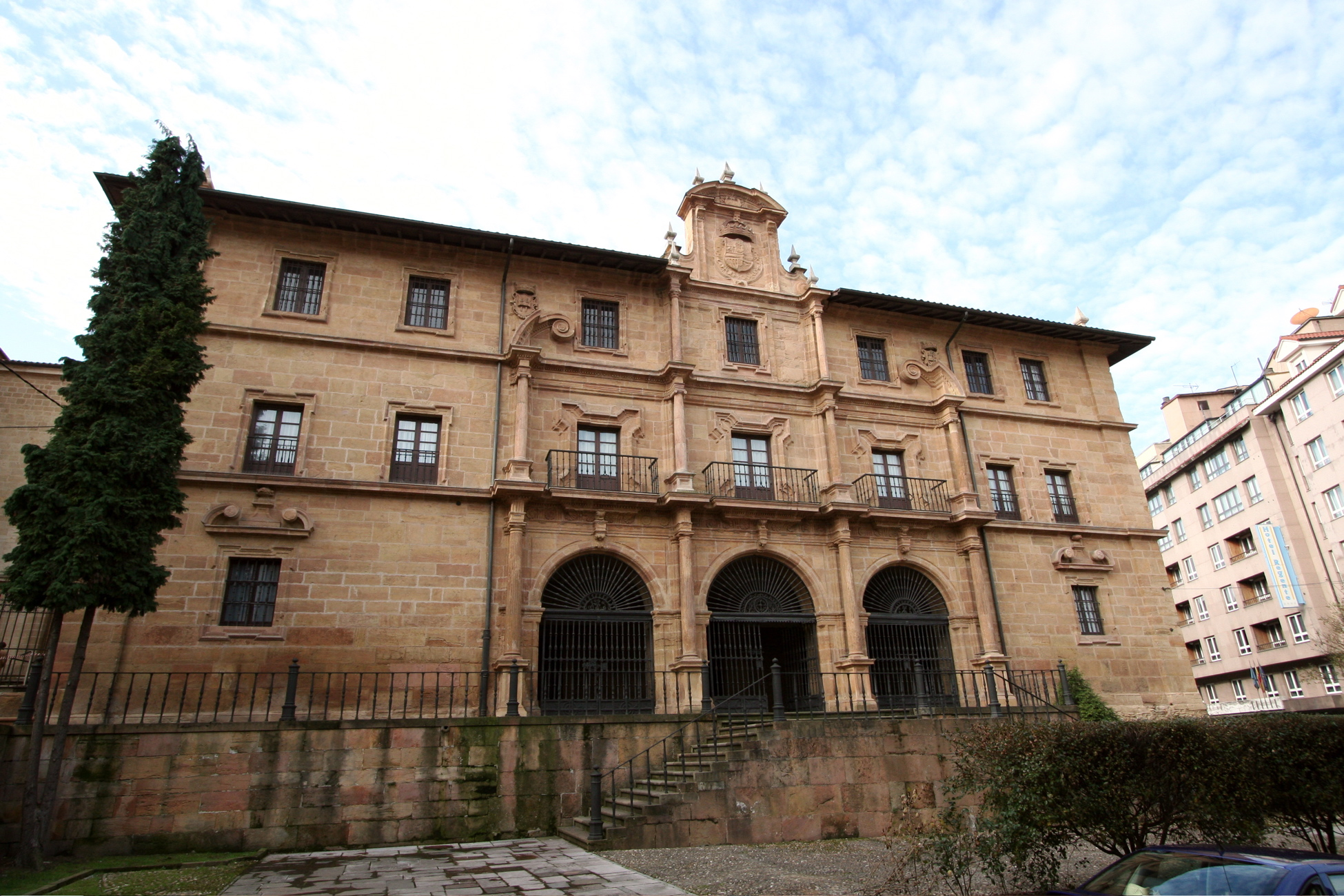
Monastery of Saint Pelagius

The Monastery of Saint Pelagius (Asturian: Monesteriu de San Pelayu; Spanish: Monasterio de San Pelayo) is a Benedictine convent for women in the city of Oviedo in Spain.

The monastery was founded by King Alfonso II of Asturias (r. 791–842) and was initially dedicated to John the Baptist. It was only rededicated to Saint Pelagius after it came to acquire his supposed relics in 994.

The monastery stands near the cathedral of Oviedo. It was mostly remodeled after the 16th century, losing most of its original Romanesque elements.
