= Gonzalo Menéndez =

10th-century count of Portugal

- Magnus Dux Portucalensium

Count of Portucale
- Tenure: c. 950-997
- Predecessor: Hermenegildo González and Mumadona Dias
- Successor: Menendo González
- Died: 997
- Spouses: Ilduara Peláez; Hermesinda
- Issue: Menendo González
- Father: Hermenegildo González
- Mother: Mumadona Dias

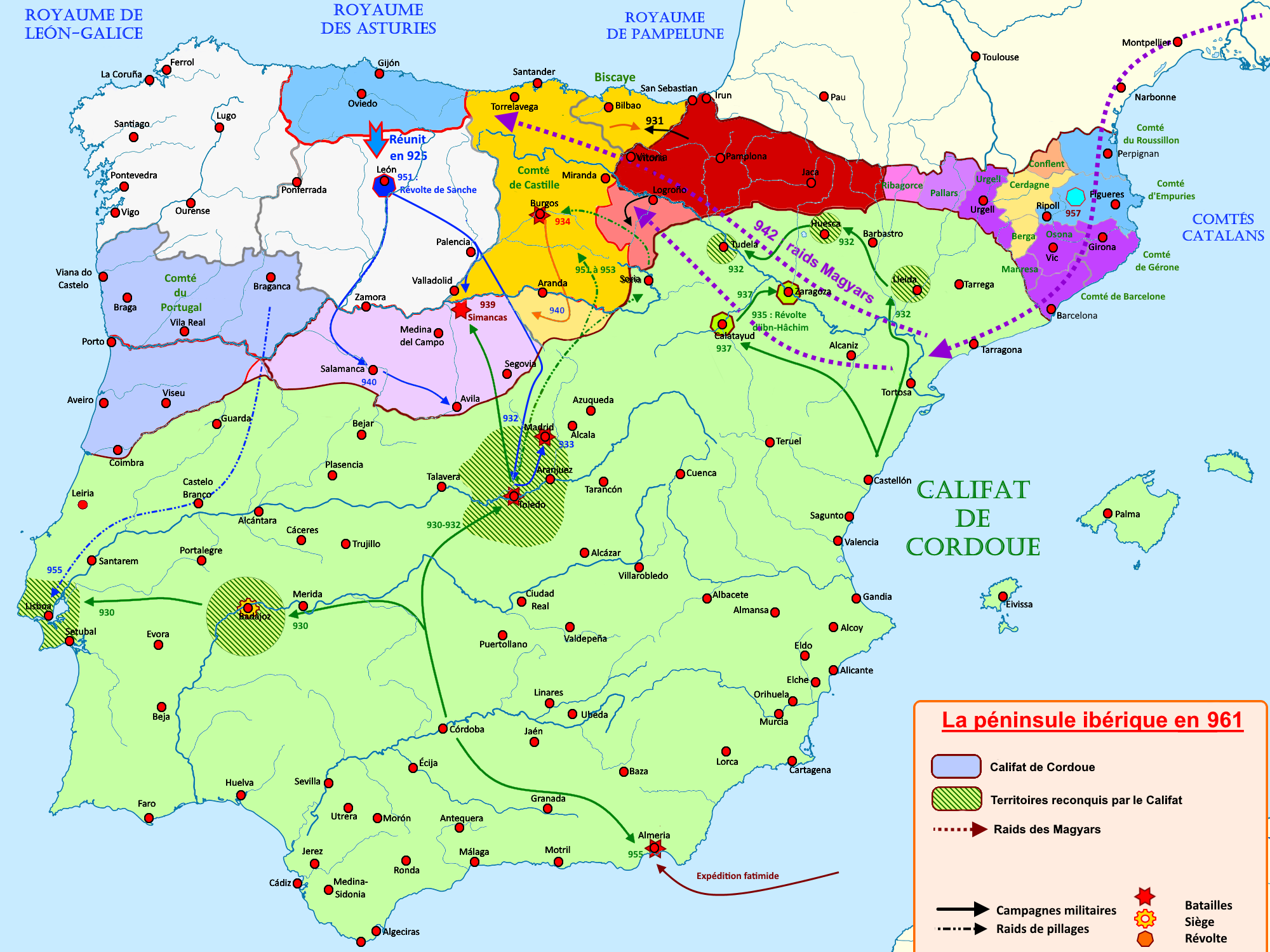
Iberian Peninsula in 961 showing the County of Portugal

Gonzalo Menéndez (or Gonçalo Mendes) (fl. 950–997) was a Count of Portugal in the Kingdom of León. He regularly carries the title count (comes), the highest in the kingdom, in surviving documents. He may have used the title magnus dux portucalensium ("great duke of the Portuguese"). His name in contemporary records is usually spelled Gundisaluus Menendiz.

Gonzalo was a son of count Hermenegildo González and Mumadona Dias, and named for his grandfather, count Gonçalo Betotes. His father was dead by 950, when his widow distributed some of his lands. In the pertinent document Gonzalo is mentioned for the first time (24 July 950).

== Life ==
=== Opposition to Sancho I and Ramiro III ===
In 966, Gonzalo assassinated Sancho I of León. He invited him to a banquet and fed him poisoned food, an apple according to some sources. In the late 960s Gonzalo's lands came under the ravages of the Vikings. In 968, he fell out with king Ramiro III after the latter refused to fight them. In the factional and successional politics of the time, Gonzalo may be said to have favoured the line of Ordoño III and his son Vermudo II over Sancho I and his son Ramiro III.

=== Aristocratic quarrels ===
A dispute between Gonzalo's mother, abbess of Guimarães in her widowhood, and a relative of the Galician magnate Rodrigo Velásquez, spurred a rivalry between the two families that would span several years. Rodrigo's brother's sister-in-law, Guntroda, abbess of Pazóo, had appropriated the monastery of Santa Comba, which belonged to a monk name Odoino, who appealed to Mummadomna for support. She sent her sons Gonzalo and Ramiro to force Guntroda to return it volens nolens (willing or not). The conflict left to open warfare between the factions led by Gonzalo and Rodrigo. In 968 or perhaps 974, Gonzalo defeated his rival in the Battle of Aguioncha.

Justo Pérez de Urbel argued that the absence of Rodrigo and Gonzalo from court during the regency of queen Elvira Ramírez was evidence that during this period they were de facto independent, but they were in León on 20 September 968 for the confirmation of a noble gift to the abbey of Sobrado.

=== Rebellion in favour of Vermudo II ===
In 981, after the Christian defeat at the Battle of Rueda, he led the rebellion against Ramiro III that installed the king's cousin Ordoño Bermúdez, perhaps Gonzalo's nephew, on the throne. Gonzalo was soon joined by his son Menendo González, and by Tedón Aldretiz, Tello Eloritiz, Gutier Díaz, Rodrigo Sarracínez, Gonzalo Álvarez, and Gonzalo Díaz. Among the bishops to support the revolt were Viliulfo of Coimbra, Ikilano of Viseu, and James of Lamego. The first document which titles Vermudo "king" (Vermudus rex, prolix domni Ordoni) is a donation to the monastery of Lorvão of the fourth part of the villages of Palos and Lamas made by Gonzalo on 22 December that year. Vermudo had signed a document with his cousin on 11 October, and the success of the rebellion must have come after that date. Gonzalo is sometimes credited with chasing Pelayo Rodríguez, the son of his old enemy Rodrigo Velázquez, from the diocese of Iria Flavia in the fall of 982, for Vermudo's coronation.

In 985 Gonzalo—and many other Portuguese magnates—had begun to employ the title duke (dux); Gonzalo is usually listed on documents ahead of all of them. In 994 he was granted the city and territory of Braga. He was killed in 997 during Almanzor's campaign against Santiago de Compostela.

== Possible embassy to Córdoba ==
On 12 August (16 Shawwal) 971, according to the al-Muqtabis, the Caliph of Córdoba, al-Hakam II, received six separate Christian embassies in his palace of al-Zahra. From Sancho Garcés II of Pamplona, "prince of the Bascones", he received the abbot Bassal (Basilio) and Velasco, a judge of Nájera. From Elvira Ramírez came her envoy al-Layt and the Córdoban arif Abd al-Malik, who had been at her court. From Fernando Flaínez, count of Salmántica, the caliph received the ambassadors Habib Tawila and Saada. From Garci-Fernández, Count of Castile and Álava, arrived one García, son perhaps of a certain Gatón. Then came Esimeno (Jimeno) and Elgas from Fernando Ansúrez, the count of Monzón, Peñafiel, and Campos, and finally the ambassadors of a certain count Gundisalb: Sulayman and Jalaf ibn Sad. This last may have been either Gonzalo Menéndez or Gonzalo Muñoz, Count of Coimbra.

== Marriage and issue ==
Sometime before 964, Gonzalo married Ilduara (Ildonza) Peláez, his first cousin, the daughter of his father's brother, Paio Gonçalves, Count of Deza, by the latter's wife, Hermesenda Gutiérrez, daughter of Count Gutier Menéndez and sister of Saint Rudesind. She is first mentioned, though not as his wife, in 961. She was dead by 983, for in that year he appears married to a Hermesinda (Ermesenda). She was still living in 1008. All of Gonzalo's six children came by his first wife. His eldest sons, Ramiro (living 986) and Rosendo (living 1014), played little part in politics compared to his third son, the aforementioned Menendo. Besides these he had a younger son, Diego, and two daughters: Toda, who married the alférez Rodrigo Ordóñez, and Mumadona (Muniadomna), who was dead by 1013.

== Notes ==
Preceded by Mumadona Dias with Hermenegildo González	Count of Portugal; 950–999	Succeeded by Menendo González
