= Rodrigo Velázquez =

Spanish aristocrat

Rodrigo Velázquez (Note: Among the ways his name appears in contemporary Latin are Rudericus Uelasconius and Rudericus prolis Uelasconi.) (died 977/78) was an important magnate of Galicia during the reigns of Ramiro II, Ordoño III, Sancho I, and Ramiro III. He used the title dux (duke), the highest in Galicia at the time, and he even treated diplomatically with the Caliphate of Córdoba. He has been implicated in factional fighting over the succession to the Leonese throne, but the major battle of his career was part of a private aristocratic feud.

== Family ==
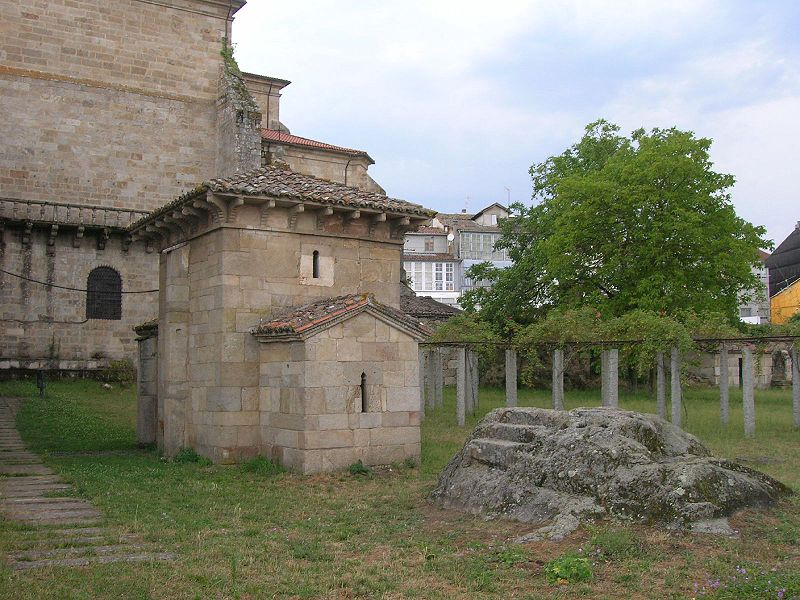
The chapel of San Miguel at Celanova dates from 942. The monastery was heavily patronised by Rodrigo and his family.

Rodrigo was the son of count Velasco Rodríguez (Uelasco Ruderiz) and his wife countess Trudilde (Trudildi). There is a notice in the monastery of Celanova, dated 8 October 950, of the delimitation of the village of Santa María de Verín, which was owned at that time by the widowed Trudilde.

Rodrigo's first wife was Adosinda Gunterícez, daughter of Gunterico Arianiz and Gontrodo (Gunterota) González. She was the mother of all his (known) children: their daughters Oneca (fl. 978), Trudilde (fl. 963–88), Velasquita (fl 978–97), (Note: Married Munio Godestéiz (fl. 943–86) and left a son, Teobaldo.) Muniadomna (fl. 978–99), and Ildonza (fl. 978–1019), and their only son, Pelayo Rodríguez. His second wife was Onega Lucídez (Honega prolis Lucidi), daughter of Lucidio Aloítez and Jimena. They were married by 974, when she is referred to in a charter as coniux Ruderici ducis (wife of duke Rodrigo). In 985 she made a donation to the monastery of Lorvão. Her last known act (9 June 999) was a donation to the monastery of Celanova on behalf of the soul of bone memorie vir meus ... Rudericus Uelasquiz comite ("my man of good memory ... count Rodrigo Velázquez").

== Life ==
On 13 June 950, by which time his father had probably died, Rodrigo confirmed an accord between Rosendo, bishop of Iria (later Compostela), and the inhabitants of Villaza, defining the boundary between the bishopric and the village. In the list of witnesses appears as third of four in a list that includes three infantes (royal princes): Hordonius prolis regis (Ordoño III), Sancius prolis regis (Sancho I), and Hordonius prolis domni Adefonsi regis (Ordoño IV). On 28 March 959, Rodrigo confirmed a donation of Sancho I to the monastery of Celanova.

Rodrigo is usually credited as one of the leaders of the party that supported Sancho I and his son Ramiro III in the wars over the Leonese succession that began in the late 950s and continued into the 980s. The chief rival clan was led by Gonzalo Menéndez, who supported first Ordoño III and later his son Vermudo II. This thesis, however, is disputed. Rodrigo appears three times in the diplomas of Ordoño III: on 27 January and 16 September 954 and 10 May 955. There is no record of Rodrigo between 956 and 958. He figures in four of the diplomas of Sancho I: those of 28 March and 1 of December 959 and 26 April and December 960. During the reign of Ramiro III Rodrigo witnessed the royal restoration of the diocese of Simancas in 974 and the testament of Rosendo in 977, which the king also witnessed. The absence of Rodrigo from court for a total of six years during the reigns of Sancho I and Ramiro III, and his comparatively frequent recurrence in the diplomas of Ordoño III, does not support the hypothesis that he was a creature of the former.

The rivalry between the two families had more to do with a dispute between Gonzalo's mother, Mummadomna, abbess of Guimarães, and a relative of Rodrigo's, Guntroda, abbess of Pazóo. (Note: Guntroda was a sister-in-law of Rodrigo's brother, Ordoño Velázquez, married to Ermesenda Gutiérrez, both being daughters of Count Gutierre Osorio and his wife Aldonza Menéndez.) It may have been in 966 or 967, during the regency of Elvira Ramírez, that Rodrigo was defeated by Gonzalo at the Battle of Aguiuncias. By September 968 the two were reconciled. Justo Pérez de Urbel argued that the absence of Rodrigo and Gonzalo from court during the regency of Elvira was evidence that during this period they were de facto independent, but they were in León on 20 September 968 for the confirmation of a noble gift to Sobrado Abbey. On the other hand, the battle may have taken place between 970 and 974, after Gonzalo had fallen out with Ramiro III. The resulting bad blood between the families is alluded to as late as 1 October 982.

In 973 Rodrigo joined with King Sancho II of Pamplona, Count Fernando Ansúrez II of Monzón and the Leonese family of the Beni Gómez in sending ambassadors to the court of the caliph, al-Ḥakam II, where they arrived on 23 September. They provided reports on Viking activity and also gave tribute and pledges of peace to the caliph. Rodrigo's embassy was apparently the last to receive an audience. According to the Muslim historian Ibn Khaldun, it was led by "the mother of Luzrik ibn Bilakis [Rodrigo Velázquez], the count whose domains were found in the environs of Galicia and who was the greatest of the counts [of that region]." Trudilde was well-received and al-Ḥakam II "accorded peace to her son, as she had asked." The caliph sent her home with expensive gifts.

Rodrigo held property in the land of Castella, where, on 20 March 974, he exchanged property with abbot Peter of San Paio de Antealtares in the village of Sandulces. (Note: The words of the charter: Rudericus dux condam proliz Uelasconi ... cum meos fratres ... la vila de Sandulces ... en tierra de Castella ("Rodrigo duke and son of Velasco ... with my brothers ... the village of Sandulces ... in the land of Castile").)

In 977 Rodrigo's only son, Pelayo Rodríguez, was elected bishop of Iria, probably through the influence of the secular nobility. On 17 January 977, Rodrigo confirmed a charter by which Rosendo, then bishop of Iria, conceded the monastery of Celanova to Pelayo and recognised him as his successor. Rodrigo died between 16 June 977, the last date he is known to have been living, when he witnessed a donation of Ramiro III to the monastery of Sahagún, and 23 October 978, the first date he is known to be dead, when his widow and his children donated the village of Paredes to the monastery of Celanova, as Rodrigo had intended.

== Legends ==
In 985 Rodrigo's son Pelayo was expelled from the see of Iria by Vermudo II. According to the early twelfth-century Historia Compostelana: "Rodrigo Velázquez, father of the expelled bishop, united with other counts of this region [Galicia] introduced there the Saracens led by al-Manṣūr; who, entering in Compostela, destroyed to the foundations the greater part of the walls of the Church of the Holy Apostle, save his most holy altar." (Note: Latin: Interea Rudericus Velasquí et pater prefati episcopi cum ceteris consulibus huius terre Sarracenos cum duce eorum Almezor in pailes islas duxit. Qui Compostellam venientes maiorem partem patietum beati Iacobi ecclesie preter elus sanctissimum aftare penitus destruxerunt Spanish: Rodrigo Velázquez, padre del obipso expulsado, unido a otros condes de esta región introdujo acá a los sarracenos acaudillados por Almanzor; los cuales entrando en Compostela, destruyeron hasta los cimientos la mayor parte de las paredes de la Iglesia del Santo Apóstol, excepto su santísimo altar.) Thus, according to the Historia, the expulsion of Pelayo incited Rodrigo to call in his Saracen allies to wreak havoc on Galicia, even sacking Iria itself. On the other hand, the Chronicon Iriense, written about the same time, makes the cause of Pelayo's expulsion the hatred of the Galician nobles for Rodrigo Velázquez, as a result of his destructive alliance with the Córdoban ruler al-Manṣūr. Neither can be correct, however, since Pelayo's election occurred shortly before his father's death, five years before Vermudo's election and some seven or eight years before his expulsion. Al-Manṣūr's sack of Santiago in fact took place in 997.

Rodrigo Velázquez is possibly the basis for the character of Ruy Velázquez in the Cantar de los Siete Infantes de Lara. The character has little in common with the historical figure. In the legend, which takes place in the time of Count García Fernández of Castile, the seven sons of Gonzalo Gustios, lord of Salas, are killed by their mother Sancha's brother, Ruy Velázquez, lord of Lara, at the instigation of his wife, Doña Lambra. Mudarra, the bastard son of Gonzalo Gustios and the Muslim sister of al-Manṣūr, then takes revenge for his brothers by killing Ruy and Lambra.
