= Gutier Núñez =

Gutier Núñez (or Gutierre Núñez) was the Count of Burgos in the tenth century, from between 927 and 929 until 931.

Based on his patronymic, Núñez, meaning son of Nuño, he was probably a son of Nuño Fernández, who is known to have been Count of Burgos in 921 and Count of Castile in 927. At the time these were distinct counties, although sometimes held simultaneously by the same individual. Nuño is not recorded after 927 and Fernando Ansúrez had replaced him in Castile by 929. Probably Nuño had died and the counties had been separated again, Gutier succeeding him Burgos and Castile being granted to Fernando Ansúrez. Gutier appears in a document from the monastery of San Pedro de Cardeña dated 1 March 931. (Note: In the document a certain Barbelo is giving a piece of land to the monastery and its abbot, Lazarus.'"`UNIQ--ref-00000003-QINU`"') The document is dated when "King Alfonso [was ruling] in León and Count Gutier in Burgos". (Note: rex Adefonso in Legione et comite Guttier Nuniz (or Guthier Nunniz'"`UNIQ--ref-00000005-QINU`"') in Burgos.'"`UNIQ--ref-00000006-QINU`"') The king in question was Alfonso IV of León.

The historians Justiniano Rodríguez Fernández and Justo Pérez de Urbel argue that the count of Burgos was not the son of Nuño Fernández but is rather to be identified with a Galician count named Gutier (or Gutierre) Muñoz. He was a grandson of Count Gutier Menéndez, a nephew of Saint Rudesind and a sister of Gotona, wife of King Sancho Ordóñez. Pérez de Urbel points out that the name Gutier is not known to have been used in Castile before the appearance of Gutier at Burgos in 931. The appointment of a Galician from the far west of the kingdom to comital office in Castile in the far east, however, would have been a highly unusual exercise of authority by Alfonso IV. Since Alfonso IV was deposed within months, it is not surprising that Gutier does not reappear as count in the east after 931.

This identification of Gutier Núñez with the Galician count is difficult to accept on two grounds. First, the patronymics Núñez and Muñoz refer to two distinct names, Nuño and Munio, although they have often been confused and it is possible that the copyist of the Cardeña charter simply recorded the name incorrectly. Second, the Galician count died around 999, which makes him improbably (but not impossibly) old at the time of his death, since he would have already been an adult when he was count 68–72 years before his death.
