= Ansur Fernández =

Ansur, Assur, or Asur Fernández (died 947/50) was a powerful Castilian nobleman and military leader in the Kingdom of León during the reign of Ramiro II. He was the first Count of Monzón, probably from before 939, certainly by 943, and he was Count of Castile in 943–45 in opposition to the deposed Fernán González. His family was known as the Banu Ansur (Banu Anshur) or Ansúrez (Assuriz).

== Biography ==
The earliest reference to Ansur is found in a document dated 4 March 921, wherein he is named with his parents Fernando Ansúrez and Muniadonna in a donation in the vicinity of Burgos to San Pedro de Cardeña. His father is not mentioned after 929, but the date of his death is unknown. The leader of the Banu Ansúrez who allied with the Banu Gómez in rebellion against Ramiro in favour of his abdicated brother Alfonso IV in the spring of 932 may have already been Ansur. If so, he was already a count by that time. According to the Anales castellanos primeros, he participated in the Battle of Simancas in 939, where he is one of only two participating counts named, the other being Fernán González of Castile. This indication of his importance and his high rank may also indicate that by then the county of Monzón had already been created by Ramiro II for him. In July 941 Ramiro associated the counts of the Banu Ansúrez and Gómez families as well as Fernán González and Sancho Garcés II of Pamplona with him in a peace treaty signed with the Caliphate of Córdoba.

Despite that Ansur bore the title "count" as early as 939, the earliest direct reference to the county of Monzón is from a diploma of 26 December 943, which reads regnante Ranimiro in Obeto et in Legione et comite Assur Fredinandiz in Montson (Ramiro reigning in Oviedo and León and Count Ansur Fernández in Monzón). By this act Ansur, his wife Guntroda, and their children—Fernando, Oveco, Muño, Nuño, Gutierre, Gonzalo, and Teresa—donated the village of Fuente Adrada near Sacramenia to the monastery of San Pedro de Cardeña. The gift was confirmed by a "Domna Toda", who signs right after the king. This may have been Toda of Navarre. A charter dated 1 August 937 refers to Assuri dominans Menduniae (Ansur ruling "Mendunia", a corruption of Monzón), but there appears to be an error in the dating clause; the correct date is probably 1 March 947.

After Ramiro deposed Fernán González in Castile, he appointed his own son, the future Sancho I, as count with Ansur acting as his "regent". By May 944 Sancho was in Burgos. There are four surviving charters from Ansur's brief reign in Castile; the earliest from November 943. The latest is dated to 1 December 945, though according to other sources Fernán González was reinstated in Castile on 22 April that year. Nonetheless, the reinstated Fernán signed royal documents below Ansur, indicating a reversal of rank.

Ansur's only known daughter, Teresa, married Ramiro II's son Sancho I and was the mother of Ramiro III. She inherited, and her son through her, the county of Monzón after the death of Ansur's eldest son and successor, Fernando, in 978. In 976 Fernando boasted that his father had remained always faithful to his monarch and had served him with valour in a thousand battles.
