= Pelayo Rodríguez (bishop) =

Pelayo Rodríguez (fl. 948–1007) was the Bishop of Iria Flavia (977–985). He was a son of the powerful magnate Rodrigo Velázquez and his wife Adosinda and is usually associated with the conflicts surrounding the accession of Vermudo II after a Galician rebellion in 982.

== Episcopal election ==
There is disagreement in the primary sources (narrative and documentary) over when and how Pelayo came into the see of Iria, though both the Historia Compostelana and the Chronicon Iriense agree that he was elevated immediately after the death of Sisnando Menéndez (29 May 968) by an aristocratic party, but was afterwards forcibly expelled from the see by Vermudo II (982). According to the Chronicon:

Mortuo Sisnando, Pelagius, Lucensis episcopus, Ruderici comitis filius, in Locum Sanctum nonus a dominis et senioribus rogatus adducitur. Qui secularis et non plene scientie conscius, maiores ab honoribus deiciens, iuvenes et pastores honoribus cepit sublimare; spreta senum sapientium societate, et honores et dignitates Ecclesie cepit destruere et a nichilum deducere. Sed cum comites et potestates Galletie patrem non bene rectum nec filium, flores iuventutis adultum, ergo se amicos non senserunt, tunc accepto consilio, Ueremudum iuvenem Ordonii regis filium quondam, apud inclitam beati Iacobi urbem educatum, in regiminis excellentis sublimare conantur, in era M^{a} XX^{a}. . . Qui Ueremudus rex, accepto maiorum consilio, predictum Pelagium, Ruderici comitis filium, a sede prolecti.

According to the Historia:

Después de Sisnando, obtuvo la mitra de este obispado mediante el poder secular, un hijo del conde Rodrigo Velázquez llamado Pelayo [Pelagius … filius comitis Ruderici Velasqui], que ni se cuidó del cargo recibido ni se humilló como debía a su Creador ... por lo cual no permitiendo la divina Providencia que ocupara injustamente la iglesia por más tiempo, fue expulsado por el rey D. Bermudo. . . Entretanto Rodrigo Velázquez, padre del obipso expulsado, unido a otros condes de esta región introdujo acá a los sarracenos acaudillados por Almanzor; los cuales entrando en Compostela, destruyeron hasta los cimientos la mayor parte de las paredes de la Iglesia del Santo Apóstol, excepto su santísimo altar.

The dominis et senioribus (lords and elders) of the Chronicon probably refer to both secular powers and the canons ("elders") of cathedral church of Iria Flavia. The Historia on the other hand attributes Pelayo's rise solely to the secular arm. Further, what is, to the Chronicon, the cause of Pelayo's expulsion—the hatred of the Galician nobles for Rodrigo Velázquez—is for the Historia the result of his expulsion and the ensuing vengeance wreaked on Galicia by Rodrigo's alliance with Almanzor. The chronology of both is incorrect, however. Rodrigo is known to have died between 16 June 977 and 23 October 978, five years before Vermudo was elected as anti-king by the Galicians opposed to Ramiro III.

The Chronicon adds that Pelayo was already holding the Diocese of Lugo at the time of his election; though there is no other support for this. Another bishop, Rosendo, is recorded in Iria in 974. The testament of Rosendo, dated 17 January 977 and confirmed by Ramiro III, is signed by one Pelagius diaconus prolis Ruderici ducis ("Pelagius, deacon, son of duke Roderic"), to whom it cedes the monastery of Celanova, at which he became a monk. Another document from Celanova, dated 7 August 969, has been controversially redated by Rubén García Álvarez to 968 in order to support the reality of Pelayo's episcopacy. The document does not mention Pelayo's being a deacon at the time. A document of 20 September 968 mentioning a bishop Pelayo without naming his see has been assigned to Pelayo Rodríguez by this same author.

Pelayo is first recorded as a witness in a charter of 25 May 948 as a "son of Rodrigo". In 970 he was an ostiarius at the monastery of Sahagún. The first reference to Pelayo as bishop dates to May 977. It has been suggested that Pelayo was designated to succeed Rosendo, being confirmed in holy orders by him (porter in 970, deacon in 977), and then confirmed in his will a few months before succeeding to the bishopric.

== Conflict with Vermudo II ==
Pelayo and his father are usually associated with the party that supported Sancho I and his son Ramiro III. Their chief rival clan was led, during Pelayo's episcopate, by Gonzalo Menéndez, who supported first Ordoño III, later his son Vermudo II. García Álvarez credits fear of retribution from Gonzalo with forcing Pelayo into exile in Celanova. The rivalry between the two families, however, had more to do with a dispute between Gonzalo's mother, Mummadomna, abbess of Guimarães, and a relative of Pelayo's, Guntroda, abbess of Pazóo. Gonzalo defeated Rodrigo at the Battle of Aguiuncias, but the two were eventually reconciled. The resulting bad blood is alluded to as late as 1 October 982.

It has been suggested that when Vermudo came to Compostela to be crowned, Pelayo exiled himself to the monastery of Celanova. One other bishop, Arias Peláez, Bishop of Mondoñedo, appears exiled to San Martín de Lalín at this same time. On 11 September 982 Pelayo granted the village of Oimbra to the monastery of Celanova for the sake of his father's soul. He confirmed the donation of Santa Comba to the monks of Celanova on 1 October. Though neither charter names the location where it was given, Pelayo's subscriptions indicate that he considers himself not only the bishop of Galicia's apostolic see, but also possessing the secular power in the area. García Álvarez reasons that he did not attend the royal coronation in the Cathedral of Saint James on 15 October. According to a theory advanced by Justo Pérez de Urbel and followed by García Álvarez, it was only three years after his coronation (and after Ramiro's death in 984) that Vermudo had sufficient power to depose Pelayo. Nevertheless, on 30 May 985 Pelayo was present in his own cathedral at a court presided over by Vermudo; and on 6 June he confirmed a gift alongside the king to the monastery of San Paio de Antealtares by count Tello Aloitiz and his wife Mummadomna. During his exile he used the title bishop of Celanova (obispo celanovense). Sometime in 985 after his last appearance with the king in June Pelayo retired permanently to Celanova leaving the bishopric to Pedro de Mezonzo.

== Post-episcopacy ==
In a document dated 22 May 987 Pelayo, still signing as bishop, confirmed a donation of the count Almundo to San Salvador de Matallana. This is not the only reference to Pelayo as bishop after 985: there is also a charter dated 25 December 989. These have been redated to 985 and 984, respectively, by José-Luis Martín. Pelayo confirmed some twelve charters as bishop between 977 (and not earlier) and his loss of his see in 985. After his abdication Pelayo remained prominent in the charters for several years, especially in relation to Celanova. The last record of Pelayo Rodríguez is in a charter of 1 February 1007.

Pelayo was capable of good Latin, as two charters with unprecedented formulae (23 October 978 and 11 September 982) indicate, and was well-versed in the Holy Bible, facts which call into question the Chronicon's characterisation of him as "secular" and of little knowledge. According to García Álvarez, the Chronicon was written by a vengeful Bishop Pelayo.
