= Battle of Aguioncha =

Galician–Portuguese civil war

Date	966 or 967
Location	River Salas, Galicia
Result	Portuguese victory

Belligerents
County of Portugal	Kingdom of Galicia

Commanders and leaders
Gonzalo Menéndez	Rodrigo Velázquez

The Battle of Aguioncha or Aguiuncias, the culmination of a Galician–Portuguese civil war in the Kingdom of León, was fought at the hill called Aguioncha on the river Salas in the province of Ourense between two aristocratic factions. The leader of the victorious faction was the Portuguese count Gonzalo Menéndez, that of the defeated one was the Galician count Rodrigo Velázquez.

Rodrigo is usually credited as one of the leaders of the party that supported Sancho I and his son Ramiro III in the wars over the Leonese succession that began in the late 950s and continued into the 980s. The chief rival clan was led by Gonzalo, and supported first Ordoño III and later his son Vermudo II. The absence of Rodrigo from court for a total of six years during the reigns of Sancho I and Ramiro III, and his comparatively frequent recurrence in the diplomas of Ordoño III, does not support the hypothesis that he was a creature of the former, as M. R. García Álvarez believed. The rivalry between the two families had more to do with a dispute between Gonzalo's mother, Mummadomna, abbess of Guimarães, and a relative of Rodrigo's, Guntroda, abbess of Pazóo. Guntroda had appropriated the monastery of Santa Comba, which belonged to a monk name Odoino, who appealed to Mummadomna for support. She sent her sons Gonzalo and Ramiro to force Guntroda to return it volens nolens (willing or not).

The date of the battle is disputed. It may have taken place in 966 or 967, during the regency of Elvira Ramírez. If so, the two counts were reconciled by 968. Justo Pérez de Urbel argued that the absence of Rodrigo and Gonzalo from court during the regency of Elvira was evidence that during this period they were de facto independent, but they were in León on 20 September 968 for the confirmation of a noble gift to the abbey of Sobrado. On the other hand, it may have occurred between 970 and 974. Gonzalo fell out with Ramiro III in 968 after the latter refused action against the Vikings then ravaging Galicia and Portugal. The resulting bad blood between the families is alluded to as late as 1 October 982 in a document that reads in part:

Defuncto autem Santio principe accepit regnum eius germana sua domna Gilvira et perunctus es in regno filius ipsius Sanctionis nomine Ranemirus. . . Tunc in illis diebus excitaverunt gallecos inter se sedicionem comites duo, unum Rudericum Velasconiz et alterum Gundisalvum Menendiz. . .
Prince Sancho dead, his sister the lady Elvira received the realm and anointed in the kingdom was the son of this Sancho, Ramiro by name. . . Then in those days two counts in dissension among the Galicians raised armies between themselves, one Rodrigo Velázquez and the other Gonzalo Menéndez. . .
