= Onneca Sánchez of Pamplona =

Queen consort of León

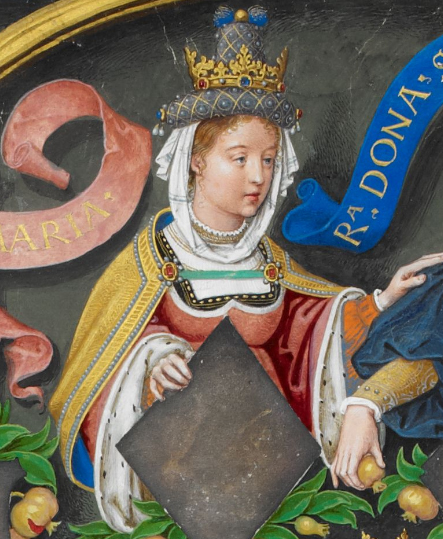
Onneca Sánchez of Pamplona

Onneca Sánchez of Pamplona (died June 931) was Queen consort of León as the wife of Alfonso IV of León. She was the mother of Ordoño IV of León, and the daughter of Sancho I of Pamplona and his wife, Toda Aznárez.

== Biography ==
Her date of birth is unknown, but it was before 911, since she married, in the year 923, with the future King Alfonso IV of León, son of King Ordoño II and the Queen Consort Elvira Menêndez.

In the year 924, her father-in-law, King Ordoño II, died and was succeeded by his brother Fruela II of León. A year later, in 925, King Fruela II died and was succeeded by his son Alfonso Froliaz on the throne, although Ordoño II's sons, Alfonso, Sancho Ordóñez and Ramiro, attempted to seize the Leónese throne and unleashed a civil war.

Alfonso IV, husband of Queen Oneca, was crowned King of León on February 12, 926. He and his brothers divided the kingdom of León in the year 926. To the eldest brother, Sancho Ordóñez, who married a Galician lady, Goto Múñez, was given the kingdom of Galicia, which extended from the Cantabrian coast to the Miño river. Infante Ramiro, younger brother of Alfonso IV of León, was responsible for the government of the Portuguese territory, with its capital in Viseo. For his part, Alfonso Froliaz continued to take refuge in Asturian territory, where he had remained since he was expelled from Galicia by Sancho Ordóñez.

== Issue ==
As a result of her marriage to King Alfonso IV of León, the following were born: • Ordoño IV of León (924-960), King of León. He married Urraca Fernández, daughter of the Count of Castile Fernán González. • Fruela (d. after 958). His existence is confirmed by a document granted on November 18, 958 by his brother Ordoño IV.

== Death and Burial ==
She died in the year 931, around the month of June.

Her remains were interred in the lost Ruiforco Monastery, where her husband Alfonso of León had also been buried. Subsequently, King Alfonso V of León ordered the transfer of the remains of all royalty buried in the Ruiforco Monastery, including those of Alfonso IV and his wife, to the basilica of San Isidoro of León, where they were deposited in a common grave located in a corner of one of the chapels on the gospel side along with those of other Leónese monarchs. Over the common grave, King Alfonso V ordered the erection of an altar dedicated to Saint Martin of Tours.
