= Nuño Fernández =

Nuño Fernández (fl. 920–27) was a nobleman of the Kingdom of León. He held both the counties of Burgos (from c. 920) and Castile (from before 926) in the east of the kingdom.

Nuño was probably the brother of Gonzalo Fernández, who was the count of Burgos and Castile until at least 915. Although records are too scarce to be sure, Nuño probably succeeded his brother in Burgos, but not in Castile, where a count named Fernando was in power in 917. A count named Rodrigo Fernández, mentioned in charter of 926, otherwise unknown, may be a younger brother of Nuño's.

According to the Anales Castellanos Primeros, in 912 King García I of León gave three counts the responsibility of repopulating the southern Castilian lands down to the river Duero: Count Gonzalo Téllez of Lantarón, Count Munio Núñez of Castile and Gonzalo Fernández. It is likely that Gonzalo's younger brother Nuño was also involved in this major act of resettlement. Gonzalo was responsible for establishing the towns of Aza, Clunia and San Esteban. It has been suggested that Gonzalo and Nuño had engineered the coup that forced Alfonso III to abdicate and put García on the throne in 910.

In 920, Nuño and two other counts, Fernando Ansúrez and Abolmóndar Albo, along with the latter's son Diego, defied King Ordoño II and refused to participate in a defensive war against the Caliphate of Córdoba. The king summoned them to Tebular (an unidentified location) on the river Carrión and had them imprisoned.

Although Nuño was a count at the time of his imprisonment, his county is not named in contemporary sources. It was probably Burgos. The earliest surviving document to name him as count of Burgos is from the archives of the monastery of San Pedro de Cardeña and is dated 13 September 922, after his release from prison. Another document from San Pedro dated 25 February 926, early in the reign of Alfonso IV, shows that Nuño had acquired the county of Castile at some point after 922. A document of 26 March 927 recording a court case involving the monastery of Santa María del Puerto in the port of Santoña is dated to the reign of Count Nuño and King Alfonso Fróilaz. This Alfonso, a cousin of Alfonso IV, was ruling the north of the kingdom apparently with his cousin's support.

Nuño is not mentioned after 927. He was replaced as count of Castile by Fernando Ansúrez, who was in power by 1 October 929 at the latest. The next known count of Burgos was Gutier Núñez, recorded on 1 March 931. He was probably Nuño's son and successor. The counties, divided after Gonzalo's death, were thus reunited under Nuño and divided again at his death.

== Sources ==
- Márquez-Sterling, Manuel (1980). Fernán González, First Count of Castile: The Man and the Legend. Romance Monographs.
- Martínez Díez, Gonzalo (2005). El Condado de Castilla (711–1038): la historia frente a la leyenda. Vol. 1. Valladolid: Marcial Pons Historia.
