= County of Monzón =

Marcher county of the Kingdom of León in the tenth and eleventh centuries

The County of Monzón was a marcher county of the Kingdom of León in the tenth and eleventh centuries, during a period of renewed external threat (the Caliphate of Córdoba) and disintegration of royal authority. The county was created by Ramiro II for Ansur Fernández in 943 and was ruled by his descendants, the Banu Ansur (Banu Anshur) or Ansúrez, for decades. The seat of the county was initially at the castle of Curiel and later at Monteson; to its east the river Pisuerga served as a border with the County of Castile. The County of Monzón straddled both banks of the Duero: south of the river its territories comprised Peñafiel or Sacramenia, north of the river it extended to the Cantabrian Mountains and included the populations of Redondos, Mudá, Rueda de Pisuerga, and Salinas de Pisuerga.

Ansur's successor as count was his son Fernando, who had five brothers. All five appear to have predeceased him and when he died he had no sons. His successor was his sister, Teresa Ansúrez, and, through her, her son, king Ramiro III of León. The king immediately travelled to Santa María de Fusiellos, the chief religious centre of the county, and endowed it with the villages of San Julián and Abandella in order to secure local support (and for the good of his soul). Fernando's widow, Toda, was allowed to retain the title cometissa (countess) and govern the city of Dueñas, which was part of Monzón.

The county disappears from contemporary records during its attachment to the crown, and it appears to have been incorporated into Castile after the tumultuous succession of Vermudo II in 985. The Castilian count García Fernández made a donation of the village of Santiago del Val in the county of Monzón to the monastery of San Isidro de Dueñas in the same county, indicating both his ability to dispose of Monzón's lands and his patronage of the church in Monzón. A charter of San Isidro for the year 990 refers to the king and the count of Castile, but not to any count of Monzón. The first sure indication that the Castilians were in control of Monzón comes from a document of Sancho III of Pamplona, which describes how he came to control Castile and Monzón. It notes that Sancho García possedit ... Castella et Monteson (possessed Castile and Monzón) "after Fernando [Ansúrez]", though the document does not mention any intervening rulers. After Sancho García's death (1017), the king of Navarre, with his mother, Jimena Fernández, and the new count of Castile, García Sánchez, with his mother, Urraca, came together to confirm the privileges of Monzón and Dueñas at Husillos for the benefit of the late count's soul. (Sancho of Pamplona was married to Muniadona, García Sánchez's sister.) Monzón remained with the county of Castile until 1038, when the count of Castile, Fernando Sánchez, became king. The boundaries of the later Kingdom of Castile included the old county of Monzón. In 1067 Sancho II of Castile made the monastery of Santa María de Mamblas south of the Duero a daughter house of Santo Domingo de Silos. It is probable that Mamblas represents the southwest extremity of the county of Monzón as inherited by Sancho García.

Historian Justo Pérez de Urbel's argument that in 985 Monzón was annexed by the Banu Gómez clan that ruled Saldaña and Carrión was based on a document of 995 that names them as the only rulers between Zamora and Castile, without specifying the boundaries of the latter. The fourteenth-century historian Ibn Khaldun also thought Monzón to have been a territory of the Banu Gómez, but his witness is too late to be of independent value.

== List of counts ==
- Ansur Fernández (943–947)
- Fernando Ansúrez (950–978)
- Teresa Ansúrez (978–???)
  - Ramiro III of León (978–985)
  - Toda (978–???), in Dueñas only
- García Fernández (985/90–995)
- Sancho García (995–1017)
- García Sánchez (1017–1029)
- Ferdinand I of León (1029–1038)

== Bibliography ==
- Martínez Díez, Gonzalo (2005). El Condado de Castilla (711-1038): la historia frente a la leyenda (in Spanish). 2 volumes. Valladolid. ISBN 84-9718-275-8.
