= Fernando Ansúrez =

Fernando Ansúrez or Ferdinand Ansúrez may refer to:

- Fernando Ansúrez I (died c. 930), count of Castile
- Fernando Ansúrez II (died 978), count of Monzón, grandson of the above
