= Gonzalo Fernández of Castile =

Count of Burgos and Castile

Gonzalo Fernández
- Count of Burgos
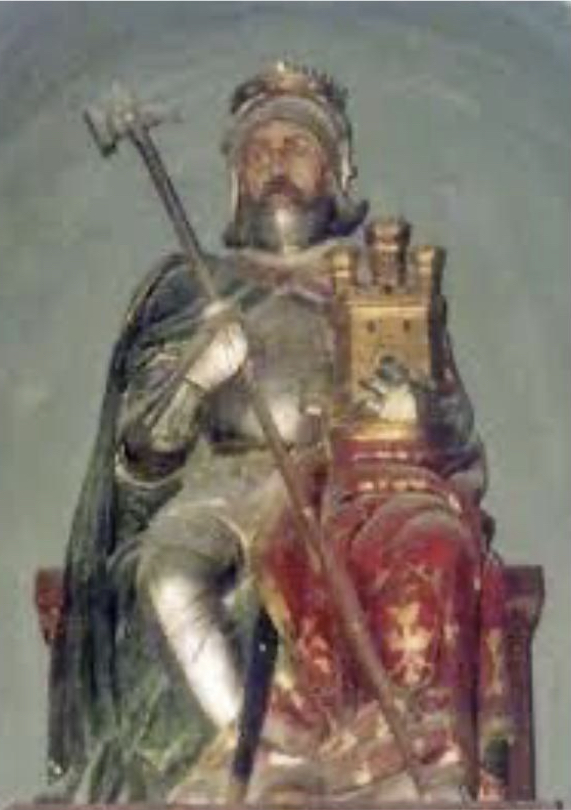
- Statue of Gonzalo Fernández de Lara, Count of Burgos y Castille
- Spouse: Muniadona
- Issue: Fernán González

Gonzalo Fernández was Count of Burgos (c. 899–915) and of Castile (c. 909–915, 912–915 or 915–c. 917).

== Count of Burgos, supporter of monasteries ==
He was recorded for the first time in 899 as Count of Burgos. He soon expanded the region under his control to the eastern mountain valleys, capturing Lara, where a castle was built, thus extending his rule from the foot of the Cantabrian Mountains around Espinosa de los Monteros to the river Arlanza. This became the border with the neighbouring Muslim territories. In order to extend his territory this far, he first had to displace the Muslims based at the stronghold of Carazo that dominated the area and access. This was achieved after a long and well-contested struggle. The valley of Lara was the rallying point from which his son Fernán González achieved the quasi-independence of Castile, securing the area for five generations for the family until it became a kingdom under Fernando I of Castile of the Jimenez dynasty.

Gonzalo's name appears for the first time in charter of the Monastery of San Pedro de Cardeña (899), one of the most influential monastic houses later in Castile, together with the Monastery of Santo Domingo de Silos. He was also the founder of the other monastic house of San Pedro de Arlanza (912).

In 912, he took the lead role in the Castilian offensive to the river Duero, settling the old villages of Haza, Clunia and San Esteban de Gormaz.

== Count ==
Gonzalo Fernández appears as Count of Castile for the first time in a document of January 8, 914, and again on January 1, 915. He appears witnessing royal documents among other magnates and nobles at the Leonese court main assemblies until the defeat of the Leonese in the battle of Valdejunquera (920), after which he was considered dead. Modern scholars suspect that he must have been in disgrace at court for some unrecorded mistake or other major offense typically resulting in exile, as somebody with his name and the then seldom given rank of count — Gundisalvus comes — appears signing royal documents at the court of Navarre between 924 and 930, the year that his son was given the authority of count alone. Previously, his wife Muniadonna, who seems to have been a member of the Asturian royal family, appears holding the patrimony estates and county regency during the minority of their son Fernán. They also had a son named Ramiro.

His remains were laid to rest in a vault at San Pedro de Arlanza, as Friar Antonio de Yepes registers in his "General Chronicle". He was succeeded in Burgos by his brother, Nuño Fernández.
