= Fernando Ansúrez II =

Spanish nobleman

Fernando Ansúrez II (died 978, shortly after 23 April) was the Count of Monzón, Peñafiel, and Campos from 950 and one of the most powerful noblemen of his generation in the Kingdom of León. He was the eldest son of Ansur Fernández and namesake of his grandfather, Fernando Ansúrez I. His sister Teresa was the queen of Sancho I and later regent for her son, Ramiro III.

Fernando had six brothers (Oveco, Gonzalo, Osorio, Muño, Gutier and Nuño) at the time of his first appearance in contemporary records (943), but shortly after being appointed to the county of Monzón (951) only two, Gonzalo and Muño, were still living, and they were recorded as counts along with him. The first record of Fernando as count is his confirmation of a diploma of 17 June 950, where he signs as Fredinandus Assurez comes. Fernando probably succeeded his father, with royal approval, but there is a lapse in the documentation concerning the county of Monzón between 947 and 950.

== Relations with the Caliphate ==
On 12 August 971, according to the al-Muqtabis, the Caliph of Córdoba, al-Hakam II, received six separate Christian embassies in his palace of al-Zahra. The second to last embassy he received was led by a certain Esimeno (Jimeno) and his companion Elgas, sent by Fernando Ansúrez. On 24 June 974 al-Hakam received four more Christian embassies in a single day. The first ambassador, Guitart, came bearing a letter from Borrell Súñer, the Count of Barcelona, making submission anew and requesting a renewal of the existing treaty between the Caliphate and the county. The second came from Emperor Otto II, called "king of the Franks" by Isa al-Razi. His ambassador was a count named Asraka Ibn Umar Dawud, who sought renewed guarantees of friendship. The third embassy, led by a bishop of "Y.r.n.s." (perhaps Iruña) and Nuño González, was seeking the extension of a treaty whose terms were coming to an end for Castile. The final embassy of the day came from Fernando Ansúrez and sought the prolongation of peaceful relations. All were received with hospitality.

Fernando also sent embassies to Córdoba in October 971. On 23 September 973 al-Hakam received ambassadors from the Kingdom of Navarre, Fernando Ansúrez, the Beni Gómez clan, and Rodrigo Velázquez. The Caliph bestowed on them gifts in exchange for reports from the ones who sent them.

== Death and succession ==
On 25 August 976 Fernando, in a charter by which he donated the villages of Tello Barba, Coresce, Sarracino, and Gallegos to the monastery of Sahagún, boasted that his father had remained always faithful to his monarch, Ramiro II, and had served him with valour in a thousand battles.

At the time of his death Fernando had no living sons. He was succeeded by his sister Teresa and her son, Ramiro III, as recorded during the reign of Sancho III of Navarre: transitus est illo comite Ferdinando Anxurez; venit sua germana domina Tarassia et rex Ramiro, qui erat in Legione, venit a Monteson ("this count Fernando Ansúrez died; his sister Lady Teresa came and king Ramiro, who was in León, came to Monzón"). This is notice is preserved in the abbey of Husillos, to which Teresa and her son granted the villages of San Julián and Abandella for the sake of Fernando's soul. Also on account of Fernando's childlessness, his widow, Toda, was allowed to rule Dueñas in the county of Monzón. In 980 she was referred to as domna Tota cometissa iudicante ciui Domnas ("the countess Doña Toda judging in the city of Dueñas").

A document from Husillos during the reign of Sancho García of Castile, who was also count of Monzón, stressed that he "came after" Fernando Ansúrez, though two counts intervened (Ramiro III and García Fernández).
