= Alfonso Fróilaz =

King of Galicia from 925 to 926 CE

- Predecessor: Fruela II

King of Asturias, Galicia and León
- Reign: 925–926
- Successor: Sancho Ordóñez; Alfonso IV; Ramiro II

King of Asturias
- Reign: 926–932
- Successor: Ramiro II
- Father: Fruela II

Alfonso Fróilaz, called the Hunchback (Spanish el Jorobado), was briefly the king of the unified kingdom of Asturias, Galicia and León in 925. He succeeded his father, King Fruela II, in July 925 but was driven from the throne within the year by his cousins Sancho, Alfonso IV and Ramiro II, the sons of his uncle, Ordoño II. He was restored to a royal position in part of the kingdom after Alfonso IV took power in 926, but was violently deposed and forced into a monastery in 932.

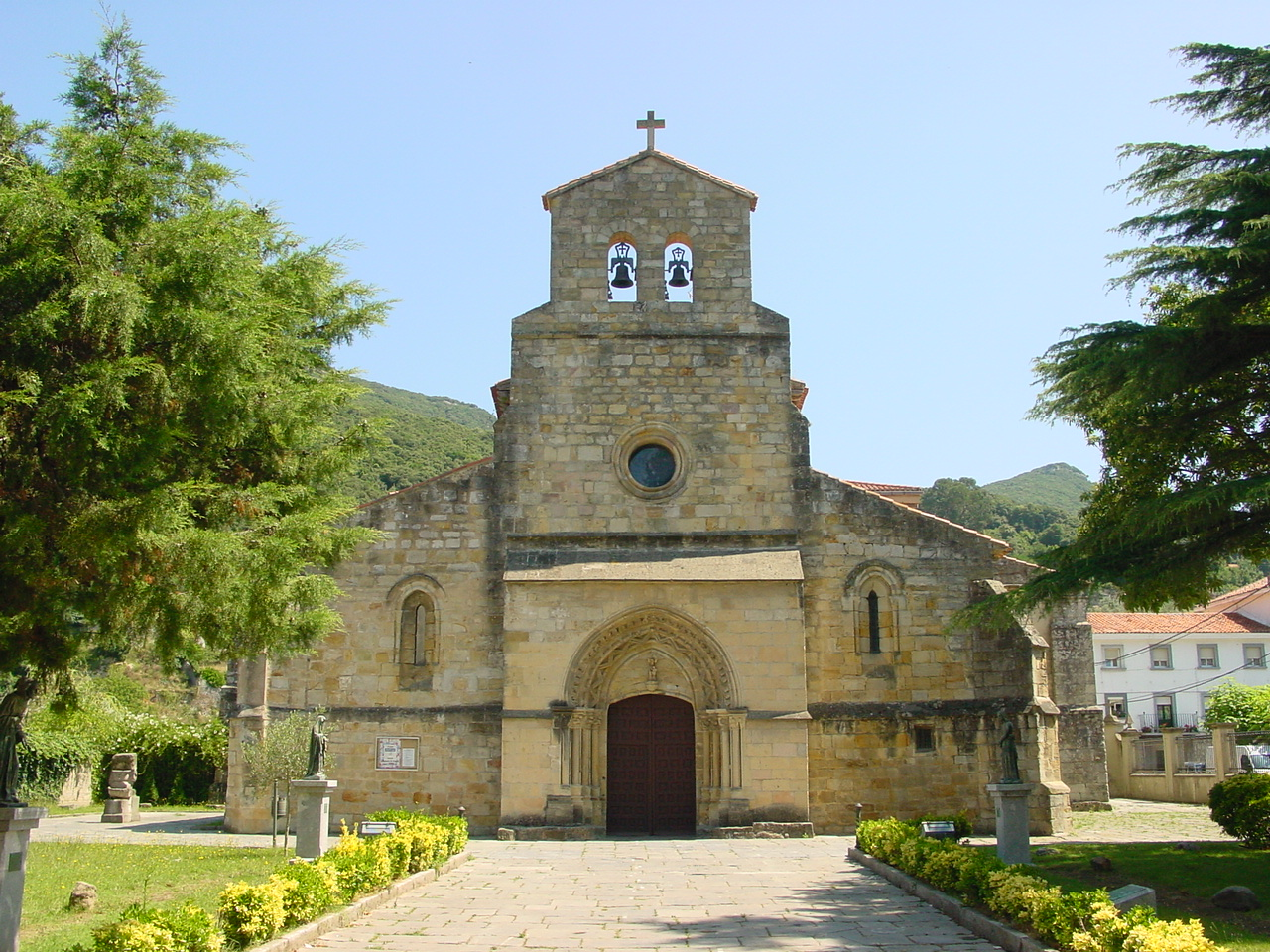
The monastery of Santa María del Puerto in Santoña, which lay within Alfonso's subkingdom in 926–32

Alfonso was the eldest son of Fruela II and had at least two younger brothers, Ordoño and Ramiro. Alfonso's short reign is poorly known. He is mentioned in the king list Names of the Catholic Kings of León, which appears in some manuscripts alongside the Chronicle of Albelda. A cryptic statement by the Asturian historian Sampiro that he "seemed to control the sceptre of his father" is the only other piece of evidence that he succeeded to the whole kingdom after his father.

The deposition of Alfonso Fróilaz precipitated a civil war. Sancho took control of León and was challenged by his brother Alfonso IV, who was assisted by his father-in-law, King Sancho I of Pamplona (died December 925). Alfonso IV was defeated in battle and fled to Astorga in the Asturias, where he made an alliance with Alfonso Fróilaz, who had been forced out of the capital but not the kingdom. The alliance defeated Sancho and forced him to flee to Galicia, leaving Alfonso IV in control of León. The brothers had made peace by 927, with Sancho continuing to rule in Galicia.

In the mountainous northeast of the kingdom, Alfonso Fróilaz seems to have been recognised as king, presumably as part of the arrangement whereby he supported Alfonso IV. A charter dated 16 March 927 in the archives of the monastery of Santa María del Puerto in the port of Santoña records that at that time Nuño Fernández was count of Castile and the reigning king was Alfonso Fróilaz. A document of April records that Alfonso was in his second year, probably counting from the death of his father.

In early 932, Alfonso IV abdicated in favour of his younger brother, Ramiro II, possibly under compulsion. He later attempted to return to power in a coup d'état, but was defeated by Ramiro. To secure his hold on the throne, Ramiro ordered the two Alfonsos—Alfonso IV and Alfonso Fróilaz—along with the other sons of Fruela II and some nameless other cousins "blinded in a single day", according to both Sampiro and the Muslim historian Ibn Hayyan. The mutilated cousins were then placed in the monastery of Ruiforco in León.

The date of Alfonso's death is unknown. It has been argued that Alfonso Fróilaz was the "king Alfonso whose brothers were blinded" that Sampiro names as the father of Ordoño IV, but it is generally accepted that the latter's father was Alfonso IV. The genealogies of the Códice de Roda name Ordoño's mother as Ónega, the wife of Alfonso IV. The twelfth-century Chronica Naierensis confuses the two Alfonsos, combining elements of both. Alfonso Fróilaz did have a son named Fruela who was still living on 29 August 975 when his dispute with the monastery of San Xulián de Samos in Galicia was heard by the king.

== Bibliography ==
- Carriedo Tejedo, Manuel (2013). "La familia gallega del rey Alfonso Froilaz (926–931)" (PDF). Rudesindus: Miscelánea de arte e cultura. 9: 109–54.
- Collins, Roger (2012). Caliphs and Kings: Spain, 796–1031. London: Wiley Blackwell. ISBN 978-1-118-73001-0.
- Isla Frez, Amancio (1993). "Nombres de reyes y sucesión al trono (siglos VIII–X)". Studia Historica. Historia Medieval. 11: 9–33.
- Martínez Díez, Gonzalo (2005). El Condado de Castilla (711–1038): la historia frente a la leyenda. Vol. 1. Valladolid: Marcial Pons Historia.
- Pérez de Urbel, Justo (1945). Historia del condado de Castilla. Vol. 3 vols. Madrid: Consejo Superior de Investigaciones Científicas.
- Rodríguez Fernández, Justiniano (1997). García I, Ordoño II, Fruela II, Alfonso IV. Burgos: Editorial La Olmeda. ISBN 84-920046-8-1.
- Sáez, Emilio (1947). "Sobre la filiación de Ordoño IV". Cuadernos de Estudios Gallegos. 7: 363–73.
- Sánchez-Albornoz, Claudio (1945). La sucesión al trono en los reinos de León y Castilla. Academia Argentina de Letras.
- Sánchez-Albornoz, Claudio (1965). "Apéndice IV: La filiación de Ordoño el Malo". Estudios sobre las instituciones medievales españolas. Mexico. pp. 703–04.

Preceded by Fruela II	King of Asturias, Galicia and León; 925	Succeeded by Sancho; Alfonso IV; Ramiro II
