= Fernando Ansúrez I =

Count of Castile

Fernando Ansúrez I (died in or shortly after 929) was the Count of Castile in 929 and the earliest known member of the Beni Ansúrez family; his father, Ansur, is known only through his patronymic. He was also count of the Tierra de Campos, which was later formed into the County of Monzón for his son.

A certain Fernando is first mentioned in a charter to the monastery of San Pedro de Cardeña dated 13 November 917 as "count of Castile", possibly Fernando Ansúrez. According to Sampiro, Fernando ("Fredenandi Ansuri filius") was one of the counts of the region of Burgos, the chief city of Castile—the others being Nuño Fernández, Abolmondar Albo, and Diego Rodríguez—who were captured by Ordoño II on the river Carrión in the place called Tebulare or Tegulare ("Tejar" or "Tejares" in Spanish, as yet unidentified) and imprisoned them in León. This event is known as the Episodio de Tebular (Episode of Tebular) and it took place probably no earlier than the autumn of 921. The later chronicler Pelagius of Oviedo interpolated into Sampiro's account the words et erant ei rebelles ("and they were rebels") in order to explain Ordoño's action, but this is conjecture, as is the modern suggestion that it is related to the defeat at the Battle of Valdejunquera. Two charters from Cardeña preserve the latest record of Fernando and the only (certain) record of him under the title Count of Castile; they date to 1 October and 24 November 929.

In the spring of 932 the head of the Banu Ansúrez allied with the Banu Gómez in rebellion against Ramiro II and in favour of his abdicated brother Alfonso IV, who had come out of retirement to challenge for the throne. The title count is given to the leader of this rebellion by Ibn Hayyan a century later, and it may have been either Fernando or his son Ansur. Alfonso IV and his allies were defeated in the ensuing civil war, and Ramiro bestowed Castile on his partisan, Fernán González. As Fernando Ansúrez does not appear in the record thereafter, he was perhaps killed in combat.

Fernando married a certain Muniadomna sometime after January 914. She is last mentioned in a document of 919 and was certainly deceased by 929. She was perhaps the widow of García I of León and thus a daughter of the Castilian count Nuño Muñoz. She gave Fernando one known child, a son, Ansur. The earliest reference to Ansur is found in a document dated 4 March 921, wherein he is named with his parents in a donation to Cardeña in the vicinity of Burgos.
