= Chronicon Iriense =

The Chronicon Iriense is a short Latin chronicle of the Diocese of Iria Flavia, modern Santiago de Compostela, during the period beginning in 561 and ending in 982. It is usually found appended to the Historia Compostellana in medieval manuscripts, though it is also found in twelfth-century manuscripts that are otherwise in disagreement with the Historia. It may have been designed to complete the account of the diocese found in the Historia, but there is a school of thought which places its composition immediately after the last events it records, around 982, by the vengeful and recently deposed bishop Pelayo Rodríguez, as both Justo Pérez de Urbel and M. R. García Álvarez believed.

The Chronicon begins with Andrew, bishop during the First Council of Braga in 561 and continues to the episcopate of Pedro Martínez de Monsoncio. It mentions the discovery of the purported body of James, son of Zebedee, during the episcopate of Theodomirus, during the reign of Alfonso II the Chaste, but it does not describe how the body was found. According to the Chronicon, Theodomirus became the first bishop of the new see of Santiago de Compostela in the days of Charlemagne (called rex Franciae, king of France).

== Editions ==
- In Juan de Ferreras, ed. Historia de España, XVI (Madrid: 1727)
- In Enrique Flórez, ed. España Sagrada, XX (Madrid: 1765), 598–608.
- In M. R. García Álvarez, ed. "El Cronicón Iriense" (Madrid: 1963).
