= Libro de las Estampas =

Late twelfth-century cartulary codex of León Cathedral

The Libro de las Estampas ("Book of the Pictures") or Testamentos de los Reyes de León ("Donations of the Kings of León") is a late twelfth-century cartulary codex of León Cathedral. It contains copies of donations from seven kings—Ordoño II, Ordoño III, Ramiro III, Vermudo II, Alfonso V, Fernando I and Alfonso VI—and one countess, Sancha Muñiz. Each copy is preceded by an illustration of the donor. All but Ordoño II are shown bearing the original charter (a scroll with a large seal). These lavish depictions in the Romanesque style served an authenticating function.

The illustrations, however, are anachronistic. The costume depicted is typical of the twelfth century, not the early tenth. Similarly, pendant seals did not become common in Iberia until the twelfth century. Each king is depicted crowned and seated on a throne, bearing a sceptre. The scrolls the donors hold bear their names and a confirmation of their donation. For example, Ego Ordonius minor rex confirmo ("I, Ordoño the younger [i.e., the third], confirm [this gift]"). The depiction of the countess differs from those of the kings in that she is bending her knees while a second figure lifts a sword ready to strike. In the iconography of the times, she is portrayed as a martyr because of her gift to the church.

== Gallery ==
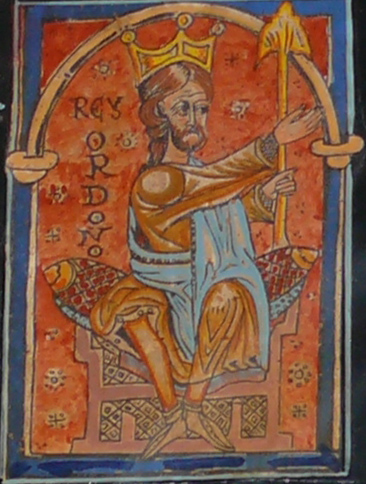
Ordoño II

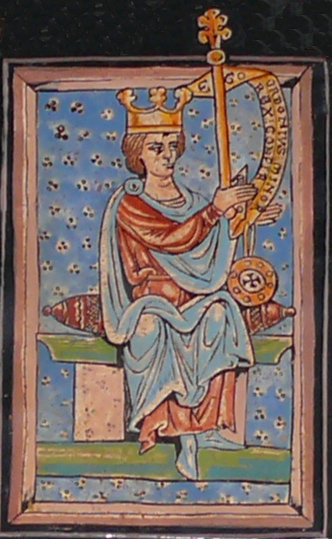
Ordoño III

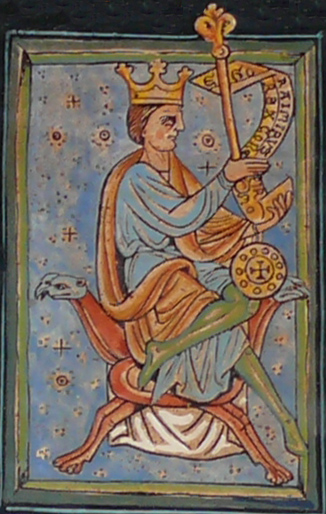
Ramiro III

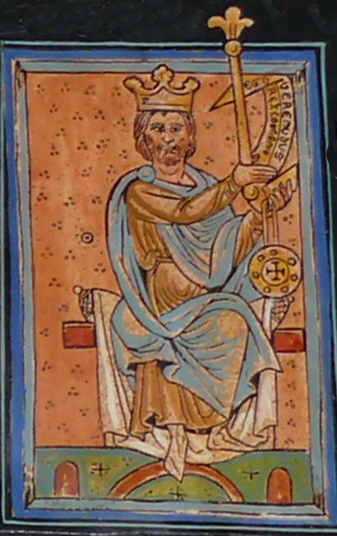
Vermudo II
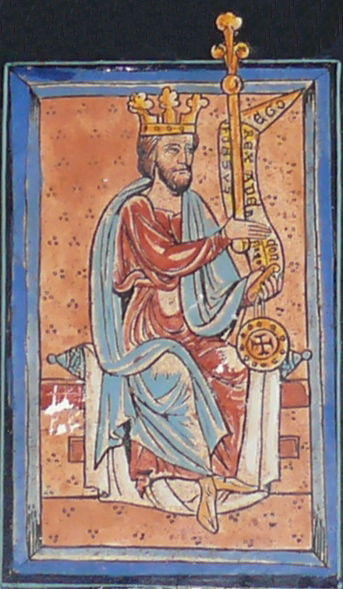
Alfonso V

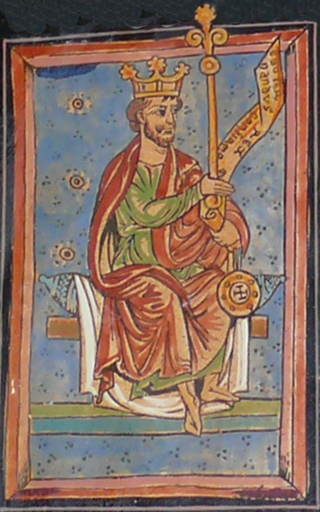
Fernando I

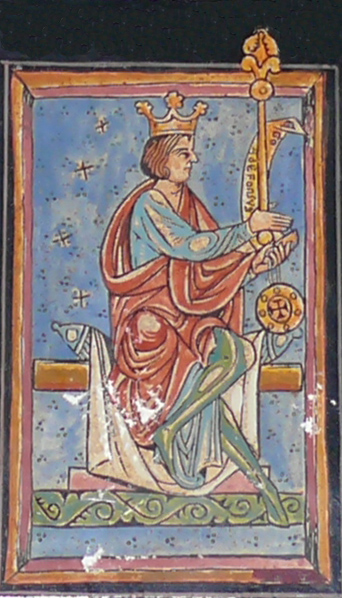
Alfonso VI

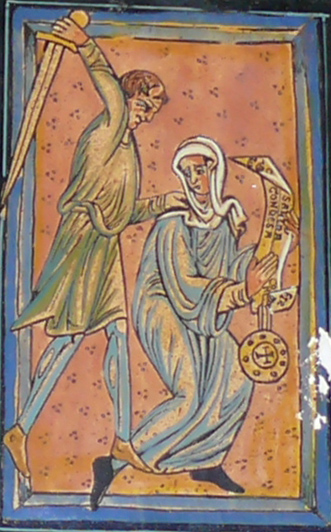
Sancha
