= Ahmad ibn Muhammad ibn Musa al-Razi =

Persian Muslim historian (888–955)

Aḥmad al-Rāzī (April 888 – 1 November 955), full name Abū Bakr Aḥmad ibn Muḥammad ibn Mūsā al-Rāzī al-Kinānī, was a Muslim historian of Persian origin who wrote the first narrative history of Islamic rule in Spain. Later Muslim historians considered him the father of Islamic historiography in Spain and the first to provide a narrative framework rather than bare facts.

A native of Córdoba, he came from a Persian merchant family. He worked for the Umayyad court, which gave him unparalleled access to official documents and archives. Besides history, he wrote genealogies.

== Life ==
Aḥmad al-Rāzī was born in April 888 in Córdoba, then the capital of the al-Andalus. His father was a merchant from Rayy, which is the origin of the name al-Rāzī. His work brought him to al-Andalus. He worked for the Umayyad ruler of al-Andalus as a spy in North Africa and died in 890. His family chose to remain in Córdoba, where Aḥmad spent his entire life. As a child he had the same tutor as the future caliph, ʿAbd al-Raḥmān III, which provided him with a connection to the royal court. He came to work for the central government and used his access to official documents and archives to compile his chronicle. He died in Córdoba on 1 November 955. His chronicle was continued by his son, ʿĪsā al-Rāzī.

== Writings ==
Aḥmad al-Rāzī wrote four known works in Arabic, but none survives complete:

- Akhbār mulūk al-Andalus (Reports on the Kings of al-Andalus), his chronicle
- Kitāb al-istīʿāb (Full Comprehension), a book of Andalusian genealogies
- Kitāb aʿyān al-mawālī bi-l-Andalus (Eminent Clients of al-Andalus), a biographical dictionary of mawālī that may have been a part of Kitāb al-istīʿāb, mentioned by al-Qāḍī ʿIyād and Ibn al-Abbār
- a description of Córdoba in imitation of the style of Ibn Abī Ṭāhir Ṭayfūr's Taʿrīkh Baghdad

The Akhbār mulūk, including its continuation, is a lost work. It is known only from quotations by other historians and a late medieval translation of a part of it. Its scope was limited to Spain and it was divided into three parts. The first concerned the geography of Spain, the second its history before the arrival of Islam and the third its history from the Umayyad conquest in 711 down to the author's present. It seems that Aḥmad's work extended to the accession of ʿAbd al-Raḥmān III in 912, after which his son took over.

Among those authors who quote the Akhbār mulūk are al-Zubaydī, Ibn al-Faraḍī, Ibn Ḥayyān, al-Ḥumaydī, al-Ḍabbī and Yāqūt al-Rūmī. An original translation from Arabic into Portuguese of only a part of Aḥmad's chronicle was made at the court of King Denis of Portugal around 1300. The translator, Gil Peres, had help from an Arab. This translation is lost, but it was the main source for the Cronica geral de Espanha de 1344 of King Denis's son, Pedro Afonso. This too is lost.

Both Portuguese works, however, were translated into Castilian and copies of these translations survive. The Castilian version of the Akhbār mulūk, called the Crónica del moro Rasis (Chronicle of the Moor al-Rāzī), dates to about 1425/1430. It survives in three 15th-century manuscripts. It is limited to the first and second parts of the original work. The Castilian version of the Cronica geral survives in two manuscripts from between the 14th and 16th centuries. It preserves more of the original, including an abridged version of the conquest of 711 and the Islamic period.

== Bibliography ==
=== Works cited ===
- Collins, Roger (2012). Caliphs and Kings: Spain, 796–1031. London: Wiley Blackwell. ISBN 978-1-118-73001-0.
- Fierro, Maribel (2005). ʿAbd al-Rahman III: The First Cordoban Caliph. Oneworld Publications.
- Penelas, Mayte (2010). "Aḥmad al-Rāzī". In David Thomas; Alex Mallett (eds.). Christian–Muslim Relations: A Bibliographical History. Vol. 2 (900–1050). Brill. pp. 288–292.

=== Further reading ===
- Gomes, Maria Joana (2017). "From Aḥmad ibn Muḥammad ibn Mūsa al-Rāzī to Mouro Rasis: Translation and Cultural Dialogue in Medieval Iberia". Philological Encounters. 2 (1–2): 52–75. doi:10.1163/24519197-00000020.
- Lévi-Provençal, Évariste (1934). "Al-Rāzī, part ii [Aḥmad b. Muḥammad]". In M. Th. Houtsma; A. J. Wensinck; É. Levi-Provençal (eds.). The Encyclopaedia of Islām: A Dictionary of the Geography, Ethnography and Biography of the Muhammadan Peoples. Vol. 3, Part 2. E. J. Brill. pp. 1136–1137.
