= Sancho Ordóñez =

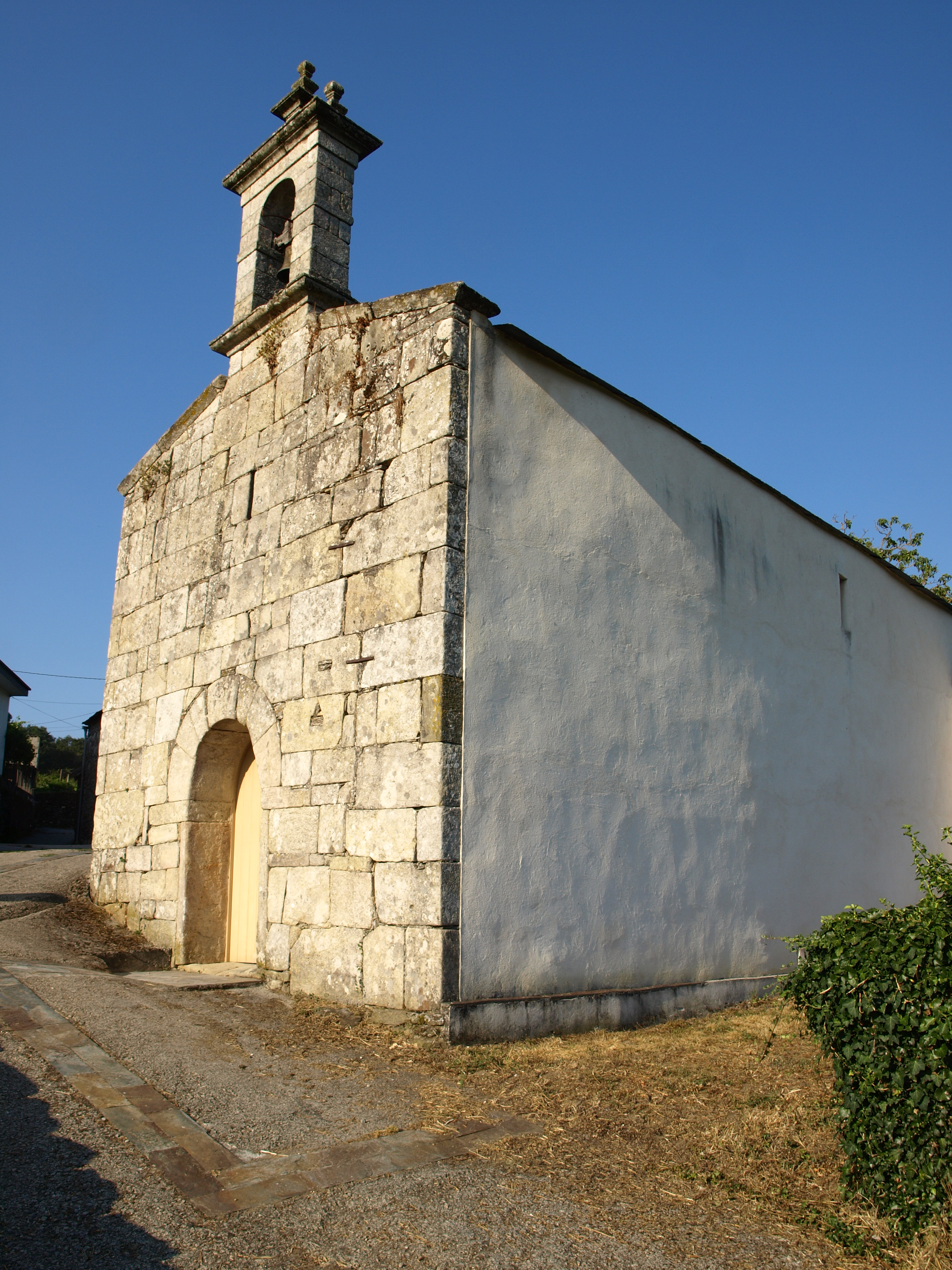
Remains of the Galician monastery of Santa María de Loio, re-founded at an assembly under Sancho and his brother Alfonso in 927

Sancho Ordóñez (c. 895 – 929) was King of Galicia from 926 and until his death in 929, and may briefly have been King of León in 925–26. He was the eldest son of Ordoño II, who inherited Galicia in a partition of the Kingdom of Asturias with his brothers in 910. Sancho acquired the rights to Galicia in a like manner when he and his brothers divided the kingdom among themselves. The surname Ordóñez means "son of Ordoño".

That Sancho was his father's eldest son is explicitly stated by the historian ʿĪsā al-Rāzī, writing some fifty years after Sancho's death. It is also implied by the fact that Sancho subscribed to his father's charters ahead of his three brothers.

At the death of king Ordoño II in 924, Ordoño's brother Froila II succeeded to the entire kingdom. The exact circumstances of the succession upon Froila's death one year later, in 925, are unclear. According to Isa al-Rāzī, Sancho seized the city of León, but was opposed by his younger brother Alfonso, who was supported by the Leonese nobility and by his father-in-law, King Sancho Garcés I of Pamplona. Defeated in battle, Alfonso fled to Astorga, where he enlisted the support of his cousin, Froila's son, Alfonso Fróilaz. In a second offensive, Sancho was defeated and forced to abandon León.

Sancho was crowned in Santiago de Compostela in Galicia in 926. He must have reached an agreement with his brother Alfonso, now king in León, since the two of them presided jointly over an assembly of the ecclesiastical and secular magnates of the whole kingdom at Christmas 927. At this meeting, the royals confirmed the restoration of the Galician monastery of Santa María de Loio by Count Gutier Menéndez and his wife Ilduara. As the brother of Ordoño II's wife, Elvira Menéndez, Gutier was uncle to both Sancho and Alfonso.

In charters he issued, Sancho styled himself Prince of Galicia (Gallecie princeps), a title that implied royal rank in the Visigothic tradition, itself borrowed from Roman practice. Charters pertaining to Sancho's reign are found in the cartulary of the Abbey of Celanova. They show him making a gift of a villa to Gutier Menéndez in 927 and another royal gift to a Galician nobleman named Odoario in 928, and receiving a gift of land in 929. Sancho depended upon and received support from the Galician nobility.

Sancho married Goto Muñiz, a granddaughter of Gutier Menéndez and niece of the saint-bishop Rudesind. In accordance with Visigothic law, she did not remarry after his death but entered the monastery of Santa María in Castrelo de Miño, where she became abbess and was still living in 947.

Sancho died before 16 August 929, and Alfonso succeeded him in Galicia. His reign was marginalized in subsequent historiography. He does not normally receive a numeral, the first numbered Sancho being his nephew, Sancho I (reigned 956–58). He should not, however, be seen as a king of a lesser grade than his father or brothers.

== Bibliography ==
- Collins, Roger (1998). "Queens-Dowager and Queens-Regent in Tenth-Century León and Navarre". In John Carmi Parsons (ed.). Medieval Queenship. New York: St Martin's Press. pp. 79–92.
- Collins, Roger (2012). Caliphs and Kings: Spain, 796–1031. London: Wiley Blackwell. ISBN 978-1-118-73001-0.
- D'Emilio, James (2015). "The Paradox of Galicia: A Cultural Crossroads at the Edge of Europe". In James D'Emilio (ed.). Culture and Society in Medieval Galicia: A Cultural Crossroads at the Edge of Europe. Leiden: Brill. pp. 3–123.
- Isla Frez, Amancio (1999). Realezas hispánicas del año mil. La Coruña.
- Portass, Robert (2013). "All Quiet on the Western Front? Royal Politics in Galicia from c.800 to c.950". Early Medieval Europe. 21 (3): 283–306. doi:10.1111/emed.12019. S2CID 154055998.
- Rodríguez Fernández, Justiniano (1997). García I, Ordoño II, Fruela II, Alfonso IV. Burgos: Editorial La Olmeda. ISBN 84-920046-8-1.
- Sáez Sánchez, Emilio (1949). "Notas y documentos sobre Sancho Ordóñez, rey de Galicia". Cuadernos de Historia de España. 11: 25–104.

Sancho Ordóñez Astur-Leonese dynasty Born: circa 895 Died: circa 929
Regnal titles
Preceded by Alfonso Fróilaz	King of Galicia; 926–929	Succeeded by Alfonso IV
