= Goto Muñiz =

Galician queens consort

Goto Muñiz (also Godo) (c. 900–c. 964 CE) was queen consort of the Kingdom of Galicia

She married Sancho Ordóñez, King of Galicia, before 927; he died in 929. After his death, per custom, she did not remarry and instead retired to a convent. She lived for many years after her husband's death, and was recorded in 947 as abbess at the monastery of Castrelo de Miño.

Goto features in legends of miraculous occurrences, such as one that states her deceased husband would sometimes appear to her and advise her. In one instance, he supposedly told her to take a fur he was wearing, and give it to an impoverished priest. This fur then became a relic.
