= Ordoño IV of León =

King of León from 958 to 960

Ordoño IV
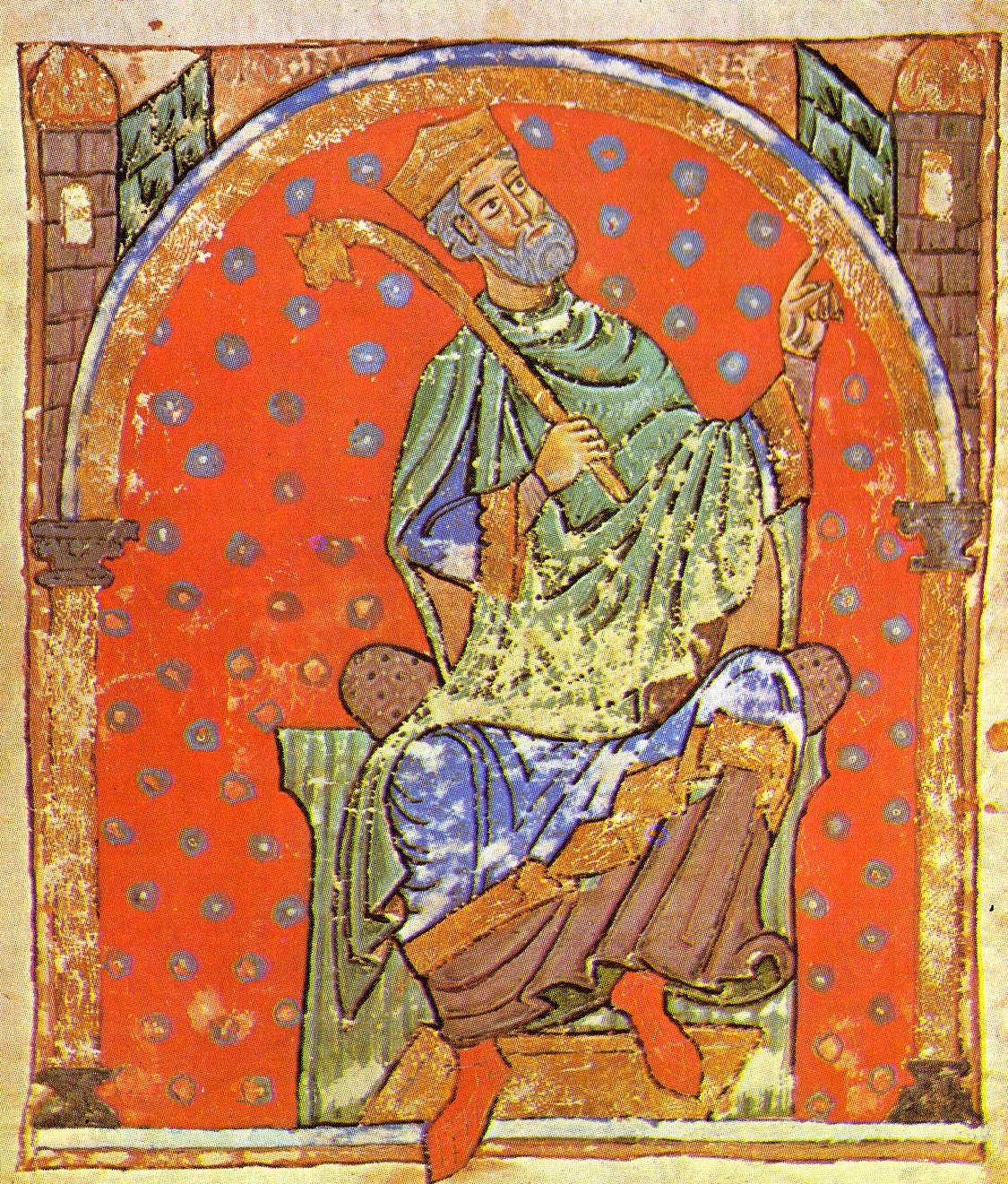
- Miniature from Tumbo A, c. 1129–1255

King of León
- Reign: 958–960
- Predecessor: Sancho I
- Successor: Sancho I
- Born: c. 926
- Died: c. 962 or 963; Córdoba
- Burial: Basilica of San Isidoro
- Spouse: Urraca Fernández
- Dynasty: Astur-Leonese dynasty
- Father: Alfonso IV of León
- Mother: Onneca Sánchez of Pamplona
- Religion: Chalcedonian Christianity

Ordoño IV, called the Wicked or the Bad (c. 926–Córdoba, c. 962 or 963) was the king of León from 958 until 960, interrupting the reign of Sancho the Fat for a two-year period.

He was the son of Alfonso IV of León and his queen, Onneca Sánchez of Pamplona, and nephew of Ramiro II of León and of García Sánchez I of Pamplona.

In 958, two years into the reign of Sancho I of León, he benefited from a rebellion of the nobility that would succeed in briefly placing him on the throne. The Leonese nobles, as well as the disaffected Galician and Castilian ones, had grown sick of the obese Sancho. He received particular help in this from his brother-in-law, count Fernán González of Castile, whose daughter he married. However, count Fernán was defeated through a Navarrese and Umayyad alliance on Sancho's behalf in 960, and Ordoño was forced out. Upon losing his throne, Ordoño fled first to Asturias, then Burgos, where he abandoned his wife. This lost him the support of Fernán González, who allied himself with García Sánchez I of Pamplona. The Castilian count sent Ordoño to Ghalib al-Nasiri, commander of the 'Middle Frontier' in Medinaceli, from whom he was passed on to the court of the caliph of Córdoba. There he submitted and made a plea for aid. The caliph at first offered him help, but this led his rival Sancho likewise to offer his submission, thereby neutralizing any benefit to the caliph helping Ordoño, who died in Cordoba, still dethroned.

During the short period of his reign, he was married, for political reasons, to Urraca, daughter of Fernán González and formerly wife of his cousin Ordoño III of León. After Ordoño IV abandoned her, she would remarry to Sancho II of Pamplona. According to chronicler Sampiro, she bore Ordoño IV two children, but their identity is not known with certainty. Chronicler Ibn Hayyan assigns him a son García, but given that Urraca had a son of that name, the future king García Sánchez II of Pamplona by her third husband, Ibn Hayyan may have mistaken this step-son for a son. Likewise, a minority of modern scholars suggested that Bermudo II of León was the son of Ordoño IV rather than of Ordoño III of León, but a contemporary charter naming Bermudo's grandfather as Ramiro refutes this.

== Notes ==
| Preceded by Sancho I | King of León; 958–960 | Succeeded by Sancho I |
