= Salinas de Pisuerga =

Coordinates: 42°51′N 4°23′W

- municipality
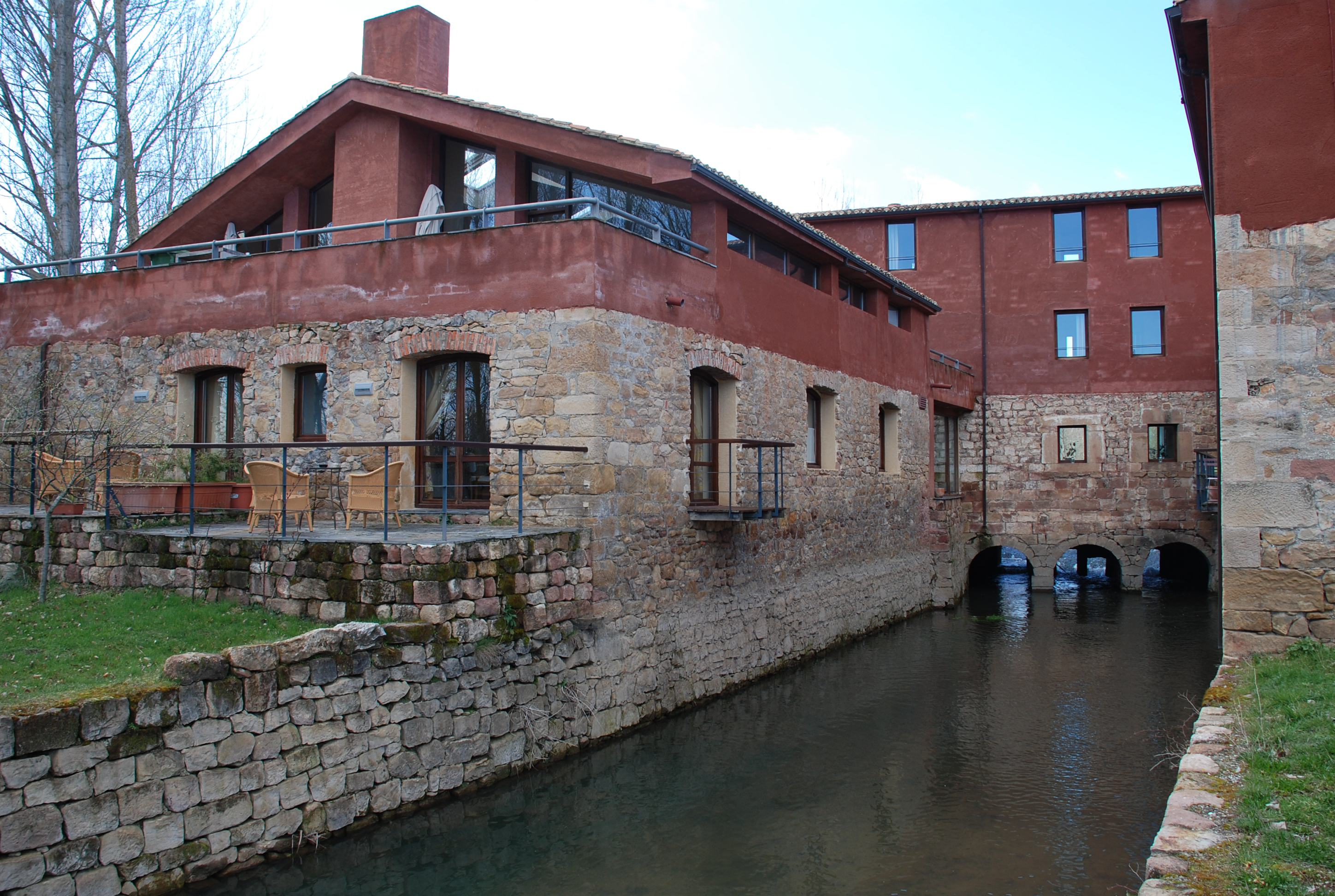

- Flag Coat of arms
- Interactive map of Salinas de Pisuerga
- Country: Spain
- Autonomous community: Castile and León
- Province: Palencia
- Municipality: Salinas de Pisuerga

Area
  - Total: 21 km^{2} (8.1 sq mi)

Population (2025-01-01)
  - Total: 348
  - Density: 17/km^{2} (43/sq mi)
- Time zone: UTC+1 (CET)
  - Summer (DST): UTC+2 (CEST)
- Website: Official website

Salinas de Pisuerga is a municipality located in the province of Palencia, Castile and León, Spain. According to the 2004 census (INE), the municipality has a population of 337 inhabitants.
