= Pedrosa de Río Úrbel =

- Municipality and town
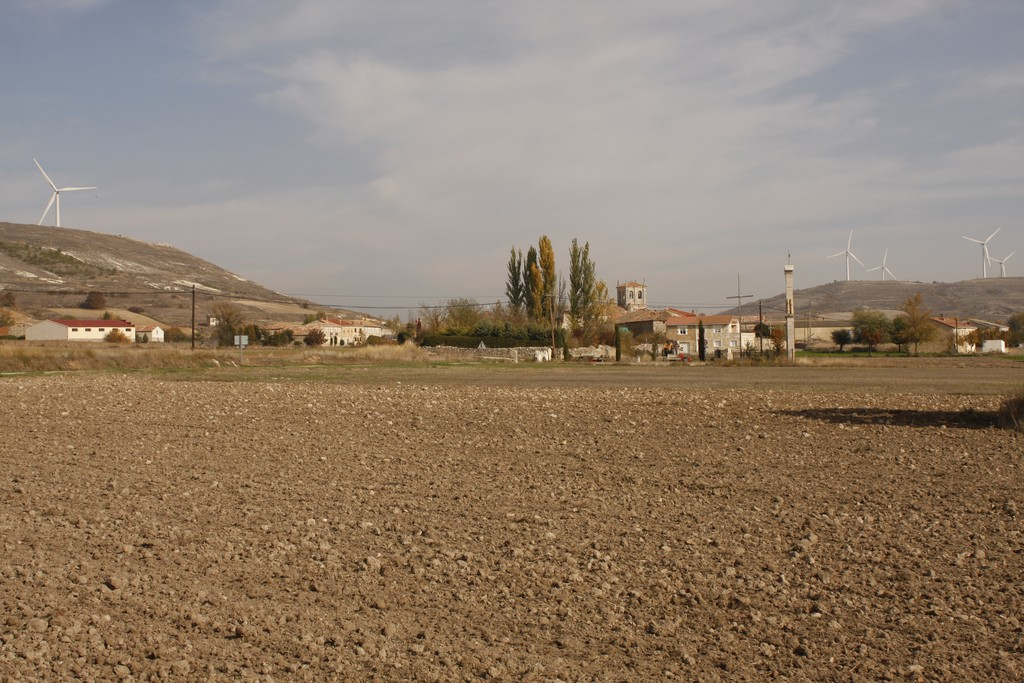
- Pedrosa de Río Urbel, 2009
- Interactive map of Pedrosa de Río Úrbel
- Coordinates: 42.4100°N 3.8217°W
- Country: Spain
- Autonomous community: Castile and León
- Province: Burgos
- Comarca: Alfoz de Burgos

Area
  - Total: 48 km^{2} (19 sq mi)
- Elevation: 845 m (2,772 ft)

Population (2025-01-01)
  - Total: 262
  - Density: 5.5/km^{2} (14/sq mi)
- Time zone: UTC+1 (CET)
  - Summer (DST): UTC+2 (CEST)
- Postal code: 09131
- Website: http://www.pedrosaderiourbel.es/

Pedrosa de Río Úrbel is a municipality and town in Burgos Province, Castile and León, Spain. According to the 2022 census (INE), the municipality has a population of 258 inhabitants.
