= Lamas (Braga) =

- Civil parish
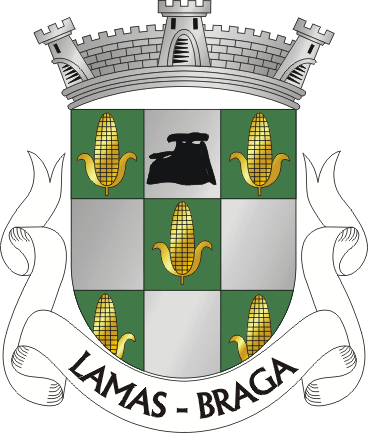
- Coat of arms

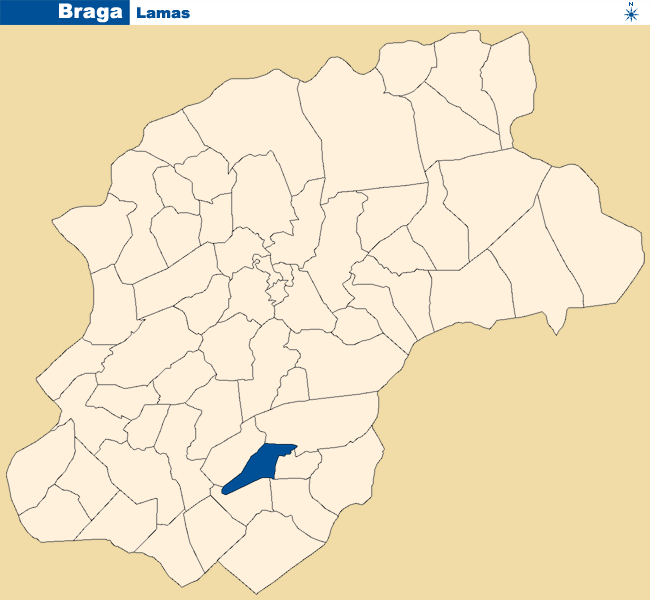
- Coordinates: 41.497°N 8.433°W
- Country: Portugal
- Region: Norte
- Intermunic. comm.: Cávado
- District: Braga
- Municipality: Braga

Area
  - Total: 1.25 km^{2} (0.48 sq mi)

Population (2011)
  - Total: 842
  - Density: 674/km^{2} (1,740/sq mi)
- Time zone: UTC+00:00 (WET)
  - Summer (DST): UTC+01:00 (WEST)

Lamas is a Portuguese Freguesia (parish), located in the municipality of Braga. The population in 2011 was 842, in an area of 1.25 km^{2} (0.48 sq mi).

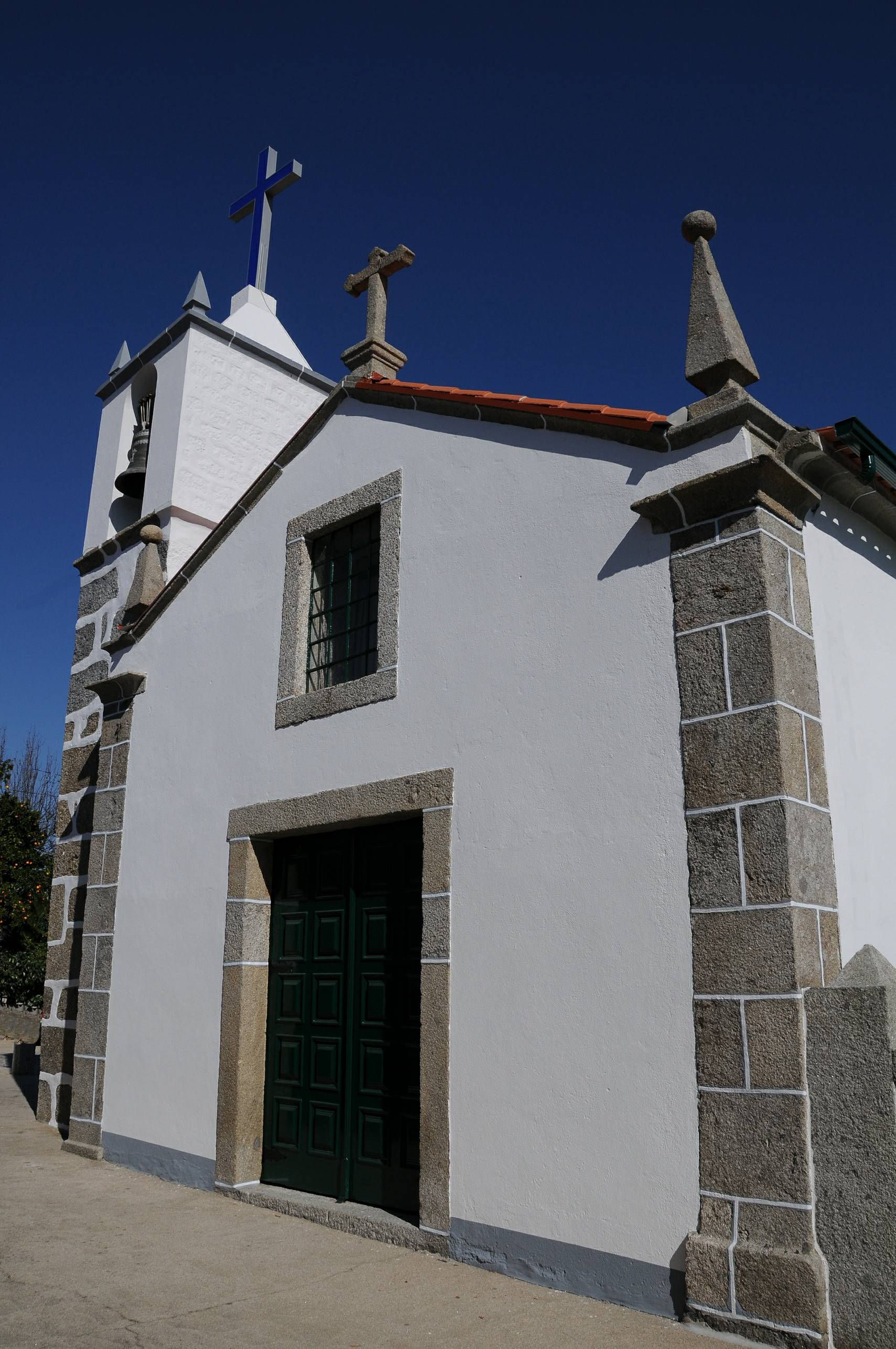
Lamas Church
