= Teresa Ansúrez =

Queen of León (died 997)

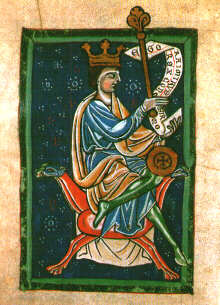
Teresa's son Ramiro III of León

Teresa Ansúrez (died in 997) was the Queen consort of King Sancho I of León, and because of that, she is also known as Teresa of Leon. She was regent of her son in 975-979.

== Consort ==
Teresa was a daughter of nobleman Ansur Fernández and Gontroda Nuñez and sister of Fernando Ansúrez II. She married Sancho I of León and by him had children, King Ramiro III of León and Urraca Sánchez.

== Regent ==
Teresa was put in a convent on her husband's death, and her son placed under the regency of her sister-in-law, Elvira Ramírez. However, when a coalition formed by the latter suffered a military defeat at Gormaz in 975, Elvira was forced to step away from her active role in the government, and Teresa assumed the regency until her son achieved his majority.
