= San Martiño de Pazó =

Parish in Galicia, Spain

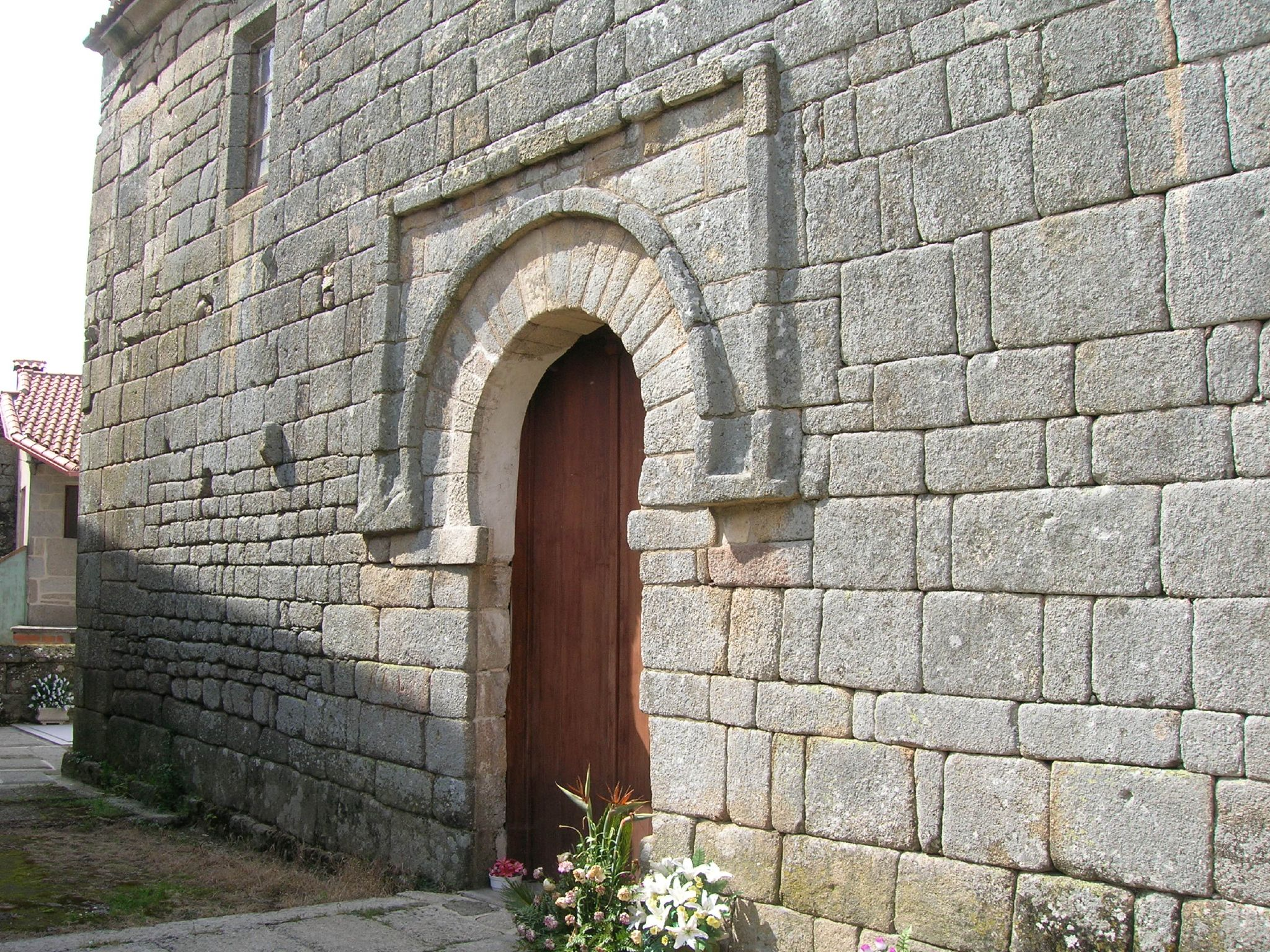
Mozarabic door in the church of San Martiño

San Martiño de Pazó (formerly Pazóo, and in Spanish: San Martín de Pazó) is a parish (parroquia) in the east of the municipality (concello) of Allariz in the province of Ourense in Galicia, Spain.

In the early Middle Ages, there was a convent dedicated to Saint Martin of Dumio, the town's namesake, at Pazó, which itself refers to the living quarters, the "pazo of the ladies", that is, Ô Pazo das Donas or El Palacio de las Dueñas. A dispute by the abbess Guntroda, kinswoman of the powerful magnate Rodrigo Velásquez, led to a brief civil war in the mid-tenth century. Guntroda was succeeded by her relative Ilduara.
