= Anales castellanos primeros =

The Anales castellanos primeros ("First Castilian Annals"), formerly called the Cronicón de San Isidoro (or Isidro) de León (Chronicon sancti Isidori Legionensis anonymum) after the Basilica of San Isidoro in León where they were found on the first folio of a manuscript (now Madrid, BN, mss. V. 4, I), are a set of fragmentary Latin annals, principally genealogical in scope, that cover the years 618 to 939 and were written shortly after this last date by an anonymous compiler. The dating is based on a reference to Ramiro II of León (931–51) as "our king" when his confrontation with the Moors at Osma is recorded.

== Editions ==
- In R. P. J. Tailhan, ed. 1885. Anonyme de Cordoue: Chronique rimée des derniers rois de Tolède et de la conquête d'Espagne par les Arabes (Paris: E. Leroux), 196.
- In Manuel Gómez-Moreno Martínez, ed. 1917. "Anales castellanos", Discursos leídos ante la Real Academia de la Historia (Madrid), 23–24. Available online at the CSIC Instituto de Historia.
