= Isa al-Razi =

Muslim historian

ʿĪsā ibn Aḥmad al-Rāzī (died 980) was a Muslim historian who wrote a continuation of the chronicle Akhbār mulūk al-Andalus, (Note: "Reports on the Kings of Spain") the first narrative history of Islamic rule in Spain, which was written by his father, Aḥmad ibn Muḥammad ibn Mūsa al-Rāzī.

The Arabic version of the Akhbār mulūk al-Andalus along with ʿĪsā's contribution to it is now lost. All that survives of ʿĪsā's part are quotations in other Arabic histories. (Note: His father's original was translated into Portuguese, whence into Spanish. This abbreviated Spanish translation is all that survives, but it contains none of ʿĪsā's work.) It appears that he began with the accession of ʿAbd al-Raḥmān III as emir in 912. (Note: This is the opinion of Collins, based on style. Other scholars, such as García Gómez and Picard, treat only the court history of al-Ḥakam as the work of ʿĪsā and assign that of ʿAbd al-Raḥmān (died 961) to his father (died 955). Picard acknowledges the change in style that is perceptible after 912.) His sections are richer in detail than his father's and reflect the cultural interests of the court of ʿAbd al-Raḥmān and his successor, al-Ḥakam II. The work may have been dedicated to the latter, who died in 976. There is evidence of the use of Christian sources, as in the use of the Spanish era in addition to the Islamic era. ʿĪsā may have had access to the history of the Franks by Bishop Gotmar that ʿAbd al-Raḥmān had commissioned. Ibn Ḥayyān quotes ʿĪsā's history of al-Ḥakam's reign from 971 to 975 in his Muqtabis. Of Aḥmad and ʿĪsā, Ibn Ḥayyān writes, "Together they endowed the Andalusis with a science [historiography] they had not hitherto practised with success."

== Bibliography ==
- Collins, Roger (2012). Caliphs and Kings: Spain, 796–1031. London: Wiley Blackwell. ISBN 978-1-118-73001-0.
- Fierro, Maribel (2005). ʿAbd al-Rahman III: The First Cordoban Caliph. Oneworld Publications.
- García Gómez, Emilio (1965). "Notas sobre la topografía cordobesa en los "Anales de al-Hakam II" por ʿIsà Rāzī". Al-Andalus. 30 (2): 319–379.
- García Gómez, Emilio (1967). Anales Palatinos del Califa de Córdoba al-Hakam II, por Isa ibn Ahmad al-Razi (361–364 H. = 971–975 J.C.). Sociedad de Estudios y Publicaciones.
- Picard, Christophe (2018). Sea of the Caliphs: The Mediterranean in the Medieval Islamic World. Translated by Nicholas Elliott. Belknap Press.
