= Justo Pérez de Urbel =

Spanish abbot (1895–1979)

Procurador Fray Justo Pérez de Urbel
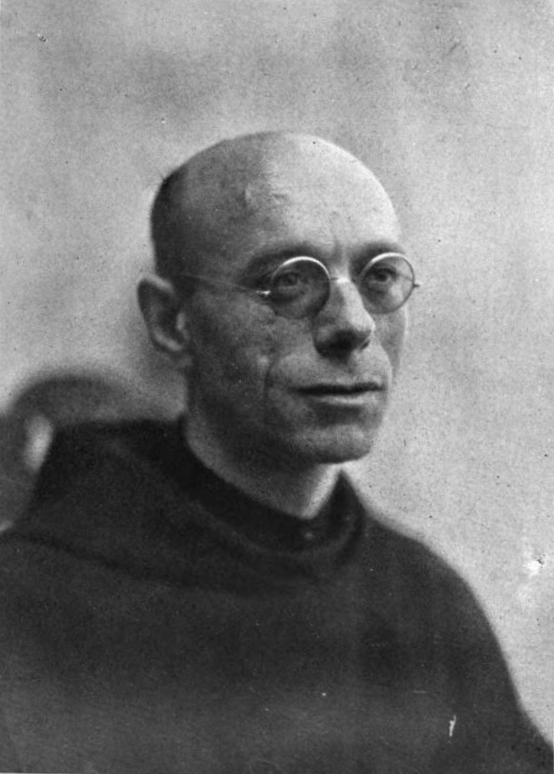
- In office 16 March 1942 – 1967

Personal details
- Born: Justo Pérez Santiago; August 7, 1895 Pedrosa de Río Úrbel, Burgos, Spain
- Died: 1979 (aged 83–84) Cuelgamuros, Madrid, Spain
- Party: FET y de las JONS
- Occupation: Benedictine clergyman, medievalist

Justo Pérez Santiago (August 7, 1895 – 1979) later known as Fray Justo Pérez de Urbel y Santiago O.S.B. was a Spanish Roman Catholic clergyman (Order of Saint Benedict) and medievalist, first abbot of the Monastery of the Holy Cross of the Valle de los Caídos, member of the Consejo Nacional del Movimiento (the first quasi-parliamentary assembly of Francoist Spain), later a Procurador en Cortes (member of the longer-lived Francoist assembly established after the end of the Spanish Civil War) and distinguished scholar of medieval Castile.

== Life ==
Born 1895 in Pedrosa de Río Úrbel, Burgos, Spain, Pérez Santiago entered the monastic school of the nearby Abbey of Santo Domingo de Silos at age 12 in 1907. He enrolled in the order in 1912, and was ordained 25 August 1918. He was already a well-known religious and historical writer during the era of the Second Spanish Republic.

In mid-1938, during the Spanish Civil War, the Nationalists established the headquarters of their Women's Section in the Salesian convent of Burgos. At that time, Pilar Primo de Rivera sought someone capable of leading the spiritual organization of the religious life of that organization. Severino Aznar, father of Agustín Aznar, commented that at the Abbey of Santo Domingo de Silos there was a spiritual and erudite monk who would doubtless be good for the job. Pilar took this counsel, proposing Pérez Santiago's candidature to abbot Luciano Serrano.

That year Pérez Santiago was named director of the new Nationalist children's magazine Flechas y Pelayos, formed by a merger of two earlier magazines, Flechas and Pelayo; he was also involved in Clarín and Maravillas. He was joined at Flechas y Pelayos by Aróztegui and Pilar Valle. The merger of Flechas and Pelayo was intended, among other things, to overcome confrontations between two different factions within the Nationalist camp. Besides directing the magazine, he also "Doctrine and style" section.

After the Nationalists won the Civil War, he was named Prior of the Church of Montserrat in Madrid (associated with the abbey of Silos) and chaplain of the Women's Section of the Falange. At the same time, he was designated as the person to approve or reject applications to establish new comic books.

Pérez Santiago was a member of the Consejo Nacional del Movimiento (the first quasi-parliamentary assembly of Francoist Spain). He became a Procurador en Cortes when the first legislature of the Francoist Cortes Generales was convened 16 March 1943.

Pérez Santiago's first notable writing was poetry he wrote while still a student at Silos. Also at Silos, he became acquainted with several languages, acquiring fluent French, decent English and German, and a good familiarity with Hebrew, Greek, Latin, and Arabic. In 1925 he published the first of what would eventually be 71 books in the fields of hagiography, history, liturgy and art. From the outset, he wrote for a wide variety of audiences, ranging from academic works to works for children.

He received his doctorate from the Complutense University of Madrid in 1950. That same year, by means of a competitive exam, he became Professor of Medieval Spanish History at that same university. He was also Honorary Counselor of the Spanish National Research Council (CSIC) and Director of the Colegio Mayor "Marqués de la Ensenada".

On 17 July 1958, in the presence of the Undersecretary of the Presidency Luis Carrero Blanco and Minister of the Interior Camilo Alonso Vega, he was invested as the first abbot of the Basílica de Santa Cruz of the Valle de los Caídos. The benediction of the basilica was given by the abbot of Santo Domingo de Silos, Isaac María Toribios Ramos who performed a mass and formally invested him as abbot. Pérez Santiago remained an abbot until 1966, when he resigned for health reasons.

On 15 November 1967 he became a member of the tenth National Council of FET y de las JONS.

== Works ==
Pérez Santiago published 71 books and more than 700 articles, reviews, and translations. Among his more noted works in the field of history are:

- Historia del Condado de Castilla ("History of the County of Castile", 1945)
- Sancho el Mayor de Navarra ("Sancho the Great of Navarre", 1950)
- Fernan González, el héroe que hizo a Castilla ("Fernan González, the hero who created Castile", 1952)
- Sampiro. Su crónica y la monarquía leonesa en el siglo X ("Sampiro. His chronicle and the Leonese monarchy in the Tenth Century", 1952)
- El Condado de Castilla: los 300 años en que se hizo Castilla ("The County of Castile: the 300 years in which Castile was created", 1969)
- García Fernández (El conde de las bellas manos) ("García Fernández (The count of the white hands)", 1979)

Among his hagiographic and liturgical works are:

- Vida de Cristo ("Life of Christ")
- El año cristiano ("The Christian year", 1933–1935, 5 volumes)
- San Pablo, apóstol de las gentes ("Saint Paul, apostle to the Gentiles")
