= Alfonso IV of León =

King of León from 925 to 931

Alfonso IV
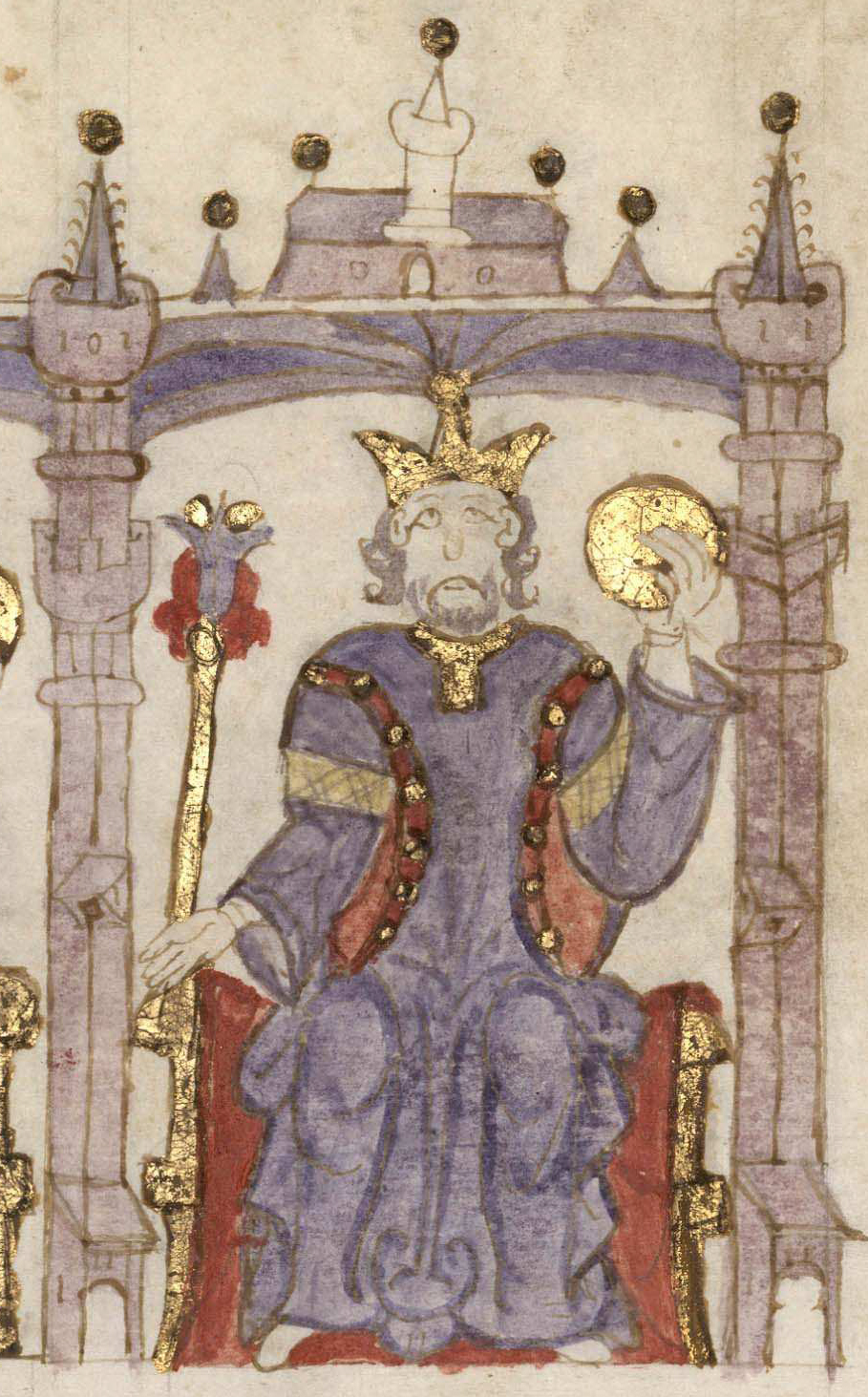
- Depiction in the Castilian manuscript Compendium of Chronicles of Kings, c. 1312–1325

King of León
- Reign: 925–931
- Predecessor: Fruela II
- Successor: Ramiro II
- Born: c. 894
- Died: August 933; Monastery of Ruiforco
- Burial: Basilica of San Isidoro
- Consort: Onneca Sánchez of Pamplona
- Issue: Ordoño IV; Fruela
- Dynasty: Astur-Leonese dynasty
- Father: Ordoño II of León
- Mother: Elvira Menéndez
- Religion: Chalcedonian Christianity

Alfonso IV (c. 890s – August 933), called the Monk (Spanish: el Monje), was King of León from 925 (or 926) and King of Galicia from 929, until he abdicated in 931.

When Ordoño II died in 924 it was not one of his sons who ascended to the throne of León but rather his brother Fruela II of Asturias. The exact circumstances of the succession upon Fruela's death one year later are unclear, but the son of Fruela, Alfonso Fróilaz, became king in at least part of the kingdom when his father died. Sancho Ordóñez, Alfonso, and Ramiro, the sons of Ordoño II, claimed to be the rightful heirs and rebelled against their cousin. With the support of king Jimeno Garcés of Pamplona, they drove Alfonso Fróilaz to the eastern marches of Asturias, and divided the kingdom among themselves with Alfonso Ordóñez receiving the crown of León and his elder brother Sancho being acclaimed king in Galicia.

Alfonso IV resigned the crown to his brother Ramiro in 931 and went into a religious house. One year later he took up arms with Fruela's sons Ordoño and Ramiro against his own brother Ramiro, having repented of his renunciation of the world. He was defeated, blinded, and sent back to die in the cloister of Sahagún. Alfonso had married Onneca Sánchez of Pamplona, niece of his ally Jimeno Garcés and daughter of Sancho I of Pamplona by Toda of Navarre. He had two children: Ordoño IV of León, and perhaps another son, Fruela, who was involved in a land dispute during the reign of Ramiro III of León. (Note: A minority of modern scholars including Claudio Sánchez-Albornoz and Manuel Carriedo Tejedo, consider Ordoño IV instead to have been son of his rival Alfonso Fróilaz. Independently, the placement of the Froylani prolis Adefonsi regis (Fruela, son of king Alfonso) of the time of Ramiro III as son of king Alfonso IV rather than king Alfonso Fróilaz has been disputed.)

== Bibliography ==
- Arco y Garay, Ricardo del (1954). Sepulcros de la Casa Real de Castilla. Madrid: Instituto Jerónimo Zurita. OCLC 11366237.
- Carriedo Tejedo, Manuel (2002). "La frontera entre León y Córdoba a mediados del siglo X: desde Santarén a Huesca" (PDF). Estudios Humanísticos. Historia (1). León: Universidad de León: Servicio de Publicaciones: 63–93. doi:10.18002/ehh.v0i1.2918. ISSN 1696-0300. Archived from the original (PDF) on 14 July 2014.
- Ceballos-Escalera, Alfonso (2000). Reyes de León: Ordoño III (951–956), Sancho I (956–966), Ordoño IV (958–959), Ramiro III (966–985), Vermudo II (982–999). Burgos: La Olmeda. ISBN 84-89915-11-3.
- Elorza, Juan C.; Vaquero, Lourdes; Castillo, Belén; Negro, Marta (1990). Junta de Castilla y León. Consejería de Cultura y Bienestar Social (ed.). El Panteón Real de las Huelgas de Burgos. Los enterramientos de los reyes de León y de Castilla (2nd ed.). León: publisher Evergráficas S.A. ISBN 84-241-9999-5.
- González Flórez, Maximiliano (1981). "El Infantado de Torío" (PDF). Tierras de León: Revista de la Diputación Provincial (45). León: Diputación de León: 35–60. ISSN 0495-5773.
- Isla Frez, Amancio (1993). "Nombres de reyes y sucesión al trono (siglos VIII-X)". Studia historica. Historia medieval (11). Salamanca: Universidad de Salamanca: Ediciones Universidad de Salamanca y Departamento de Historia Medieval, Moderna y Contemporánea: 9–34. ISSN 0213-2060.
- Martínez Diez, Gonzalo (2005). El Condado de Castilla (711–1038): la historia frente a la leyenda. Valladolid. ISBN 84-9718-275-8.
- Moráis Morán, José Alberto (2010). "En torno a los procesos de la creación artística románica en el medio rural: los tímpanos de Ruiforco y Matueca de Torío (León)". De arte: Revista de historia del arte (9). León: Universidad de León: Servicio de Publicaciones: 37–60. ISSN 1696-0319.
- Pamplona, Gerardo de (1946). "Un nuevo rey de León, Alfonso hijo de Fruela II". Príncipe de Viana (23). Pamplona: Gobierno de Navarra: Institución Príncipe de Viana: 261–270. ISSN 0032-8472.
- Pérez Llamazares, Julio (1953). "Panteones reales leoneses". Hidalguía: La revista de genealogía, nobleza y armas (2). Madrid: 341–346. ISSN 0018-1285.
- Prada Marcos, María Encina (1998). "Estudio antropológico del Panteón Real de San Isidoro: La antropología al servicio de la Historia: Un caso real" (PDF). ProMonumenta (II). OCLC 630664764.
- Risco, Manuel (1792). Historia de la ciudad y corte de León y de sus reyes (1st ed.). Madrid: En la oficina de don Blas Román. OCLC 18852768.
- Rodríguez Fernández, Justiniano (1997). Reyes de León (I). García I, Ordoño II, Fruela II y Alfonso IV (1st ed.). Burgos: La Olmeda. ISBN 84-920046-8-1.
- Rodríguez Fernández, Justiniano (1987). Sancho I y Ordoño IV, reyes de León. Madrid: Consejo Superior de Investigaciones Científicas. ISBN 84-00-06510-7.
- Sáez, Emilio (1947). "Los ascendientes de San Rosendo, notas para el estudio de la monarquía astur-leonesa durante los siglos IX y X". Hispania (XXX). CSIC, Instituto Jerónimo Zurita. OCLC 2594708.
- Salazar y Acha, Jaime de (2006). "Urraca. Un nombre egregio en la onomástica altomedieval". En la España Medieval (1). Universidad Complutense: Servicio de Publicaciones y Departamento de Historia Medieval: 29–48. ISSN 0214-3038.
- Ser Quijano, Gregorio (1981). Documentación de la catedral de León (siglos IX-X) (1st ed.). Salamanca: Ediciones Universidad de Salamanca. ISBN 84-7481-160-0.
- Torres Sevilla-Quiñones de León, Margarita Cecilia (1999). Linajes nobiliarios de León y Castilla: Siglos IX-XIII. Salamanca: Junta de Castilla y León, Consejería de Educación y Cultura. ISBN 84-7846-781-5.
- Viñayo González, Antonio (1998). Real Colegiata de San Isidoro: Historia, Arte y Vida. León: Edilesa. ISBN 84-8012-201-3.

Alfonso IV of León Astur-Leonese dynasty Born: circa 890s Died: August 933
Regnal titles
Preceded by Fruela II or Alfonso Fróilaz	King of León; 925–931	Succeeded by Ramiro II
Preceded by Sancho I Ordóñez	King of Galicia from 929 (united with León)	Succeeded by Ramiro II
