= Castrillo del Val =

- municipality
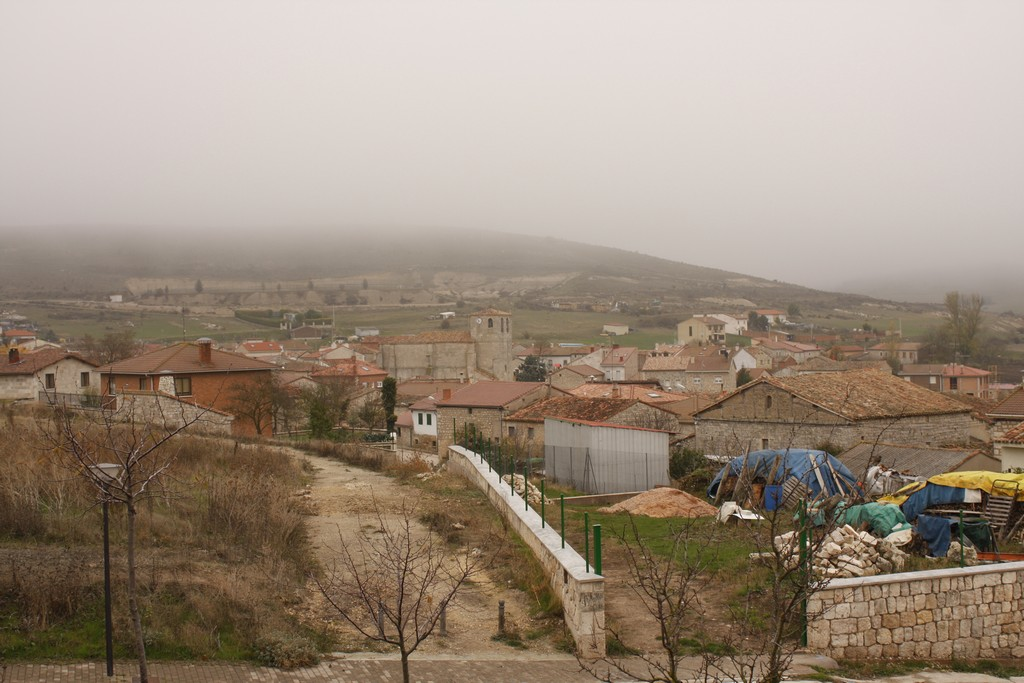
- View of Castrillo del Val, 2009

- Flag Coat of arms
- Interactive map of Castrillo del Val
- Coordinates: 42°19′N 3°35′W
- Country: Spain
- Autonomous community: Castile and León
- Province: Burgos
- Comarca: Alfoz de Burgos
- Founded: 880-900

Area
  - Total: 23 km^{2} (8.9 sq mi)
- Elevation: 939 m (3,081 ft)

Population (2025-01-01)
  - Total: 858
  - Density: 37/km^{2} (97/sq mi)
- Time zone: UTC+1 (CET)
  - Summer (DST): UTC+2 (CEST)
- Postal code: 09193
- Website: https://www.castrillodelval.es/

Castrillo del Val is a municipality located in the province of Burgos, Castile and León, Spain. It is in the valley of the River Arlanzón.

According to the 2004 census (INE), the municipality had a population of 515 inhabitants.

== Main sights ==
- Abbey of San Pedro de Cardeña (9th-17th century)

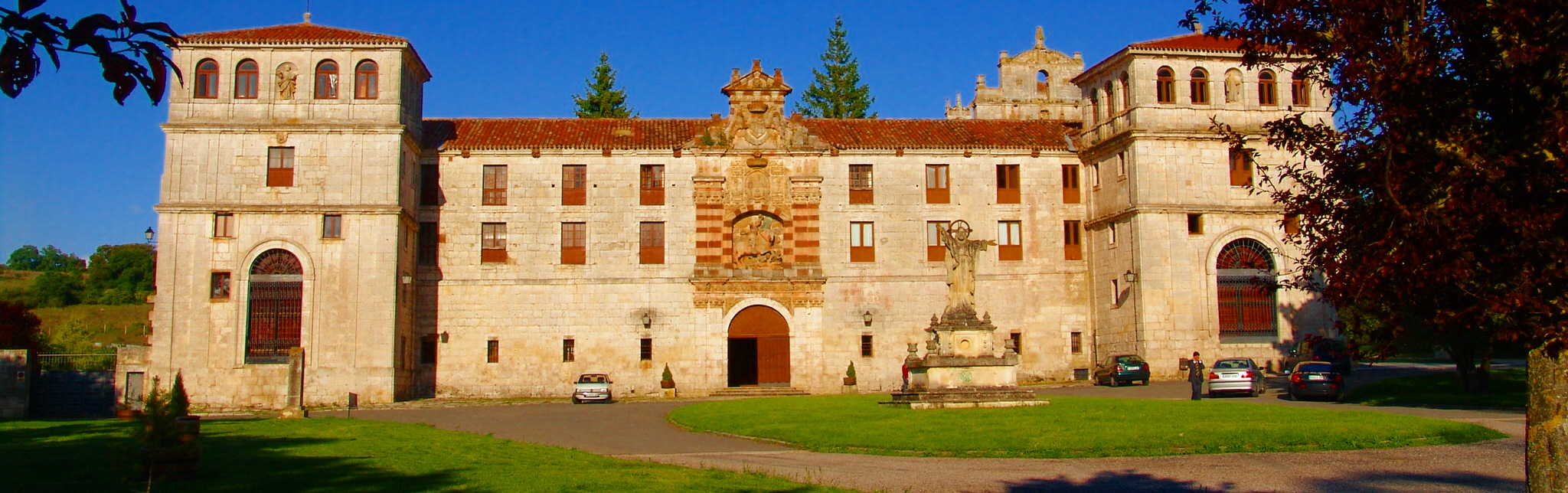
San Pedro de Cardeña main façade.

This abbey was the burial place of El Cid, the 11th century warrior, his wife Jimena Díaz and, supposedly, his horse Babieca. The remains were removed during the Napoleonic Wars when occupying troops ransacked tombs looking for treasure. El Cid and his wife were reburied in Burgos.

During the Spanish Civil War the monastery was used as a concentration camp and its female prisoners were experimented on by Antonio Vallejo-Nájera in order to find a link between intellectual disability and Marxism.

Since the 1940s the abbey has belonged to the Trappist order.
