= Ordoño III of León =

King of León from 951 to 956

Ordoño III
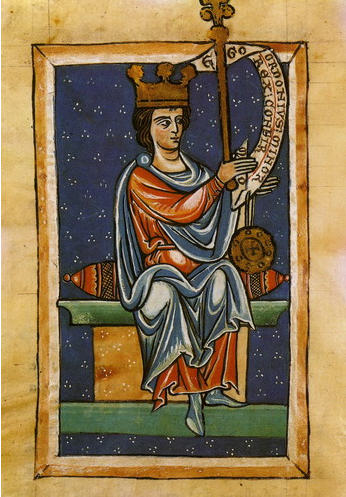
- Depiction of Ordoño III based on the 12th-century Libro de las Estampas

King of León
- Reign: 951–956
- Predecessor: Ramiro II
- Successor: Sancho I
- Born: c. 926
- Died: c. 956; Zamora
- Burial: Basilica of San Isidoro
- Consort: Urraca Fernández
- Issue: Ordoño; Theresa; Bermudo II of León
- Dynasty: Astur-Leonese dynasty
- Father: Ramiro II of León
- Mother: Adosinda Gutiérrez
- Religion: Chalcedonian Christianity

Ordoño III (c. 926–956) was the King of León from 951 to 956, son and successor of Ramiro II (931–951). He confronted Navarre and Castile, who supported his half-brother Sancho the Fat in disputing Ordoño's claim to the throne.

He also had to deal with internal rebellion, attacks from the Muslims of al-Andalus, and the rebellion of Galicia. In response to the Muslims, Ordoño III led a raid as far as Lisbon (955), coming back north with a very lucrative haul of loot. Faced with this great show of force, Abd-al-Rahman III (912–961) was pushed to negotiate and conclude a peace treaty with the king of León.

He tried to continue the actions of his father in fortifying the land and the royal authority in the face of the wilfully secessional Fernán González of Castile. He even married Fernán's daughter Urraca and later repudiated her over her father's alliance with Sancho.

Urraca bore him at least two children: a son named Ordoño who died young and a daughter named Theresa who became a nun. Ordoño III was also father of Bermudo II, but opinion is divided as to whether he was son of Urraca, or of a mistress, one of the daughters of Count Pelayo González.

Ordoño III died at Zamora in 956.

== Notes ==
Ordoño III of León Astur-Leonese dynasty Born: c. 926 Died: 956
Preceded by Ramiro II	King of León; 951–956	Succeeded by Sancho I
