= Sancho I of León =

King of León (956–958, 960–966)

Sancho I
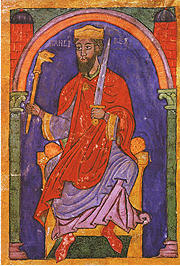
- A miniature of Sancho I, from the Tumbo A in the Cathedral of Santiago de Compostela.

King of León
- Reign: 956–958
- Predecessor: Ordoño III
- Successor: Ordoño IV
- Reign: 960–966
- Predecessor: Ordoño IV
- Successor: Ramiro III
- Born: c. 932
- Died: c. 19 December 966
- Burial: Basilica of San Isidoro
- Consort: Teresa Ansúrez
- Issue: Ramiro III; Urraca
- Dynasty: Astur-Leonese dynasty
- Father: Ramiro II of León
- Mother: Urraca Sánchez of Pamplona
- Religion: Chalcedonian Christianity
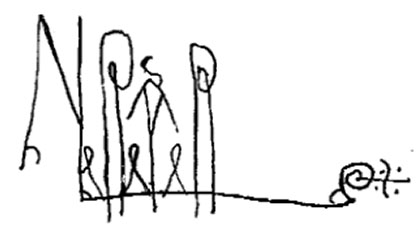
- Signature

Sancho I of León, nicknamed Sancho the Fat (c. 932 – 19 December 966) was a king of León twice. He was succeeded in 958 by Ordoño IV and, on his death, by his son Ramiro.

== Reign ==
He was the son of Ramiro II of León and his second wife queen Urraca Sánchez of Pamplona. He was a grandson of Sancho I of Pamplona and Toda Aznárez. Ramiro II was succeeded by his son Ordoño III in 951. At first, the younger Sancho disputed the throne with his elder brother. Upon Ordoño's death in 956, he took the vacant throne. Sancho had the support of part of the nobility, his grandmother and the Count of Castile, Fernán González (Ordoño's brother-in-law). Ordoño defeated the rebels beside the walls of León. However, only two years later, he was deposed by the nobles led by Fernán González of Castile because of his extreme obesity. He was replaced by Ordoño the Wicked from 958 to 960.

Sancho had refused to respect the peace that the late Ordoño had agreed with the Cordovans, who sent an army against him that defeated him in 957, an event that increased his discredit and favoured his overthrow. So, he first went to his grandmother Toda of Pamplona and asked for aid in recovering his throne. Queen Toda, Sancho I and his wife Teresa Ansúrez travelled to Córdoba in 958. This led to a deal being signed with the Caliph of the Caliphate of Córdoba, Abderramán III, to help to recover the throne of León in exchange for some territory on the banks of the Duero. During his exile in Andalus, according to Dozy, Sancho managed to shed at least some portion of his girth under the treatment of court doctor Hasdai ibn Shaprut by not allowing him to take more than infusions for forty days.

Sancho concluded a treaty with the Moors and, with the help of the Leonese and Navarrese noblesse, and in accordance with the signed pact, a Muslim-Pamplonian army took Zamora in the spring of 959 and León in the second half of 960 and restored Sancho I as king. Ordoño IV fled to Asturias. The king did not take long to forget his agreement with Abderramán III, who then came to support Ordoño IV, although this time, their confrontation did not go beyond a few punitive raids on his lands.

=== Later reign ===
The final years of his reign were characterised by the growing independence of the Castilian and Galician nobility.

In 966, Sancho founded the monastery of San Pelayo in the city of León, consecrated in honour of the Cordovan martyr San Pelayo whose remains were transferred by the king to the capital of the kingdom of León, although they were later taken to Oviedo. Located next to the pantheon of kings of San Isidoro de León, this monastery replaced that of San Salvador de Palat de Rey as a court monastery and became the "head of the homonymous infantazgo", the infantado de San Pelayo, where the infantas were secluded who took the habit as well as the widowed queens. Years later, in 1148, the monastery moved to Carbajal de la Leguaand since then, it has been known as the monastery of Santa María de Carbajal and the Benedictine nuns who lived there, the "Carbajalas".

He was poisoned and subsequently died in 966; he was not yet 35 years old. According to the chronicle of Sampiro, in the Galician monastery of Castrelo de Miño by the rebel count Gonzalo Menéndez, who gave him a poisonous apple: Gundisaluus, qui dux erat (...) veneni pocula illi in pomo duxit. The identification of Count Gonzalo Menéndez as Count Gonzalo who poisoned the king is not supported by all historians as his patronymic is not indicated and because of the existence of another contemporary count named Gonzalo Muñoz (Moniz). Sancho I was succeeded by his son Ramiro III. His wife was queen Teresa Ansúrez. Although the exact day of his death is not known, it will have occurred between 15 November, the date of the last diploma in which Sancho I appears, and 19 December, the date of the first diploma of his son Ramiro III.

== Burial ==
He was buried in the monastery of Castrelo de Miño, and later his mortal remains were transferred to the city of León, where they were buried in the church of San Salvador de Palat del Rey. This church was part of a monastery, now disappeared, which was founded during the reign of Ramiro II by his daughter, the Infanta Elvira Ramírez, who wanted to be a nun. In the same church, the kings Ordoño III and Ramiro II, father and brother of Sancho I the Gross, had previously been buried.

The mortal remains of the three Leonese sovereigns buried in the church of San Salvador de Palat del Rey were later transferred to the Basilica of San Isidoro de León, where they were placed in the corner of one of the chapels on the Gospel side, where they also lay the remains of other kings, such as Alfonso IV, and not in the pantheon of kings of San Isidoro de León.

== Sources ==
- Arco y Garay, Ricardo del (1954). Sepulcros de la Casa Real de Castilla (in Spanish). Instituto Jerónimo Zurita. Consejo Superior de Investigaciones Científicas. OCLC 11366237.
- Collins, Roger (1983). Early Medieval Spain, Unity in Diversity. Macmillan.
- Collins, Roger (2012). Caliphs and Kings: Spain, 796-1031. Wiley Blackwell.
- Díez, Gonzalo Martínez (2005). El condado de Castilla, 711-1038: La Historia Frente a la Leyenda (in Spanish). Vol. I. Marcial Pons Historia.
- Domínguez Sánchez, Santiago (2000). Colección documental del Monasterio de Santa María de Carbajal (1093-1461) (in Spanish). León: Centro de Estudios e investigación «San Isidoro». ISBN 84-87667-42-2.
- Lévi-Provençal, Évariste (1963). Historia de España: España musulmana hasta la caída del califato de Córdoba: 711-1031 de J.C.. Vol. IV. Espasa-Calpe.
- O'Callaghan, Joseph F. (1983). A History of Medieval Spain. Cornell University Press.
- Vallvé Bermejo, Joaquín (2003). Abderramán III: califa de España y Occidente (in Spanish). Ariel. ISBN 84-344-6682-1.

Preceded by Ordoño III	King of León; 956–958	Succeeded by Ordoño IV
Preceded by Ordoño IV	King of León; 960–966	Succeeded by Ramiro III
