= Ramiro III of León =

King of León from 966 to 984

Ramiro III
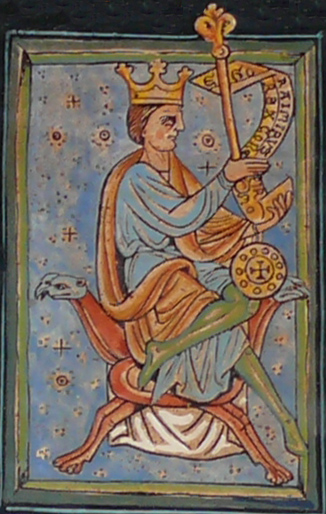
- Ramiro III from the 12th-century Libro de las Estampas

King of León
- Reign: 966–984
- Predecessor: Sancho I
- Successor: Bermudo II
- Regent: Elvira Ramírez; Teresa Ansúrez
- Born: c. 961
- Died: 26 June 985; Destriana
- Burial: Basilica of San Isidoro
- Consort: Sancha Gómez
- Issue: Ordoño Ramírez
- Dynasty: Astur-Leonese dynasty
- Father: Sancho I of León
- Mother: Teresa Ansúrez
- Religion: Chalcedonian Christianity
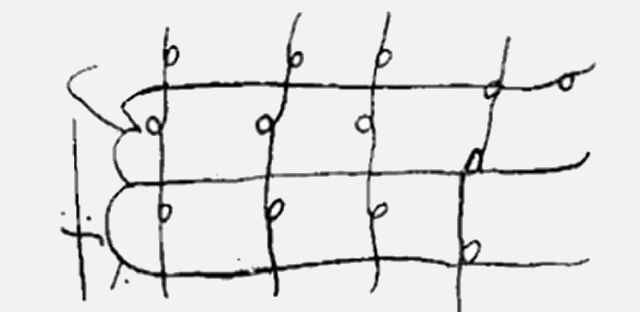
- Signature

Ramiro III (c. 961 – 26 June 985), king of León (966–984), was the son of Sancho the Fat and his successor at the age of only five.

== Family ==
During his minority, the regency was in the hands of two nuns: his aunt Elvira Ramírez, who took the title of queen during the minority, and then his mother Teresa Ansúrez, who had been put in a convent on her husband's death. As a consequence of this, his reign is known for its support of the clergy.

== Reign ==
Among the acts of his regents during his minority was their ratification of a peace treaty with Caliph al-Hakam II; he also confronted Vikings who had invaded Galicia. With the conclusion of the peace treaty, the vizier Almanzor invaded his realm.

Upon reaching his majority and after his wedding to Sancha (d. after 983), perhaps daughter of Gómez Díaz, Count of Saldaña, Ramiro tried to institute an absolutist monarchy which resulted in the alienation of the already separatist Galicia and Castile. This, together with the constant routs experienced at the hands of the Muslims, such as the Battle of Rueda, the Battle of Torrevicente and the worst, which took place at San Esteban de Gormaz under the regency of his aunt in 975, led the Galician nobility in 982 to proclaim Bermudo II, son of Ordoño III, king of Galicia. He lost his throne to Bermudo two years later, in 984. He had at least one child with his wife, Sancha Gómez, Ordoño Ramírez, who married Cristina Bermúdez, daughter of his rival.

Preceded by Sancho I	King of León; 966–984	Succeeded by Bermudo II
