= Pantheon of Asturian Kings =

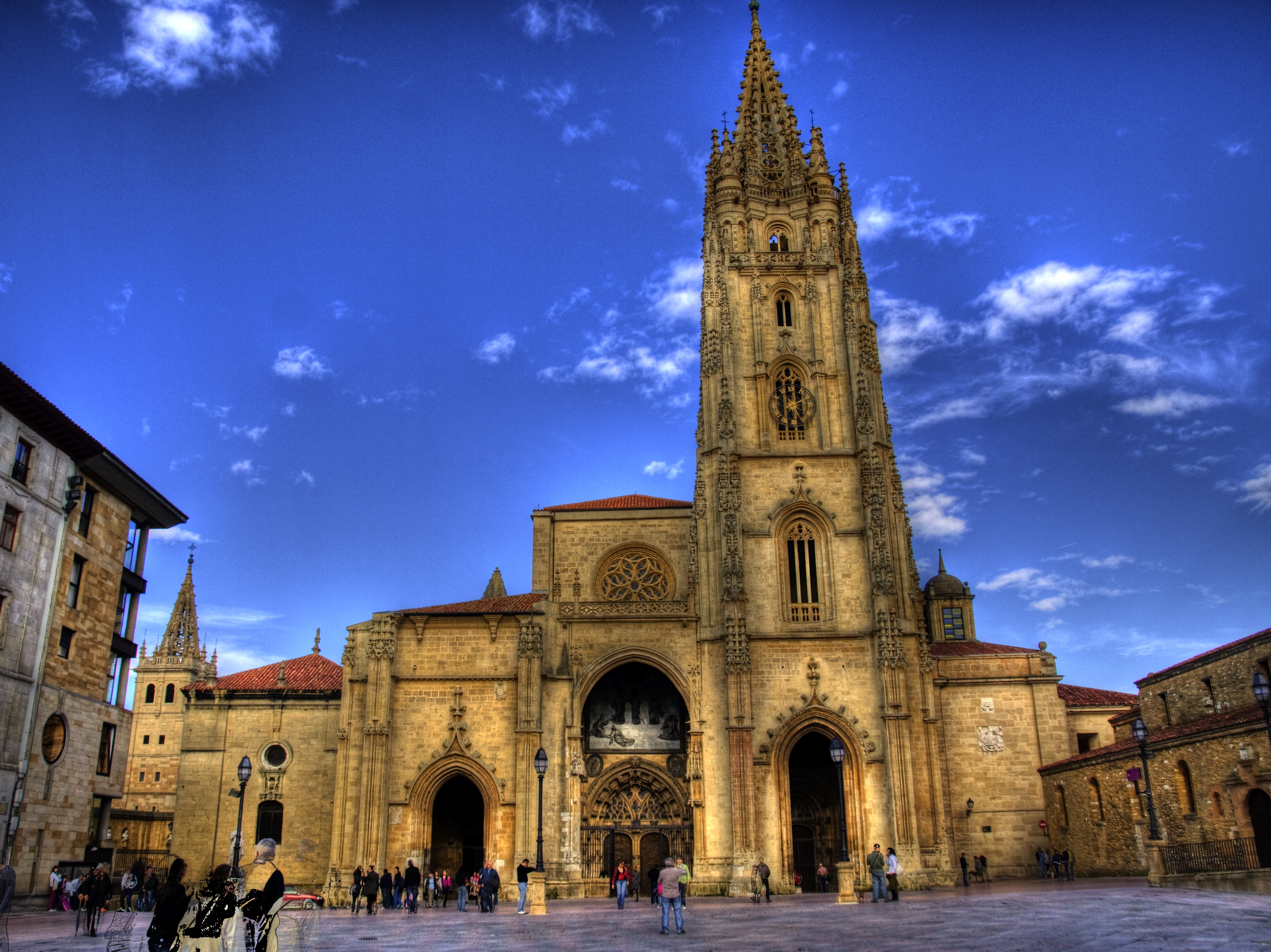
Principal façade of the Cathedral of San Salvador, Oviedo.

The Pantheon of Asturian Kings is a chapel of Nuestra Señora del Rey Casto in the Cathedral of San Salvador, Oviedo, Spain. It is the burial place of many of the rulers of the medieval kingdoms of Asturias and León.

The name Nuestra Señora del Rey Casto ("Our Lady of the Chaste King") alludes to Alfonso II of Asturias, known as "the Chaste", considered the founder of the cathedral. The original royal pantheon was located in the 9th-century Church of Nuestra Señora del Rey Casto on the same site. On the initiative of Tomás Reluz, Bishop of Oviedo, that pantheon and the church were demolished in the early 18th century due to their poor state of conservation. Both were rebuilt and reconsecrated in 1712.

== The primitive Pantheon of Kings of the Cathedral of Oviedo ==
In the 9th century Alfonso II of Asturias, king of Asturias, ordered the erection of a church of Our Lady in his new capital of Oviedo, with the intention of establishing a royal pantheon as a final resting place for himself and his wife, queen Berta. This church later became known in his honor as the Iglesia de Nuestra Señora del Rey Casto ("Church of Our Lady of the Chaste King").

The primitive Pantheon of Kings was located in the narthex of the church. Rather than the church being entered through the narthex as is customary, the main entrance was through a doorway in the southern arm of the church, with the narthex being dedicated entirely as a place of entombment for Asturian monarchs.

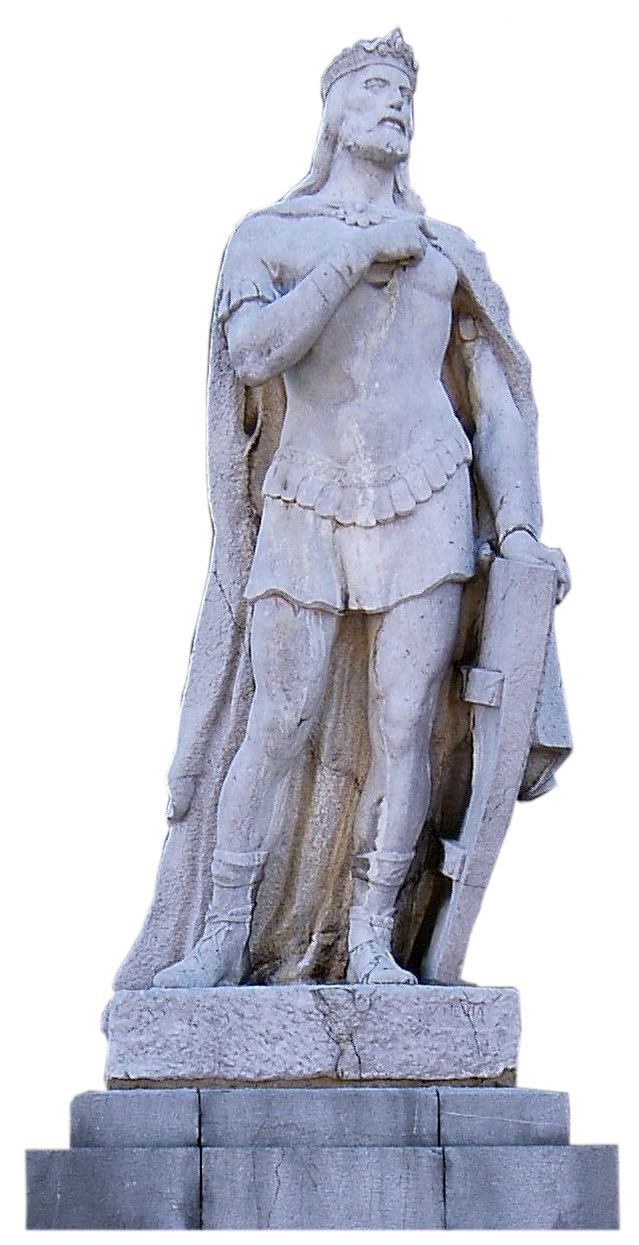
A statue by Víctor Hevia Granda on the portico of the cathedral, representing Alfonso II.

The primitive pantheon was a small oblong room 20 feet (6.1 m) wide (the same width as the principal nave of the church), 12 feet (3.7 m) deep, and somewhere between 8 feet (2.4 m) and 10 feet (3.0 m) in height. The ceiling was of wood, and over the pantheon was the upper choir of the church, which, as in the churches of San Miguel de Lillo and San Salvador de Valdediós, was located in the narthex. On either side of the royal pantheon were small closet-like rooms, one of which contained the staircase to the choir upstairs. The other small room may have been for storage of items used during religious services. The pantheon was connected to the main sanctuary of the church through a wide door near the main altar of the church; a small window also connected the pantheon to the sanctuary. Both, according to the chroniclers of the time, were closed with heavy iron bars that nearly prevented any sunlight from entering the pantheon.

Humble in appearance, the royal pantheon received the bodies of numerous members of the Asturian-Leonese royal family over the course of several centuries. According to the chroniclers of the period, the tombs were quite close together, to the point where it was not possible to walk between them; for lack of space, some members of the royal family were entombed elsewhere in the church. Not all of the bodies were entombed in the walls or in freestanding tombs; some were buried in the floor, their graves covered by unadorned slabs of stone, in most cases without inscriptions.

Near the staircase connecting the church to the upper choir was a tomb that was much venerated in the 16th century, owing to the widespread belief that saints were buried there. Nonetheless, chronicler Ambrosio de Morales believed that by that time the bodies that had been buried there had been removed to another place. The tomb was covered with a marble slab. A worn and nearly illegible Latin inscription read "Adepti...Regna Celestia potiti". It is impossible to know exactly what the inscription may have originally said, but Regna Celestia is "the Kingdom of Heaven" and adepti and potiti both mean "obtained" or "attained".

In the royal pantheon, near the entrance, some 2 feet (0.61 m) above the floor, was a tomb covered by a roughly worked lid without adornment or inscription. Nonetheless, tradition and the preeminent location of the tomb led to general agreement among historians that it was the tomb of Alfonso II, founder of the church and of the royal pantheon.

Several other members of the Asturian-Leonese royal family were entombed elsewhere in the primitive Church of Nuestra Señora del Rey Casto, outside the royal pantheon:

- Fruela I of Asturias (722-768), king of Asturias. Son of Alfonso I of Asturias "the Catholic" and queen Ermesinda.
- Queen Munia de Álava, wife of Fruela I and mother of Alfonso II "the Chaste".
- Queen Elvira Menéndez (?-921), wife of Ordoño II of León and mother of Alfonso IV of León and Ramiro II of León.
- Queen Urraca Sánchez (?-956), wife of Ramiro II and mother of Sancho I of León.
- Queen Teresa Ansúrez (?-997), wife of Sancho I, and mother of Ramiro III of León.

=== The campaign of Almanzor ===
At the greatest extent of Muslim power in Iberia, during the military campaign of Almanzor in the year 986 against the kingdom of León, king Bermudo II of León ("the Gouty") ordered that royal remains be gathered from León, Astorga and other places to the Church of Nuestra Señora del Rey Casto to prevent their profanation by the Muslim armies. These remains were placed in seven wooden boxes and brought to the city of Oviedo. There not being sufficient space for them in the royal pantheon, they were placed in the church. The seven boxes contained the remains of the following individuals:

1. King Alfonso III of Asturias ("the Great") and his wife Jimena of Asturias.
2. Ordoño II of León and his wives Elvira Menéndez and Sancha of Pamplona.
3. Ramiro II of León, Sancho I of León, Teresa Ansúrez, Ordoño III of León and Queen Elvira.
4. Fruela II of León and his first wife Nunilo Jiménez.
5. Queen Elvira.
6. Urraca Sánchez, wife of Ramiro II.
7. The seventh box contained the remains of various infantes and infantas.

After the death of Almanzor, and of his son Abd al-Malik al-Muzaffar, king Alfonso V of León repopulated the city of León, and moved there the greater part of the remains that his father Bermudo II had brought to Oviedo. Nonetheless the remains of kings Alfonso III and Fruela II and queens Jimena, Munia, Elvira Menéndez, Urraca Sánchez and Teresa Ansúrez remained in the royal pantheon in Oviedo.

== The new Pantheon of Kings of the Cathedral of Oviedo ==
=== History ===
Toward the end of the 17th century, the pantheon of kings was basically intact but in a poor state of conservation, as was the primitive Church of Nuestra Señora del Rey Casto, of which it was part. On May 15, 1696, Charles II of Spain issued a royal decree dedicating all benefices derived from Tanes and Brañalonga to the Cathedral of Oviedo with the intent of contributing to the maintenance and restoration of the primitive church. Some years later, in 1705, the council in charge of the cathedral sent a memorial to the king, indicating the continued poor condition of the church and of the royal pantheon; bishop Tomás Reluz sent an accompanying letter recommending the demolition of the primitive church. The proposal was accepted.

Reluz was the principal instigator of the early 18th century construction of the new chapel of Nuestra Señora del Rey Casto. The new pantheon was located between the pillars of the left nave (known in Spanish as the nave del evangelio, "the nave of the Gospel"), enclosed by an iron grate, with light entering through an oval. This disposition has been interpreted as a loss of importance for the function of the royal pantheon to the church, favoring instead the function of the church as a Marian sanctuary. Nonetheless, the location of the new royal pantheon at the foot of the left nave allowed a wider central nave for the new structure.

The contract to construct the new chapel was signed November 10, 1705, by Bishop Reluz and master builder Bernabé de Hazas. Construction costs were estimated at 24,000 ducats and the time for construction at three years. On August 2, 1709, the dome of the new Chapel of Nuestra Señora del Rey Casto, still under construction at that time, collapsed, causing several deaths. The chapel was completed in 1712, although it was not until 1717 that the picture of the Virgin was moved from the Chapel of Santa Barbara in the Cathedral to the new chapel.

=== Description ===
The Royal Pantheon occupies the last section of the northern side of the chapel of Nuestra Señora del Rey Casto in the Cathedral of Oviedo. It is the most sumptuous part of the cathedral complex, richly decorated in carvings of plants and heraldic emblems.

In six niches, among other funerary urns, are the remains of many members of the Asturian-Leonese royal family. A tablet on the chapel wall gives the names of those entombed there, although it contains some errors.

The gratings of the royal pantheon and the church were made by Andrés García Casielles and were put in place in 1713. The grating that closes off access to the Royal Pantheon is adorned with the coat of arms of king Philip V of Spain; a similar grating, but without the royal seal, adorns the Chapel of the Annunciation of the cathedral.

In the center of the Royal Pantheon is a sarcophagus covered by a fifth century marble tombstone. It is the only surviving tomb from the primitive pantheon. Some studies indicate that this sarcophagus was used to transport the remains of the Asturian king Alfonso III ("the Great") and his wife Queen Jimena from the city of Astorga to Oviedo. The sepulchral urn is of ordinary unadorned stone. The overlying cover is marble, coffin-shaped, wider at the head than the feet, and entirely covered in reliefs. A sculpted epitaph in somewhat obscure Latin appears to state that it contains the body of one Ithacius

INCLVSI TENERVM PRAETIOSO MARMORE CORPVS AETERNAM IN SEDE NOMINIS ITHACII

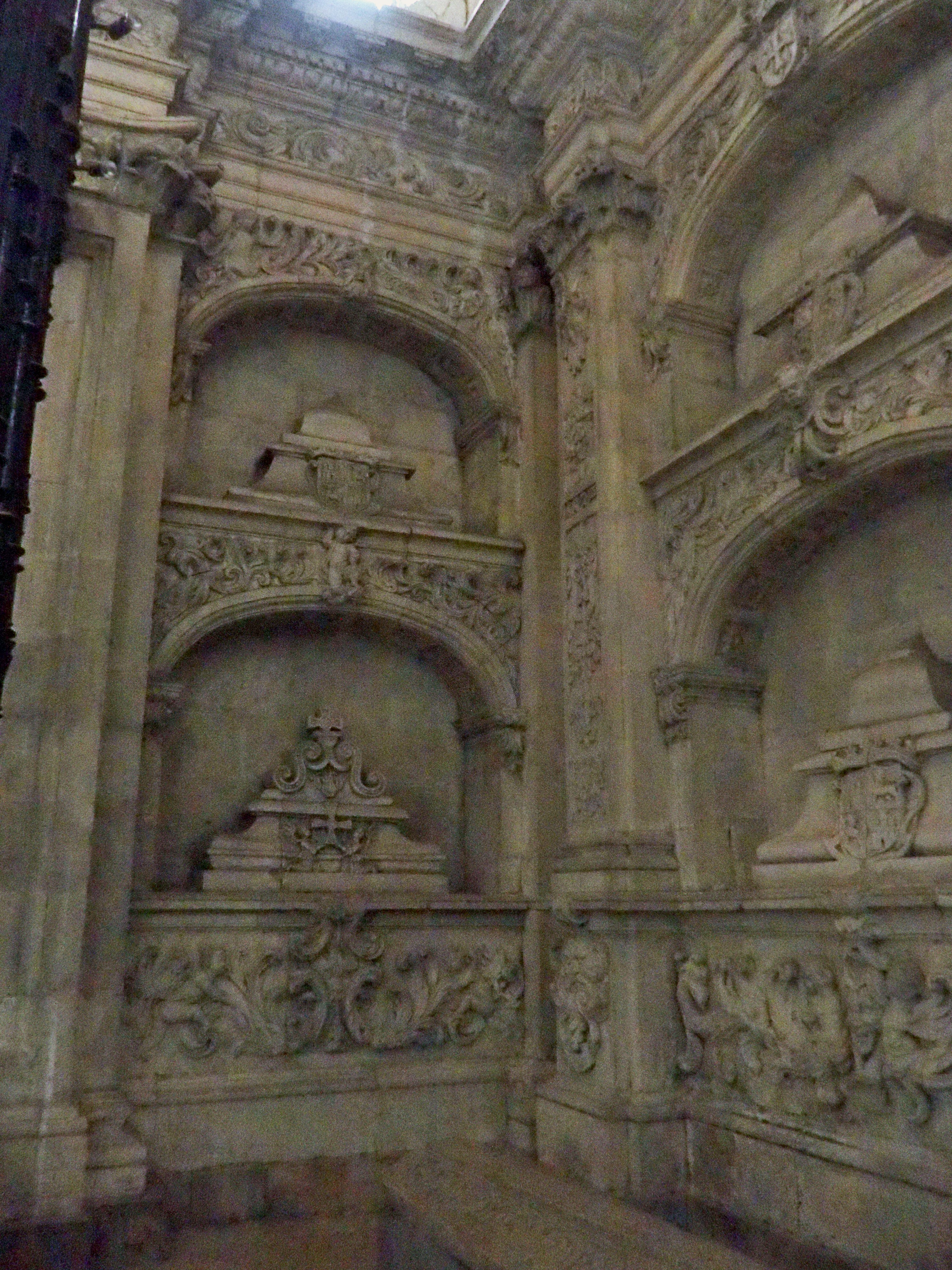
The present-day Royal Pantheon.

At least one possible reading of this is: "I have enclosed a tender body with precious marble in the eternal resting place of the family of Ithacius," but there are various other possibilities (including "...of the fame of Ithacius" and "...by the name of Ithacius"). This tomb was reused in the Royal Pantheon, although the specific identity of the body currently located within it is unclear.

=== Kings and queens entombed in the Royal Pantheon ===
The following members of the Asturian-Leonese royal family are entombed in the baroque urns of the Pantheon, according to various historians:

- Fruela I of Asturias (722-768), king of Asturias. Son of Alfonso I of Asturias ("the Catholic") and queen Ermesinda.
- Bermudo I of Asturias ("the Deacon" ?-797), king of Asturias. Son of Fruela of Cantabria, nephew of Alfonso I of Asturias, and successor to Mauregato of Asturias.
- Alfonso II of Asturias ("the Chaste", 759-842), king of Asturias. Son of Fruela I and grandson of Alfonso I.
- Ramiro I of Asturias (790-850), king of Asturias. Nephew and successor of Alfonso II and son of Bermudo I.
- Ordoño I of Asturias (830-866), king of Asturias. Son and successor of Ramiro I.
- Alfonso III of Asturias ("the Great", 848-910), king of Asturias. Son of Ordoño I and queen Nuña.
- García I of León (871-914), king of León. Son of Alfonso III of Asturias and queen Jimena of Asturias.
- Fruela II of León (c.875-925), king of León. Son of Alfonso III of Asturias and brother of García I of León].
- Queen Munia de Álava, wife of Fruela I and mother of Alfonso II.
- Queen Berta, wife of Alfonso II.
- Queen Nuña, wif of Ordoño I and mother of Alfonso III.
- Queen Jimena of Asturias (?-912), daughter of García Íñiguez de Pamplona, wife of Alfonso III, and mother of García I, Ordoño II and Fruela II.
- Queen Elvira Menéndez (?-921), wife of Ordoño II and mother of Alfonso IV of León and Ramiro II of León.
- Queen Nunilo Jimena, wife of Fruela II.
- Queen Urraca of Pamplona (?-956), wife of King Ramiro II of León and mother of King Sancho I of León.
- Queen Teresa Ansúrez (?-997), wife of King Sancho I of León and mother of King Ramiro III of León.

== See also ==
- Asturian art
- Catholic Church in Spain
