= Savaric II (bishop of Mondoñedo) =

Galician bishop

Savaric II (died after 925/6) was the Bishop of Mondoñedo from 907. The see of Dumio, founded by Martin of Braga, had been transferred to Mondoñedo and Savaric often signed charters as episcopus dumiensis (bishop of Dumio). He educated his great-nephew, Rudesind (born 907), as his own successor.

Savaric was born to a noble family, being son of Gatón, a count in Astorga and El Bierzo who was uncle to King Alfonso III of Asturias. Savaric's sister Ermesenda married Count Hermenegildo Gutiérrez and was grandmother or great-grandmother of three of Savaric's immediate successors in the episcopal see: Rudesind (925–950/955–958), Arias Núnez (950–955/958–962) and Arias Peláez (972–?982).

The historian and cleric Enrique Flórez cited a document of 1 August 922, a donation of Ordoño II to the monastery of Samos, as the last record of Savaric alive and placed his death on 18 November 922. However, on 17 September 924 Savaric confirmed Fruela II's donation of the county of Montanos to the church of Santiago de Compostela. On 9 March 925 Savaric's successor was still not a bishop. Savaric's death occurred between this date and 25 May 927, when Rudesind was already bishop. Since Rudesind ordered the monks of Celanova to perform services in Savaric's memory on Saint Roman's day (18 November), this must be the date of his death, but whether in 925 or 926 we do not know. Savaric's reputed successor Reccared is a phantom, probably an error stemming from the fact that Lugo at that time was ruled by a bishop Reccared.

== Notes ==
Catholic Church titles
| Preceded by Rudesind I | Bishop of Dumium; 907–925/926 | Succeeded by Rudesind II |
