= Gutier Menéndez =

Galician magnate

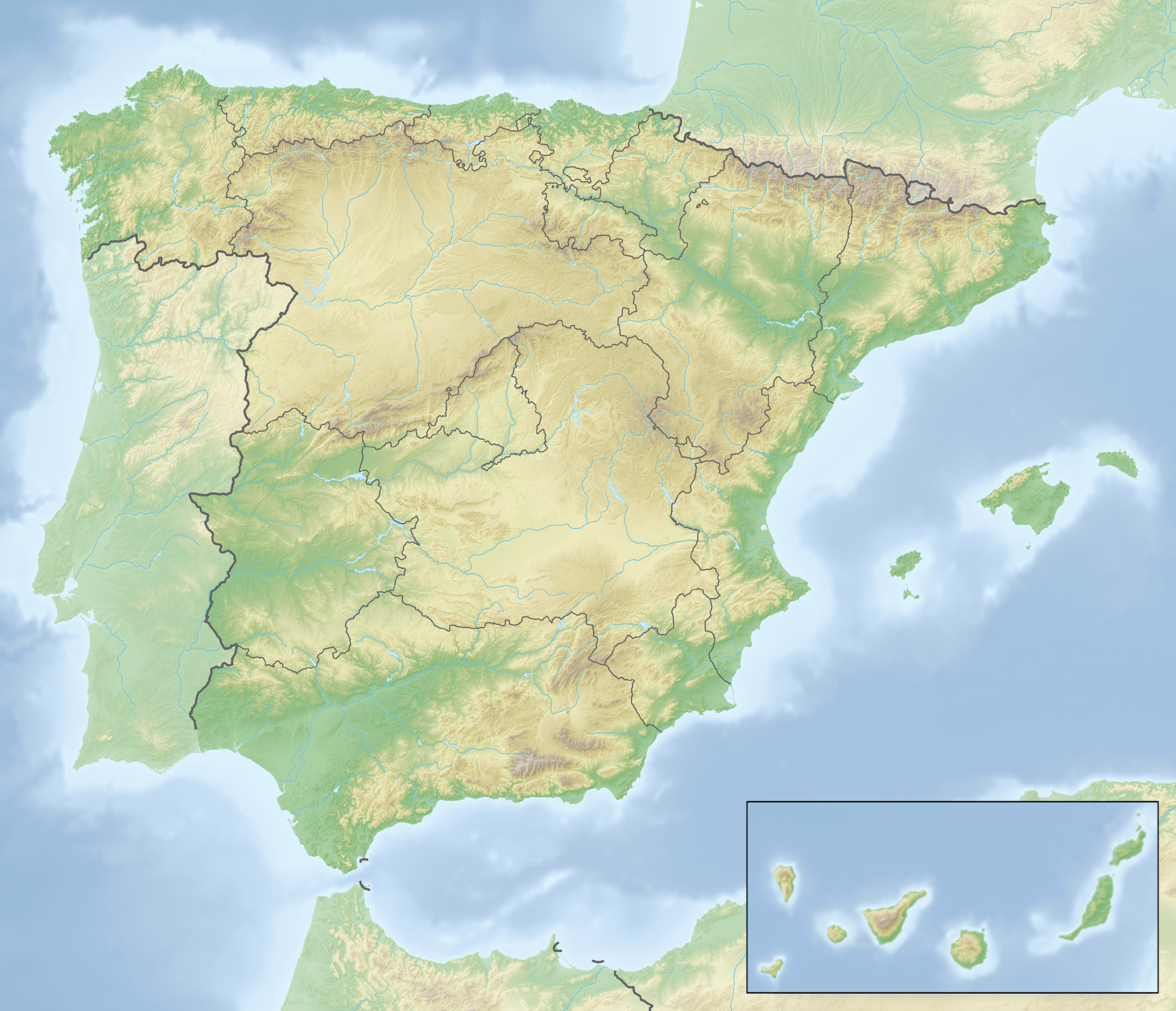
Gutier's world (on a map of modern Spain)
The red dots represent the six Galician counties (conmissos) entrusted to Gutier by Alfonso IV in 929. The blue dots represent the location of Gutier's known residences, also the locations of the monasteries of Loyo (restored by him) and Celanova (founded by his son).

Gutier Menéndez (Note: Also spelled "Gutierre Menéndez" (or "Guterre Mendes" in Portuguese), from medieval Latin Guttiher Menendiz. The surname is a patronymic meaning "son of Hermenegildo".) (c. 865 – 934) was the most powerful Galician magnate of his time in the Kingdom of León. Related to the royal family through marriages, he acted as a powerbroker in the civil wars that followed the disputed succession of 925.

== Family ==
Gutier could not have been born much later than 870, since he had an adult son in 911. He was a son of Count Hermenegildo Gutiérrez and Hermesinda Gatóñez. His paternal grandparents were Gutier and Elvira, while his maternal grandparents were Count Gatón and Egilo. Gatón's sister, Nuña, was the wife of King Ordoño I, while Gutier's sister Elvira was the wife of Ordoño II.

Gutier married Ilduara Ériz, daughter of Count Ero Fernández and Adosinda. They were probably married no later than 890, judging by the ages of their children. They had three sons and two daughters:

- Munio (fl. 911–55), count, married his cousin Elvira Arias, daughter of count Arias Menéndez, Gutier's brother. One of their daughters, Goto Muñoz, was the wife of King Sancho Ordóñez.
- Rudesind (fl. 916–77), abbot of Celanova and bishop of Mondoñedo, later regarded as a saint.
- Fruela (fl. 935–42), count, married Sarracina, grandparents of Tota, wife of count Menendo González. They were apparently also ancestors of the House of Traba, though the precise connection is disputed.
- Adosinda (fl. 934–64), her first husband was count Jimeno Díaz, son of count Diego Fernández. After his death, she married his nephew, Ramiro Menéndez, with whom she had several children. They were probably the parents of Queen Velasquita Ramírez, wife of Bermudo II of León.
- Hermesinda (fl. 929–34) the wife of Count Pelayo González, son of Count Gonzalo Betótez and brother of Count Hermenegildo González. One of their daughters, Ilduara Peláez, was the wife of Count Gonzalo Menéndez.

In their testament, dated 934, Gutier and Ilduara, with the support of their relatives, divided their property roughly equally between their five children in a so-called colmellum divisionis, a division of property within a branch of a family. In the will, Gutier says that during his career he obtained wealth through "royal grants, booty in war and other means" (de munificentia regis, de preda vel de ex aliquo ganato) on top of the wealth that he had inherited.

Gutier's immense wealth is indicated by the aforementioned testament and a gift of land to his wife made on 16 August 916. He gave her lands not only in Galicia, the family's power base, but also in Portugal to the south and Asturias to the east.

== Career ==
During the reign of his brother-in-law, Ordoño II, king of Galicia from 910 and then of León from 914 until his death in 924, Gutier was a regular presence at the royal court. He is attested as a signatory and intervenor in numerous royal acts, and during this period his activity was not restricted to Galicia.

Ordoño II was succeeded without incident by his younger brother, Fruela II. On Fruela's death the following year (925), however, a civil war broke out between the sons of Ordoño, who were Gutier's nephews. The eldest son, Sancho Ordóñez, briefly established himself at León, but by 926 he was restricted to Galicia, while his younger brother, Alfonso IV, ruled in León. In December 927, the two kings, apparently reconciled, met to confirm the restoration of the monastery of Santa María de Loyo in the suburbs of Lugo by Gutier and Ilduara. In the royal presence, Gutier presided over the council. The situation suggests that Gutier's intervention may have reconciled the two kings, or even that he was acting as regent of the kingdom.

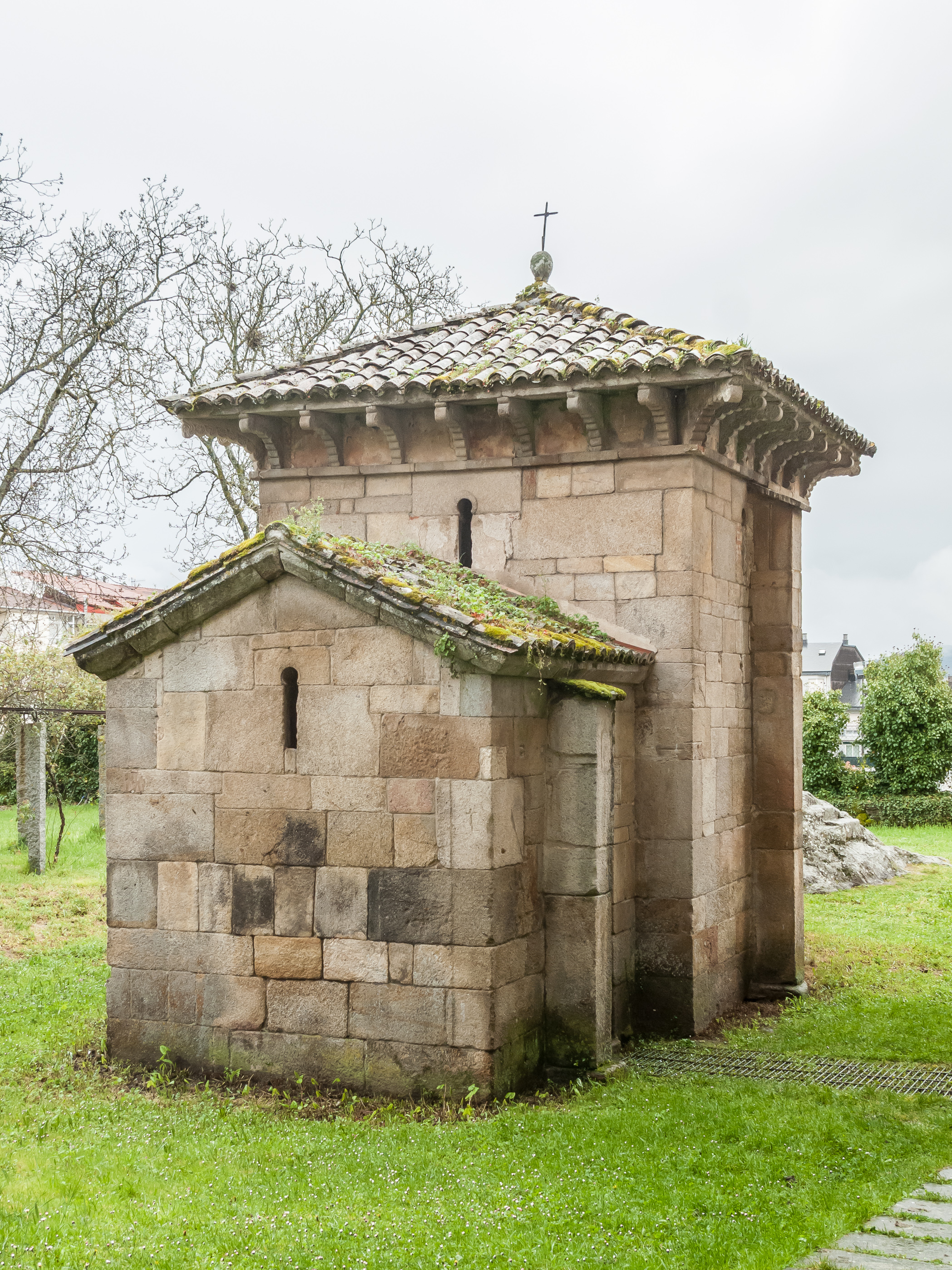
Saint Michel chapel on San Salvator of Celanova Monastery, built by Gutier Menéndez son Rudesind between 937 and 942.

In 927, Sancho granted Gutier the villa of Villare, which neighboured Gutier's house in Vilanova dos Infantes. Gutier's son Rudesind later built the abbey of Celanova on the land at Villare. Besides his house or palace (domus) at Vilanova, Gutier owned another at Portomarín.

Upon Sancho's death in 929, Alfonso IV took over direct rule in Galicia. On 16 August, he rewarded Gutier for his continued support with rule over six counties (Note: The word for a county in contemporary Galician documents is conmisso or commissum (plural commissa). On the institution, see Julio Puyol, Orígenes del Reino de León y de sus instituciones políticas (Madrid: 1926), p. 176.) in Galicia: Quiroga, Santiago de Castillón, Lor, Saviñao, Louseiro and Ortigueira. The first five were all located within the Terra de Lemos not far from Lugo, while Ortigueira is on the northern coast. All are in Galicia. A document of 942, written after the death of Gutier and his brother Arias, show that they had once governed even more counties (commissa) and deaneries (decanías). (Note: These were rural properties belonging to monasteries.) The document mentions Lor and Quiroga, but also lists Bubal, Ladra, Limia, Paramo, Salnés, Sorga and Triós in Galicia, as well as Refojos de Leza further south in the county of Portugal.

Gutier witnessed many other royal acts of Alfonso IV until his overthrow by his younger brother, Ramiro II in 931. Gutier may have had a large role in Alfonso's overthrow, since he witnessed many acts of Ramiro from 931 until his death. By contrast most of the magnates who backed Alfonso against his brother were marginalized following Ramiro's victory.

== Bibliography ==
- Alfonso, Isabel (2004). "Judicial Rhetoric and Political Legitimation in Medieval León-Castile". In Isabel Alfonso; Hugh Kennedy; Julio Escalona (eds.). Building Legitimacy: Political Discourses and Forms of Legitimacy in Medieval Societies. Brill. pp. 51–88.
- Collins, Roger (2012). Caliphs and Kings: Spain, 796–1031. London: Wiley Blackwell. ISBN 978-1-118-73001-0.
- García Álvarez, Manuel Rubén (1960). "¿La Reina Velasquita, nieta de Muniadomna Díaz?" (PDF). Revista de Guimarães (in Spanish). No. 70. Guimarães. pp. 197–230. ISSN 0871-0759. Archived from the original (PDF) on 2013-10-06.
- Isla Frez, Amancio (2015). "The Aristocracy and the Monarchy in Northwest Iberia between the Eighth and the Eleventh Century". In James D'Emilio (ed.). Culture and Society in Medieval Galicia: A Cultural Crossroads at the Edge of Europe. Leiden: Brill. pp. 251–80.
- López Sangil, José Luis (2007). "La nobleza altomedieval gallega. La familia Froílaz-Traba. Sus fundaciones monacales en Galicia en los siglos XI, XII y XIII" (PDF). Nalgures. 4. La Coruña: Asociación Cultural de Estudios Históricos de Galicia: 241–331. ISSN 1885-6349.
- Mattoso, José (1981). A nobreza medieval portuguesa, a família e o poder (in Portuguese). Lisbon: Editorial Estampa. OCLC 8242615.
- Pallares Méndez, María del Carmen; Portela Silva, Ermelindo (1989). "Elementos para el análisis de la aristocracia medieval de Galicia: parentesco y patrimonio" (PDF). El Museo de Pontevedra. 43: 39–54.
- Portass, Robert (2013). "All Quiet on the Western Front? Royal Politics in Galicia from c.800 to c.950". Early Medieval Europe. 21 (3): 283–306. doi:10.1111/emed.12019.
- Sáez Sánchez, Emilio (1948). "Los ascendientes de San Rosendo: notas para el estudio de la monarquía astur-leonesa durante los siglos IX y X". Hispania. 30. Madrid: CSIC, Instituto Jerónimo Zurita. OCLC 682814356.
- Torres Sevilla-Quiñones de León, Margarita Cecilia (1999). Linajes nobiliarios de León y Castilla: Siglos IX-XIII. Salamanca: Junta de Castilla y León, Consejería de educación y cultura. ISBN 84-7846-781-5.
