= Monastery of San Xulián de Samos =

Monastery in Samos, Spain

Coordinates: 42°43′55″N 7°19′34″W

- Mosteiro de San Xulián de Samos
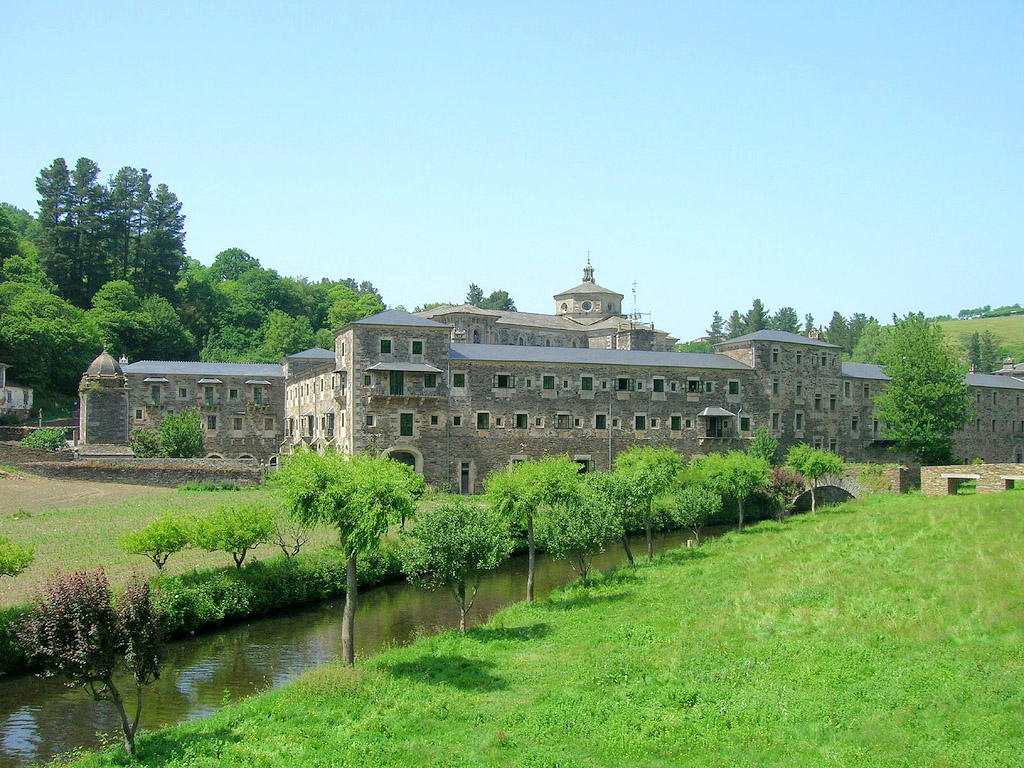
- General view of the monastery.

Religion
- Affiliation: Roman Catholic
- Ecclesiastical or organizational status: Monastery

Location
- Location: Samos, Galicia, Spain
- Interactive map of Monastery of San Xulián de Samos

Architecture
- Style: Gothic, Renaissance, Baroque
- Direction of façade: Southwest

Website
- Official website

The Monastery of San Xulián de Samos (Galician: Mosteiro de San Xulián de Samos; Spanish: Monasterio de San Julián de Samos) is an active Benedictine monastery in Samos, Galicia, Spain. It was founded in the sixth century.

The monastery was the School of Theology and Philosophy. It is also an important stop on the Way of Saint James, a pilgrimage leading to the shrine of the apostle Saint James the Great.

== History ==
The foundation is attributed to Martin of Braga. It is known to have been renovated by Saint Fructuoso in the seventh century. However, the first written mention of this event is from the year 665. An inscription on the walls of the cloister of the lodge says that the Bishop of Lugo Ermefredo rebuilt it. After this restoration it was abandoned before the Muslim invasion until the reconquest of King Fruela I of Asturias, which took place around 760. When, years later, he was assassinated, his widow and son, the future Alfonso II of Asturias, the Chaste, found refuge in the monastery. That earned the monastery royal protection, starting with the properties in a half-mile radius, which would encourage growth.

In the early tenth century, the bishop of Lugo, Don Ero, attempted to seize control and expelled the monks. The Counts Arias Menéndez and Gutierre Menéndez, children of Hermenegildo Menéndez, were required to repopulate the new monastery with monks. Thereafter there were good relations between the monastery and the Count's family.

In the same century it was reoccupied at the behest of King Ordoño II of León. From 960 the community lived under the rule of St. Benedict, but in the twelfth century the Cluniac reform joined with Bishop Don Juan. The monastery of Samos enjoyed great importance during the Middle Ages, which is reflected by its two hundred villas and five hundred sites. In 1558, already incorporated into the Royal San Benito of Valladolid, the monastery suffered a fire that forced its complete rebuilding. The community was dispossessed in 1836, with the confiscation of Mendizabal, but the Benedictine monks returned in 1880.

It suffered another fire in 1951, after which it had to be rebuilt again.

== Description ==
There are several architectural styles: late Gothic, Renaissance and Baroque.

== See also ==
- Way of Saint James
