= Ero Fernández =

Galician magnate

- Tenant-in-chief of Lugo
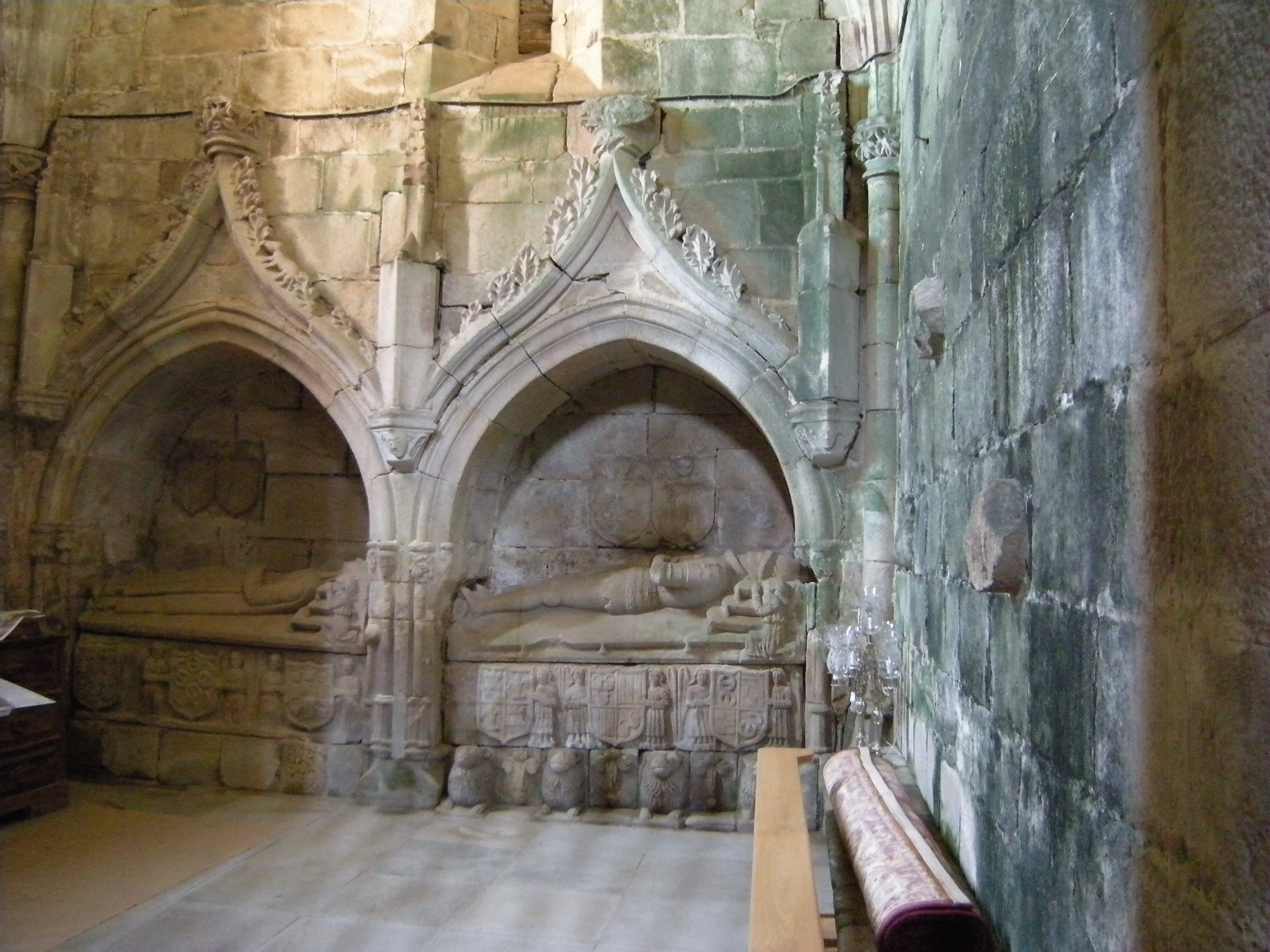
- Funerary chapel of Count Ero Fernández and countess Elvira in the Monastery of Ferreira de Pallares
- Died: c. 926
- Spouses: Adosinda of Monterroso, Elvira
- Issue: Gundesindo Ériz, Ilduara Ériz, Diego Ériz, Godesteo Ériz, Teresa Ériz, Goto Ériz
- Father: Fernando

Ero Fernández (died c. 926) was a Galician magnate, count in Lugo, grandfather of St. Rudesind, and ancestor of several noble Galician and Portuguese lineages who married into the highest ranks of the nobility of the kingdoms of León and Castile.

== Biography ==
His filiation has not been documented; from his patronymic it is known that his father was named Fernando and the presence of another count at court named Diego Fernández, ancestor of a powerful family in northern Portugal, has led to the two being viewed as powerful brothers. Count Ero lived during the reigns of Alfonso III and his successors and held the title of count from the end of the 9th century and the first decades of the following century. His presence in the curia regia of King Alfonso is confirmed in a charter issued by the king on 30 September 899 when he donated several villages in the territory of Coimbra to the Cathedral of Santiago de Compostela.

He was the tenant-in-chief of Lugo and on 7 July 910, while in this region, he confirmed a document addressed to King Ordoño II whereby he and several other counts promised to rebuild the homes that had been destroyed in the city. A year later, on 22 April 911, he witnessed a charter of King Ordoño confirming to the Cathedral of Santiago the donations that had been made by his predecessors.

Count Ero was a great benefactor of monasteries. With his second wife Elvira he founded the Monastery of Ferreira de Pallares where he retired while Elvira was still alive. He appears for the last time on 24 September 926 confirming the bride token given by Gunterico Arias to Eros's granddaughter Gontrodo González. He probably died shortly afterwards and was buried at the Monastery of Ferreira de Pallares which he had founded.

== Marriages and issue ==
Ero Fernández married twice. From his first marriage with Adosinda of Monterroso (died before 898), he had two children:

- Gundesindo Ériz, who married Enderquina "Palla" Menéndez, daughter of count Hermenegildo Gutiérrez and Ermesinda Gatónez, with whom he had numerous descendants.
- Ilduara Ériz, wife of count Gutier Menéndez of Coimbra, also the son of Hermenegildo Gutiérrez. This couple had several children, including St. Rudesind, founder of the Monastery of San Salvador de Celanova, and bishop of Mondoñedo. Among their descendants were queens Elvira Menéndez and (probably) Velasquita Ramírez of León.

Around 898, he married again, this time to countess Elvira, who made a generous donation that year to the Monastery of Ferreira de Pallares which both had founded. The children of this marriage were:

- Diego Ériz. In 917 his mother Elvira made a donation for his soul. He is believed to be the father Nepociano and Gundesinda Díaz, although there is no convincing documentary evidence of this parentage.
- Godesteo Ériz (died in 939), married to Gugina with whom he had five children. As a widow, Gugina made a donation for her husband's soul, mentioning count Ero and Elvira as her parents. Based on this document, some historians, such as Emilio Sáez, believed that she was their daughter, although other documents indicate that she was actually their daughter-in-law.

He had two other daughters, although it is not certain from which of his two marriages:

- Teresa Ériz, wife of Gonzalo Betótez, count in Deza, and the parents of, among others, Queen Aragonta, briefly wife of King Ordoño II; count Pelayo González of Deza; and count Hermenegildo González. They were also ancestors of queens Elvira Menéndez and (probably) Velasquita Ramírez.
- Goto Ériz, wife of a Munio, possibly the parents of Ero Muñoz.

== Bibliography ==
- López Sangil, José Luis (2001). "La fundación del Monasterio de San Salvador de Cines" (PDF). Anuario Brigantino (in Spanish). No. 24. Betanzos. pp. 139–156. ISSN 1133-1240. OCLC 402770925.
- Mattoso, Jose João de Conceizao Gonzalves (1968). "As Familias Condals Portucalenses dos seculos X e XI". Studium Generale (in Portuguese). 12: 59–115.
- Rey Caiña, José Ángel (1992). "Abadalogio del Monasterio de Santa María de Ferreira de Pallares" (PDF). Boletín do Museo Provincial de Lugo (in Spanish). No. V. Lugo. pp. 55–89. ISSN 0212-8438.
- Sáez, Emilio (1947). "Los ascendientes de San Rosendo: notas para el estudio de la monarquía astur-leonesa durante los siglos IX y X". Hispania: Revista española de Historia (in Spanish) (XXX). Madrid: CSIC, Instituto Jerónimo Zurita: 139–156. OCLC 682814356.
- Salazar y Acha, Jaime de (1989). "Los descendientes del conde Ero Fernández, fundador del Monasterio de Santa María de Ferreira de Pallares". El Museo de Pontevedra (in Spanish) (43): 67–86. ISSN 0210-7791.
- Torres Sevilla-Quiñones de León, Margarita Cecilia (1999). Linajes nobiliarios de León y Castilla: Siglos IX-XIII (in Spanish). Salamanca: Junta de Castilla y León, Consejería de educación y cultura. ISBN 84-7846-781-5.
