= Diogo Fernandes (count) =

Spanish count

Diogo Fernandes (died before 1 December 928), (Spanish: Diego Fernández) was a count in the Kingdom of León whose filiation has not been documented although, from his patronymic, it is known that his father was named Fernando, and that he was possibly from Castile. He is the ancestor of many of the important 10th and 11th century noble families in the County of Portugal and in the Kingdom of León. Although the relationship has not been documented, some authors believe that Diego could have been the brother of Count Ero Fernández and of Gudesteo Fernández.

== Life ==
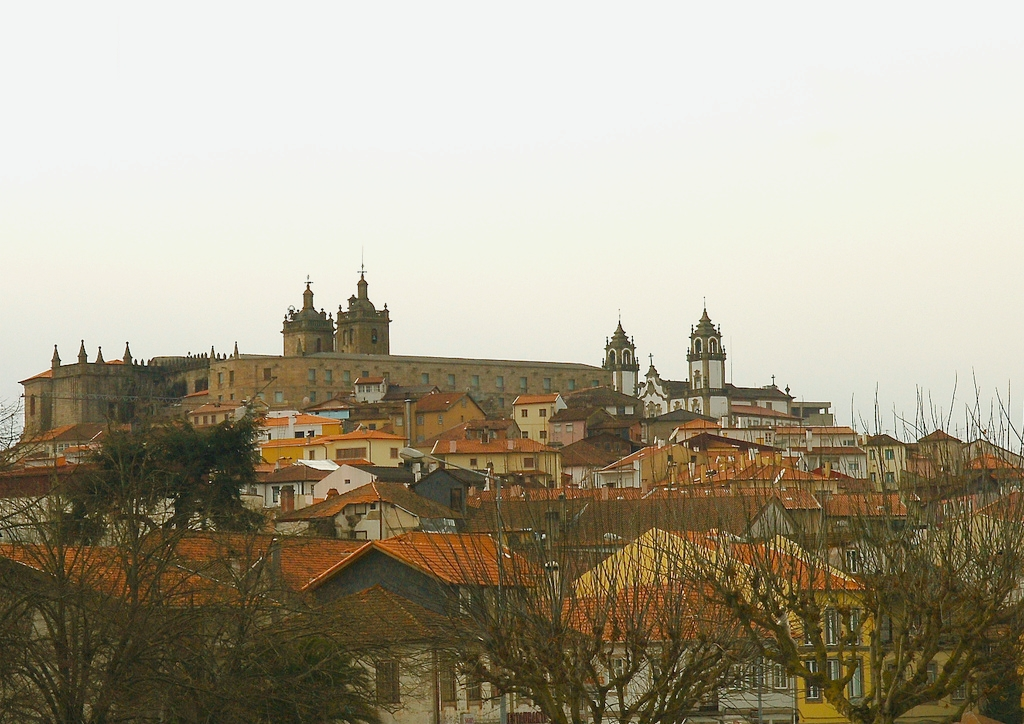
View of Viseu, the city where King Ramiro II of León established his court

Diogo arrived at the county of Portugal near the end of the 9th century, accompanying, according to Sampiro, Infante Bermudo Ordóñez, the son of Ordoño I of Asturias, who after rebelling against his brother King Alfonso III, fled to Coimbra where he lived and died shortly before 928. Count Diego appears for the first time in medieval charters on 28 April 909, confirming a donation made by King Alfonso III. He was also a member of the curia regis of King Ordoño II of León and of his successor Fruela II. He accompanied King Ramiro II when he established his court in Viseu and his last appearance was on 23 February 926 when he confirmed a donation made by this monarch to Hermenegildo González and his wife Mumadona, Diogo's daughter.

== Marriage and issue ==
He married Onecca, whose origins are not recorded in contemporary sources. She is sometimes called Onneca Lucides and made daughter of Portuguese count Lucídio Vimaranes, but this appears to have arisen through confusion with Onneca's great-granddaughter of the same name, the daughter of Lucídio Aloítez. Based on her Basque rather than Galician name, along with those of her son Jimeno and other descendants, Onneca may have been from Pamplona. King Ramiro II of León would call Muniadomna Dias his tia (aunt or older kinswoman). Taken together with her use of the name Leodegundia for a daughter, this led Pérez de Urbel to conclude that she was a member of the royal house of Pamplona, born to the infanta Leodegundia Ordóñez, thought to have been daughter of Ordoño I of Asturias and, as implied by a celebratory poem in the Códice de Roda, a bride in Pamplona. In this he has been followed by other scholars.

Onecca appears in December 928 making a donation to the Monastery of Lorvão with her four children, Munia, Ledegundia, Ximeno, and Mummadomna, who confirm the donation, also confirmed by Hermenegildo González, the husband of Mumadona, and Rodrigo Tedoniz, probable husband of Leodegundia Díaz. Onecca made the donation for the soul of Veremudo dive memorie who has been confused with King Bermudo II of León but refers to Bermudo Ordoñez, son of Ordoño I who lived in the County of Portugal and would have been the brother of Leodegundia, Onecca's possible mother.

The children of this marriage were:

- Munia Díaz, the wife of Alvito Lucides, and parents of Lucídio Alvites, married to Jimena, who had a daughter named Onecca (Onega) Lucides who is often confused with Munia's mother, Onecca, the wife of Diogo Fernandes.
- Leodegundia Díaz, probably the wife of Rodrigo Tedoniz who also confirms the donation made in 928.
- Jimeno Díaz (d. between November and December 961), Count and an important figure in the 10th-century, before February 949, he married Adosinda Gutiérrez, daughter of Gutier Menéndez and Ilduara Ériz, with issue. After Jimeno's death, Adosinda married Ramiro Menéndez, son of count Hermenegildo González, and by Ramiro was probably the mother of Queen Velasquita Ramírez.
- Mumadona Dias, who appears for the first time in February 926 as the wife of Count Hermenegildo González.

== Bibliography ==
- Cardozo, Mário (1962). "Sería Mumadona tia de Ramiro II, Rei de Leão?" (PDF). Revista de Guimarães (in Portuguese). 72 (2–3). Sociedade Martins Sarmento: 376–391. Archived from the original (PDF) on 2015-09-23.
- García Álvarez, Manuel Rubén (1960). "¿La Reina Velasquita, nieta de Muniadomna Díaz?" (PDF). Revista de Guimarães (in Spanish). 70: 197–230. Archived from the original (PDF) on 2013-10-06.
- Mattoso, José (1981a). "As famílias condais portucalenses dos séculos X e XII". A nobreza medieval portuguesa: a família e o poder (in Portuguese). (Originally published in Studium Generale 12 (1968-1969) pp. 59–115). Lisbon: Editorial Estampa. pp. 101–157. OCLC 8242615.
- Mattoso, José (1981b). "A nobreza portucalense dos séculos IX a XI". A nobreza medieval portuguesa: a família e o poder (in Portuguese). (Originally published in Do Tempo e da História 3 (1970) pp. 35–50). Lisbon: Editorial Estampa. pp. 255–268. OCLC 8242615.
- Pérez de Urbel, Justo (1951). "Jimenos y Velas en Portugal". Revista Portuguesa de História (in Spanish). 5 (5): 475–492. hdl:10316.2/47088.
- Pérez de Urbel, Justo (1954). "Lo viejo y lo nuevo sobre el origin del Reino de Pamplona". Al-Andalus (in Spanish). 19: 1–42.
- Sáez, Emilio (1947). "Los ascendientes de San Rosendo: notas para el estudio de la monarquía astur-leonesa durante los siglos IX y X". Hispania: Revista española de Historia (in Spanish) (XXX). Madrid: CSIC, Instituto Jerónimo Zurita: 139–156. OCLC 682814356.
- Salazar y Acha, Jaime de (1989). "Los descendientes del conde Ero Fernández, fundador de Monasterio de Santa María de Ferreira de Pallares". El Museo de Pontevedra (in Spanish) (43): 67–86. ISSN 0210-7791.
- Torres Sevilla-Quiñones de León, Margarita Cecilia (1999). Linajes nobiliarios de León y Castilla: Siglos IX-XIII (in Spanish). Salamanca: Junta de Castilla y León, Consejería de educación y cultura. ISBN 84-7846-781-5.
- Ubieto Arteta, Antonio (1992). "El Matrimonio de la Reina Leodegundia" (PDF). Medievalia (in Spanish). 10. Universitat Autònoma de Barcelona, Institut d'Estudis Medievals: 451–454. doi:10.5565/rev/medievalia.297.
