= Arias Menéndez =

Count of Coimbra

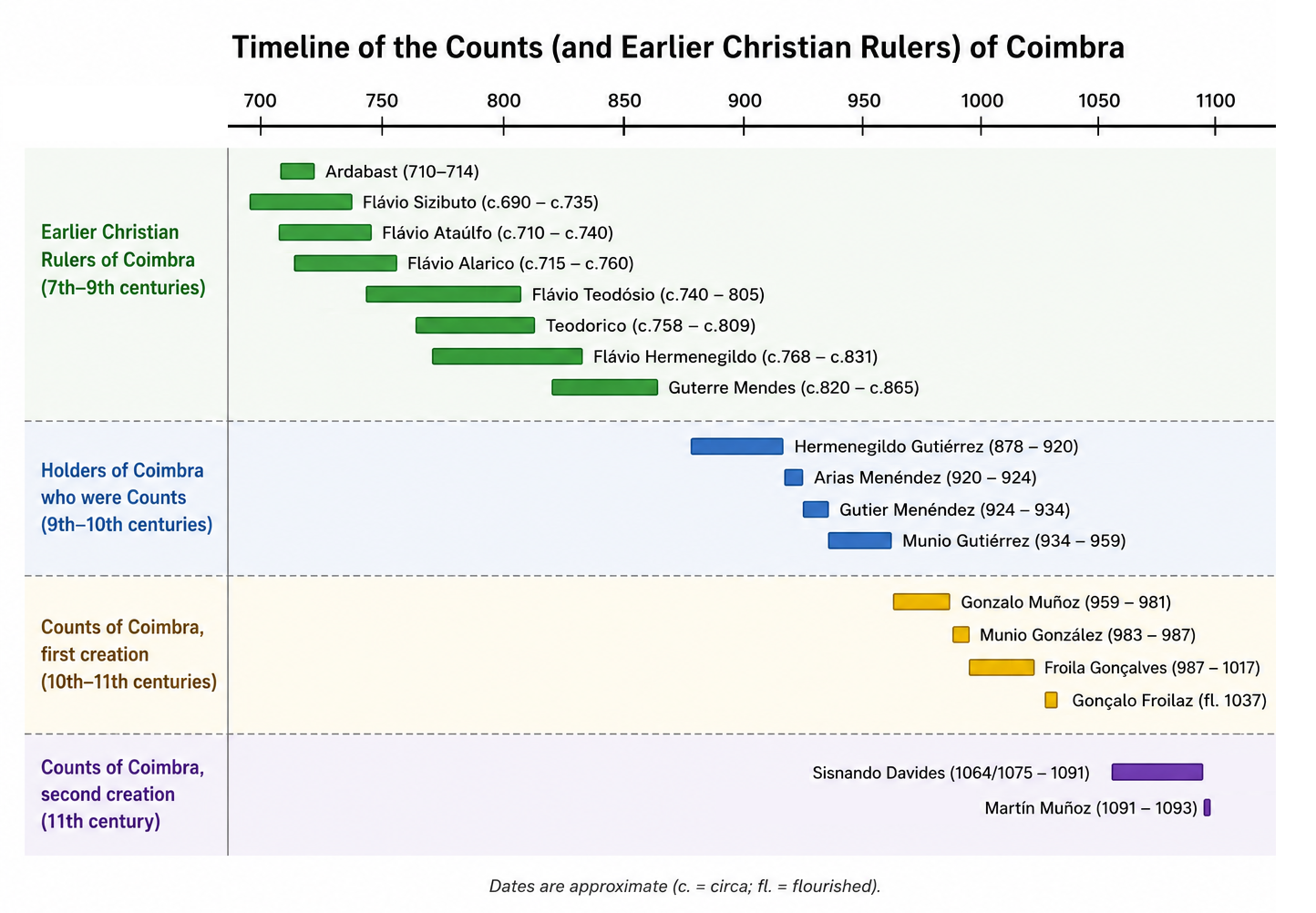
Timeline of the Counts of Coimbra

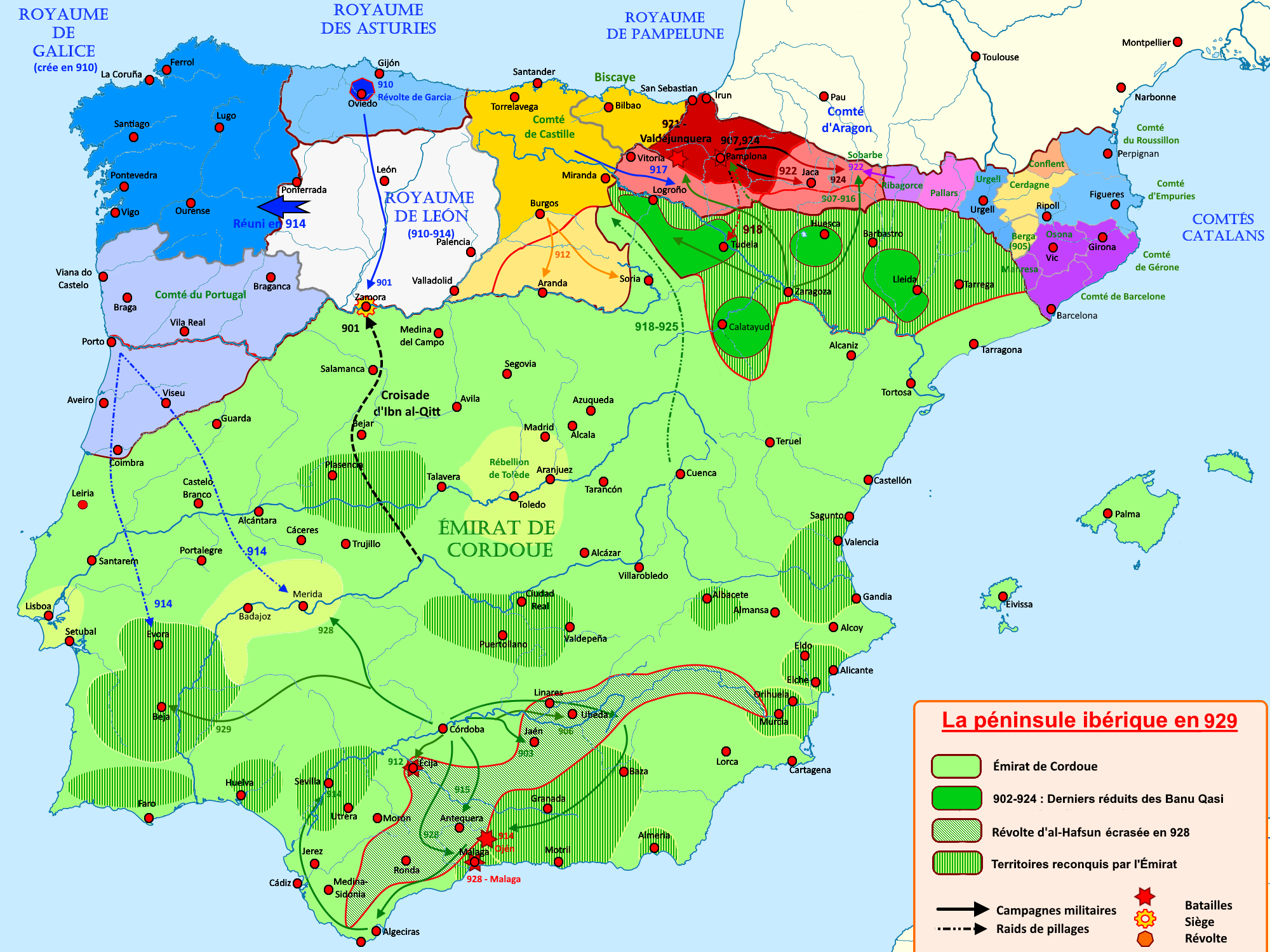
Iberian Peninsula around Arias Menéndez time

Arias Menéndez (Portuguese: Arias Mendes, Galician: Arias Menendiz; died after June 924) was the son of Hermenegildo Gutiérrez and Ermesenda Gatónez, daughter of count Gatón of Bierzo and Astorga.

He supported the cause of King Alfonso III of Asturias and, as compensation for his loyalty, in 911 he was elected Count of Coimbra, which was repopulated by his father.

Years later, he was appointed, along with his brother Gutierre Menéndez, Count of Caldelas, Refojos de Leça, Lor, Quiroga, Búbal, Triós, Limia, Salnés, Paramo, Ladra, Sorga in Galicia, as well as Refojos de Leza further south in the county of Portugal. With his brother Guterre, he brought monks to restore the monastery of Samos in Galicia and, from that moment, a prosperous relationship began between the comital family and the monastery.

== Marriage and descent ==
He married Ermesenda Gundesíndez, daughter of Gudensindo Ériz (son of Ero Fernández) and Enderquina Menéndez, daughter of Hermenegildo Gutiérrez, thus being his niece. From this marriage the following children were born:

- Elvira Arias (died after 962), married Munio Gutiérrez, her cousin, son of Count Gutierre Menéndez and Countess Ilduara Ériz
- Inderquina Arias

== See also ==
- County of Coimbra
- Monastery of San Xulián de Samos
