= Hermenegildo González =

Galician count

Count of Portugal
- Tenure: c. 924-950
- Predecessor: Lucídio Vimaranes
- Successor: Gonzalo Menéndez
- Other names: Mendo I Gonçalves, Ermegildus Gundisaluis
- Died: Between 943 and 950
- Spouse: Mumadona Dias
- Issue: Gonzalo Menéndez, Diego Menéndez, Ramiro Menéndez, Onecca Menéndez, Nuño Menéndez, Arias Menéndez
- Father: Gonçalo Betotes
- Mother: Teresa Eriz

The O Deza region in Galicia governed by Count Hermenegildo González

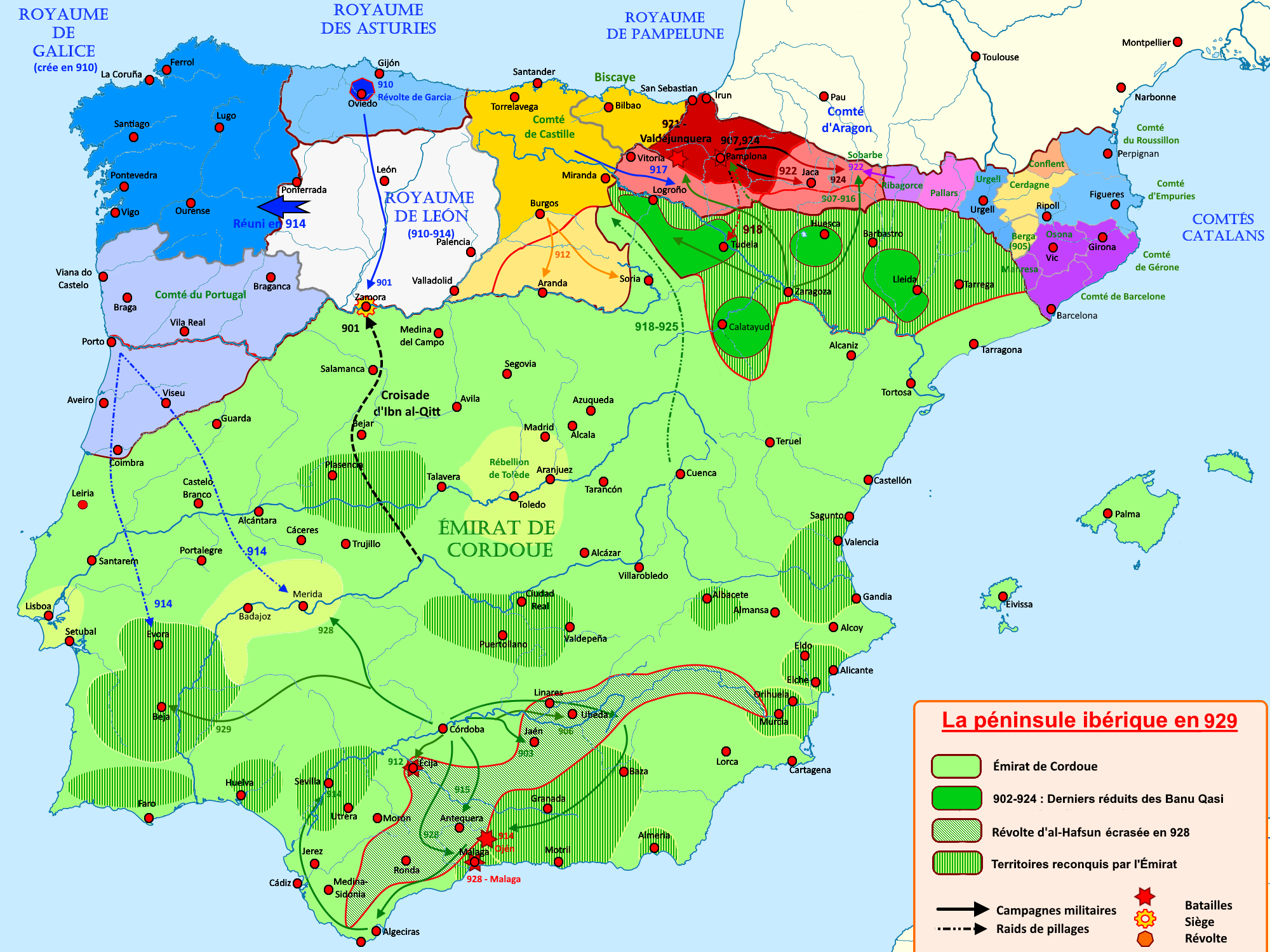
Iberian Peninsula in 929 showing the County of Portugal

Hermenegildo González or Mendo I Gonçalves (died between 943 and 950) was a Galician count in the 10th century Kingdom of León, tenente in Deza, and the ancestor of one of the most relevant Galaico-Portuguese lineages of the Early Middle Ages. He appears in medieval charters confirming as Ermegildus Gundisaluis.

== Biography ==
The son of count Gonçalo Betotes and Teresa Eriz, and maternal grandson of count Ero Fernández, Hermenegildo had several brothers and sisters, including Aragonta González, who was the wife of Ordoño II of León before being set aside, and count Pelayo González.

He begins to appear in medieval charters in 926, and apparently died relatively young, as he is no longer seen after 943, and certainly by 950 when his widow and children divide the inheritance, while his widow continues to appear through 981.

== Marriage and issue ==
He married Mumadona Dias, Countess of Portugal between 915 and 920, daughter of Count Diego Fernández and Countess Onecca (Onega) and founder of the Monastery of Guimarães. In 926, King Ramiro II of León donated to the couple the village known as Creximir near Guimarães. Two years later, Mumadona's mother, Onecca, made a donation, confirmed by several magnates, including her son-in-law Hermenegildo, to the Monastery of Lorvão in memoria domnissimi nostri nomini ueremudi diue memorie where she mentions all her children: (Note: In December 928, Onecca donated Villa Cova to the Monastery of Lorvão, mentioning her children who confirm the document as Munnia, Ledegundia, Exemenus Didaz, Mummadoma, also confirming Ermegildus Gundisaluis. Charter mentioned by Torres Sevilla-Quiñones de León.)

- Gonzalo Menéndez, count and dux magnus of Portugal, who first appears in a document of 24 July 950, the same document which confirms Hermenegildo as already dead.
- Diego Menéndez (died after 964), married to Aldonza and father of a nun at the monastery founded by her grandmother, after whom she was named, Mumadona Dias. (Note: This Mumadona is often confused with her grandmother. Historian Cardozo wrote that Mumadona, the wife of Hermenegildo González, was still alive in 992 based on a charter where her granddaughter and namesake received a donation from a friar.)
- Ramiro Menéndez (died before 964), married to Adosinda Gutiérrez, daughter of Count Gutierre Menéndez and Ilduara Ériz. This couple were probably the parents of Queen Velasquita, the first wife of King Bermudo II of León.
- Onecca Menéndez, married to Gutierre Rodríguez
- Nuño Menéndez (died ca. 959);
- Arias Menéndez

== Bibliography ==
- Cardozo, Mário (1967). "O Testamento de Mumadona, fundadora do Mosteiro e Castelo de Guimarães na segunda metade do século X" (PDF). Revista de Guimarães (in Portuguese). 77 (3–4). Sociedade Martins Sarmento: 279–298.
- García Álvarez, Manuel Rubén (1960). "¿La Reina Velasquita, nieta de Muniadomna Díaz?" (PDF). Revista de Guimarães (in Spanish). No. 70. pp. 197–230. Archived from the original (PDF) on 2013-10-06.
- Herculano, Alexandre (1868). Portugaliae Monumenta Historica: Diplomata et chartae. Vol. I, Fasc. II. Lisboa: Academia das Ciências de Lisboa. OCLC 504624362.
- Mattoso, José (1970). "A nobreza portucalense dos séculos IX a XI" (PDF). Do tempo e da história (in Portuguese). No. III. Lisbon: Instituto de alta cultura. Centro de estudos históricos. pp. 35–50. Archived from the original (PDF) on 2013-10-17.
- Salazar y Acha, Jaime de (1989). "Los descendientes del conde Ero Fernández, fundador de Monasterio de Santa María de Ferreira de Pallares". El Museo de Pontevedra (in Spanish). No. 43. pp. 67–86. ISSN 0210-7791.
- Sánchez Candeira, Alfonso (1950). "La reina Velasquita de León y su descendencia". El Museo de Pontevedra (in Spanish). No. 40. pp. 449–505. ISSN 0018-2141.
- Torres Sevilla-Quiñones de León, Margarita Cecilia (1999). Linajes nobiliarios de León y Castilla: Siglos IX-XIII (in Spanish). Salamanca: Junta de Castilla y León, Consejería de educación y cultura. ISBN 84-7846-781-5.
