= Elvira Menéndez =

Elvira Menéndez or Mendes may refer to:

- Elvira Menéndez (died 921), Queen consort as the wife of King Ordoño II of León
- Elvira Menéndez (died 1022), Queen consort as the wife of King Alfonso V of León
