= Amalvinus =

Amalvinus (French: Amauvin or Amauguin) was the Count of Bordeaux in the late 9th and early 10th century. He is only recorded on two occasions in history.

At the Council of Bourges in August 887, he appeared as count of Bordeaux along with William I of Auvergne, Odo of Toulouse, Sancho III of Gascony, and Archbishop Frotaire of Bordeaux. He was clearly one of the leading personages in Aquitaine at the time.

He was a friend of Alfonso III of Asturias, rex Hispaniae, who calls him "duke" in a letter to the canons of Saint Martin of Tours. The canons had offered the king a golden and jewelled crown and the king readily consented to buy it. His ships and envoys landed in Bordeaux in May 906 to receive the crown which the canons had entrusted to Amalvinus.
