= Urraca bint Qasi =

Urraca bint Qasi was the queen consort of Asturias as the second wife of King Fruela II between about 913 and 925. She is the earliest recorded person named Urraca.

Urraca was the daughter of Abdallah ibn Mu-hammad, the Banu Qasi governor of Tudela, who died in 915. Her family background is mentioned by both Ibn Hazm and Ibn Khaldun. She was raised a Muslim. She was married to Fruela around 913. She gave birth to two sons: Ordoño and Ramiro. Her marriage and sons are mentioned by Ibn Hazm. She also issued a charter with her sons that is cited in a later charter of 976. In 932, her sons were blinded by their cousin, Ramiro II, and sent to the monastery at Ruiforco. She and Fruela may have been the parents of Urraca, wife of Aznar Purcélliz in 969–978.

Fruela's younger brother Ramiro appears married to a woman named Urraca in 926–929. This was probably Urraca bint Qasi, his brother's widow, since the name was otherwise unknown in Asturias at the time.
