= Hermenegildo Gutiérrez =

Galician noble (c. 850 – after 912)

- Count of Porto, Mayordomo
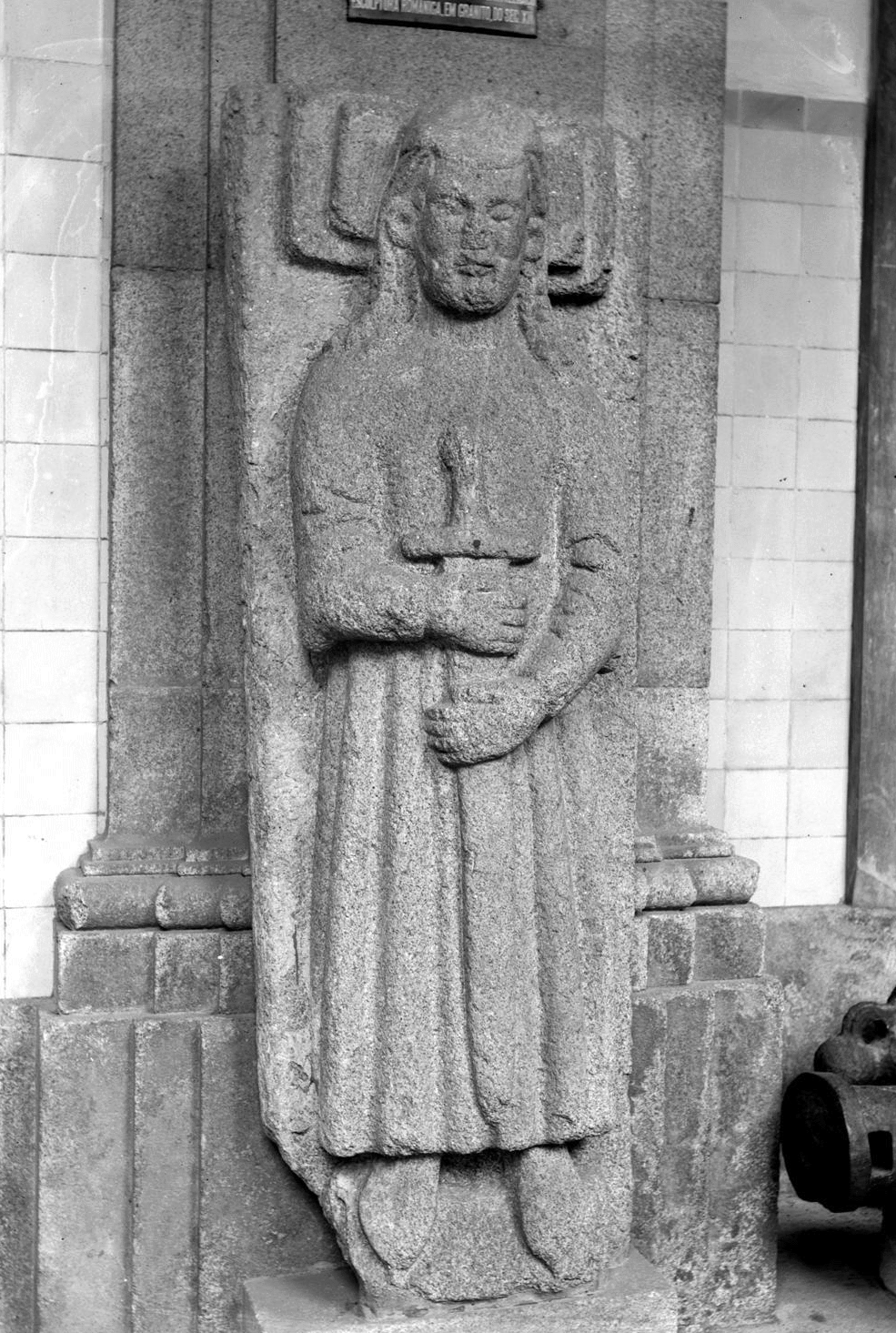
- Statue of Hermenegildo Gutiérrez in Tui, Pontevedra
- Successor: Gutier Menéndez
- Born: c. 850
- Died: after May 912
- Spouse: Ermesenda Gatónez
- Issue: Arias Menéndez Elvira Menéndez; Gutierre Menéndez; Enderquina "Palla" Menéndez; Ildonza or Aldonza Menéndez; Patruina Menéndez Gudilona Menéndez
- Father: Gutierre
- Mother: Elvira

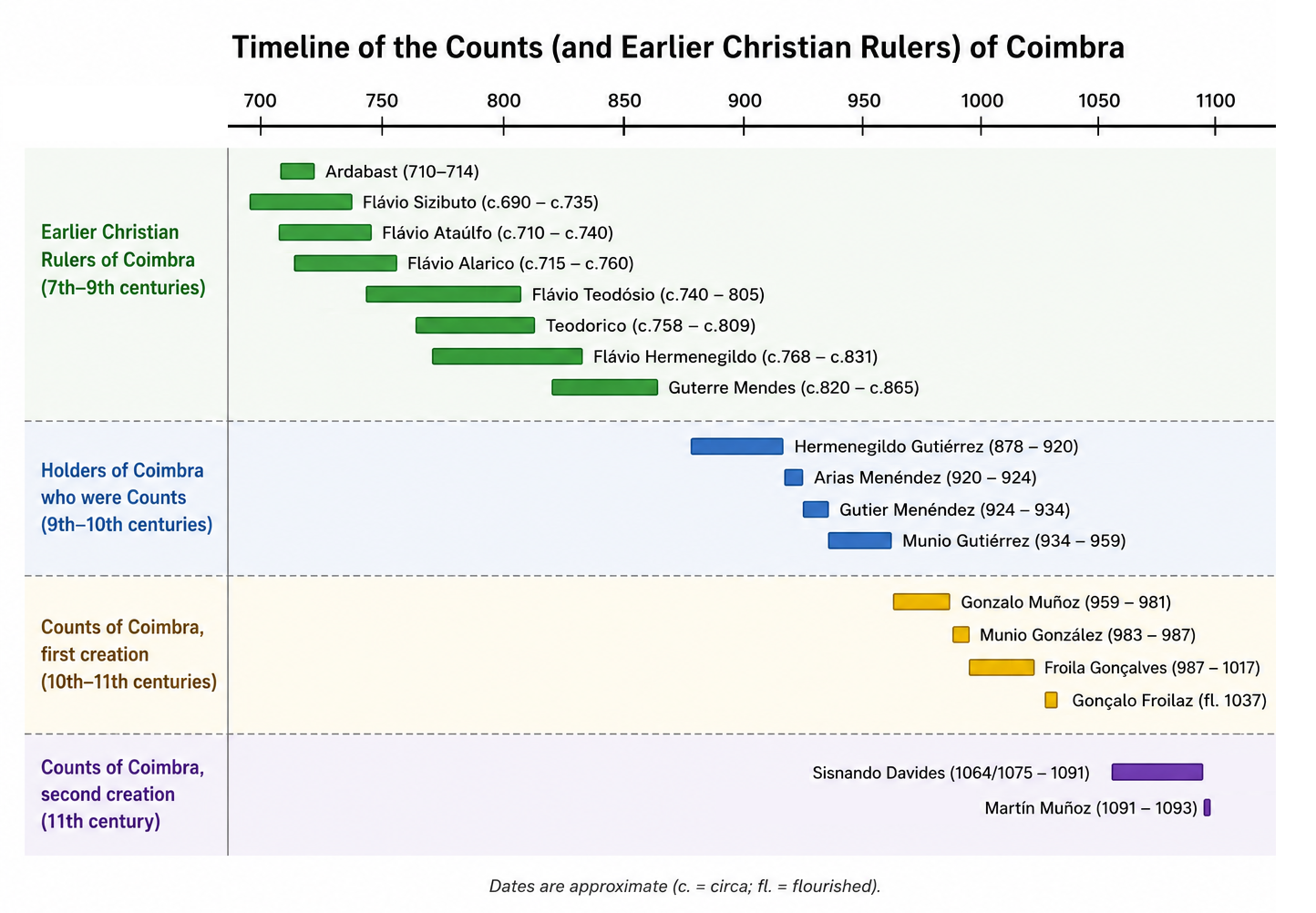
Timeline of the Counts of Coimbra

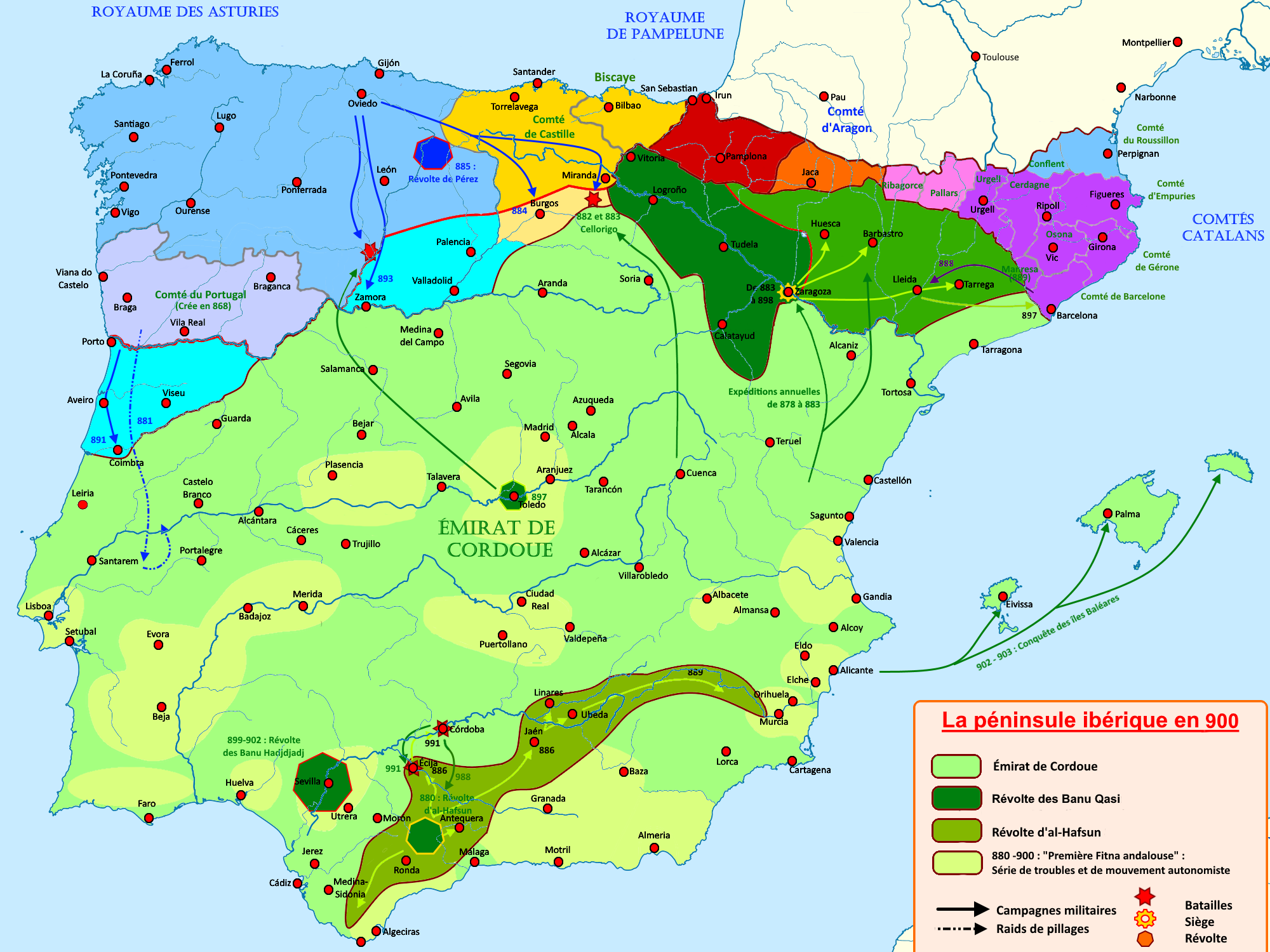
Iberian Peninsula at the time of Hermenegildo Gutiérrez

Hermenegildo Gutiérrez (Portuguese: Hermenegildo Guterres, Galician: Hermenexildo Gotérrez; c. 850 – after May 912), was a Galician noble who lived during the 9th and 10th centuries. As the Mayordomo mayor of King Alfonso III, he was an active member of the curia regia. His daughter Elvira, as the first wife of King Ordoño II, was queen consort of León.

== Biography ==
Count Hermenegildo, the son of count Gutierre and his wife Elvira, appears in medieval documentation starting in 869 — when with his father-in-law, Gatón, count in Astorga and El Bierzo, settled a dispute between the king of Asturias and bishop Mauro — until his last appearance in May 912, when he confirmed a donation made by his son-in-law, king Ordoño II, to the Cathedral of Santiago de Compostela. He was one of the most loyal vassals of King Alfonso III, who named him his mayordomo mayor and compensated his efforts and services to the crown with many properties and tenencias.

Hermenegildo played an active role in military operations during the Reconquista. In 878, he defeated the Muslim troops who had attacked Porto and then Coimbra, repopulating these cities, as well as neighboring Braga, Viseu, and Lamego, with people from Galicia after expelling the Moors. His holdings there would pass to his descendants and come to be called the County of Coimbra, which was retaken again in 987 by Almanzor and it was not until 1064 that the city was permanently reconquered by the Christian armies of Ferdinand I of León.

In 895, Hermenegildo defeated and captured the Galician noble Witiza who had taken up arms against the king of Asturias, taking him in chains before the monarch who compensated the count with many of the rebel's estates and tenencias.

Hermenegildo Gutiérrez was succeeded by his son Gutier Menéndez. In the 11th-century, his great-grandson Count Alvito Nunes, initiated a second period in which the family governed the County of Portugal after succeeding Count Menendo González, son of Count Gonzalo Menéndez.

== Ancestry ==
It was claimed that Hermenegildo was descended from Count Ardabastus, an individual supposedly descended from the Constantinian, Valentinian, and Theodosian dynasties of the Roman Empire. The line is documented in a controversial and dubious deed, and while some have suggested that the genealogy it contains could still be authentic, the lack of surviving documentation from the period spanned makes independent evaluation impossible. If true, it would be a rare example of Descent from antiquity.

== Marriage and issue ==
He married Ermesenda Gatónez, daughter of count Gatón. She was probably a first cousin of King Alfonso since Gatón is believed to have been the brother of Ordoño I, or perhaps of his wife. This marriage gave rise to one of the most prominent noble families in medieval Galicia and in the County of Portugal. The offspring of this marriage were:

- Arias Menéndez (died after 924) count, married to Ermesenda Gundesíndez, his niece. He had at least one daughter, Elvira Arias, married to her cousin Munio Gutiérrez.
- Elvira Menéndez, who married around the year 900 the future king of Galicia and León, Ordoño II of León, and was mother of his children, including Kings Ramiro II and Alfonso IV of León.
- Gutierre Menéndez, a powerful count, who married Ilduara Ériz, daughter of count Ero Fernández and countess Adosinda. This couple had several children, including Saint Rudesind.
- Enderquina "Palla" Menéndez, who married Gundesindo Eriz, son of count Ero Fernández.
- Ildonza or Aldonza Menéndez who married Gutierre Osorio, count in Lourenzá, with whom she had several children, including Queen Adosinda Gutiérrez, the first wife of King Ramiro II of León, and Count Osorio Gutiérrez, called el conde santo (the saintly count), founder of the Monastery of Lourenzá
- Patruina Menéndez
- Gudilona Menéndez, the wife of count Lucidio Vimáraz of Portucale, son of count Vimara Pérez and Trudildi. Her filiation, a hypothesis by Almeida Fernández, is not documented.

== See also ==
- Portugal in the Reconquista

== Bibliography ==
- López Sangil, José Luis (2001). "La fundación del Monasterio de San Salvador de Cines" (PDF). Anuario Brigantino (in Spanish). No. 24. Betanzos. pp. 139–156. ISSN 1133-1240. OCLC 402770925.
- López Sangil, José Luis (2002). La nobleza altomedieval gallega, la familia Froílaz-Traba (in Spanish). La Coruña: Toxosoutos, S.L. ISBN 84-95622-68-8.
- Martínez Díez, Gonzalo (2005). El Condado de Castilla (711-1038): la historia frente a la leyenda (in Spanish). Vol. I. Valladolid. ISBN 84-9718-276-6.
- Mattoso, José (1981). A nobreza medieval portuguesa, a família e o poder (PDF) (in Portuguese). Lisbon: Editorial Estampa. OCLC 8242615. (Originally published in 1968 in Studium Generale, vol. 12, pp 59–115)
- Sáez, Emilio (1946). "Notas al Episcopologio Minduniense del Siglo X". Hispania: Revista española de Historia (in Spanish) (XXII). Madrid: CSIC, Instituto Jerónimo Zurita: 3–79.
- Sáez, Emilio (1947). "Los ascendientes de San Rosendo: notas para el estudio de la monarquía astur-leonesa durante los siglos IX y X". Hispania: Revista española de Historia (in Spanish) (XXX). Madrid: CSIC, Instituto Jerónimo Zurita: 139–156. OCLC 682814356.
- Torres Sevilla-Quiñones de León, Margarita Cecilia (1999). Linajes nobiliarios de León y Castilla: Siglos IX-XIII (in Spanish). Salamanca: Junta de Castilla y León, Consejería de educación y cultura. ISBN 84-7846-781-5.
