= Rudesind =

10th century Galician bishop and abbot

Saint Rudesind
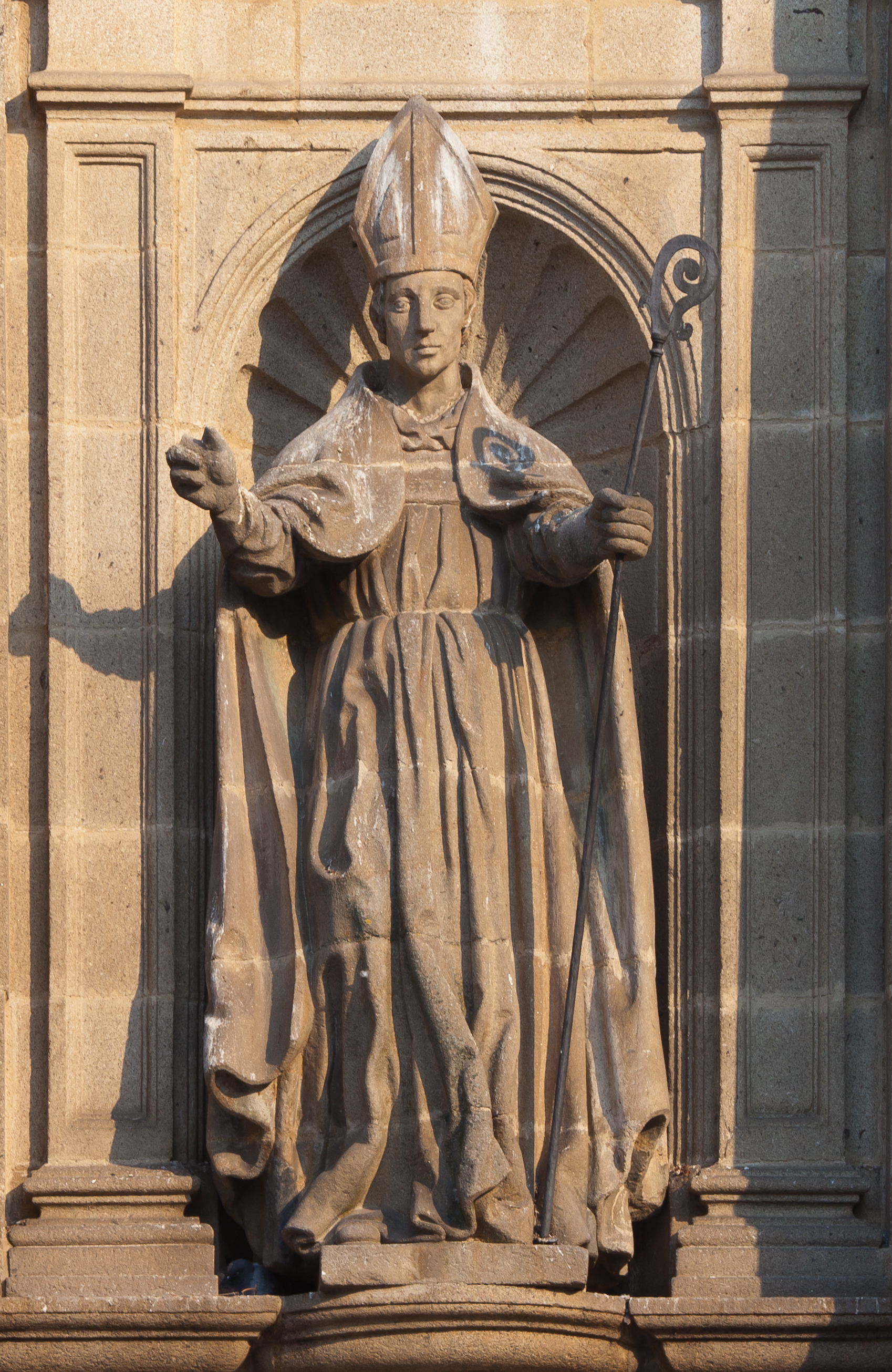
- Saint Rudesind, Saint Salvator Monastery, Celanova, Galicia (Spain)
- Born: 907; Monte Córdova, Santo Tirso, Portugal (in 907 County of Portucale) Galicia
- Died: March 1, 977; Celanova
- Venerated in: Roman Catholic Church; Eastern Orthodox Church
- Canonized: 1195 by Pope Celestine III
- Major shrine: Celanova Abbey
- Feast: March 1
- Patronage: Pinar del Río, Cuba

Saint Rudesind (Galician: San Rosendo, Rudesindo; Portuguese: São Rosendo Latin: Rudesindus) (907 – March 1, 977) was a Galician bishop and abbot. He was also a regional administrator and military leader under his kinsmen, the Kings of León.

== Life ==
Rudesind was born into the nobility: his father was Count Gutierre Menéndez (Latin: Gutiher Ermegildi), brother-in-law to Ordoño II and supporter of Alfonso III of León, and his mother was St. Ilduara Eriz (Latin: Hilduara Erici), daughter of count Ero Fernández. His sister Hermesenda became wife of Count Pelayo González and mother-in-law of count Gonzalo Menéndez. Rudesind was the grandson of Ermesenda Gatónez, sister of his predecessor in the see of Mondoñedo (Dumium), Bishop Sabarico II, and was also related to the abbess Saint Senorina.

He became a monk at a young age and became bishop of Mondoñedo at the age of 18 (as Rudesind II). He served as bishop from 925 to 950, then after a hiatus in which his nephew, Arias Núnez, filled the role, again served briefly from 955 to 958, to be followed again by Arias. Another nephew, Arias Peláez, would later hold the see.

== Founder of monasteries ==
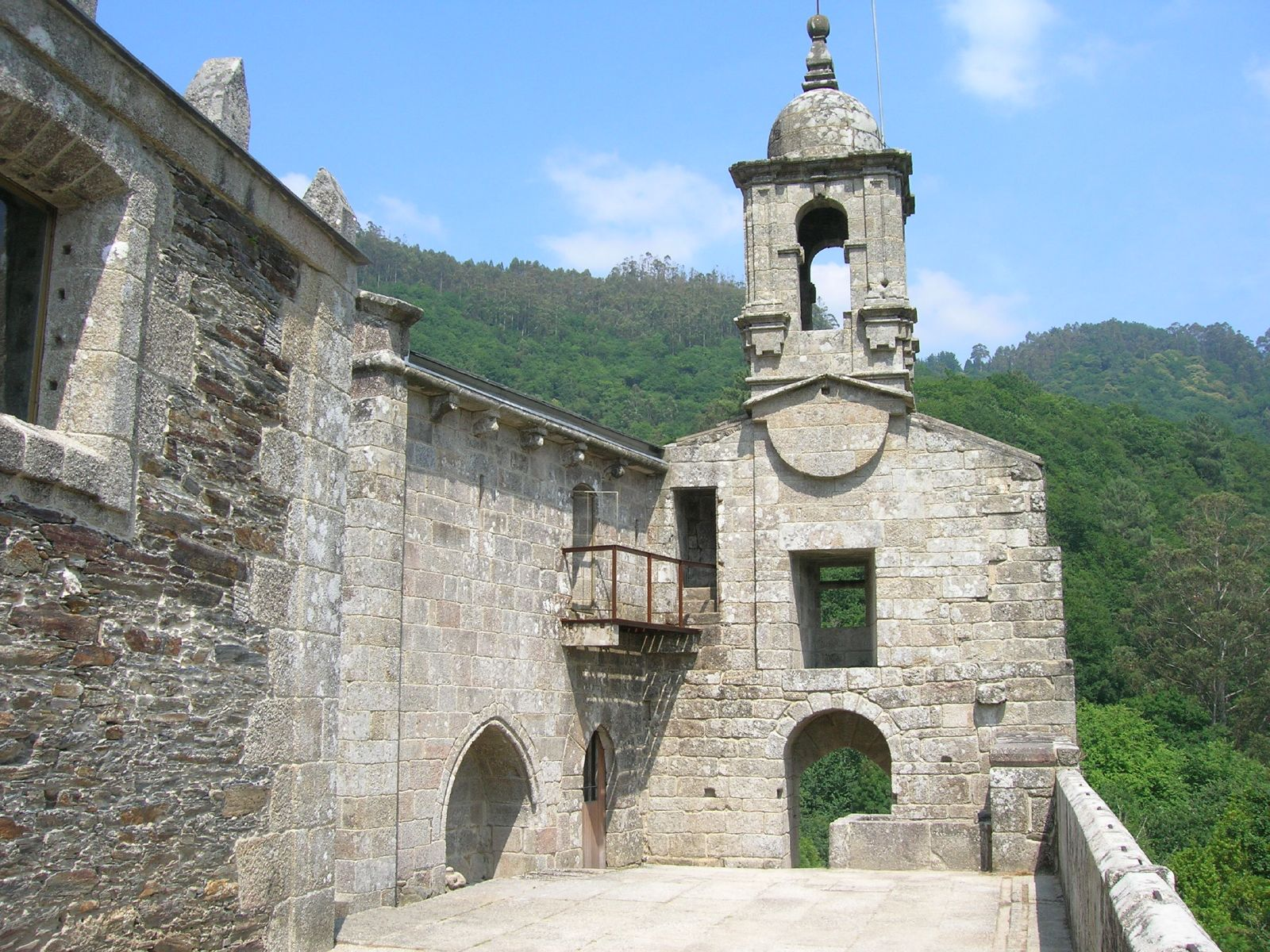
Monastery of Saint John of Caaveiro.

He founded, allegedly under the Benedictine Rule, monasteries such as Saint John of Caaveiro (San Xoán de Caaveiro) (934) and the Monastery of San Salvador de Celanova (September 12, 936).

To build Celanova, he managed to make his brother Spanish: Fruela (Latin: Froyla) and his cousin Spanish: Jimena (Latin: Scemena) give up their rights to the land of Villar, where he founded this monastery.

== Administrative and military career ==
In 955, he was named by King Ordoño III governor of the lands of Celanova. Rudesind also had jurisdiction over the lands that extended from Riocaldo (the southern boundary of Galicia) to Santa Maria de Ortigueira (on the Cantabrian coast). Later, at the request of Elvira Ramírez of León (Latin: Geloyra Renamiri), aunt of the future Ramiro III, he was made governor of Galicia, from spring of 968 to early 969.

He led forces against Norse and Moorish armies. The Moors had crossed the Mondego and had reached the Minho.

In 966, the Norsemen had raided Galicia and killed the warlord and bishop of Santiago de Compostela Sisnand in battle, but Rudesind later rallied the local forces and killed their leader Gundered.

== Second Episcopal career ==
Rudesind had already served as bishop of Mondoñedo - Dumio. After the killing of Sisnand in the battle of Fornelos, Rudesind was appointed administrator of the See of Iria Flavia, and he was in charge of that diocese from 968 to 977. After 977, he retired from his sees (he was succeeded at Compostela by Pelayo Rodríguez, a monk of Celanova).

== Career as abbot ==
Rudesind succeeded St. Franquila (originally from the monastery of Ribas de Sil) as abbot of Celanova. As abbot of Celanova, he was a leading figure of his time, and received visits from religious leaders throughout Galicia and Portugal who wanted spiritual advice. A deacon named Egila, in a donation that he made to Celanova, wrote this to Rudesind: "To you, eminent bishop, Rudesind, holiest father, true teacher, who teaches your subjects with your words and deeds...". He earned a reputation for performing miracles.

== Veneration ==
In 1601, his relics were exhumed and placed in a silver urn at the principal altar of the church of Celanova Abbey.

== Legends ==
A legend told of Rudesind concerns his birth. His mother had previous children, but they had all died in infancy. When her husband Gutierre went on an expedition to Coimbra with Alfonso III, Ilduara accompanied him. She prayed at the hermitage of San Salvador on Monte Cordova, after climbing up to it alone and barefoot. There she received the knowledge, from Saint Michael, that she would bear a son who would become not only a great leader of men but also a holy man. In gratitude, she ordered the construction of a church there and remained until Rudesind had been born. She wanted to baptize her son at San Salvador, but the cart used to haul up the baptismal font broke down. The workers went to get another cart. Meanwhile, however, Saint Michael had the broken cart move up the hill on its own accord.

Catholic Church titles
Preceded by Sabaricus II	Bishop of Dumium; 925–950	Succeeded by Arias Núnez
Preceded by Arias Núnez	Bishop of Dumium; 950–958	Succeeded by Arias Núnez
Preceded by Sisnando Menéndez (Bishop)	Administrator of Diocese of Iria Flavia; 970–977	Succeeded by Pelayo Rodríguez (Bishop)
