= Epistola Adefonsi Hispaniae regis =

The Epistola Adefonsi Hispaniae regis anno 906 (“letter of Alfonso, king of Spain in the year 906”) is a letter purportedly written by Alfonso III of Asturias to the clergy of the cathedral of Saint Martin's at Tours in 906. The letter is primarily about the king of Asturias purchasing a crown kept in the treasury of the church of Tours, but it also includes instructions for visiting the shrine of James, son of Zebedee, which lay in Alfonso's kingdom. An exchange of literature was also arranged in the letter. Alfonso requested a written account of the posthumous miracles worked by Saint Martin. In return the church of Tours would receive the Vitas sanctorum patrum Emeritensium, a hagiography of some early Bishops of Mérida.

The authenticity of the letter is widely questioned and "it has generally been regarded with scepticism by modern historical scholarship". It is rejected, for example, by Lucien Barrau-Dihigo, although it has been accepted as genuine by Hermann Hüffer, Carl Erdmann, and Richard Fletcher.

== Palaeography and diplomatic ==
The letter was copied into a cartulary of Tours compiled between 1132 and 1137, but which was destroyed in 1793. A copy was made for the 17th-century antiquary André Duchesne, and this is the copy from which all modern editions derive. Since no earlier copy survives, it is impossible to ascertain at which stage of transmission the corruptions in the present manuscript were introduced. No correspondence of the kings of Asturias, Castile or Kingdom of León has survived from before the 12th century save this letter, if authentic. For all these reasons neither the science of palaeography nor that of diplomatic can solve the problem of authenticity. If a forgery, the letter must pre-date the 1130s, when the cartulary of Tours was compiled.

In his surviving charters Alfonso almost invariably calls himself simply "King Alfonso" (Adefonsus rex), but in the letter he uses the elaborate and higher-sounding style "Alfonso by the power and nod of Christ king of Spain" (Adefonsus pro Christi nutu at que potentia Hispaniae rex). This not entirely unique, however, as a similarly grandiose title is given to Alfonso in the contemporary Chronica Prophetica (883): "glorious Alfonso in all the Spains to reign" (gloriosus Adefonsus in omni Spanie regnaturus).

== Contents ==
The letter purports to be a response to a letter the king received from the clergy of Tours asking him if he would like to purchase an "imperial crown (corona imperialis) made of gold and precious stones, fitting to his dignity" kept at their church. This letter (literas) may not have been the first of its kind from Tours, for Alfonso refers in his response to their mentioning the crown "again" (rursum). It was delivered to the king by Sisnando, the bishop of Iria Flavia, who had received it from Mansio and Datus, two envoys of Tours, who had encouraged the bishop to persuade the king to buy. In this passage Sisnando is anachronistically titled archbishop, centuries before the see of Iria Flavia was raised to that dignity in 1120, under Diego Gelmírez. If the letter was copied after 1120, the error may be a "correction", intentional or not, to reflect the later status of Iria Flavia. It has also been suggested that the title archiepiscopus is an expansion of æpiscopus (bishop), a spelling known from contemporary Spanish documents, but of which a scribe working at Tours may have been ignorant and assumed the diphthong æ represented an abbreviation of archie-. This variant spelling of episcopus is encountered in an original Asturian royal charter of 7 March 918.

Alfonso accepted the offer and promised to arrange a "journey by sea" (navalis remigatio) for May 906 (that same year) to make the exchange. The year of 906 is given in the anno Domini (AD) system of dating, rather than that of the Spanish era, then more prevalent in Spain. This is probable to be explained by the unfamiliarity of the recipients of the letter with his latter system of dating. While the anno Domini system was known in Asturias—and was used in a document recording the consecration of a new cathedral at Iria Flavia in 899—the Spanish era was hardly known outside of Spain, and even the Venerable Bede, "greatest computist of the early middle ages", was ignorant of it. It was planned to send members of the royal household to Bordeaux, where Alfonso apparently had connexions with the local magnate, Amalvinus, called "our friend" in the letter and titled both duke and count of Bordeaux. The obscure figure of Amalvinus, otherwise only known from a document of 887, lends credence to the letter. Alfonso requested that the clergy send the crown to Bordeaux by mid-May and that two or three men of Tours accompany his men back to Spain.

The reason for Alfonso's request for a work about Saint Martin's posthumous miracles—that he then only possessed an account of Martin's miracles performed while alive—can be partly verified, for Alfonso left his library to the church of San Salvador de Oviedo in 908, and the list of books drawn up at the time includes the life of Saint Martin by Sulpicius Severus, "the most famous piece of hagiography in western Christendom". The work that he offered Tours in exchange was not found widely within Spain and not at all outside it, a state of affairs suspected by Alfonso himself. Its first editor and translator, J. N. Garvin, could find no mention of this work from the Middle Ages outside of Alfonso's disputed letter.

The letter from Tours apparently informed Alfonso of the Viking attack of 903 in the course of which Saint Martin's, and large swathes of the city, were burnt. The rebuilding began immediately under Archbishop Hebemus. Alfonso in his response rejoices that the restoration of the church is going ahead, and that new miracles have been reported at the saint's shrine, which probably inspired his request for an updated vita of Saint Martin.
