= Rudesind I =

Medieval Galician clergyman

Rudesindus I (in office 877–907) was a medieval Galician clergyman.

Catholic Church titles
Preceded by Sabaricus I	Bishop of Dumium; 877–907	Succeeded by Sabaricus II
