= Elvira Menéndez (died 921) =

Queen of León from 914 to 921

Elvira Menéndez/Mendes
- Died: 921
- Spouse: Ordoño II of León
- Father: Hermenegildo Gutiérrez
- Mother: Ermesenda Gatónez

Elvira Menéndez (Portuguese and Galician: Elvira Mendes; died between 20 February and 12 October 921) was Queen consort of León due to her marriage with King Ordoño II.

== Biography ==
Elvira was the daughter of Hermenegildo Gutiérrez, a Galician noble, count in Tuy and Porto, who was responsible for the reconquest of Coimbra, and his wife Ermesenda Gatónez. Around 892, Elvira married Infante Ordoño, the son of King Alfonso III of Asturias, who first ruled as King of Galicia and later of León after the death of his brother García I in 914. Elvira confirmed numerous charters with her husband, many of these being privileges and donations to Galician nobles and religious establishments, especially to the Cathedral of Santiago de Compostela.

Elvira died between 20 February and 12 October 921. According to the chronicle of Sampiro, when King Ordoño received the news of her death upon his return from a successful campaign against the Moors in Zamora, "...the pain was as great as the joy for his triumph". She was buried in the Pantheon of Asturian Kings in the Cathedral of San Salvador in Oviedo.

== Issue ==
From her marriage to King Ordoño she had the following children:

- Sancho Ordóñez, King of Galicia;
- Alfonso IV, King of León;
- Ramiro II, King of León after the abdication of his brother Alfonso;
- García Ordóñez (died after 934);
- Jimena Ordóñez (died after 935).

== Bibliography ==
- Arco y Garay, Ricardo del (1954). Sepulcros de la Casa Real de Castilla (in Spanish). Madrid: Instituto Jerónimo Zurita. Consejo Superior de Investigaciones Científicas. OCLC 11366237.
- Sáez, Emilio (1947). "Los ascendientes de San Rosendo: notas para el estudio de la monarquía astur-leonesa durante los siglos IX y X". Hispania: Revista española de Historia (in Spanish) (XXX). Madrid: CSIC, Instituto Jerónimo Zurita: 139–156. OCLC 682814356.
