= Jimena of Asturias =

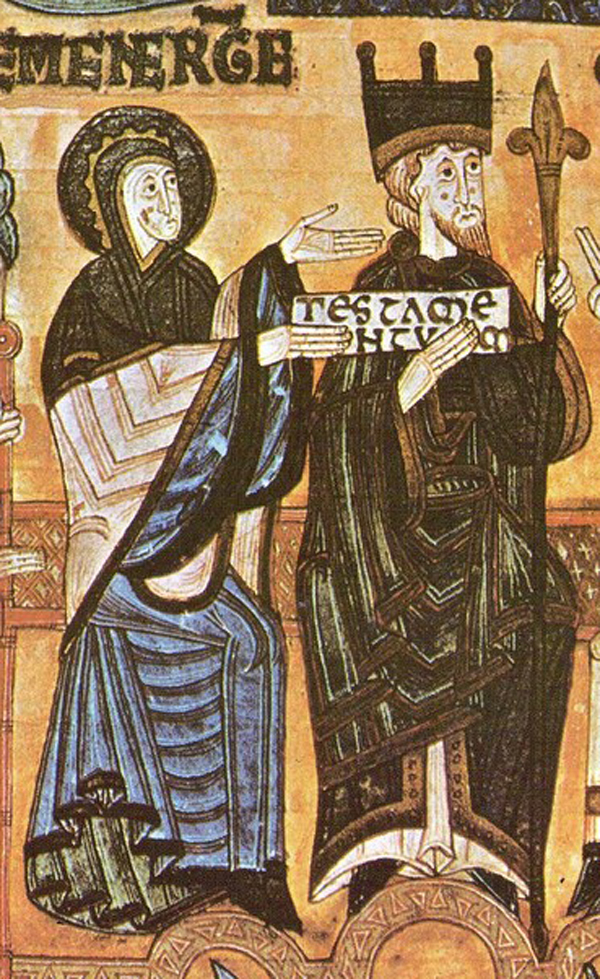

Jimena of Asturias (died 912), also known as Jimena of Pamplona, was queen consort of Asturias from 869 to 910.

She was married to Alfonso III of Asturias. She originally came from Pamplona.

Her children included García I of León, Ordoño II of León and Fruela II of Asturias.
