= García I of León =

King of León from 910 to 914

García I
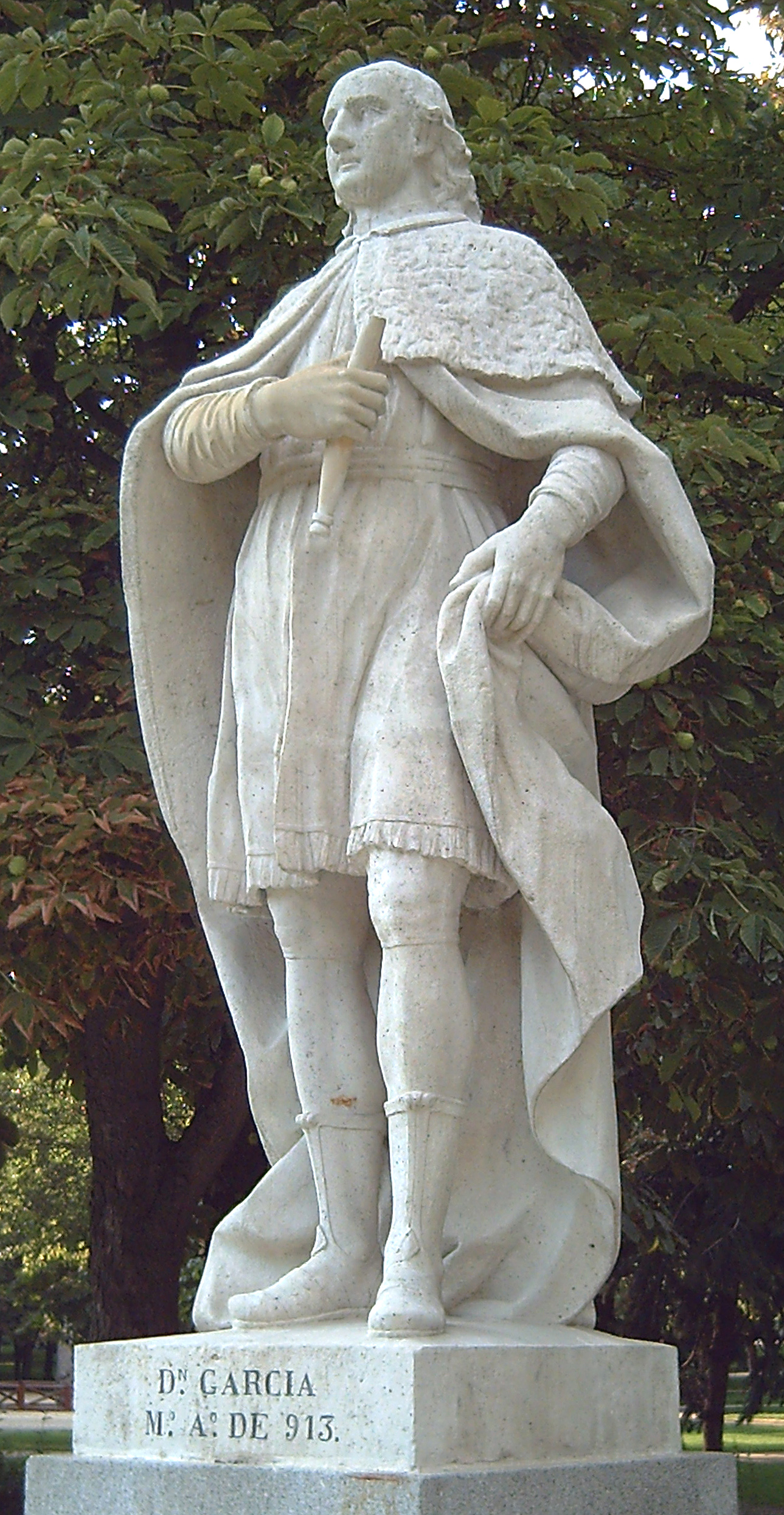
- 18th-century statue in Madrid

King of León
- Reign: 910–914
- Predecessor: Alfonso III
- Successor: Ordoño II
- Born: c. 871
- Died: c. 914
- Burial: Cathedral of San Salvador, Oviedo
- Consort: Muniadona
- Dynasty: Astur-Leonese dynasty
- Father: Alfonso III of Asturias
- Mother: Jimena of Pamplona
- Religion: Catholicism

García I (c. 871 – 914) was the King of León from 910 until his death and eldest of three succeeding sons of Alfonso III of Asturias by his wife Jimena.

García took part in the government alongside his father until 909. In that year a conspiracy, in which García was implicated, was uncovered. Alfonso renounced the throne and divided the realm among his three sons. León went to García, Galicia to Ordoño, and Asturias to Fruela. Asturian primacy was nevertheless recognised.

García's reign saw the fortification of the Duero and the repopulation of Roa, Osma, Clunia, and San Esteban de Gormaz. During this period, the count of Castile, Gonzalo Fernández gained influence through these endeavours. At his death in Zamora in 914 he had no heirs and his kingdom passed to Ordoño.

García's wife, Muniadona, was said by Pelagius of Oviedo to have been daughter of Nuño Fernández, but this is chronologically impossible. Sánchez Albornoz suggested instead that she was daughter of Munio Núñez, the repoblador of Roa and Count of Castile. She may have been the same Muniadona later married to count Ferdinand Ansúrez of Castile.

Preceded by Alfonso III	King of León; 910–914	Succeeded by Ordoño II
