= Monastery of San Salvador de Celanova =

Coordinates: 42°9′6″N 7°57′25″W

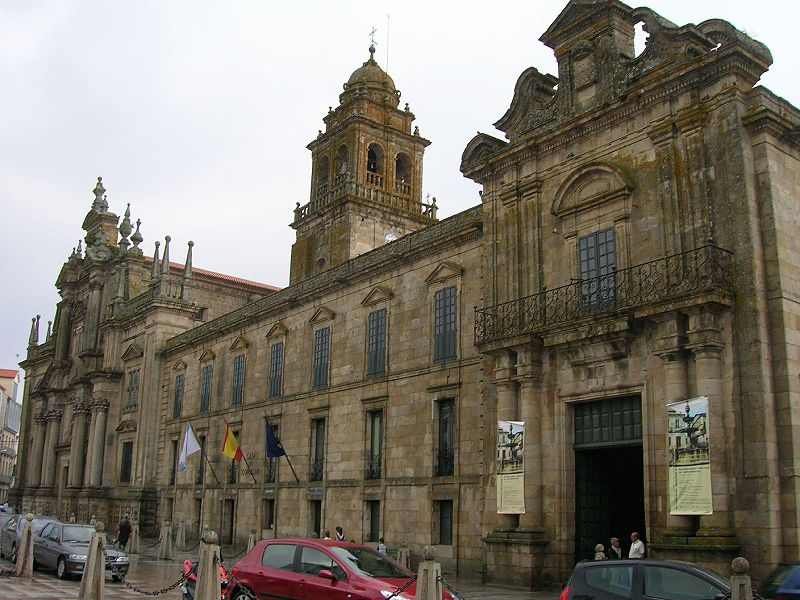
San Salvador de Celanova

The monastery of San Salvador de Celanova is a religious complex in Celanova, Galicia, Spain. The once wealthy abbey of Benedictines was founded by St. Rudesind (San Rosendo) in 936. The jewel of the complex is the small Mozarabic chapel of San Miguel, dating from 942. It is located near Allariz and 14 miles (23 km) from Ourense. In the garden is one of the oldest chapels in Spain, built before 973.

In the abbey church are the ancient sepulchres of Ilduara and Adosinda, the mother and sister of the founder, who was buried in a sepulchre supported on four pillars, and constructed after the fashion of that of San Torcuato, one of the companions of Santiago. His body was deposited by the Christians, at the Moorish invasion, at Santa Coinba, 10 miles (16 km) away. Being near the frontier, some Portuguese carried it off and brought it to Celanova, whose bells began to ring of their own accord.

There are two cloisters. El Processional has columns, a fountain and railing, while El Puleiro includes a chapter house and brick mosaic pavement. The Doric church has two separate choirs, featuring a carved door and walnut silleria. There are many memorials.

== See also ==
- Early medieval domes
