= Fruela II of Asturias =

10th-century King of Asturias, León, and Galicia

Fruela II
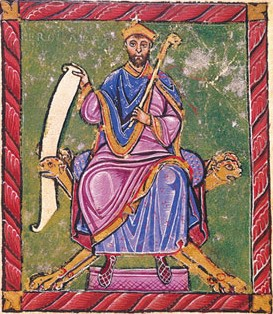
- Miniature from the Libro de los Testamentos, c. 1109–1112

King of Asturias
- Reign: 910–924
- Predecessor: Alfonso III
- Successor: Position abolished

King of León
- Reign: 924–925
- Predecessor: Ordoño II
- Successor: Alfonso IV

King of Galicia
- Reign: 924–925
- Predecessor: Ordoño II
- Successor: Alfonso Fróilaz
- Born: c. 875
- Died: July 925
- Consort: Nunilo; Urraca
- Issue: Alfonso Fróilaz; Ramiro Froilaz; Ordoño Froilaz
- Dynasty: Astur-Leonese dynasty
- Father: Alfonso III of Asturias
- Mother: Jimena of Pamplona
- Religion: Chalcedonian Christianity

Fruela II (c. 874–August 925) was the king of Asturias from 910 to 924 and king of León from 924 to 925. His father was Alfonso III of Asturias and his mother was Jimena. In 910 Fruela and two of his brothers deposed their father, Alfonso, and divided the kingdom amongst themselves. Fruela, the youngest brother, took the original portion (Asturias); Ordoño took Galicia; and García, the eldest, took León. Although Fruela called himself king of a much-diminished Asturias, evidence suggests that his role was subordinate to the king of León.

== History ==
As king of Asturias, he had the job of consolidating the region later called Castile and keeping its counts in check.

Fruela married twice, first in 910 to Nunilo Jimena, daughter of the Navarrese king. By 917 he was married to his second wife, Urraca, the daughter of the Banu Qasi governor of Tudela. From his marriages, he had at least three sons, Alfonso, Ramiro and Ordoño, none of whom would inherit the throne.

Fruela maintained good relations with his brother Ordoño, who had the hegemony. They cooperated in the Reconquista, and Fruela undersigned Ordoño's diplomas as Froila frater confirmat (Frela the brother confirms). When Ordoño died in 924, the magnates ignored his heirs and elected Fruela king. Fruela had never been popular with the nobles and his subjects, and his election has been doubted by some, who see it as a likely usurpation. He assassinated Gebuldo and Aresindo, sons of Olmundo, who claimed descent from King Witiza and thus further alienated the nobility. For this, one chronicler relates, he was condemned to a reign of only fourteen months. According to Ramón Menéndez Pidal, he exiled the bishop Frunimio of León, a relation of Olmundo. Whatever the case, he reigned for only fourteen months and died of leprosy in August 925. Following Fruela's death, there were several competing claimants to his lands, including his younger brother Ramiro (who appears to have married the widowed queen Urraca bint Qasi and used the royal title but was eventually unsuccessful) and the sons of his brother Ordoño II, along with his own young sons. There is some debate about the immediate succession, although eventually, his family lost out to brother Ordoño.

According to Bishop Pelayo, he left three sons by Nunila: Alfonso, Ordoño, and Ramiro. Ibn Khaldun gives Ordoño and Ramiro to Urraca and leaves open the possibility of other children by either wife.

Fruela II of Asturias Astur-Leonese dynasty Born: c. 875 Died: July 925
Regnal titles
Preceded by Alfonso III	King of Asturias; 910–925	Succeeded by Alfonso IV
Preceded by Ordoño II	King of León; 924–925	Succeeded by Alfonso IV
Preceded by Ordoño II	King of Galicia; 924–925	Succeeded by Alfonso Fróilaz
