= Ordoño II of León =

King of León from 914 to 924

Ordoño II
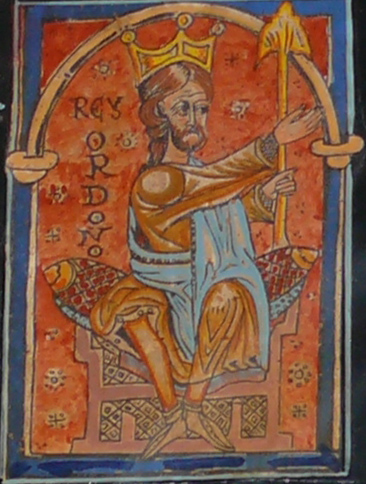
- Ordoño II in the 12th-century Libro de las Estampas

King of Galicia
- Reign: 910–924
- Predecessor: Alfonso III
- Successor: Fruela II

King of León
- Reign: 914–924
- Predecessor: García I
- Successor: Fruela II
- Born: c. 873
- Died: June 924 (aged 50–51); León
- Burial: León Cathedral
- Consort: Elvira Menéndez; Aragonta González; Sancha Sánchez of Pamplona
- Issue: Sancho I Ordóñez; Alfonso IV; Ramiro II; Garcia; Jimena
- Dynasty: Astur-Leonese dynasty
- Father: Alfonso III of Asturias
- Mother: Jimena of Pamplona
- Religion: Chalcedonian Christianity

Ordoño II (c. 873 – June 924, León) was a king of Galicia from 910, and king of Galicia and León from 914 until his death. He was an energetic ruler who submitted the kingdom of Leon to his control and fought successfully against the Muslims, who still dominated most of the Iberian Peninsula. His reign marked the tactical and smooth transition of the regnum Asturum to the regnum Legionis, with the royal headquarters already established in the city of León.

== Family ==
Born around 873, he was the second son of King Alfonso III of Asturias, and his wife, Jimena.

Upon Alfonso's death in 910, the kingdom was divided among his three sons: León went to García, Galicia to Ordoño, and Asturias to Fruela. Asturian primacy was nevertheless recognised, though Ordoño was of a harder temperament than his brothers. Upon García's death in Zamora in 914, Ordoño succeeded him to the throne of the León.

== Life ==
=== Youth ===
His father sent him to Zaragoza to be educated in the court of the Banu Qasi. During his father's lifetime he served the government of Galicia. He personally directed, before the year 910, a military expedition against the Muslims in the south of the Iberian Peninsula, which reached the city of Seville. The expedition destroyed and looted the neighborhood of Regel, "considered one of the strongest and most opulent," as it is referred to by Historia silense, but this neighborhood has not been identified with certainty by historians.

For unknown reasons, the children of Alfonso III the Great rebelled against their father in 909. Although the infant Garcia, brother of Ordoño, was arrested and imprisoned in Gauzón castle, the following year Alfonso III was obliged to abdicate by his children and divide his kingdom amongst them. The kingdom of León devolved to the firstborn son, Garcia, while the kingdom of Asturias went to Fruela and Galicia to Ordoño. Alfonso III died in the city of Zamora on December 20, 910.

Garcia I kept distant and combative relations with his brother Ordoño. When Alfonso III died, Garcia prevented the bishop Gennadius of Astorga from taking five hundred metcales, donated by Alfonso III to the shrine of the Apostle, to the city of Santiago de Compostela with him.

=== Accession to the throne of León ===
At the death of his brother Garcia, which occurred in the city of Zamora in 914, Ordoño II inherited the kingdom of León since, even though his brother had married, he died childless.

== Reign ==
Ordoño continued thereafter the expansion of the Christian polity of his forefathers on two fronts. In his south-western territories, he sacked Mérida and Évora and forced the Muslim governor of the region to buy his retreat.

In his eastern territories, he united with Sancho I Garcés, king of Navarre, against the emir of Córdoba, Abd-ar-Rahman III. The Moors were put to rout at San Esteban de Gormaz (917). Arnedo and Calahorra were taken the next year from the Banu Qasi. The reaction of Abd-ar-rahman, however, was severe. In 920, he sent an army to recover Osma and San Esteban de Gormaz. He crossed into Navarre and defeated the Christians at Valdejunquera and took the bishops of Tui and Salamanca captive. Though intending to crush Pamplona itself, he turned around to deal with his immense booty.

Ordoño II—who had come at King Sancho's request—attributed the loss to the absence of the leading counts of Castile—Nuño Fernández, Fernando Ansúrez and Abolmóndar Albo—who had not come at his call. He brought them together at Tebular on the river Carrión and had them imprisoned. The Christian counteroffensive was immediate, occupying La Rioja and incorporating into Navarre Nájera and Viguera.

He suffered frequent raids into his territory from the armies of Abd-ar-Rahman III and he confronted the Castilians who were planning a revolt in León.

== Marriages ==
Ordoño married three times. His first wife, and the mother of his children, was Elvira Menéndez, daughter of count Hermenegildo Gutiérrez and aunt of San Rosendo.

He then married Aragonta González, daughter of count Gonzalo Betótez. He set her aside because "she was not pleasing to him". When he formed a political alliance with Sancho I of Pamplona, he was married to that king's daughter, Sancha. He died in 924 leaving young children, and was succeeded by his eldest surviving brother, Fruela, the king of Asturias, thereby reuniting their father's patrimony. His widow would remarry Álvaro Herraméliz, Count of Álava, and following his death in 931, became the wife of Fernán González of Castile.

Ordoño II of León Astur-Leonese dynasty Born: c. 873 Died: January 924
Regnal titles
Preceded by Alfonso III	King of Galicia; 910–924	Succeeded by Fruela II
Preceded by García I	King of León; 914–924	Succeeded by Fruela II
