= Gonzalo Sánchez of Aragon =

Navarrese ruler in Aragon

Gonzalo Sánchez (died 997?) was a younger son of King Sancho II of Pamplona and Queen Urraca Fernández. His elder brother was King García II and he had another brother, Ramiro, and a sister who would marry Almanzor. In 996–97, he was ruling the county of Aragon alongside his mother.

In 994, Gonzalo was sent by his father as an envoy to the court of his brother-in-law Almanzor. Only two documents from the years 996 and 997 make mention of Gonzalo's rule in Aragon. Both were issued by King García II and include a clause specifying that at that time "my mother Queen Urraca and my brother Gonzalo [were] ruling in Aragon." Gonzalo was also present and confirmed the above charters. Nothing else about the rule (or reign) of Gonzalo and Urraca is known, but the historian Gonzalo Martínez Díez supposed him to have been a regulus (sub-king) ruling Aragon under the ultimate authority of his brother in Pamplona and with the assistance of his experienced mother. This situation would match that which obtained between 947 and 958 when Sancho II ruled Aragon as king under his father, García I, with the help of his guardian, Count Fortún Jiménez.

Gonzalo is not recorded after 997, and was certainly dead by the start of the reign of his nephew, Sancho III, in 1004.

== Sources ==
- Cañada Juste, Alberto (2017). "'Abd al-Rahman ibn Muhammad, Sanchuelo, hijo de Almanzor y nieto de los reyes de Pamplona" (PDF). Príncipe de Viana (in Spanish) (Año 78, N. 269): 745–777. ISSN 0032-8472.
- Martínez Díez, Gonzalo (2007). Sancho III el Mayor: Rey de Pamplona, Rex Ibericus. Madrid: Marcial Pons Historia.
- Ubieto Arteta, Antonio (1989). Historia de Aragón, VI: Orígenes de Aragón. Zaragoza: Anubar. ISBN 9788470132377.
