= Fortún Jiménez (count) =

Fortún Jiménez (fl. 943–58) was the count of Aragon at least between 947 and 958. At that time, Aragon was under the authority of the king of Pamplona, then García Sánchez I, and Fortún appears to have been exercising authority on behalf of the king's heir, the future Sancho II. In a document from 947, Fortún is described as the guardian or tutor of the young Sancho, who was the heir to Aragon through his mother Queen Andregoto Galíndez.

No primary source records Fortún Jiménez's family relations. The historian Antonio Ubieto Arteta presents three hypotheses concerning his relationships. First, he proposes that he was the son of King Jimeno Garcés, who reigned in Pamplona between 925 and 931 before García Sánchez I came of age. This would make him a first cousin of his sovereign, García Sánchez. Second, he suggests that he married Belasquita, a younger daughter of Count Galindo Aznárez II of Aragon, and was the grandfather of Andregoto (fl. 1075), mother of the prominent Aragonese count Sancho Sánchez. It is known that Andregoto was the great-niece of Belasquita's sister, Andregoto Galíndez, who inherited Aragon from their father and then married García Sánchez. Fortún may have acquired some claim to Aragon and the comital title through such a marriage. Finally, Ubieto hypothesizes that Fortún was the father of the García Fortuñones who built the castle of Atarés in 961.

Fortún is first mentioned in a document dated to 943 in the cartulary of the monastery of San Juan de la Peña. Another document from that monastery, dated 947, records how King García Sánchez I and his mother, Queen Toda Aznárez, divided a certain pardina (field) near Javierre between the crown and the monastery. The king then ordered Count Fortún and his men to go to Javierre to effect the division. A clause appended to the end of the document reads, "I, Fortún Jiménez, and my charge, the lord king Sancho, by order of the king completed [the division]." The dating clause specifies that the charter was drawn up while "Fortún Jiménez and his charge, the lord king Sancho, [were] reigning, holding Aragon." The lord king Sancho who was in Fortún's charge was King García's eldest son, the future Sancho II, who was the heir to Aragon through his mother, Andregoto Galíndez.

In 958, Fortún was called upon to preside over a suit brought by Atón, bishop of Aragon, against the men in possession of a certain allodial property called Gausa, perhaps the village of Guasa. The bishop claimed that the allod had belonged to the bishopric for over a hundred years, but that after the death of Bishop Fortún the men who worked the land stopped paying rent to the bishop. In a public assembly of the barons, judges and abbots of the land, the count issued a compromise (cominenza), according to the law, and divided the land between the bishop and the renters. The case was subsequently re-litigated before King García, who found against the renters because they could not produce witnesses.

Writing in 1571, Esteban de Garibay recognized Fortún as the last count of Aragon before the kings of Pamplona took direct control.

== Sources ==
- Collins, Roger (1986). "Visigothic Law and Regional Custom in Disputes in Early Medieval Spain". In Wendy Davies; Paul Fouracre (eds.). The Settlement of Disputes in Early Medieval Europe. Cambridge University Press. pp. 85–104.
- Martínez Díez, Gonzalo (2007). Sancho III el Mayor: Rey de Pamplona, Rex Ibericus. Madrid: Marcial Pons Historia.
- Ubieto Arteta, Antonio (1989). Historia de Aragón, VI: Orígenes de Aragón. Zaragoza: Anubar.
