= García Sánchez II of Pamplona =

King of Pamplona from 994 to c.1000

García Sánchez II
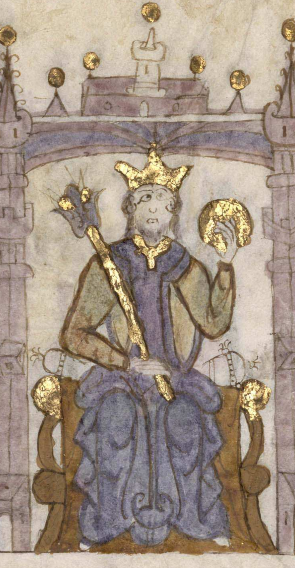
- 14th-century depiction in the Compendio de crónicas de reyes

King of Pamplona Count of Aragon King of the Kingdom of Najera
- Reign: 994 – c. 1000
- Predecessor: Sancho II
- Successor: Sancho III
- Died: c. 1000
- Consort: Jimena Fernández
- Issue: Sancho III, King of Navarre; Elvira; García; Urraca, Queen of León
- House: House of Jiménez
- Father: Sancho II of Pamplona
- Mother: Urraca Fernández

García Sánchez II (Basque: Gartzea II.a Santxez; died c. 1000), was King of Pamplona and Count of Aragon from 994 until his death c. 1000. He was the eldest son of Sancho II of Pamplona and Urraca Fernández and the second Pamplonese monarch to also hold the title of count of Aragon. Modern historians refer to him as the Tremulous, though this appellation likely originally applied to his grandfather, García Sánchez I of Pamplona.

== Biography ==
Throughout his reign, his foreign policy seems to have been closely linked to that of Castile. His mother was an aunt of count Sancho García of Castile, and also of the powerful count of Saldaña, García Gómez of Carrión, and she appears to have played a role in forming a bridge between the kingdom and county.

He joined his cousin Sancho in attempting to break from the submission his father had offered to Córdoba, as a result of which he had to face Almanzor. In 996 he was forced to seek peace in Córdoba. In 997 during an expedition into the land of Calatayud, García killed the governor's brother. Almanzor took revenge by beheading 50 Christians. At the Battle of Cervera in July 1000, he joined, along with count García Gómez of Saldaña, in a coalition headed by count Sancho García of Castile that was defeated by Almanzor (that count Sancho led the group is thought to reflect García's decline). Tradition names him one of the Christian leaders at the 1002 Battle of Calatañazor, which resulted in the death of Almanzor and the consequent crisis in the Caliphate of Córdoba, but there is no contemporary record of him after 1000, while his cousin Sancho Ramírez of Viguera may have been ruling in Pamplona in 1002. García was certainly dead by 1004, when his son Sancho Garcés III first appears as king.

Domestically, he granted the rule in Aragon to his brother Gonzalo, under the tutelage of his mother Urraca. A tradition reports that he freed all of the Muslim captives being held in the kingdom.

== Marriage and children ==
García Sánchez II was married to Jimena Fernández, daughter of Fernando Bermúdez, Count of Cea and a distinguished member of the highest ranks of the nobility of the Kingdom of León. They had the following children:

- Sancho Garcés III, King of Navarre and Count of Aragon from 1004 until his death in 1035.
- Elvira Garcés, nun in the Monastery of Leyre.
- García Garcés
- Urraca Garcés, Queen consort of León by her marriage to Alfonso V of León from 1023 until her death in 1031.

== Ancestry ==
Ancestors of García Sánchez II of Pamplona

8. Sancho I, King of Pamplona
4. García I, King of Pamplona
9. Toda of Pamplona
2. Sancho II, King of Pamplona
10. Galindo II, Count of Aragon
5. Andregoto Galíndez, Countess of Aragon
11. Sancha Garcés of Pamplona
1. García Sánchez II of Pamplona
12. Gonzalo Fernández, Count of Castile
6. Fernán González, Count of Castile
13. Muniadona
3. Urraca Fernández
Sancho I, King of Pamplona
7. Sancha Sánchez of Pamplona
Toda of Pamplona

== Sources ==
- Collins, Roger (2012). Caliphs and Kings: Spain, 796–1031. London: Wiley Blackwell.
- Cañada Juste, Alberto (1988). "Un posible interregno en la monarquía pamplonesa (1000–1004)". Príncipe de Viana. Anejo. 8: 15–18. ISSN 1137-7054.
- Cañada Juste, Alberto (2012). "¿Quién fue Sancho Abarca?" (PDF). Príncipe de Viana (in Spanish) (Año 73, N. 255): 79–132. ISSN 0032-8472.
- Martínez Díez, Gonzalo (2007). Sancho III el Mayor Rey de Pamplona, Rex Ibericus (in Spanish). Madrid: Marcial Pons Historia. ISBN 978-84-96467-47-7.
- Pérez de Urbel, Justo (1964). "Los primeros siglos de la Reconquista (años 711–1038)". In Ramón Menéndez Pidal (ed.). España Christiana: Comienzo de la Reconquista (711–1038). Historia de España. Vol. 6. Madrid: Espasa-Calpe.
- Salas Merino, Vicente (2008). La Genealogía de Los Reyes de España [The Genealogy of the Kings of Spain] (in Spanish) (4th ed.). Madrid: Editorial Visión Libros. pp. 216–218. ISBN 978-84-9821-767-4.

García Sánchez II of Pamplona House of Jiménez Born: c. 964 Died: c. 1000–1004
Preceded by Sancho II	King of Pamplona; 994–1004	Succeeded by Sancho III
