= Sancho II of Pamplona =

King of Pamplona from 970 to 994

Sancho II
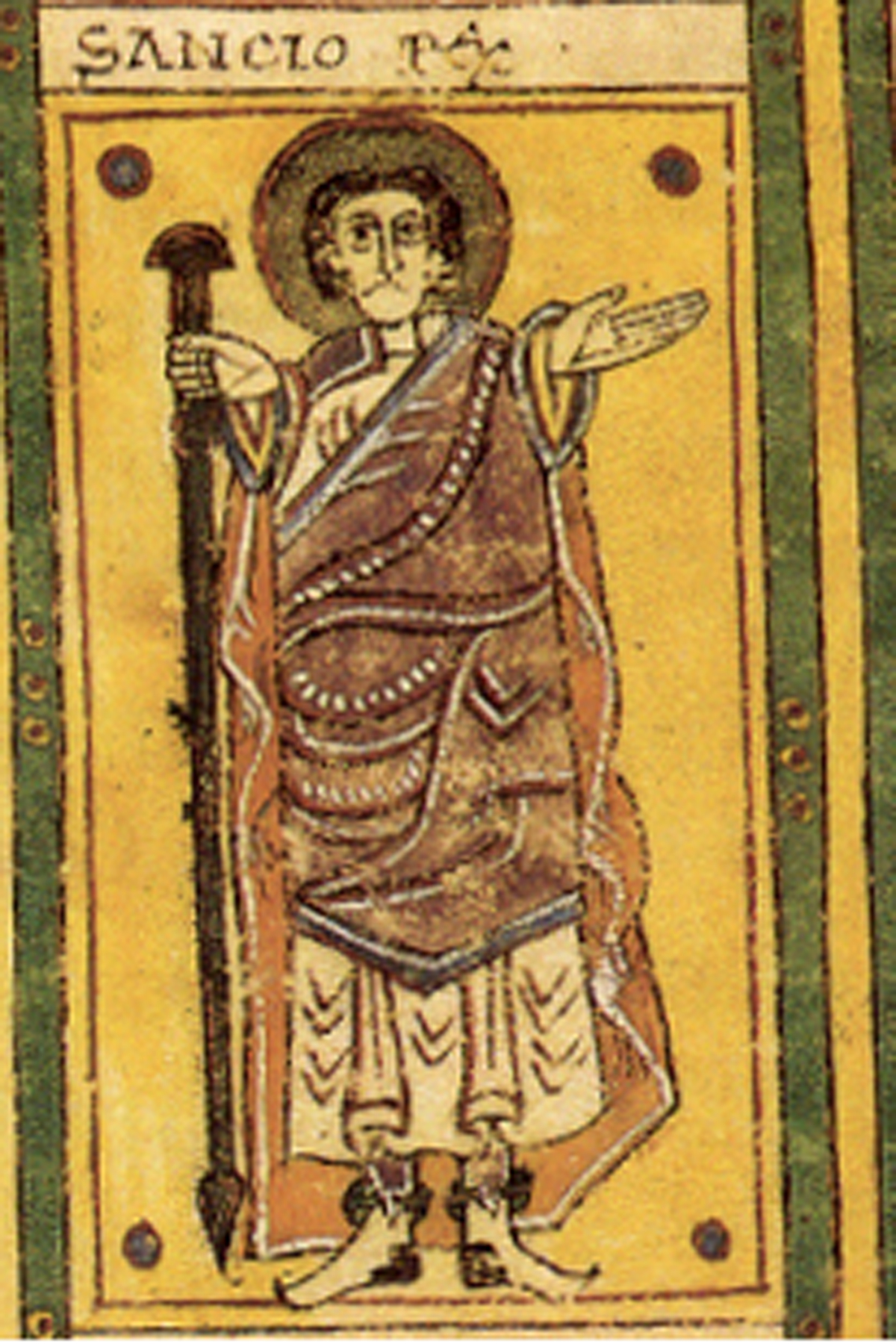
- Sancho II of Pamplona, in the Codex Vigilanus

King of Pamplona King of the Kingdom of Najera
- Reign: 970–994
- Predecessor: García I
- Successor: García II

Count of Aragon
- Reign: 948–994
- Predecessor: Andregoto Galíndez
- Successor: García II
- Born: Before 935
- Died: 994
- Burial: San Juan de la Peña
- Consort: Urraca Fernández
- Issue: García Sánchez II; Ramiro; Gonzalo; Urraca or Sancha (Abda)
- House: House of Jiménez
- Father: García Sánchez I
- Mother: Andregoto Galíndez

Sancho Garcés II (Basque: Antso II.a Gartzez, c. 938 – 994), also known as Sancho II, was King of Pamplona and Count of Aragon from 970 until his death in 994. He was the eldest son of García Sánchez I of Pamplona and Andregoto Galíndez. He recognised the Kingdom of Viguera during his reign.

== Nickname ==
He is sometimes referred to as Sancho Abarca by modern sources. This appellation was first applied to Sancho II by chroniclers writing centuries after his time who were confused about the succession to Pamplona, creating a single ruler out of the combined careers of Sancho II and his grandfather Sancho I of Pamplona. The weight of evidence suggests that this nickname originally applied to Sancho I.

== Biography ==
Sancho Garcés was born circa 938, son of García Sánchez I of Pamplona, the second King of Pamplona from the Jiménez dynasty, and his first wife Andregoto Galíndez, daughter of Galindo Aznárez II, Count of Aragon. His maternal grandfather died without any legitimate male children, thus passing down the rights to the Count of Aragon to Sancho's mother who, in turn, passed them down to him and he became Count of Aragon, in 948, while still underage. He was initially under the guardianship of Count Fortún Jiménez. After the death of his father in 970, he became King of Pamplona and was known as Sancho II.

He appears mentioned on the occasion of a donation to the monastery of San Juan de la Peña in 987, when he titled himself "king of Navarre", being the first to use said title. This title, however, did not come into common usage until the late eleventh century.

Under Sancho, the kingdom solidified some of the gains of his predecessor, but also suffered several significant military setbacks at the hands of Umayyad troops. Navarre was linked with the Kingdom of León and the County of Castile by familial bonds, and the realms frequently worked in concert, with the Navarrese monarchy supporting the young Ramiro III of León.

In 972, he founded the monastery of San Andrés de Cirueña. In 976, at the monastery of Albelda, the cultural and intellectual centre of his kingdom, the Codex Vigilanus was completed. It is one of the most important illuminated manuscripts of medieval Spain, containing the canons of the Councils of Toledo, a copy of the Liber Iudiciorum, and the first Western representation of the Arabic numerals, among many other texts.

Upon the death of the Caliph of Cordoba, Al-Hakam II, in 976, and the succession of his son Hisham II, who had been taught by Al-Mansur Ibn Abi Aamir, the prospects of the Christian kingdoms seemed dim. The troops of Al-Mansur defeated the Christians at Torrevicente, south of Soria. Afterwards, the Muslims returned to triumph at Taracueña, near Osma. In 975, Sancho was defeated by the Moors at San Esteban de Gormaz and it has been suggested that he was captured at the Battle of Estercuel that year. (Note: Antonio Ubieto Arteta argues that his younger brother Jimeno, who appears as a hostage at the court of al-Hakim II in Córdoba later in 975, may have been exchanged for Sancho's freedom.)

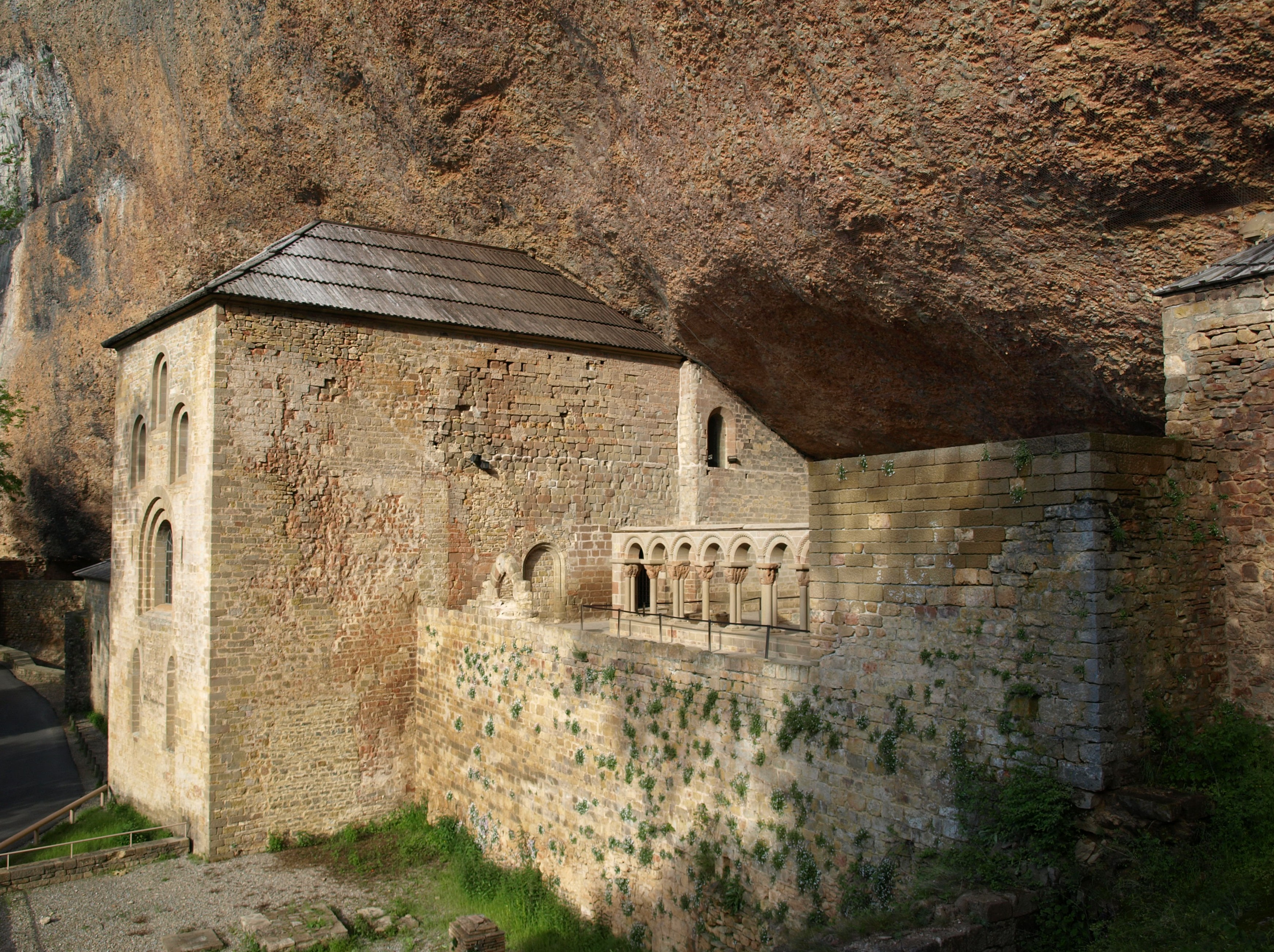
San Juan de la Peña, King Sancho's final resting place.

In 981 at the Battle of Rueda, a dozen kilometers from Tordesillas, the Christians suffered another humiliating defeat. Because he could not defeat Al-Mansur by arms, Sancho went to Córdoba as an ambassador for his own kingdom, bringing many gifts for the victorious Al-Mansur, making a pact with him and agreeing to give the Muslim his daughter. From this union was born Abd al-Rahman Sanchuelo, the second successor of Al-Mansur who tried to usurp the Caliphate of Córdoba from the Umayyad heir. He faced further incursions from Almanzor in 989, 991 and 992, the last of which resulted in a second submission at Córdoba, and the next year he sent his son Gonzalo on an embassy to the Caliphate to consolidate the rapprochement. In 994, the year of his death, the kingdom saw yet another incursion by a caliphate army.

After his death in 994, he was buried in San Estebán de Monjardín and later, he was interred in the Monastery of San Juan de la Peña.

== Marriage and children ==
Sancho Garcés was married to Urraca Fernández, daughter of the Count of Castile Fernán González. They had four children.

- García Sánchez, King of Pamplona and Count of Aragon from 994 until his death in 1000, and married to Jimena Fernández, daughter of Fernando Bermúdez de Cea, a member of very high rank among the Leonese nobility.
- Ramiro Sánchez, died in 992, when his parents made a donation to San Millán de la Cogolla for the sake of his soul.
- Gonzalo Sánchez, he was given some lands in Aragon by his brother.
- Urraca or Sancha Sanchez, known in Arabic as Abda and nicknamed "the Basque", having been given by her father to Almanzor, whom she married after converting to Islam. Abda and Almanzor had a single son, named Abd al-Rahman Sanchuelo.

== Ancestry ==
Ancestors of Sancho II of Pamplona

8. García Jiménez of Pamplona (= #14)
4. Sancho I, King of Pamplona
9. Dadildis de Pallars
2. García I, King of Pamplona
10. Aznar Sánchez of Larraun
5. Toda Aznárez
11. Onneca Fortúnez
1. Sancho Garcés II of Pamplona
12. Aznar Galíndez II
6. Galindo II, Count of Aragon
13. Onneca Garcés of Pamplona
3. Andregoto Galíndez, Countess of Aragon
14. García Jiménez of Pamplona (= #8)
7. Sancha Garcés of Pamplona
15. Onneca 'rebel of Sanguesa'

== Bibliography ==
- Arco y Garay, Ricardo del (1954). Sepulcros de la Casa Real de Castilla (in Spanish). Madrid: Instituto Jerónimo Zurita. Consejo Superior de Investigaciones Científicas. OCLC 11366237.
- Cañada Juste, Alberto (2012). "¿Quién fue Sancho Abarca?" (PDF). Príncipe de Viana (in Spanish) (Año 73, N. 255): 79–132. ISSN 0032-8472.
- Cañada Juste, Alberto (2017). "'Abd al-Rahman ibn Muhammad, Sanchuelo, hijo de Almanzor y nieto de los reyes de Pamplona" (PDF). Príncipe de Viana (in Spanish) (Año 78, N. 269): 745–777. ISSN 0032-8472.
- Martínez Díez, Gonzalo (2005). El Condado de Castilla (711-1038): la historia frente a la leyenda (in Spanish). 2 volumes. Valladolid. ISBN 84-9718-275-8.
- Martínez Díez, Gonzalo (2007). Sancho III el Mayor Rey de Pamplona, Rex Ibericus (in Spanish). Madrid: Marcial Pons Historia. ISBN 978-84-96467-47-7.
- Reuter, Timothy; McKitterick, Rosamond, eds. (1999). The New Cambridge Medieval History: Volume 3, C.900-c.1024. Cambridge University Press.
- Salas Merino, Vicente (2008). La Genealogía de Los Reyes de España [The Genealogy of the Kings of Spain] (in Spanish) (4th ed.). Madrid: Editorial Visión Libros. ISBN 978-84-9821-767-4.
- Ubieto Arteta, Antonio (1950). "Monarcas navarros olvidados: Los reyes de Viguera". Hispania: Revista española de história (in Spanish) (38). Madrid: CSIC: 3–324. ISSN 0018-2141.

Sancho II of Pamplona House of Jiménez Born: after 935 Died: December 994
Preceded by García Sánchez I	King of Pamplona; 970–994	Succeeded by García Sánchez II
