= Battle of Rueda =

Battle of Spanish Reconquista

- Part of the Reconquista
Date	981
Location	Rueda, Valladolid or Roa, Burgos, Spain
Result	Córdoban victory

Belligerents
Kingdom of León; Kingdom of Pamplona; County of Castile	Caliphate of Córdoba

Commanders and leaders
Ramiro III of León; Sancho II of Pamplona; García Fernández of Castile	Almanzor

The Battle of Rueda (981) took place during the Spanish Reconquista between the Muslim forces of Al-Andalus and a coalition of north-Iberian Christian states. Due to the difficulty in interpreting the various chronicles, historians are still debating the site of the battle. According to Reinhart Dozy, the battle was fought in Rueda in Valladolid, whereas Ruiz Asencio considers that it was Roa, in Burgos, a fortress that had been repopulated in 912.

The Muslim forces were commanded by Almanzor, while the Christian troops were a combined force and the combined from the kingdoms of León and Pamplona, plus the County of Castile, led by King Ramiro III of León, Sancho II of Pamplona, and García Fernández of Castile. The battle ended in a disastrous defeat for the Christian kingdoms and resulted in the rebellion of the Galician nobles and the eventual abdication of King Ramiro III in favor of Bermudo II of León.

The battle followed a similar defeat at the Battle of Torrevicente.

== Sources ==
- Martínez Díez, Gonzalo (2005). El Condado de Castilla (711-1038): la historia frente a la leyenda (in Spanish). 2 volumes. Valladolid. ISBN 84-9718-275-8.
