= Battle of Torrevicente =

Battle of the Reconquista (981)

Coordinates: 41.3333°N 2.93333°W

- Part of the Reconquista Iberian Peninsula
Date	9 July 981
Location	Torrevicente
Result	Córdoban victory

Belligerents
Emirate of Córdoba	Muslim rebel force County of Castile; Kingdom of Viguera

Commanders and leaders
Ibn Abi ‘Amir	Galib ibn Abd al-Rahman (executed); García Fernández; Ramiro Garcés

The Battle of Torrevicente was fought on Saturday, 9 July 981 between a force loyal to the Caliphate of Córdoba under the command of Ibn Abi ‘Amir and a rebel force under Galib ibn Abd al-Rahman and his Christian allies, King Ramiro Garcés of Viguera and Count García Fernández of Castile. It was Galib's intention to continue the policy of previous caliphs, Abd ar-Rahman III and al-Hakam II, which was to maintain supremacy over the Christian principalities in peace. Ibn Abi ‘Amir was pursuing a new policy of jihad, signalled by his seven aggressive actions against the Christians in the previous three years. Both Ramiro and Galib died during the battle and Ibn Abi ‘Amir was victorious. It was the twelfth of Ibn Abi ‘Amir's military campaigns, and was called in Muslim sources the "Campaign of the Victory" (Campaña de la Victoria).

The principal sources for the battle—all Arabic—are Ibn al-Khatib (A‘mal al-a‘lam), Ibn Hazm (Naqt al-‘arus), and al-Udri (Tarsi‘ al-ajbar), while Ibn Idari (Boyan), al-Maqqari (Nafh al-tib), and Ibn Alabar (in the biography of Asma, daughter of Galib and wife of Ibn Abi ‘Amir, in his Tekmila) give brief notices. Ibn Hazm relied for his account on his father, Ahmad ibn Hazm, a vizier who took part in the battle on the side of Ibn Abi ‘Amir, while Ibn al-Khatib appears to have relied on Ibn Hazm. No Christian or Latin source mentions the battle, but the Anales castellanos segundos states that "the Moors took Atienza" (prendiderunt mauri Atenza) in the year 1018 of the Spanish era (era mile XVIII), which correspondsd to 980. Atienza was conquered, not from the Christians, but from Galib's partisans as a result of their defeat at Torrevicente. The year, however, was 981.

Ibn Abi ‘Amir left Córdoba on 4 Dhu al-Qi'dah 370 in the Islamic calendar (11 May 981 in the Julian). On Thursday, 2 Muharram 371 (7 July 981), (Note: The Islamic year 371 is sometimes said to have begun on 7 July (1 Muharram) and thus the battle to have taken place on 10 July, but this is based on an erroneous calculation of the Islamic lunar years, and 10 July 981 was a Sunday. The year 371 began on 6 July 981.) according to Ibn al-Khatib, the armies of Galib and Ibn Abi ‘Amir arrived before the castle of Sant Biyant, that is, San Vicente (probably Torrevicente, near Atienza, as identified by Évariste Lévi-Provençal), as agreed upon beforehand through diplomatic channels. Friday passed without battle, perhaps out of respect for the Muslim holy day, but on Saturday combat began. According to the eye-witness account of Ibn Hazm's father, Ibn Abi ‘Amir was commanding the centre of his army, while the right, composed of Berbers, was under the command of Abu Ya‘far ibn ‘Ali al-Zabi and his brother Yahya, and the left was under the joint command of Ahmad ibn Hazm, Abu-l-Ahwas Ma‘n ibn ‘Abd al-‘Aziz al-Tuyibi, and al-Hasan ibn ‘Abd al-Wadud al-Salami.

The octogenarian Galib, riding a horse and wearing a tall helmet, himself led the initial charge against the Berbers, who immediately broke ranks and fled. The left wing likewise broke under a charge and, in Ahmad ibn Hazm's words, each man looked out for only himself. Having dispersed both of Ibn Abi ‘Amir's flanks, Galib reportedly prayed that God would aid whoever was better suited to lead the Muslims. Then, spurring his horse, he descended into a nearby ravine. His comrades, presuming he was relieving himself, did not follow, but when he was gone a long time they went in search of him and found him dead on the ground, his horse calm nearby. The cause of death was unknown. Believing Galib's death was a sign from God, a large group of his followers went to seek peace from Ibn Abi ‘Amir, who, thinking it was a ploy, demanded proof of Galib's death. One brought his seal, another his hand, and another his horse. It was then that the Muslims inflicted a severe defeat on Galib's Christian allies. Galib's remaining Muslim troops panicked and fled in the direction of Atienza, pursued the whole way by the Ibn Abi ‘Amir's forces. García managed to escape, but Ramiro was found among the dead, along with many other Christians. Muslim historians interpreted the battle as a victory over the Christians.

Ibn Abi ‘Amir followed his victory by taking Atienza and Calatayud (Qalat Ayub), the centres of Galib's support, and directing a razzia into Castile. After seventy-eight days of campaigning, he returned to Córdoba in triumph on 27 July, taking the caliphal honorific al-Manṣūr bi-llāh (meaning "victorious through God"). It is by the medieval Latinisation of al-Manṣūr that Ibn Abi ‘Amir is best known today: Almanzor. In Córdoba, Galib's skin was stuffed with cotton and crucified in the gate of the alcázar. His head, also nailed to a cross, was placed in the gateway of al-Zahira, where it remained until the destruction of that place.

== Identity of Ramiro ==
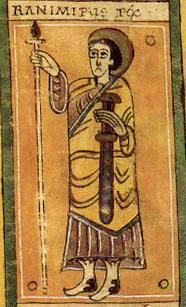
Contemporary miniature of Ramiro of Viguera (Ranimirus rex, "king Ramiro", according to the superscription), bearing the sword and holding a sceptre, from the Codex Vigilanus

Both the identity and the death of Ramiro at Torrevicente has been a matter of some controversy. Ibn al-Khatib and Ibn Hazm refer to him as "Rudmir ibn San", that is, Ramiro Sánchez. A younger son of Sancho II of Navarre did have the name Ramiro, but he appears indisputably in documents between 983 and 991 in the cartularies of San Salvador de Leyre, San Martín de Albelda, and San Juan de la Peña. He probably died in 992. The well-known difficulties of Arab historiographers in tracking the various Sanchos and Garcías of the Navarrese royal family have led some scholars to conclude that Sánchez is an error for Garcés. Ramiro Garcés was Sancho of Navarre's brother and he is not known from any documents dating later than 981. Further, he was a king, unlike Ramiro Sánchez. Antonio Ubieto Arteta and José María Lacarra, however, date Ramiro Garcés's death rather to 991. A document of 15 August 981 records the donation of Sancho II of Pamplona and Urraca Fernández to Abbot Eximino of the monastery of Leyre, where Ramiro was already buried, the property in the village of Apardués that he had possessed in life, his palaces and belongings both movable and immovable. Another donation of the same year, possibly the same day, records the obligations of the village of Apardués to the monastery. Though the list of confirmants seems to demonstrate the document's authenticity, the three confirming bishops—Sisebutus, Atus, and Vincentus—were not all in power in 981, but correspond perfectly with a date of 991, in which year, on 15 February, Sancho and Urraca made a similar donation of Ramiro's former possessions in Navardún to the monastery of Leyre. (Note: All three documents are dated by the Spanish Era in Roman numerals, making 981 M.^{a}XVIII.^{a} and 991 M.^{a}XX.^{a}VIII.^{a}.) Possibly, the donations of 981 were re-confirmed in the presence of the bishops during the ceremony of 991.

== Sources ==
- Cañada Juste, Alberto (1982). "Un milenario navarro: Ramiro Garcés, rey de Viguera". Príncipe de Viana. 42: 21–37.
- Martínez Díez, Gonzalo (2005). El condado de Castilla, 711–1038: La historia frente a la leyenda. Barcelona: Marcial Pons Historia. pp. 495–500.
- Ruiz Asencio, J. M. (1968). "Campañas de Almanzor contra el reino de León (981–986)". Anuario de Estudios Medievales. 5: 31–64.
- Ubieto Arteta, Antonio (1950). "Monarcas navarros olvidados: los reyes de Viguera". Hispania. 10 (38): 3–24.
