= Guntislo Galíndez =

Guntislo Galíndez (fl. c. 923), also spelled Guntisclo, Gutísculo, Gutisclo or Gutislo, was an illegitimate son of Galindo Aznárez II, the last independent count of Aragon. The name of his mother, one of Galindo's servants, is not known. Galindo died without surviving legitimate sons, and his counties were divided between his legitimate daughters: Sobrarbe went to Toda Galíndez and her husband, Count Bernard I of Ribagorza, while Aragon passed to Andregoto Galíndez and her husband, King García Sánchez I of Pamplona. The name Guntislo is of Gothic origin, and is in keeping with the naming practices of the Galíndez counts of Aragon, who favoured names of Gothic and Basque origin.

Guntislo is known from only two sources: the genealogies found in the late 10th-century Codex of Roda from the Kingdom of Pamplona and a single document from the cartulary of the monastery of San Juan de la Peña. According to the Roda genealogy, "From other servants [Galindo Aznárez II] had [several illegitimate children, among them] lord Guntislo ... Lord Guntislo took as his wife lady Oria, sister of Jimeno Galíndez de Veral and lady Comitisa and daughter of lord Quintila, and they had [children unnamed]." Guntilso's father-in-law, Quintila, is known from two documents issued on 22 November 947. The genealogy is not entirely consistent, in that the patronymic of Oria's brother, Jimeno Galíndez, indicates that his (and by implication her) father's name was Galindo and not Quintila.

In the document from San Juan de la Peña, dated to 948, King García Sánchez of Pamplona and his mother, Toda Aznárez, confirm a sentence passed by two judges, Galindo Aznárez and Jimeno Galíndez, over a pardina (field) above Javierre (Scaberri). The document specifies that, at some point prior, the pardina was confirmed as an allod of San Juan de la Peña by two counts named Guntislo and Galindo. In 948, the king divided the pardina between himself and the monastery. The second judge, Jimeno Galíndez, may be identical with the Jimeno Galíndez de Veral who was Guntislo's brother-in-law. The historian Antonio Ubieto Arteta believes that the count Guntislo mentioned in 948 is probably the same as the son of Galindo Aznárez. José María Lacarra, on the other hand, doubts that the two mentions refer to the same person.

If the two sources are referring to the same person, this suggests that Guntislo was count of Aragon for a time, probably after his father's death and before the county passed to García Sánchez of Pamplona. His father was still living in 922, and Christian Settipani suggests that Guntislo was count from about 923 until 933.

== Sources ==
- García Moreno, Luis A. (1997). "Una hipótesis germanista en los orígenes de Aragón" (PDF). Anuario de Historia del Derecho Español. 67 (Jan): 633–41.
- Lacarra, José María (1945). "Textos navarros del Códice de Roda" (PDF). Estudios de Edad Media de la Corona de Aragón. 1: 194–283. Archived from the original (PDF) on 2016-03-03.
- Settipani, Christian (2004). La noblesse du Midi carolingien: Études sur quelques grandes familles d'Aquitaine et du Languedoc du IX^{e} au XI^{e} siècles. Oxford: Prosopographica et Genealogica.
- Ubieto Arteta, Antonio (1989). Historia de Aragón, VI: Orígenes de Aragón. Zaragoza: Anubar.
