= County of Aragon =

Frankish marcher county (802–1035)

Northeastern Spain in 1035. Information extracted from the Atlas of Navarre Geography and History edited by the Department of Education of the Government of Navarre and EGN Comunicación

The County of Aragon (Aragonese: Condato d'Aragón) or County of Jaca (Aragonese: Condato de Chaca) was a small Frankish marcher county in the central Pyrenean valley of the Aragon river, comprising Ansó, Echo, and Canfranc and centered on the small town of Jaca (Iacca in Latin and Chaca in Aragonese), an area now part of Spain. It was created by the Carolingians late in the 8th or early in the 9th century, but soon fell into the orbit of the Kingdom of Navarre, into which it was absorbed in 922. It would later form the core of the 11th century Kingdom of Aragon.

== Carolingian rule ==
Originally intended to protect the central Pyrenean passes from the Moors in the same way that the Duchy of Vasconia and the Marca Hispanica were to protect the west and east, Aragon remained largely out of the reach of its nominal Carolingian lords, though it was an expressly Frankish creation and not an ethnically distinct region. The earliest attested local ruler was Oriol (807), probably Frankish, Visigothic or Hispano-Roman. That Aragon was a combined creation of Frankish efforts at Reconquest and the activity of the local Hispano-Visigothic elite to unite the rural populace against the Moors of the Ebro valley seems assured.

In the first half of the 9th century, under the strong Carolingians, such as Charlemagne, the county of Aragon was culturally oriented northwards, across the important passes at Echo and Canfranc. The monastery of San Pedro de Siresa, founded about that time, was a Benedictine house nourished by the reforms of Benedict of Aniane. The cultural endowment of the monastery was extensive; by 848 its collection of manuscripts included Vergil, Horace, Juvenal, Porphyry, Aldhelm, and Augustine of Hippo's De Civitate Dei.

== Navarrese rule ==
In the later 9th century, the Carolingians ceased to be powerful sovereigns in the outlying regions of their empire and the Moors of the Ebro valley simultaneously ceased being a threat to the Christian population to their north. As Carolingian influence waned, the counts of Aragón sought new allies. In 820 Charlemagne's vassal, Count Aznar I, was ejected from the county by his son-in-law García 'the Bad', who rode to power on the back of troops supplied by Íñigo Arista, ruler of the fledgling Kingdom of Pamplona. He then repudiated his wife in order to marry Íñigo's daughter. In 844, Aznar's son Galindo was forced to make himself a vassal of Íñigo in order to secure his return and succession to the county. Count Aznar II looked south, marrying his daughter to the wali of Huesca, Muhammad al-Tawil.

The Navarrese also expanded their kingdom to the region south of the Aragón, a zone devastated militarily by the Arabs in the preceding centuries of conflict. The Navarrese fortification of this area severely curtailed the possibility of Aragonese expansion via reconquest by cutting off the obvious route of such conquest. The death of Galindo Aznárez II without surviving legitimate sons resulted in a division of his lands, with Sobrarbe passing with a daughter to the counts of Ribagorza, while Aragon itself fell under the direct control of the Pamplona crown, king García Sánchez I marrying Andregota Galíndez, another daughter of the defunct count.

During the century of direct Navarrese lordship, the diminutive county of Aragon retained a separate administration and its charters referred to it as the "land of the Aragonese lords", and counts were appointed by the kings, starting with the illegitimate son of the last autonomous count. In the 10th century the religious centre of the county moved south to San Juan de la Peña. San Juan, contrary to San Pedro, had been founded by Christian refugees from Moorish Zaragoza and the monastery had a militant Visigothic character; the war with the Muslims was espoused and the Visigothic rite was the standard of worship.

In 922, the Aragonese had finally secured their own bishopric. The old itinerant "bishops of Aragon" (sometimes called bishops of Huesca or Jaca) were established in the valley of Borau. The bishops regularly took up residence in one of the major monasteries, like San Juan, San Pedro, or San Adrián de Sasave. The location of the see also serves as evidence that the upper valleys in the south of the country were becoming increasingly more populated as the region south of the river Aragón became more fortified and the Moorish threat diminished further. This frontier zone, too, was seeing repopulation in light of militarisation.

== Conversion into kingdom ==
Sancho the Great, who had united most of Christian Iberia under his control, gave lands in Aragon to his illegitimate son, Ramiro as early as 1015. With the deaths of his father in 1035 and brother, Gonzalo of Sobrarbe and Ribagorza, whose lands he also acquired, in 1043, Ramiro held the nucleus of what would become the Kingdom of Aragon.

== List of counts ==
- ???–809: Aureolus (attested 807-809 but probably ruling before 802)
- 809–820: Aznar Galíndez I, deposed in 820 by Pamplona
- 820–833: García the Bad, installed as vassal by Pamplona
- 833–844: Galindo Garcés, son of García the Bad
- 844–867: Galindo Aznárez I, son of Aznar Galíndez I, family restored on accepting suzerainty of Pamplona
- 867–893: Aznar Galíndez II, son of Galindo Aznárez I
- 893–922: Galindo Aznárez II, son of Aznar Galíndez II

From the death of Galindo Aznárez II, the county of Aragon was incorporated within the crown of Navarre (for kings of Navarre during this period see: List of Navarrese monarchs). The rulers of Navarre appointed a series of nobles as their (non-sovereign) counts in Aragon. These are poorly documented, but include:

- Guntislo Galíndez (fl. c. 923), illegitimate son of Galindo Aznárez II
- Fortún Jiménez, count from 947 to 958
- Gonzalo Sánchez, son of king Sancho II Garcés of Navarre (970–994), count of Aragon under tutelage of his mother Urraca Fernández

== Sources ==
- Arco y Garay, Ricardo del. "España Christiana: Hasta el año 1035, fecha de la Muerte de Sancho Garcés III" in España Christiana: Comienzo de la Reconquista (711-1038). Historia de España [dirigida por Don Ramón Menéndez Pidal], vol. 6. Espasa-Calpe: Madrid, 1964.
- Bisson, Thomas N. The Medieval Crown of Aragon: A Short History. Oxford: Clarendon Press, 1986. ISBN 0-19-821987-3. For the county, see pp. 10–11.
