= Jimena Fernández =

Queen of Pamplona as consort of García Sánchez II

Jimena Fernández (c. 970–1045) was queen of Pamplona (Navarre) as the wife of García Sánchez II of Pamplona.

She acted as regent for her son Sancho III in c. 1004–1010, in co-regency with her mother-in-law Urraca Fernández and the bishops of Navarre.
