= Sancho Sánchez =

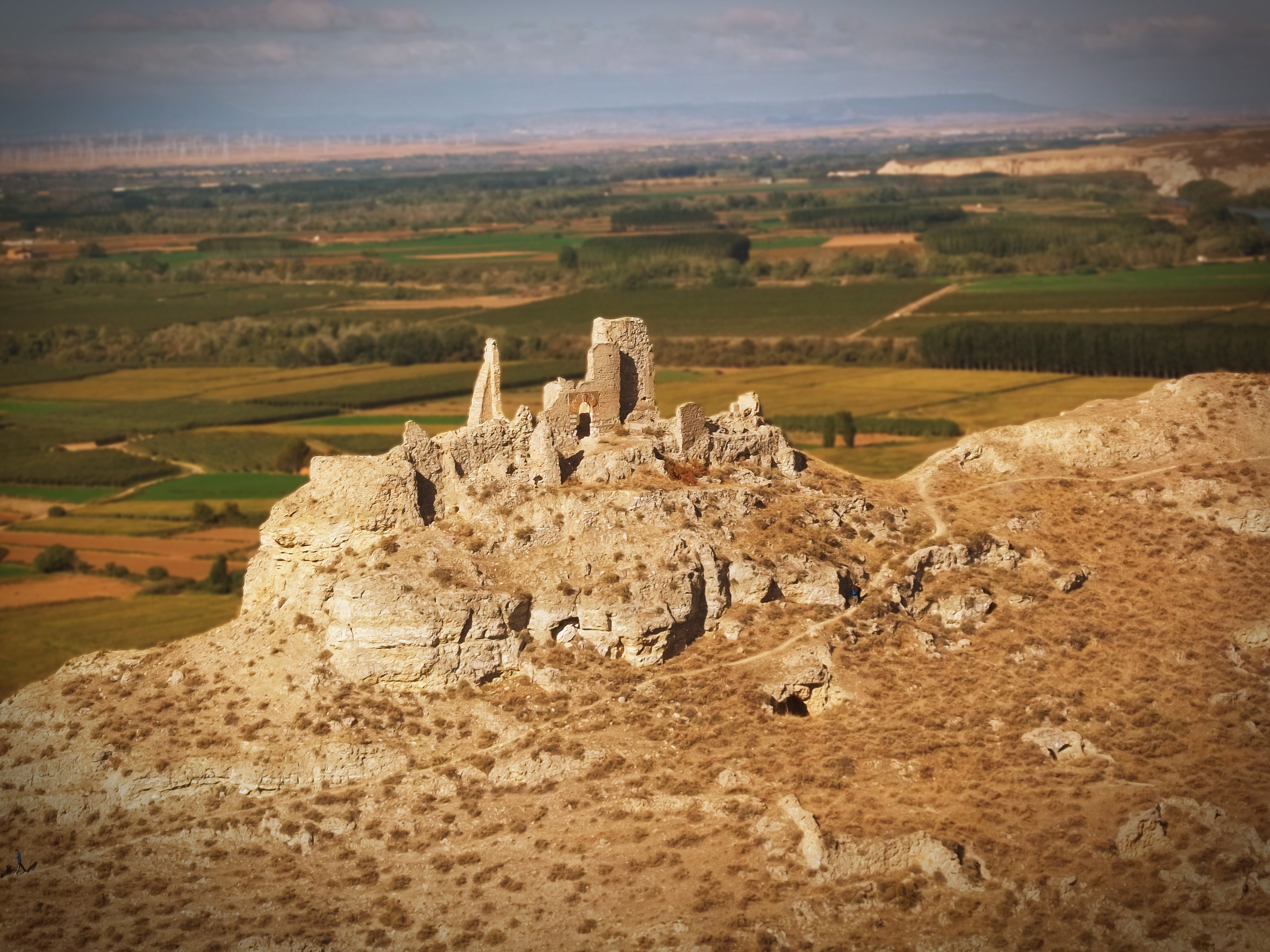
Ruins of El Castellar "over Zaragoza"

Sancho Sánchez (fl. 1075–1127) was an important magnate of the Kingdom of Aragon in the late 11th and early 12th centuries, during the reigns of Sancho Ramírez, Peter I and Alfonso I. He was governor of the important Navarrese tenancies of Erro (from 1080), the castle of San Esteban de Deyo (1084), the capital city of Pamplona (1092), Aibar and Tafalla (1098) and Falces and Leguín (1112). In Aragon proper, he governed the important fortress of El Castellar overlooking Muslim Zaragoza from 1091 and the town of Ejea from 1113. He held the rank of count (Latin comes) from 1085, before that he was a lord (senior).

According to the Historia Roderici, he was captured in the battle of Morella on 14 August 1084 by the forces of Yusuf al-Mu'taman ibn Hud, king of Zaragoza, and Rodrigo Díaz de Vivar.

Between 1087 and 1113 he was responsible for the County of Navarre, the interior of the old Kingdom of Pamplona which had passed to King Sancho upon Pamplona's division in 1076. Nonetheless, Sancho Ramírez had done homage for Navarre to King Alfonso VI of Castile and so Sancho Sánchez acted in fact as Alfonso's vassal in Navarre. The latter is never referred to as Count of Navarre in royal documents, but only in documents of local origin. This is perhaps a sign that the status of Navarre proper between Aragon and Castile was not completely settled.

In January 1092, Sancho was still lord of San Esteban de Deyo, but by October he had been replaced by the bishop of Pamplona, Pedro de Roda.

According to the 14th-century Chronicle of San Juan de la Peña, in 1094 the inhabitants of Huesca in the taifa of Zaragoza, threatened by Sancho Ramírez, asked Alfonso VI for assistance in return for tribute. In response, Alfonso "sent Count Sancho with all of his forces to their aid, and the Castilian army moved up to Vitoria. As soon as the king of Aragon learned of this, he marched against the count with his men and his sons Pedro and Alfonso. The count did not expect him and was forced back into Castile." Francisco Bautista suggests that this episode would be better located in 1090 or in 1091, when Sancho Ramírez was building the castle of El Castellar between April and May.

Sancho made donations to the cathedral of Pamplona (between 1101 and 1104) and the Order of Saint John of Jerusalem. He appears in a contemporary document as count of Erro in 1113. In 1127, he issued a carta de arras for his wife, Elvira. This is his last appearance in the record and he probably died not long after.

== Family ==
Sancho was the son of Sancho Macerátiz, lord of Álava and Oca, and his wife, Andregoto. She was distantly related to the royal family, referring in a charter to avuncula mea regina domna Endrigoto (my [great-]aunt Queen Andregoto). From the time of José de Moret, writing in the 18th century, Sancho "Macerátiz" (a Basque nickname referring to physical deformity) has been erroneously identified with Sancho Garcés, an illegitimate son of King García III of Pamplona, thereby making Sancho Sánchez and his wife first cousins, but chronology proves the two to have been distinct men. An alternate theory once proposed was that Sancho Sánchez was a son of Sancho Fortuñones and brother of Fortún Sánchez, husband of Ermesenda, daughter of García III.

Sancho was brother-in-law of the Castilian count Gonzalo Salvadórez who married his sister Sancha, while his nephew, their son Gómez González, became the premier nobleman of queen Urraca of León and by tradition her lover.

Sancho's first marriage or marriages are unrecorded; they are known only from the existence of legitimate children not by his only known wife. His only known wife was Elvira, the second daughter of Count García Ordóñez and his wife, Urraca, daughter of King García III. They were married by 1094, when a charter refers to Sancho as a son-in-law of García Ordóñez. Sancho had a legitimate son, Gil Sánchez, and a daughter, María Sánchez, who married Count Diego López I de Haro. Sancho had eight other illegitimate children: Ramiro, Fernando, Andregoto, Sancha (Sancia de Aizuin), Sancha (Sanza d'Estaldun), Fortún, García and Fernando (Ferrando de Estaldum). All ten of his known sons and daughters shared in his inheritance. There were probably other children who died before Sancho and are not recorded in the limited surviving records.

== Sources ==
- Balparda y las Herrerías, Gregorio de (1933–34). Historia crítica de Vizcaya y de sus Fueros, Tomo II, Libro III: El primer fuero de Vizcaya, el de los Señores. Bilbao: Imprenta Mayli.
- Bautista, Francisco (2010). "Memoria y modelo: una lectura de la Historia Roderici". Journal of Medieval Iberian Studies. 2 (1): 1–30. doi:10.1080/17546551003619480. S2CID 144820990.
- Canal Sánchez-Pagín, J. M. (1986). "El conde leonés Don Fruela Díaz y su esposa, la navarra doña Estefanía Sánchez (siglos XI–XII)". Príncipe de Viana. 47 (177): 23–46.
- Canal Sánchez-Pagín, J. M. (1997). "El conde García Ordóñez, rival del Cid Campeador: su familia, sus servicios a Alfonso VI". Anuario de Estudios Medievales. 27 (2): 749–73. doi:10.3989/aem.1997.v27.i2.623.
- Canal Sánchez-Pagín, J. M. (2003). "El conde Gómez González de Candespina: su historia y su familia". Anuario de Estudios Medievales. 33 (1): 37–68. doi:10.3989/aem.2003.v33.i1.197.
- Fletcher, Richard A. (1989). The Quest for El Cid. New York: Alfred A. Knopf.
- García Larragueta, Santos Agustín (1957). El Gran Priorado de Navarra de la Orden de San Juan de Jerusalén, Siglos XII–XIII. 2 vols. Pamplona: Diputación Foral de Navarra.
- Martínez Díez, Gonzalo (1999). El Cid histórico: un estudio exhaustivo sobre el verdadero Rodrigo Díaz de Vivar. Barcelona: Editorial Planeta.
- Laliena Corbera, Carlos (1996). La formación del estado feudal: Aragón y Navarra en la época de Pedro I. Huesca: Instituto de Estudios Altoaragoneses.
- Lema Pueyo, José Angel (1991). "Alfonso I "El Batallador" y el Condado de Navarra". Mundaiz (41): 67–76.
- Martín Duque, Ángel J. (1998). "Navarra y Aragón". In Miguel Ángel Ladero Quesada (ed.). La Reconquista y el proceso de diferenciación política (1035–1217). Espasa-Calpe. pp. 237–323.
- Narbaitz, Pierre (2007). Navarra o cuando los vascos tenían reyes. Tafalla: Editorial Txalaparta.
- Pedro IV de Aragón (1991). Nelson, Lynn H. (ed.). The Chronicle of San Juan de la Peña: A Fourteenth-century Official History of the Crown of Aragon. Philadelphia: University of Pennsylvania Press.
- Salazar Acha, Jaime de (1992). "Reflexiones sobre la posible historicidad de un episodio de la Crónica Najerense". Príncipe de Viana (in Spanish). 55 (201): 149–56. ISSN 0032-8472.
- "Sancho Sánchez". Gran Enciclopedia Navarra.
- Ubieto Arteta, Antonio (1952). "Doña Andregoto Galíndez, reina de Pamplona y condesa de Aragón". Actas del Primer Congreso Internacional de Estudios Pirenáicos. 6: 165–79.
- Ubieto Arteta, Antonio (1958). "¿Donde estuvo el panteón de los primeros reyes pamploneses?". Príncipe de Viana. 19 (72–73): 267–77.
- Ubieto Arteta, Antonio (1963). "Una leyenda del 'Camino': la muerte de Ramiro I de Aragón". Príncipe de Viana. 24 (90–91): 5–27.
