= Urraca Fernández =

10th-century queen of León and Navarre

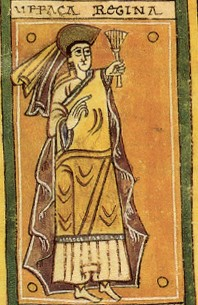
- Urraca Fernández, from the Codex Vigilanus

Queen consort of Leon
- Tenure: 951 – 956
- Tenure: 958 – 950

Queen Consort of Navarre
- Tenure: 22 February 970 - December 994
- Died: 1007
- Spouse: Ordoño III of León; Ordoño IV of León; Sancho II of Pamplona
- Issue: Bermudo II of León; García Sánchez II of Pamplona; Ramiro; Gonzalo; Urraca Sanchez
- House: Beni Mamaduna
- Father: Fernán González
- Mother: Sancha Sánchez of Pamplona

Urraca Fernández (died 1007) was queen of León and Navarre as the wife of two kings of León and one king of Navarre between 951 and 994. She acted as regent for her son Gonzalo in the County of Aragon in c. 996–997, and served as co-regent of the Kingdom of Navarre, along with her daughter-in-law Jimena Fernández and the bishops of Navarre, during the minor regency of her grandson Sancho III c. 1004–1010.

== Life ==
She was infanta of Castile and daughter of Count Fernán González and queen Sancha Sánchez of Pamplona.

She was first married by her father to Ordoño III of León in 951. By him she had one child:

- Bermudo II of León, whose maternity is subject to scholarly debate

In 958, after Ordoño's death, she was remarried to Ordoño IV. He died in 960.

Her third and most important marriage was contracted in 962 to Sancho II of Pamplona. Both Sancho and Urraca were grandchildren of Sancho I of Pamplona. With Sancho, she had several children:

- García Sánchez II of Pamplona
- Ramiro (died 992)
- Gonzalo, who ruled the County of Aragon with Urraca as regent
- Urraca Sanchez, nicknamed "the Basque", adopted the Arabic name Abda after being given to Almanzor Ruler of Al-Andalus by her father Sancho II of Pamplona. Urraca and Almanzor had a single son, named Abd al-Rahman Sanchuelo that became chief minister of Hisham II, Caliph of Córdoba.
