= Galindo Aznárez II =

Galindo Aznárez II (died 922) was Count of Aragon from 893 to 922. He was the son of Aznar Galíndez II and his wife Onneca Garcés, daughter of King García Íñiguez of Pamplona.

== Life ==
Galindo succeeded his father as Count of Aragon. In 905 he was part of a coalition that sponsored a coup d'état in Pamplona in favor of his brother-in-law, Sancho I, that overthrew the ruling Íñiguez dynasty which was replaced by the Jiménez dynasty, another branch that was more favorable to the interests of Aragon. However, he turned on this new king and on 911 attacked him in concert with brother-in-law Muhammad al-Tawil and Abd Allah ibn Lubb al-Qasawi. This coalition was defeated, al-Tawil killed, and Galindo forced to become vassal of Sancho.

== Marriages and issue ==
Galindo was married twice. By his first wife, Acibella, daughter of Count García II Sánchez of Gascony, and his wife Amuna of Périgord, he had three children:

- Toda Galíndez, married to Bernat I, Count of Ribagorza, to whom she brought Sobrarbe.
- Redemptus Galíndez, bishop.
- Mirón Galíndez, who probably died before his father since he did not inherit the county in spite of being a legitimate son.

By his second wife, Sancha Garcés of Pamplona, daughter of García Jiménez and Onneca Rebelle of Sangüesa, and half-sister of Sancho I, he had:

- Andregoto Galíndez, who inherited the Aragonese county. She was queen of Pamplona by her marriage with her first cousin García Sanchez, king of Pamplona (925–970).
- Velasquita Galíndez, first married Íñigo López de Estigi y Ciligueta. She could also have been the wife of Count Fortún Jiménez of Aragon (fl. 943–958).

Galindo also sired several illegitimate sons: Guntislo, Sancho, Belasco, Banzo—father of a Galindo—and Aznar.

== Bibliography ==
- Iglesias Costa, Manuel (2001). Historia del Condado de Ribagorza (PDF) (in Spanish). Instituto de Estudios Altoaragoneses. Diputación de Huesca. ISBN 84-8127-121-7. Archived from the original (PDF) on 2014-09-14.
- Martín Duque, Ángel J. (2002). "Vasconia en la alta edad media: somera aproximación histórica". Príncipe de Viana (in Spanish) (227). Pamplona: Institución Príncipe de Viana: 871–908. ISSN 0032-8472.
- Lacarra de Miguel, José María (1945). "Textos navarros del Códice de Roda" (PDF). Estudios de Edad Media de la Corona de Aragón (in Spanish). 1: 193–284. OCLC 694519776. Archived from the original (PDF) on 2016-03-03.
- Lacarra de Miguel, José María (1980). "Acerca de las fronteras en el Valle del Ebro (Siglos VIII-XIII)" (PDF). En la España Medieval (in Spanish) (1): 181–192. ISSN 0214-3038. Archived from the original (PDF) on 2017-02-21.
- Settipani, Christian (2004). La noblesse du midi carolingien: études sur quelques grandes familles d'Aquitaine et du Languedoc du IXe siècle (in French). Oxford Univ. Unit for Prosopographical Research. ISBN 9781900934046.
- Ubieto Arteta, Antonio (1989). Historia de Aragón, VI: Orígenes de Aragón. Zaragoza: Anubar.

Preceded by Aznar Galíndez II	Count of Aragon; 893–922	Succeeded by Andregoto Galíndez
