= Andregoto Galíndez =

Queen of Pamplona c. 930s

Queen consort of Pamplona
- Tenure: c. 930s

Queen of Lumbier
- Reign: c. 971
- Spouse: García Sánchez I of Pamplona
- Issue: Sancho II of Pamplona
- Father: Galindo Aznárez II
- Mother: Sancha Garcés of Pamplona

Andregoto Galíndez, of the County of Aragon, was the Queen of Pamplona by marriage to García Sánchez I, prior to being divorced by him before the year 940. She was the mother of Sancho II of Pamplona.

Andregoto was one of two daughters born to Galindo II Aznárez, Count of Aragon, by his second wife, Sancha Garcés of Pamplona, a half-sister of King Sancho I of Pamplona. Her father's County of Aragon had been brought into the Kingdom of Pamplona under Sancho I, and following Galindo's death in 922 was held by a Count Guntislo, apparently her illegitimate half-brother, Guntislo Galíndez. Her father's other County of Sobrarbe went to Andregoto's half-sister, Toda Galíndez, in her marriage to Count Bernard I of Ribagorza. Andregoto's marriage to Sancho's only son, then ruling Pamplona as García Sánchez I, likely occurred sometime in the mid-930s.

Prior to 940, García divorced Andregoto, presumably on the grounds of consanguinity since both were grandchildren of García Jiménez of Pamplona. Together they had a sole son, Sancho II of Pamplona, though she may also have been mother of García's two daughters, whose maternity is unknown or disputed: Toda, who is mentioned in 991 as sister of King Sancho, and Urraca, who married firstly Fernán González of Castile, and secondly William II Sánchez of Gascony.

In 971, she was ruling her own subkingdom, in the area of Lumbier.

It has been suggested that Andregoto remarried and had further children, although details of this have not been discovered. Endregota, wife of 11th-century nobleman Sancho Macerátiz and mother of his son Sancho Sánchez, calls Queen Andregoto avuncula ('maternal aunt'), probably indicating that Endregota descended from a sister of the queen. Ubierto Arteta suggested a descent from Andregoto's full-sister, Velasquita Galíndez.

== Sources ==
- Martínez Díez, Gonzalo (2005). El Condado de Castilla (711-1038): la historia frente a la leyenda (in Spanish). 2 volumes. Valladolid. ISBN 84-9718-275-8.
- Martínez Díez, Gonzalo (2007). Sancho III el Mayor Rey de Pamplona, Rex Ibericus (in Spanish). Madrid: Marcial Pons Historia. ISBN 978-84-96467-47-7.
- Salazar y Acha, Jaime de (2006). "Urraca. Un nombre egregio en la onomástica altomedieval". En la España medieval (in Spanish) (1): 29–48. ISSN 0214-3038.
- Ubierto Arteta, Antonio (1952). "Doña Andregoto Galindez, reina de Pamplona y condesa de Aragón". Actas del primer congreso internacional de estudios pirenáicos (in Spanish). 6: 165–179. OCLC 36761875.

Preceded by Toda Aznárez	Queen consort of Pamplona; 930s	Succeeded by Teresa Ramírez
