= Royal Monastery of San Juan de la Peña =

Monastery in Huesca, Spain

Coordinates: 42°30′28.80″N 0°39′59.40″W

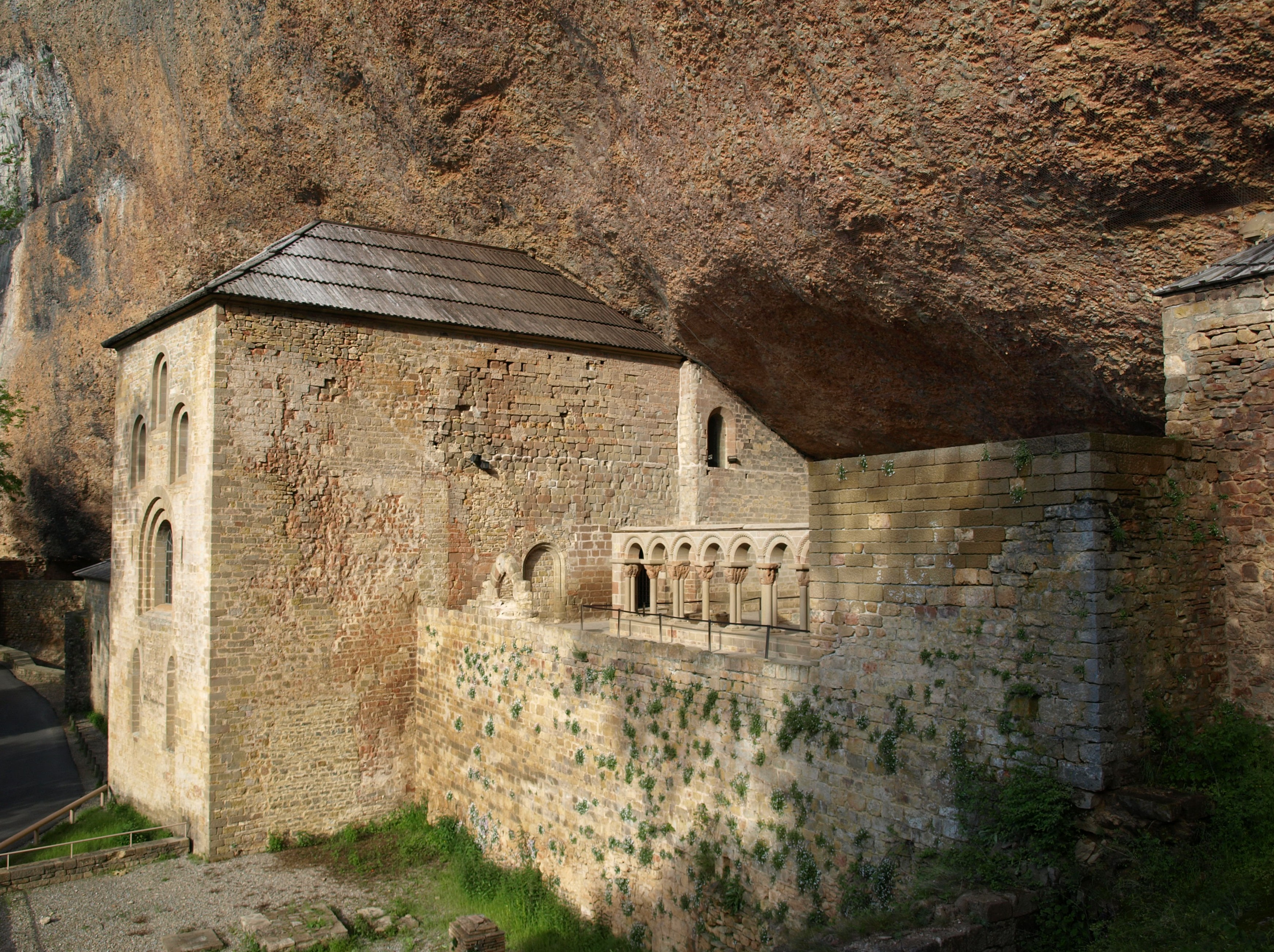
San Juan de la Peña.

The monastery of San Juan de la Peña (Spanish: Real Monasterio de San Juan de la Peña) is a religious complex in the town of Santa Cruz de la Serós, at the south-west of Jaca, in the province of Huesca, Spain. It was one of the most important monasteries in Aragon in the Middle Ages. Its two-level church is partially carved in the stone of the great cliff that overhangs the foundation. San Juan de la Peña means "Saint John of the Cliff".

The New Monastery of San Juan de la Peña was built in 1705 at a plateau further up the mountain.

The lower church includes some Mozarabic architectural surviving elements, although most of the parts of the monastery (including the impressive cloister, under the great rock) are Romanesque. After the fire of 1675, a new monastery was built. The old monastery (built in 920) was declared a National Monument on 13 July 1889, and the new monastery in 1923. In the 11th century the monastery became part of the Benedictine Order and was the first monastery in Spain to use the Latin Mass.

The cloister, built ca. 1190, contains a series of capitals with Biblical scenes that originally were arranged in chronological sequence, a design found elsewhere in the region.

The monastery is built beneath a huge rock sometimes associated with the legendary "Monte Pano". The second floor contains a royal pantheon of kings of Aragon and Navarre. The present room, with its marbles and stucco medallions recalling historic battles, is mainly a design built during the administration of Charles III of Spain in 1770. It contains the resting places of the following kings of Aragón: Ramiro I, Sancho Ramírez, and Peter I of Aragon and Navarre. In August 2026, the bones of the three kings were removed for safekeeping as wildfires encroached on the site.

Legend said that the chalice of the Last Supper (Holy Grail) was sent to the monastery for protection and prevention from being captured by the Muslim invaders of the Iberian Peninsula. It is alleged to be the same cup that was presented in 1438 by Alfonso V of Aragon to the Valencia Cathedral. See Santo cáliz for further details.

The monastery is the namesake of the Chronicle of San Juan de la Peña, which was partially researched and composed there.

== Gallery ==
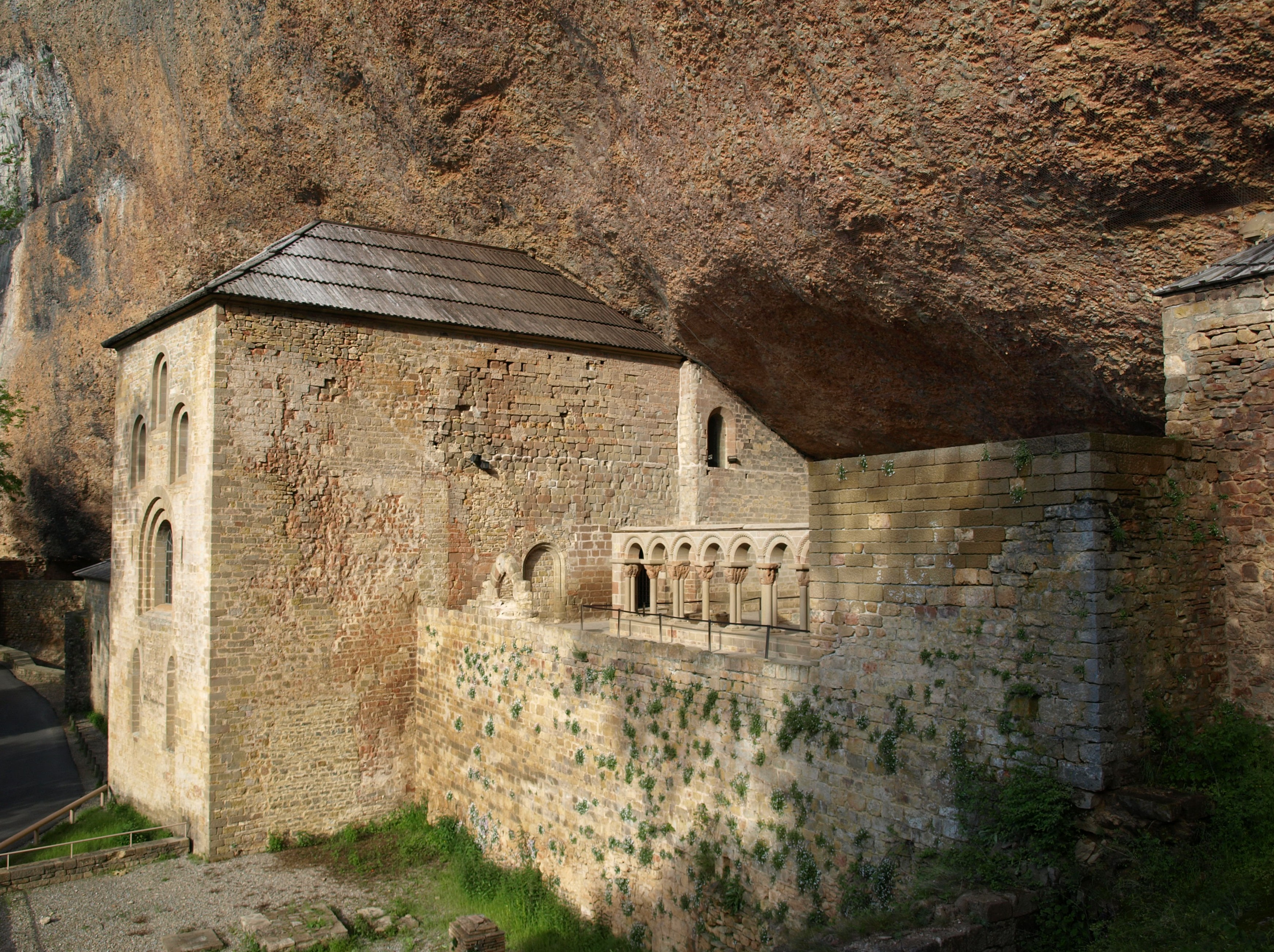

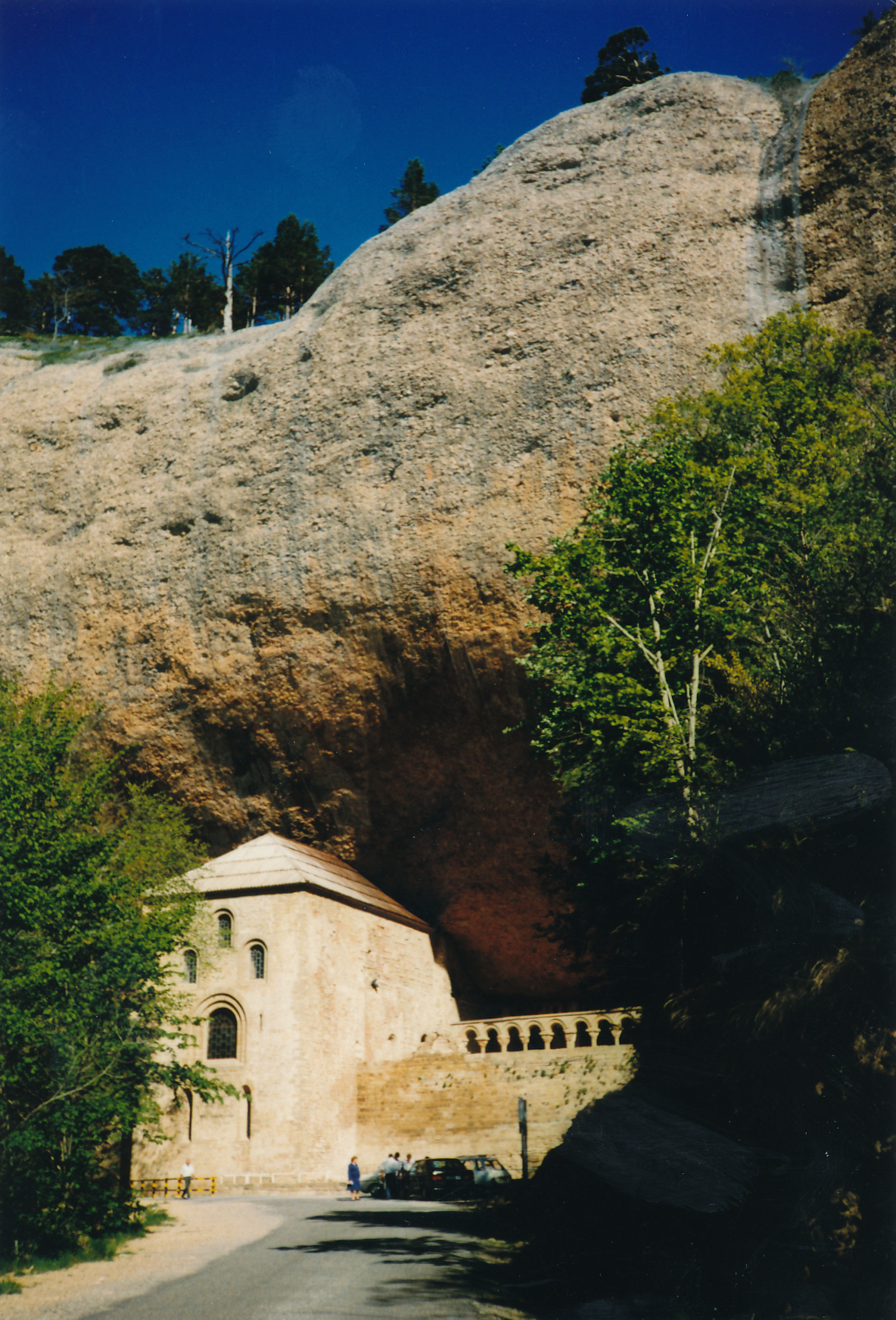

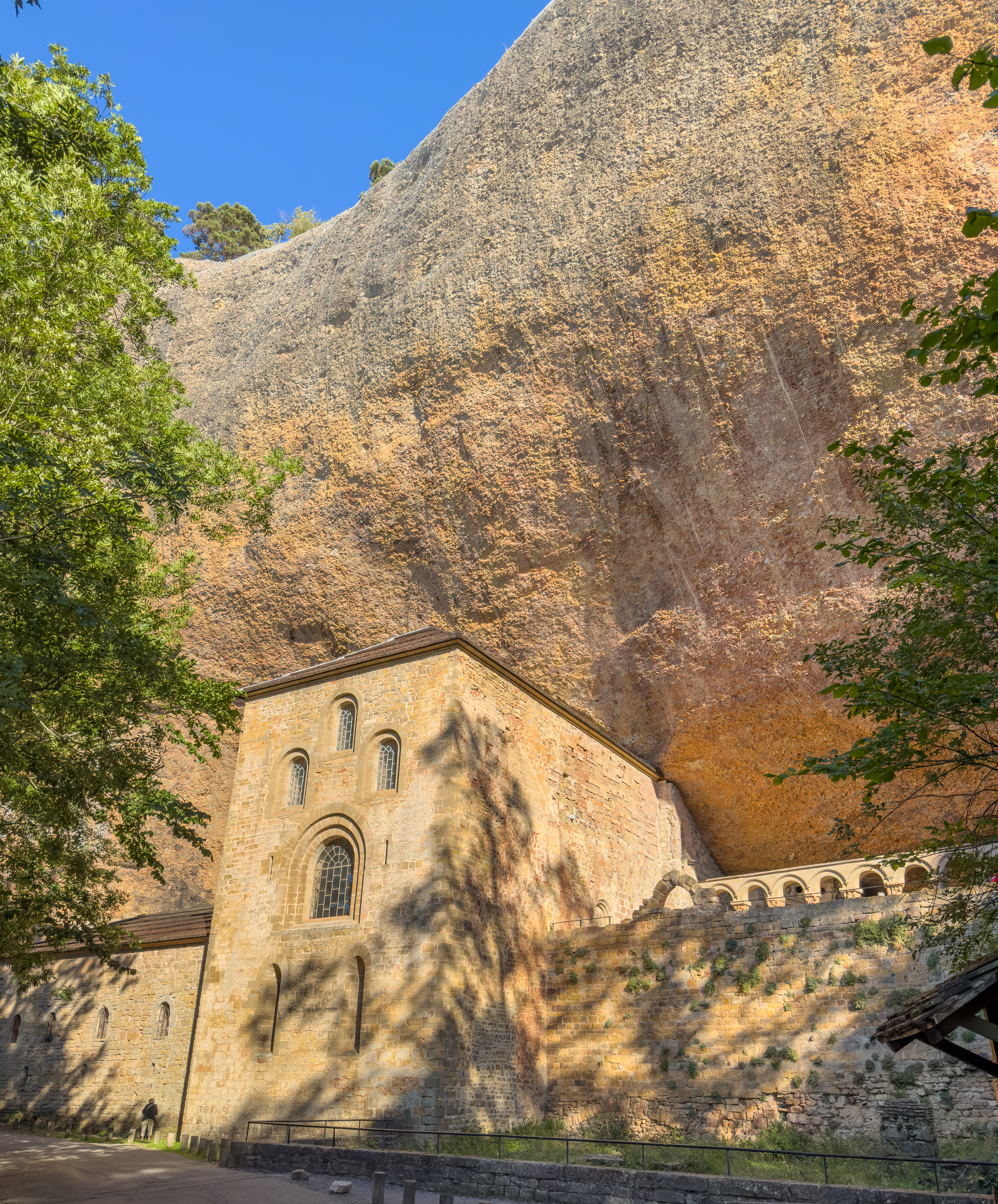

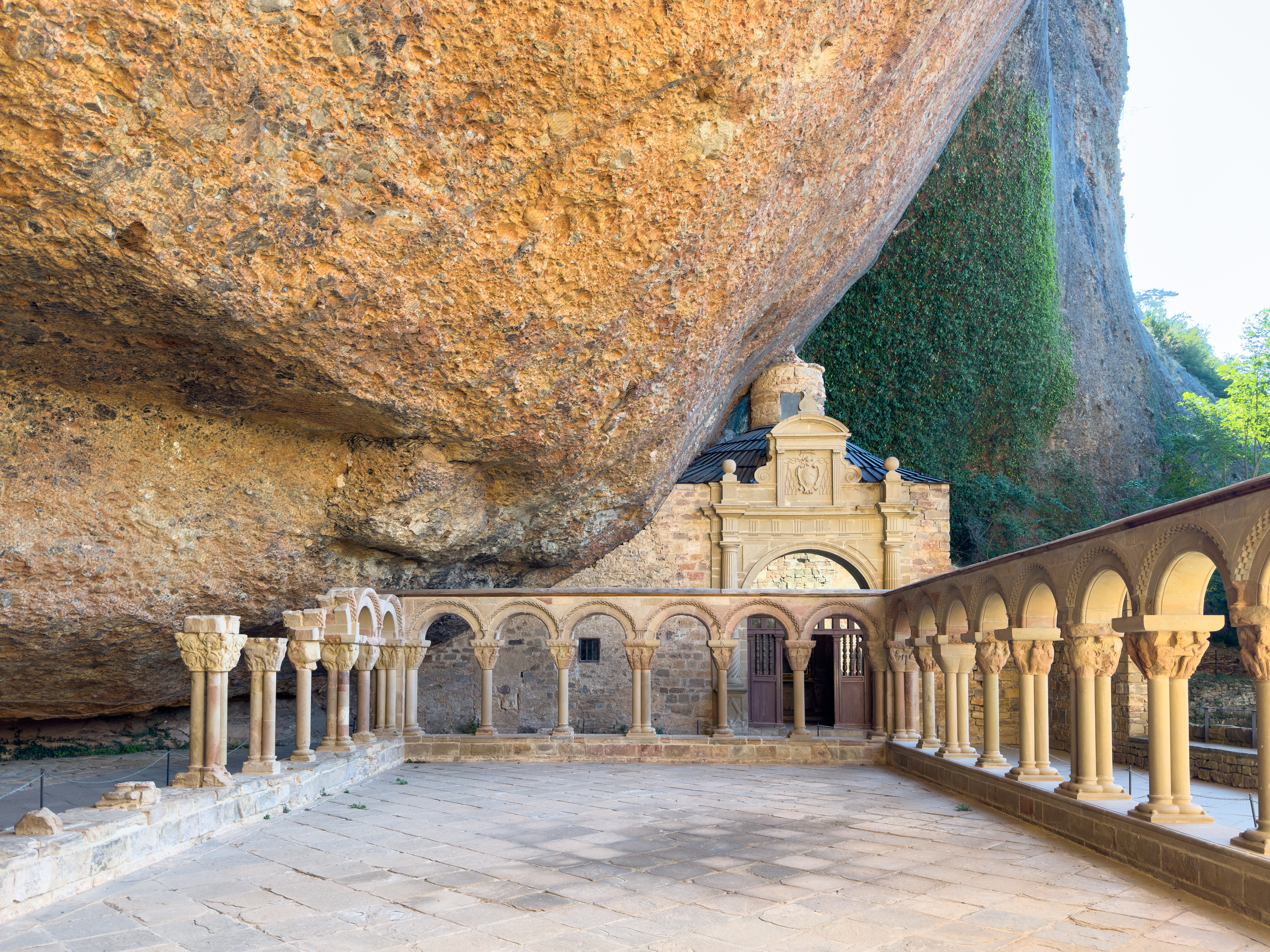

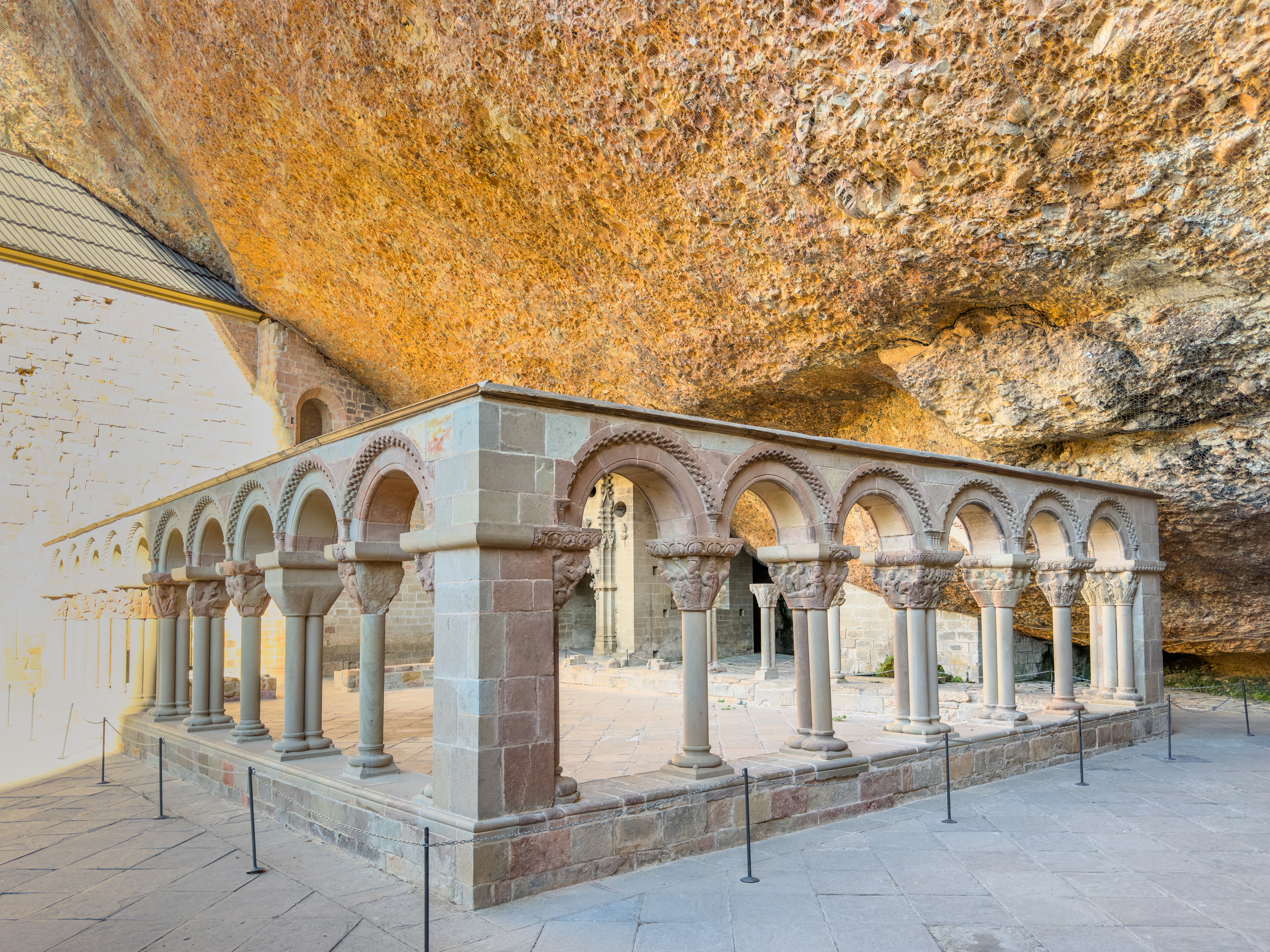

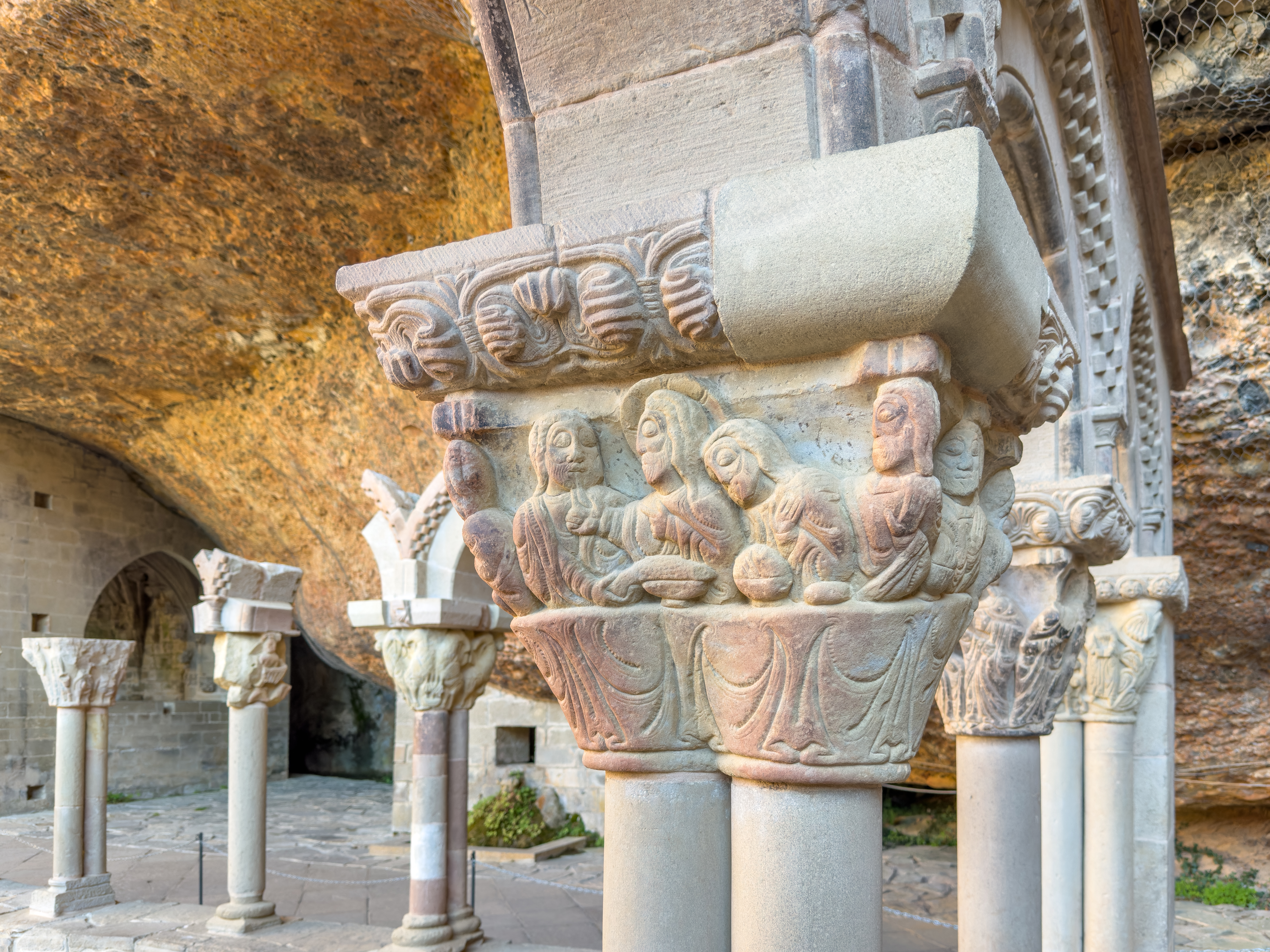

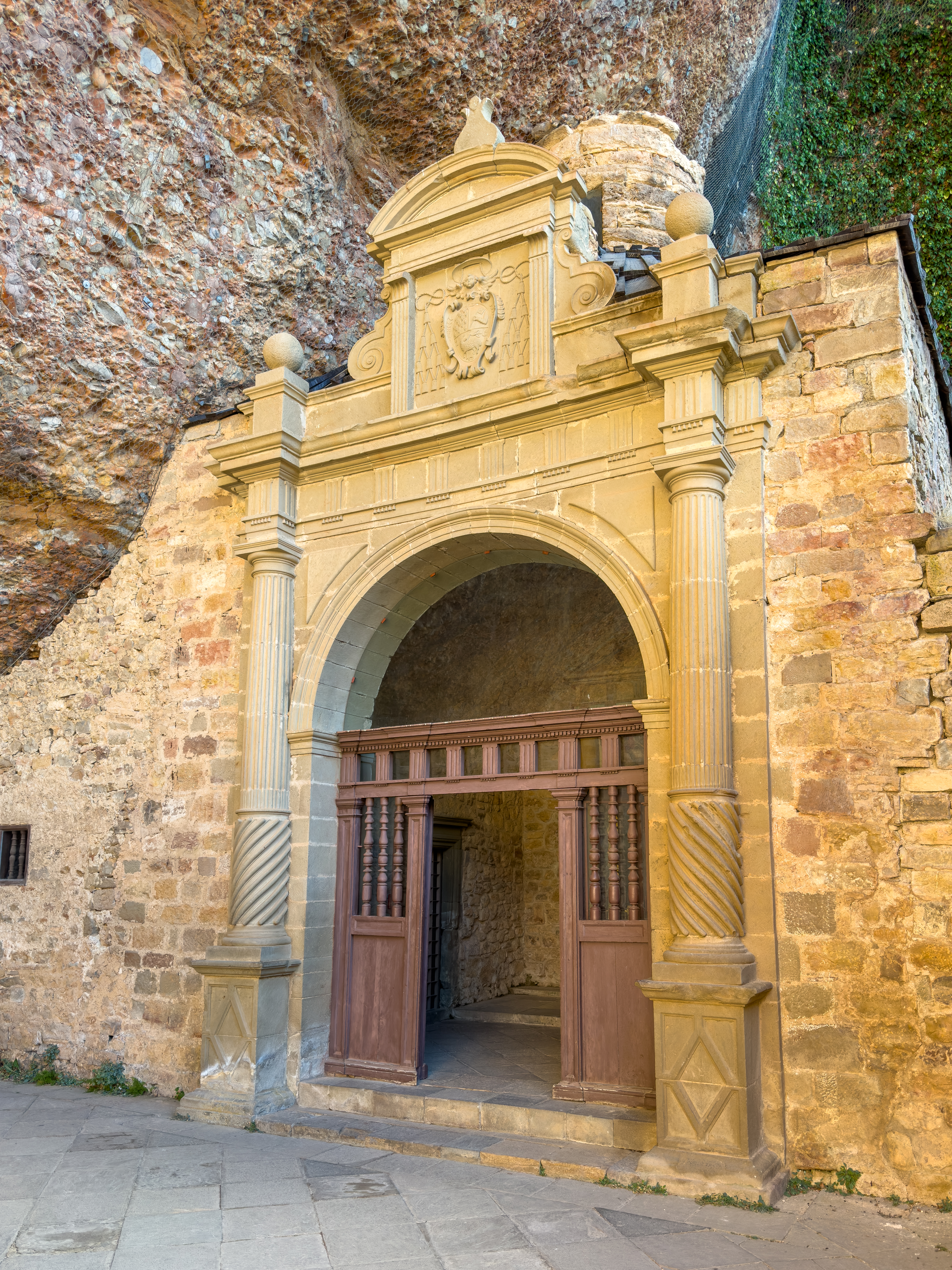

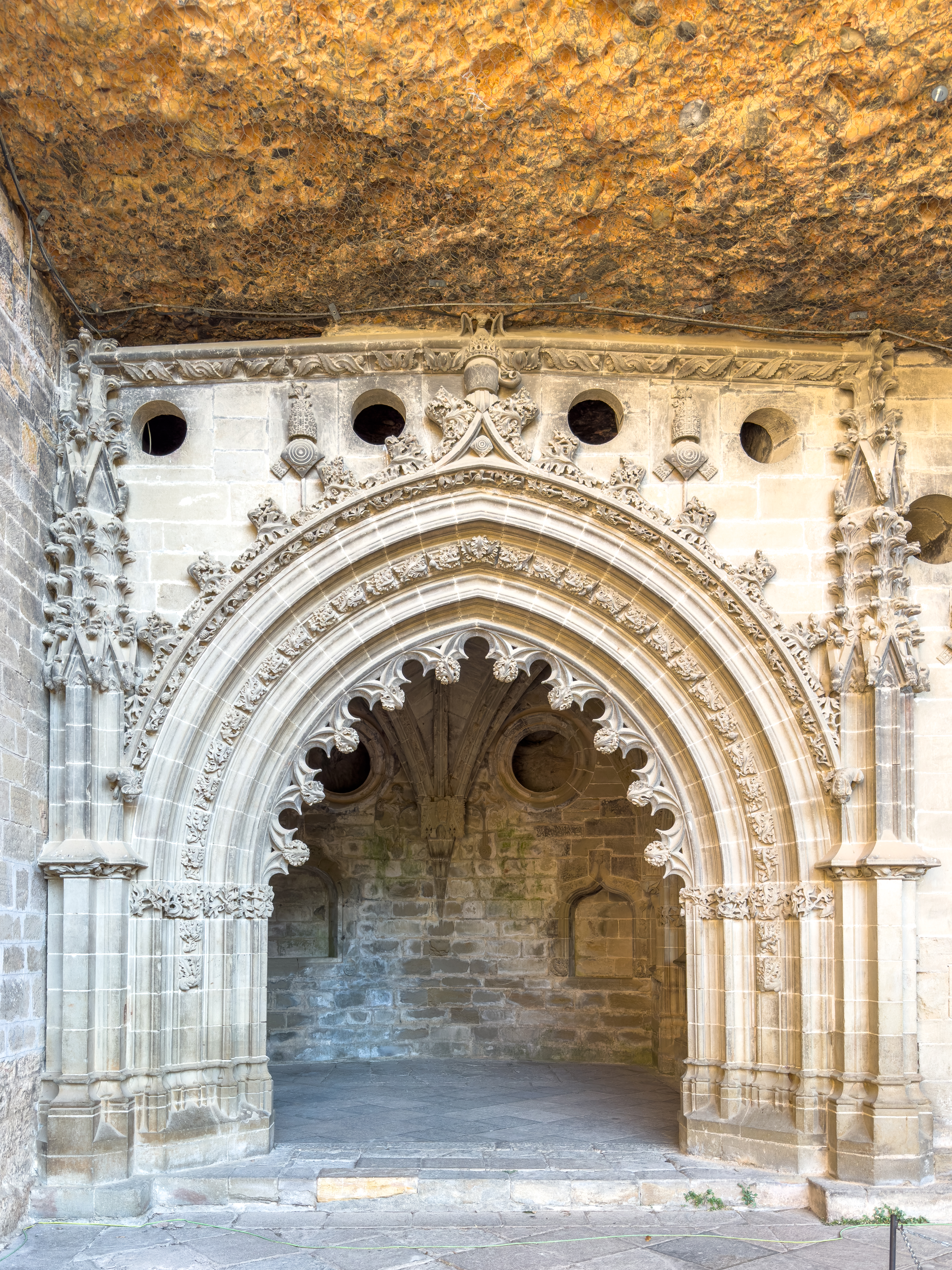

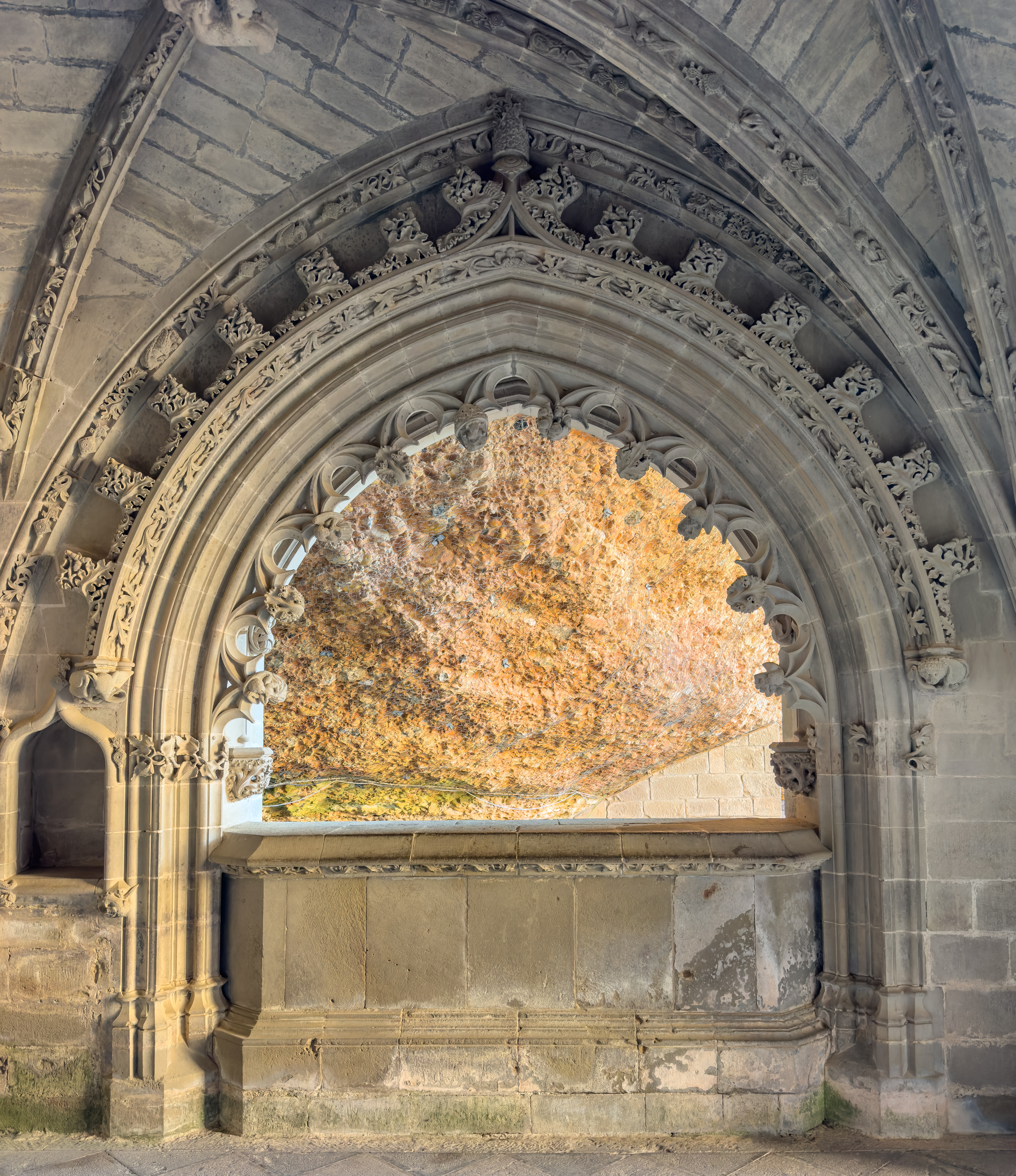

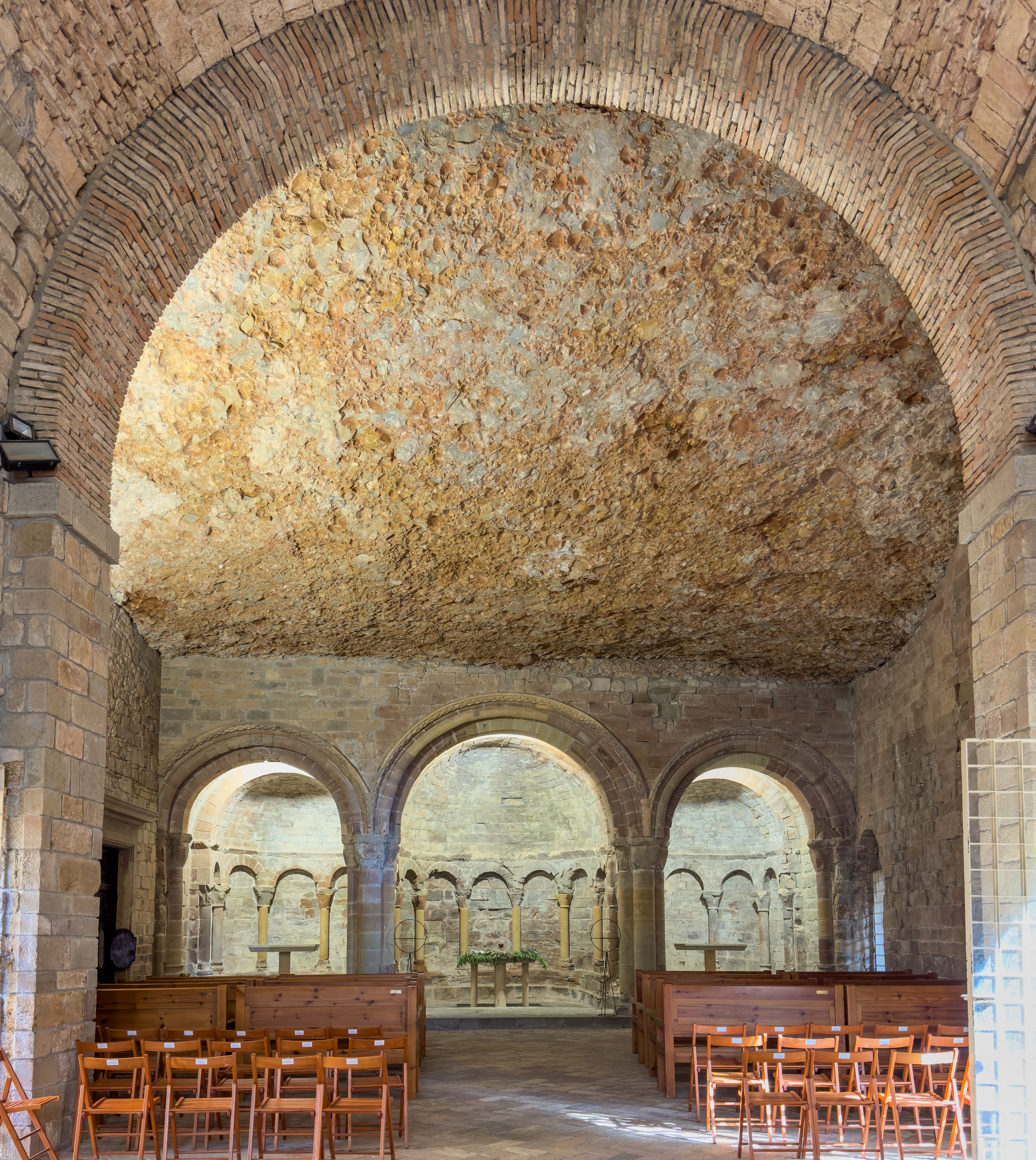

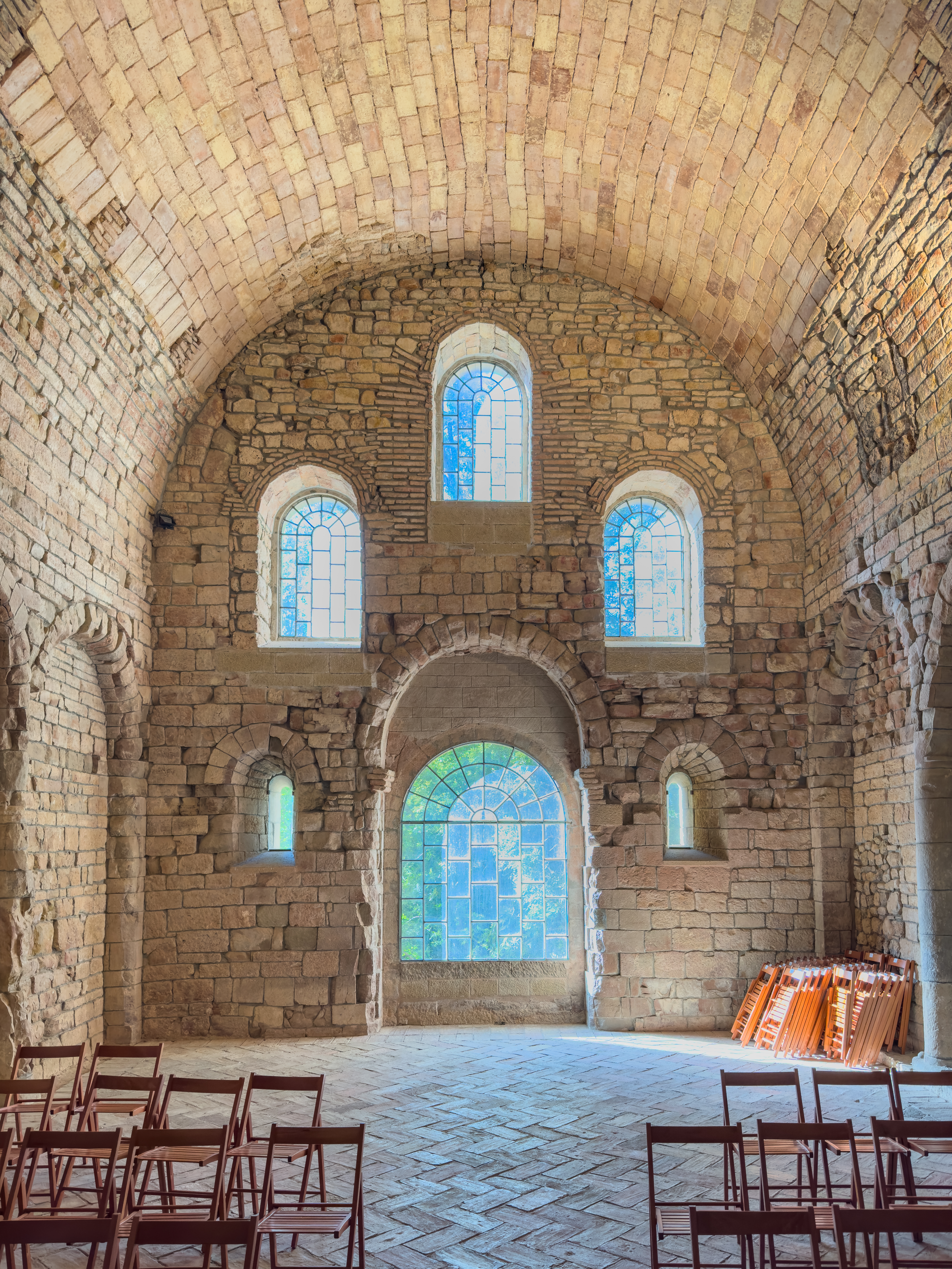

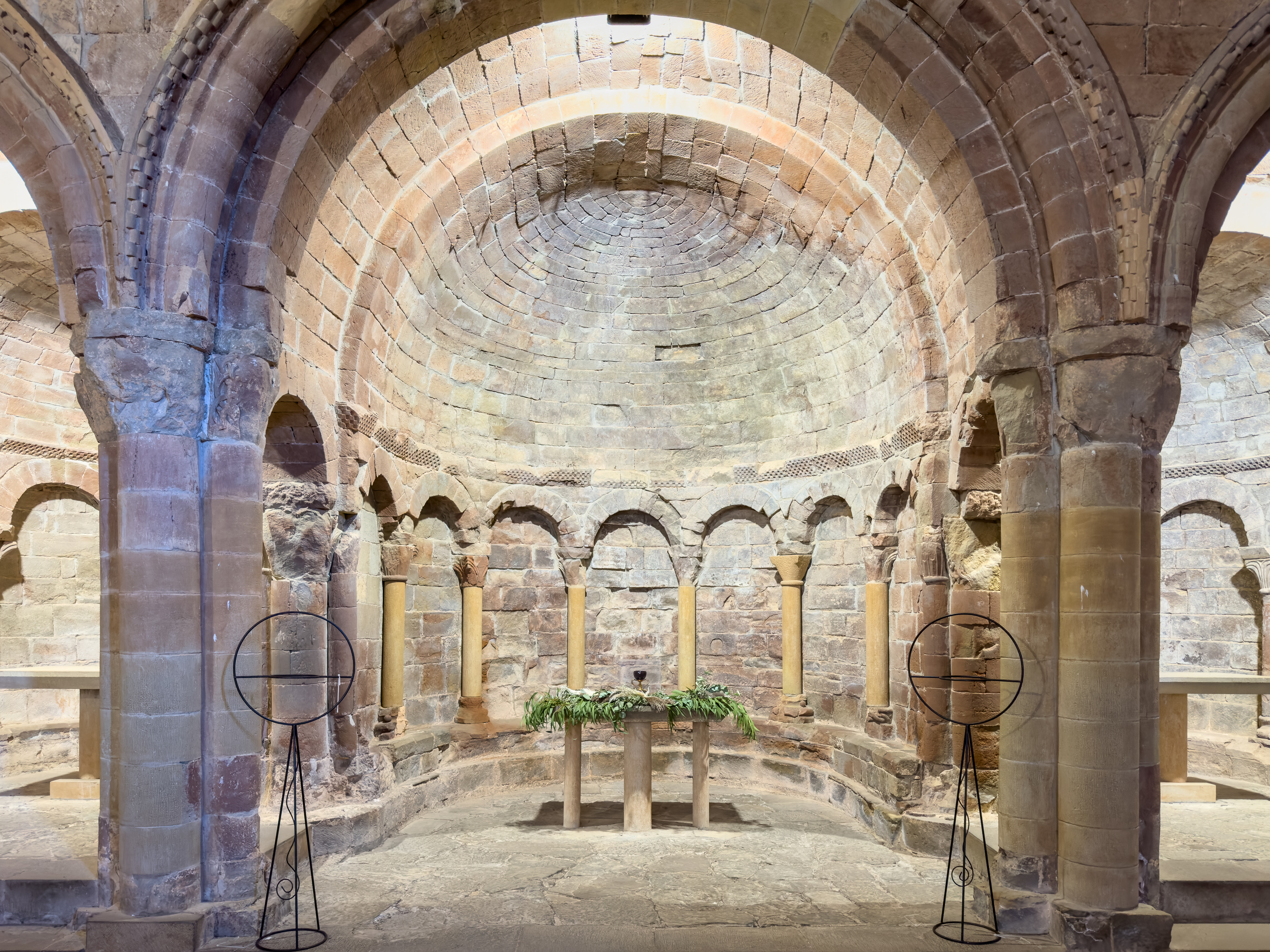

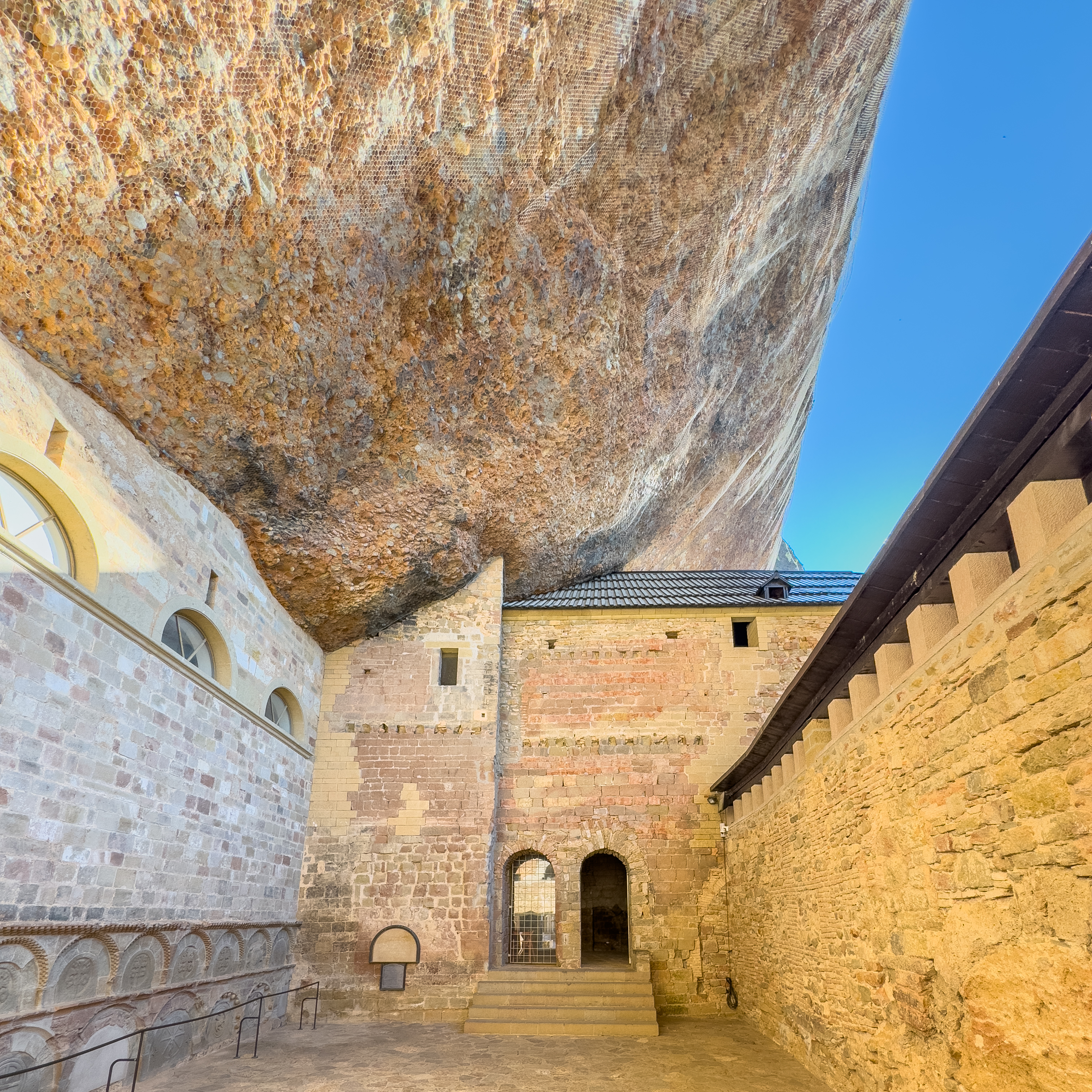

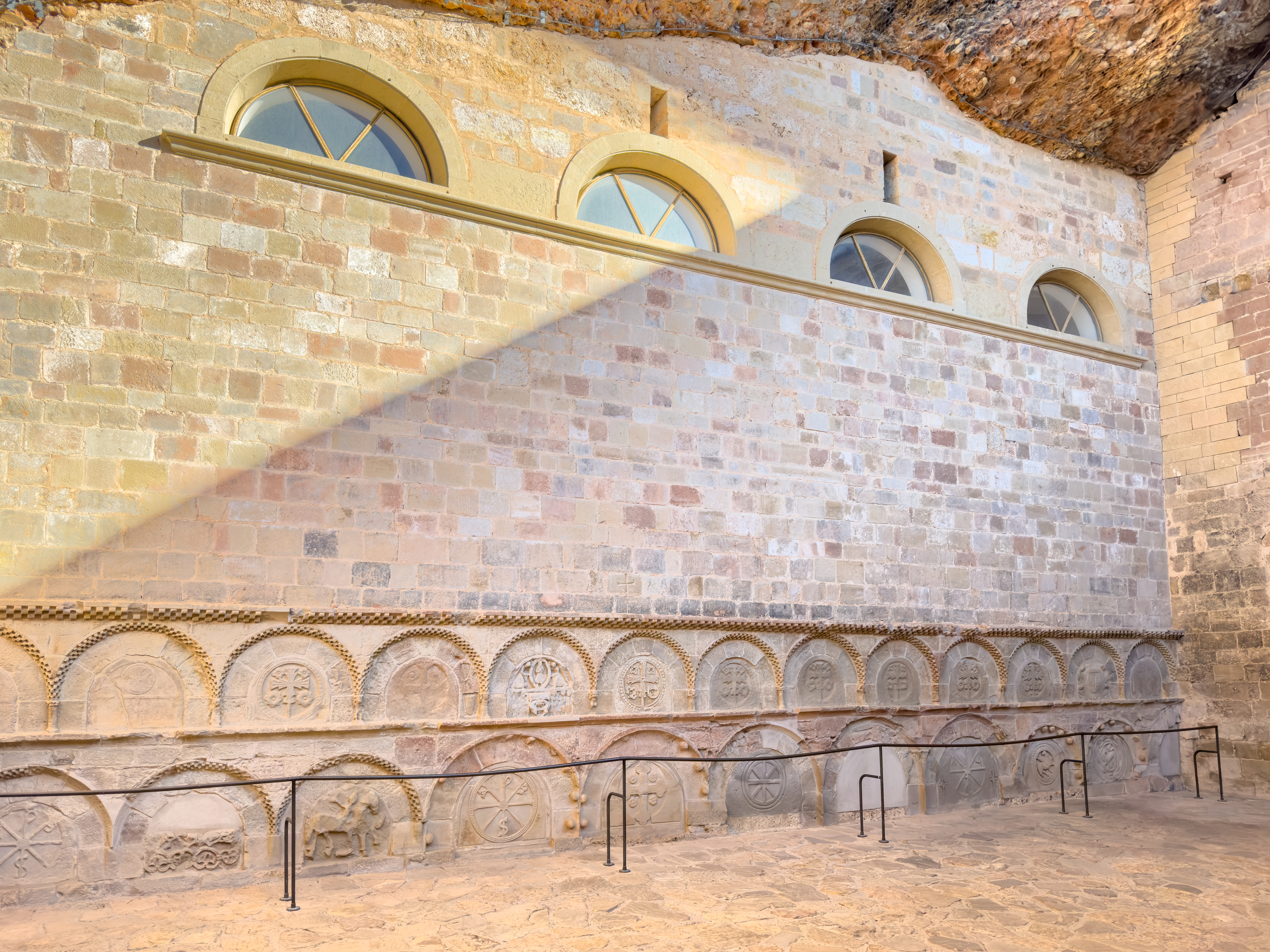

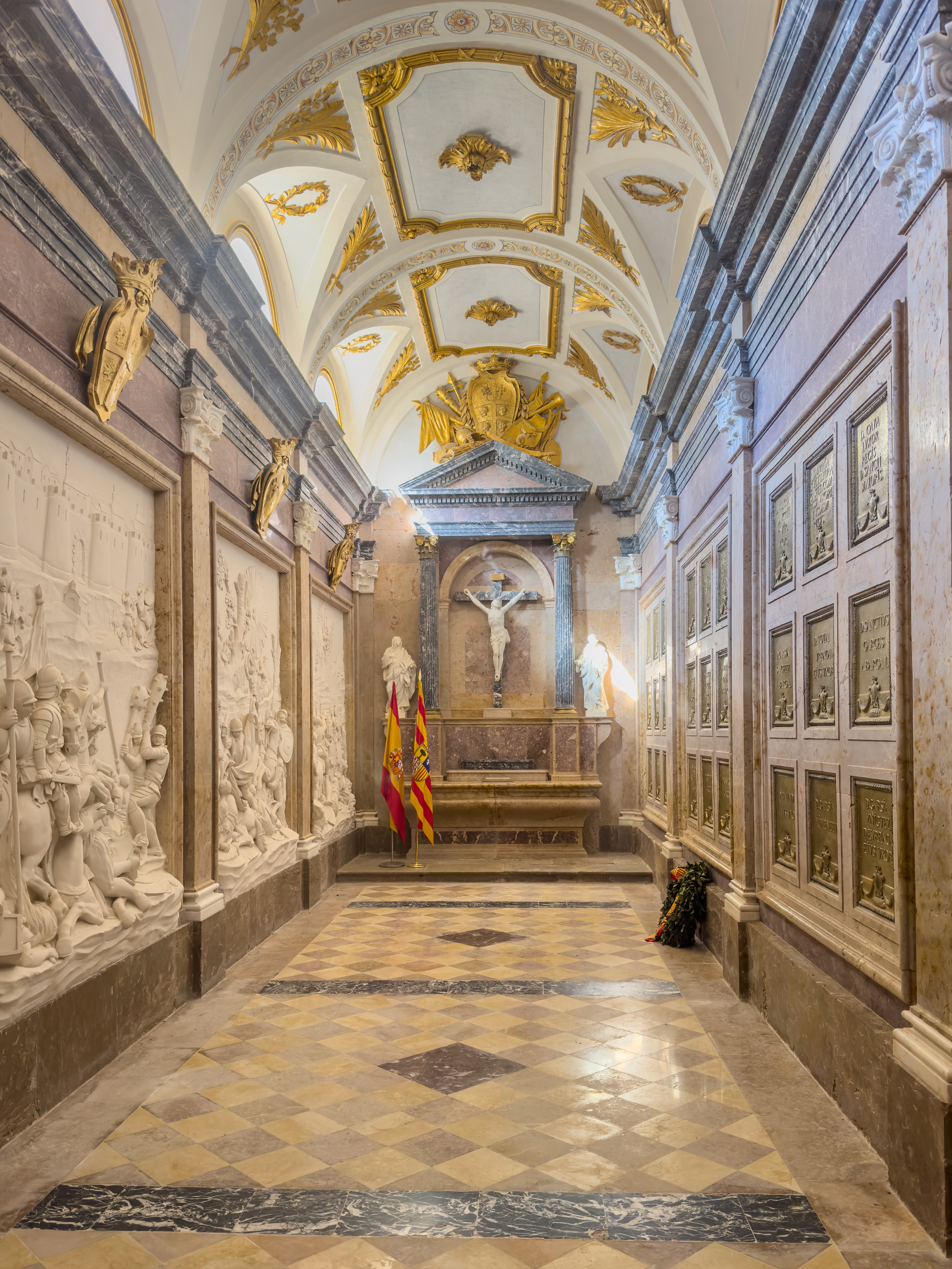

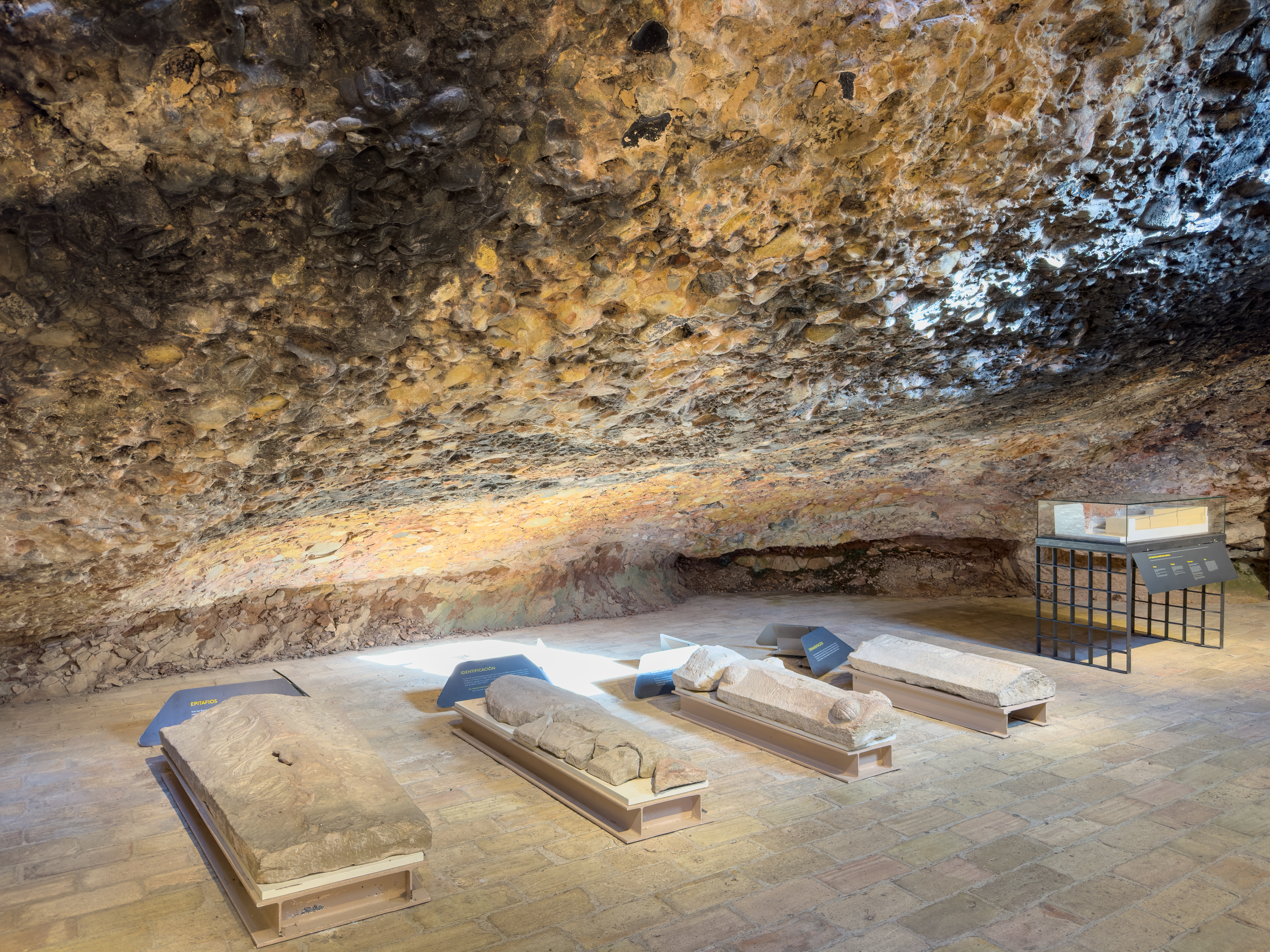

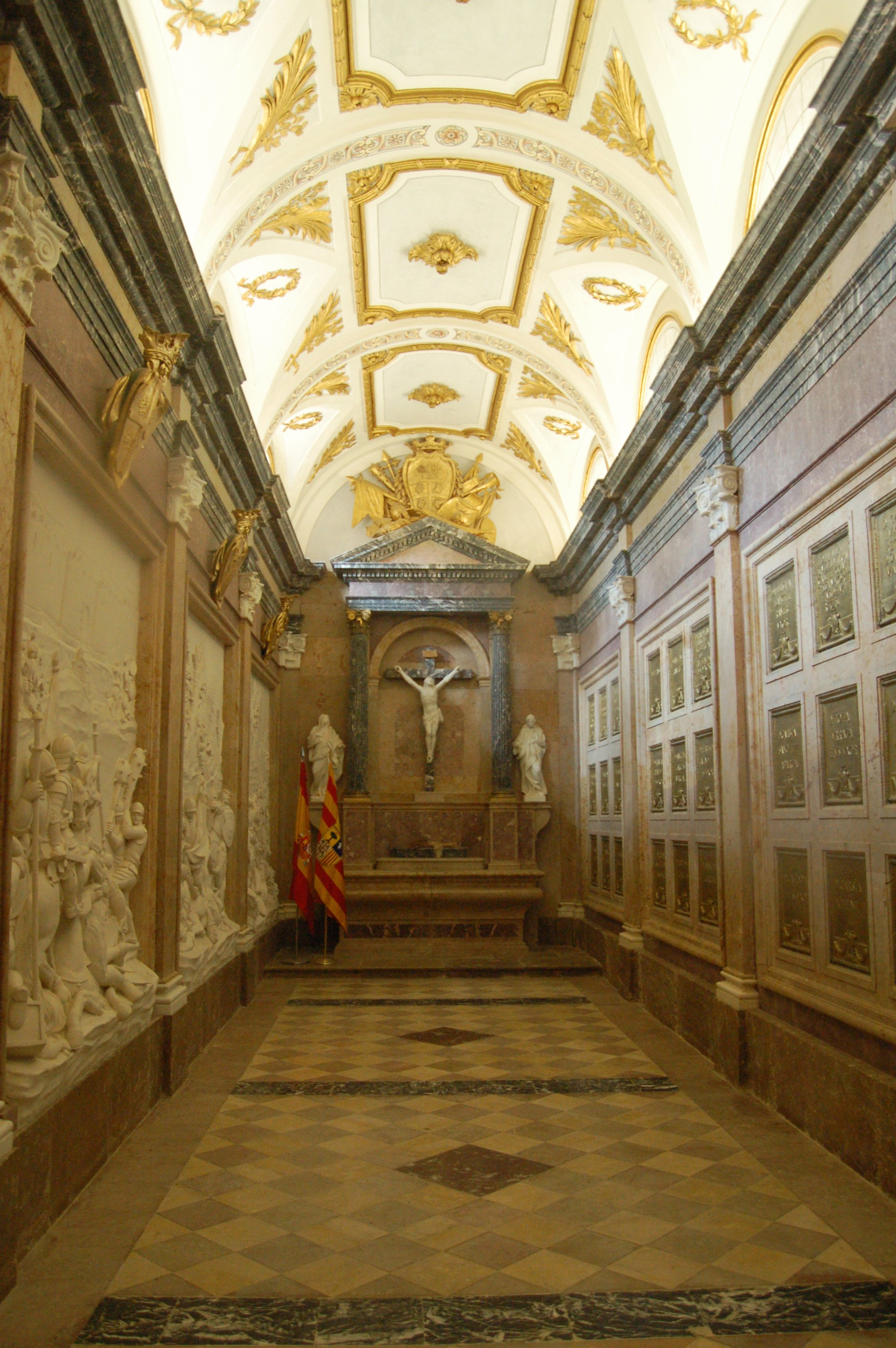

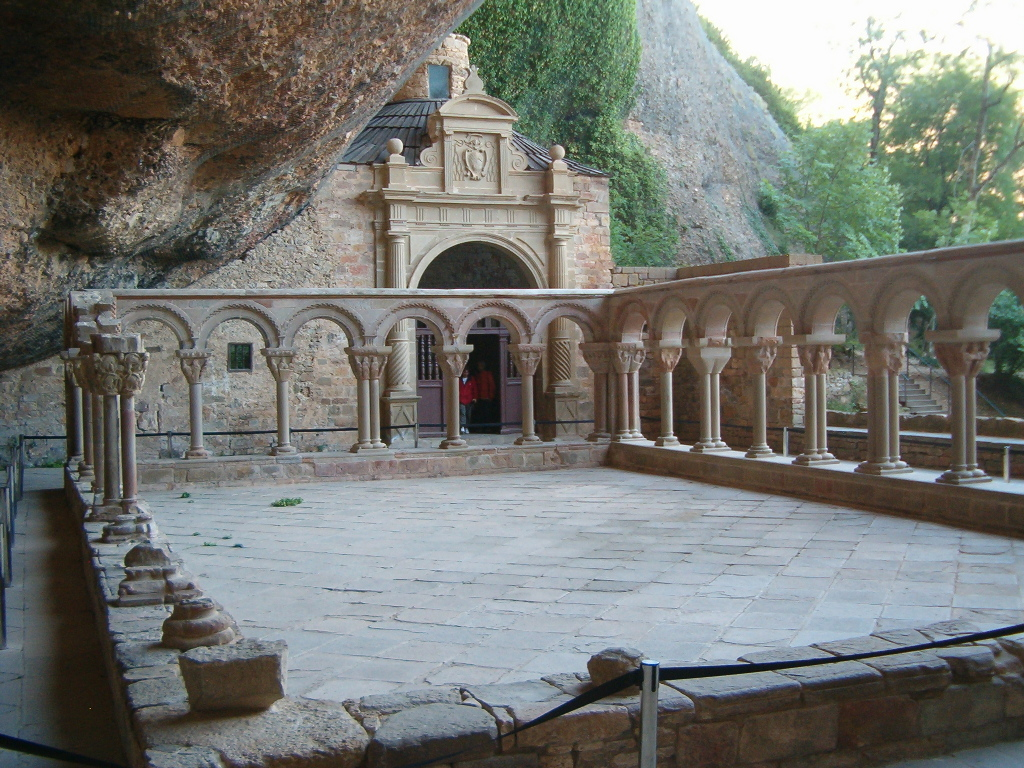

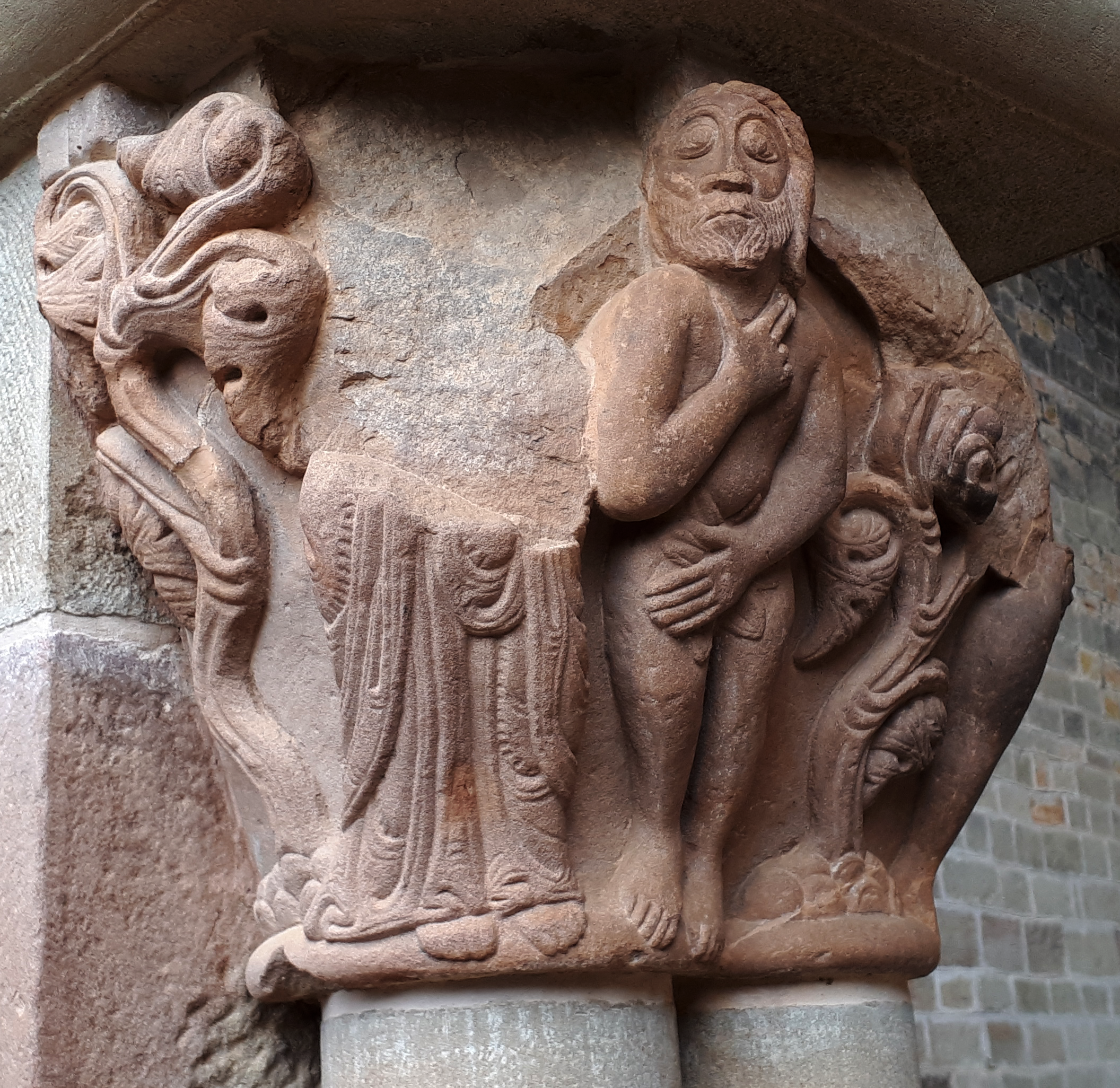

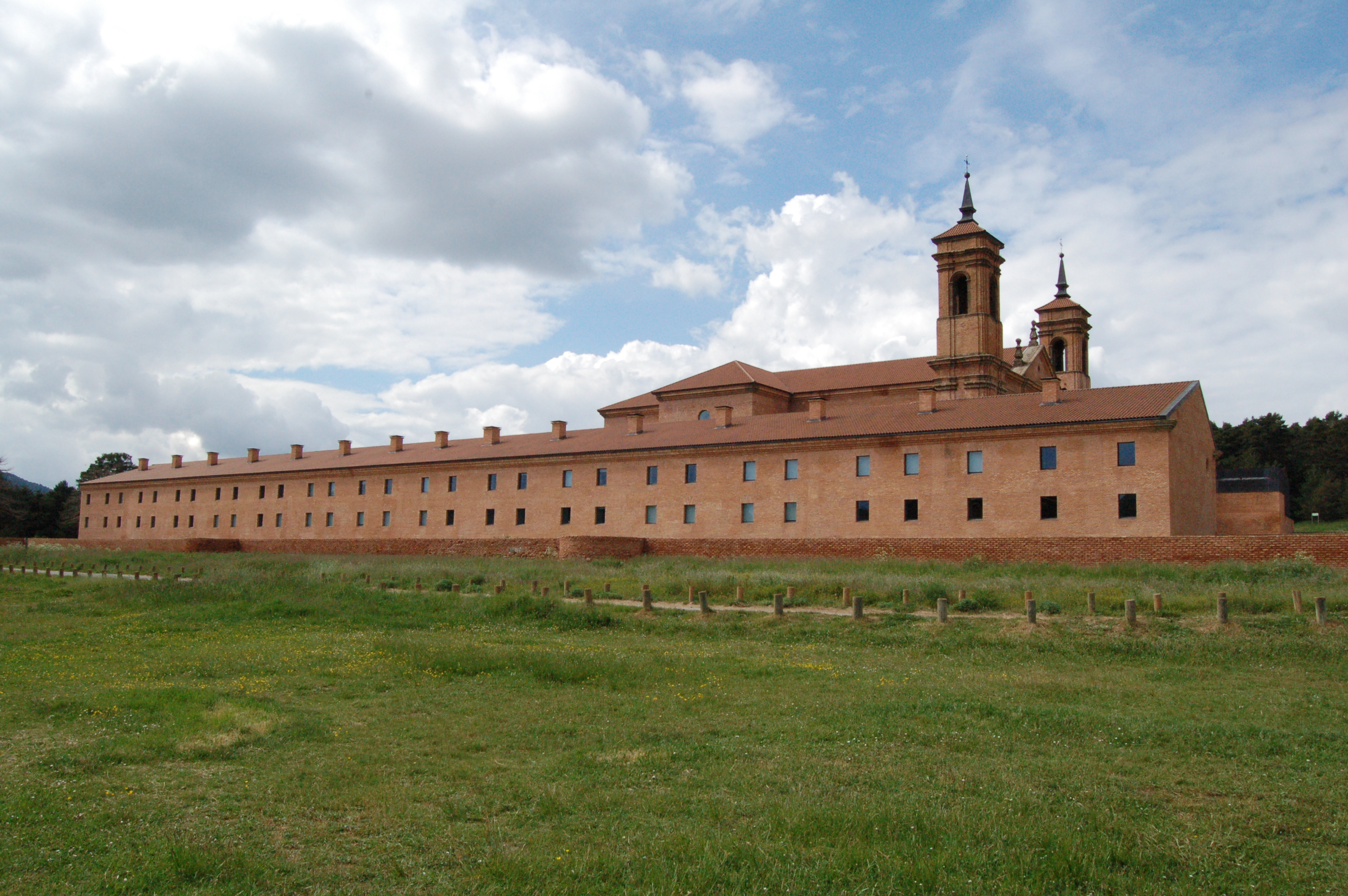
