= Family tree of Navarrese monarchs =

This is a family tree of monarchs of Navarre from Íñigo Arista until the accession of Henry III of Navarre to the throne of France.

The colors denote the monarchs from the:

- House of Íñiguez (824–905)

- House of Jiménez (905–1234)

- House of Champagne (Blois) (1234–1284)

- House of Capet (1284–1349)

- House of Évreux (1328–1441)

- House of Trastámara (1425–1479)

- House of Foix (1479–1517)

- House of Albret (1484–1572)

- House of Bourbon (1572–1620)

—— The solid lines denote the legitimate descendants

– – – - The dashed lines denote a marriage

· · · · The dotted lines denote the liaisons and illegitimate descendants

Family tree of Navarrese monarchs

Íñigo	?	Musa ibn Fortún bef. 740– c. 788/802
Aznar I d. 839; Count of Aragon r. 809–820	Fortún; Íñiguez d. 843	Íñigo Arista; King of Pamplona c. 790–851/2 r. 824–851/2
Galindo I Aznárez d. 867; Count of Aragon r. 844–867	Matrona	García the Bad d. 833; Count of Aragon r. 820–833	unknown daughter	García I Íñiguez c. 805–882; King of Pamplona r. 851/852–882	Musa ibn Musa; 790–862	Assona; Íñiguez	Galindo d. 870
Aznar II Galíndez d. 893; Count of Aragon r. 867–893	Oneca Garcés of Pamplona b. 838	Auria	Fortún Garcés d. 905; King of Pamplona r. 870–905	Alfonso III the Great c. 848–910; King of Asturias r. 866–910	? Jimena of Pamplona d. 912	Sancho Garcés
Aznar; Fortúnez	García; Jiménez of Pamplona; 835–aft. 885	Velasco; Fortúnez	Lope; Fortúnez	Abdullah ibn Muhammad; 844–912; Emir of Córdoba r. 888–912	Onneca; Fortúnez c. 849–aft. 890	Aznar Sánchez of Larraun; Count of Aragon
Sancha	Galindo; Aznárez II d. 922; Count of Aragon r. 893–922	Sancha Garcés of Pamplona	Íñigo Fortúnez	Íñigo Garcés	Jimena	Jimeno II Garcés d. 931; King of Pamplona r. 925–931	Sancha; Aznárez	Sancho I Garcés c. 860–925; King of Pamplona r. 905–925	Toda; Pamplona; 876–958
Musa Aznar ibn Muhammad of Huesca	Dadildis	García; Jiménez of Pamplona	Sancho; Jiménez of Pamplona	Ordoño II c. 873–924; King of León r. 914–924	Sancha Sánchez of Pamplona	Fernán González c. 910–970; Count of Castile r. 923–970	Velasquita Sánchez
Urraca Sánchez of Pamplona d. betw.959/963	Ramiro II c. 900–951; King of León r. 931–951	Alfonso IV c. 890s–933 King of León r. 925–933	Oneca of Pamplona d. 931	Orbita of Pamplona
Andregoto Galíndez	García Sánchez I c. 919–970; King of Pamplona r. 925–970	Teresa of León
Urraca Garcés d. bef. 1008	Ramiro Garcés d. 981; King of Viguera r. 970–981	Jimeno Garcés	Toda Garcés	Sancho II c. 938–994; King of Pamplona r. 970–994	Urraca; Fernández d. 1007	Ordoño III; 926–956; King of León r. 951–956	Ordoño IV c. 926–963; King of León r. 958–960	García; Fernández of Castile c. 938–995
Urraca Sanchez	Gonzalo of Pamplona	Ramiro Sánchez d. 992	García Sánchez II; King of Pamplona d. c. 1004 r. 994 – c. 1004	Jimena Fernández of Cea	Bermudo II the Gouty; 956–999; King of León r. 984–999	Elvira García c. 978–1017
Elvira Garcés	García Garcés	Mayor of Castile; 995–1066	Sancho III the Great; 990–1035; King of Pamplona r. 1004–1035	Sancha of Aibar c. 995–1070	Urraca Garcés	Alfonso V 994–1028; King of León r. 999–1028
unknown mistress(es)	García Sánchez III; 1016–1054; King of Navarre r. 1035–1054	Stephanie d. aft. 1066	Gonzalo; Count of Sobrarbe and Ribagorza; 1020–1043	Ferdinand I the Great c. 1015–1065; King of León and Castille r. 1037–1065	Sancha of León d. 1067	Jimena Sánchez; 1012–aft. 1062	Bermudo III; 1017–1037; King of León r. 1028–1037	Ermesinda of Bigorre; 1015–1049	Ramiro I King of Aragon bef. 1007–1063 r. 1035–1063
Teresa	Ramiro Garcés; Lord of Calahorra d. 1083	Ferdinand Garcés; Lord of Bucesta d. 1068	Ramon Garcés; Lord of Murillo d. aft. 1079	Jimena d. aft. 1085; Lady of Corcuetos	Isabella of Urgell d. 1071	Sancho V. Ramírez c. 1042–1094; King of Navarre r. 1076–1094	Felicia of Roucy c. 1060–1123	Sancho; Count of Ribagorza bef. 1043–1105/1110
García; Ordóñez d. 1108	Urraca; Lady of Alberite; Lardero and Logroño	Sancho IV of Peñalén c. 1038–1076; King of Navarre r. 1054–1076	Placencia d. aft. 1088	Mayor Garcés; Lady of Yanguas; Atayo and Velilla d. aft. 1115	Alfonso VI; 1040–1109; King of León and Castile r. 1072–1109	Agnes of Aquitaine; 1072–1097	Peter I King of Navarre; 1068/9–1104 r. 1094–1104	Bertha of Aragon c. 1075–bef. 1111	García Sánchez of Atarés
Urraca Sánchez d. aft. 1072	Raimundo Sánchez bef. 1071–1110	García of Pamplona d. aft. 1092	García of Pamplona d. aft. 1092	Pedro of Aragón c. 1086–1104	Inés of Aragón d. 1103
Mencia Garcés d. 1106	Fortún Ochoiz fl. 1013–1050	Sancho Garcés; Lord of Uncastillo c. 1038–1083	Constanza	Rodrigo Díaz; El Cid de Vivar; 1043–1099	Urraca; 1079–1126; Queen of León and Castile r. 1109–1126	Alfonso I the Battler; 1074–1134; King of Navarre r. 1104–1134	Ramiro II; 1086–1157; King of Aragon r. 1134–1157; 1134 pretender	Pedro de Atarés; 1083–1151; 1134 pretender
Fruela Díaz d. 1119	Estefanía Sánchez	Ramiro Sánchez; Lord of Monzón; 1070–1116	Cristina Rodríguez b. bef. 1075	Alfonso VII; 1105–1157; King of León and Castile r. 1126–1157	Berengaria of Barcelona; 1116–1149
Rodrigo Gómez	Elvira Ramírez d. 1164	Urraca the Asturian of Castile; 1133–c. 1179	García Ramírez the Restorer; King of Navarre c. 1112–1134–1150	Margaret of L'Aigle d. 1141
Gaston V Viscount of Béarn d. 1170 r. 1153–1170	Sancha of Navarra	Pedro de Molina d. 1202	William I the Bad; 1131–1166; King of Sicily r. 1154–1166	Margaret of Navarre c. 1135–1183	Sancho VI the Wise; 1132–1194; King of Navarre r. 1150–1194	Sancha of Castile; 1139–1179	Blanche of Navarre aft. 1133–1156	Sancho III c. 1134–1158; King of Castile r. 1157–1158
Richard I the Lionheart; King of England; 1157–1199	Berengaria of Navarre c. 1165/1170–1230	Blanche; Countess of Champagne d. 1229	Theobald III; 1179–1201; Count of Champagne r. 1197–1201	Sancho VII the Strong; 1154–1234; King of Navarre r. 1194–1234	Constance of Toulouse c. 1180–aft. 1260	Fernando d. 1207
Gertrude of Dagsburg d. 1225	Agnes of Beaujeu d. 1231	Theobald I 1201–1253; King of Navarre r. 1234–1253	Margaret of Bourbon c. 1217–1256
Louis IX; 1214–1270; King of France r. 1226–1270	John I the Red; Duke of Brittany; 1217–1237–1286	Blanche of Navarre; 1226–1283	Pedro d. 1265
Philip III; 1245–1285; King of France r. 1270–1285	Isabella of France; 1241–1271	Theobald II the Young c. 1239–1270; King of Navarre r. 1253–1270	Henry I the Fat c. 1244–1274; King of Navarre r. 1270–1274	Blanche of Artois c. 1248–1302	Eleanor b. 1233	Beatrice of Navarre; 1242d. 1295	Hugh IV; 1213–1272; Duke of Burgundy r. 1218–1272	Margarita of Navarra	Frederick III; 1240–1303; Duke of Lorraine r. 1251–1303
Charles; 1270–1325; Count of Valois r. 1284–1325	Louis; 1276–1319; Count of Évreux r. 1303–1319	Philip I (IV); 1268–1314; King of France r. 1285–1314; King of Navarre r. 1284–1305	Joan I 1273–1305; Queen of Navarre r. 1274–1305	Robert II; 1248–1306; Duke of Burgundy r. 1272–1306
Jeanne of Évreux; 1310–1371	Charles I(IV); 1294–1328; King of France and Navarre r. 1322–1328	Margaret of Burgundy; 1290–1315	Louis I (X); 1289–1316; King of France r. 1314–1316; King of Navarre r. 1305–1316	Clementia of Hungary; 1293–1328	Joan II; Countess of Burgundy; 1292–1330	Philip II (V); King of France and Navarre c. 1292– 1316–1322	Isabella of France; 1295–1358
Philip VI; 1293–1350; King of France r. 1328–1350	Philip III; 1306–1343; King of Navarre r. 1328–1343	Joan II; 1312–1349; Queen of Navarre r. 1328–1349	John I the Posthumous; King of France and Navarre r. 1316	Guigues VIII; 1309–1333; Dauphin of Vienne r. 1318–1333	Isabella; Dauphine of Viennois c. 1312–1348	Joan III; 1308–1349; Countess of Burgundy r. 1330–1349	Odo IV; 1295–1350; Duke of Burgundy r. 1315–1350
John II; 1319–1364; King of France r. 1350–1364	Blanche of Navarre; 1330–1398	Maria of Navarre; 1329–1347	Peter IV; 1319–1387; King of Aragon r. 1336–1387	Joanna c. 1326–1387	Philip; Count of Longueville; 1336–1363	Yolande of Flanders; 1326–1395	Blanche of France; 1313–1358	Margaret I 1310–1382; Countess of Burgundy r. 1361–1382	Louis I 1304–1346; Count of Flanders r. 1322–1346
Joan of Valois; 1343–1373	Charles II the Bad; 1332–1387; King of Navarre r. 1349–1387	Agnes; 1334–1396	Gaston III; 1331–1391; Count of Foix r. 1343–1391	Maria of Lizarazu	Louis of Évreux; 1341–1376	Joanna; Duchess of Durazzo; 1344–1387	Joanna aft. 1342–1403	John I Viscount of Rohan; 1324–1396
Bonne; 1364–aft.1389	Marie; 1360–aft.1400	Alfonso d'Aragona; Duke of Gandia d. 1412	Charles III the Noble; 1361–1425; King of Navarre r. 1387–1425	Eleanor of Castile aft.1363–1416	Philip b. 1368	John IV; Duke of Brittany; 1339–1399	Joan of Navarre; 1370–1437	Henry IV; 1367–1413; King of England r. 1399–1413	Blanche; 1372–1385
John II the Great; 1398–1479; King of Navarre r. 1425–1479	Blanche I 1387–1441; Queen of Navarre r. 1425–1441	Martin I c. 1375–1409; King of Sicily r. 1390–1409	Isabella of Navarre; 1395–1450	John IV; 1396–1450; Count of Armagnac r. 1418–1450	Joan; Heiress of Navarre; 1382–1413	John I Count of Foix; 1382–1436	Beatrice of Navarre; 1392–1412/15	James II; Count of La Marche; 1370–1438
Isabella I 1451–1504; Queen of Castile r. 1474–1504	Ferdinand II of Aragon; 1452–1516; King of Castile r. 1475–1504	Charles (IV); 1421–1461; King of Navarre r. 1441–1461 de jure	Agnes of Cleves; 1422–1448	Blanche II; 1424–1464; Queen of Navarre r. 1461–1464 de jure	Henry IV; 1425–1474; King of Castile and León r. 1454–1474	Eleanor; 1426–1479; Queen of Navarre r. 1479	Gaston IV; 1422–1472; Count of Foix r. 1436–1472
Kings of Spain also Kings of Spanish Navarre	Marie of Orléans; 1457–1493	John; Viscount of Narbonne; 1450–1500	Pierre of Foix; 1449–1490	Marie of Foix; 1452–1467	William VIII, Marquess of Montferrat; 1420–1483 r. 1464–1483	Margaret of Foix c. 1449–1486	Francis II; 1433–1488; Duke of Brittany r. 1458–1488	Joan of Foix; 1454–1476
Germaine of Foix; 1488–1538	Catherine of Beaumont	Jacques of Foix; 1455–1500	Gaston; Prince of Viana; 1444–1470	Magdalena of France; 1443–1495	Catherine of Foix; 1455–1494	Gaston; Earl of Kendal; 1448–1500
Charles; 1459–1496; Count of Angoulême r. 1467–1496	John III; 1469–1516; King of Navarre r. 1484–1516 jure uxoris	Catherine; 1468–1517; Queen of Navarre r. 1483–1517	Francis; Phoebus; 1469–1483; King of Navarre r. 1479–1483
Anne of Navarre; 1492–1532	Magdalena of Navarre; 1494–1504	Catherine; Abbess of the Trinity at Caen; 1495–1532	Joan of Navarre; 1496–bef. 1496	Andrew; Phoebus of Navarre; 1501–1503	Buenaventura of Navarre; 1505–c. 1510	Martin of Navarre c. 1506–bef. 1512	Francis of Navarre; 1508–bef. 1512	Charles of Navarre; 1510–1528
Francis I 1494–1547; King of France r. 1515–1547	Marguerite of Angoulême; 1492–1549	Henry II; 1503–1555; King of Navarre r. 1517–1555	Isabella of Navarre; 1512–1555	René I Viscount of Rohan; 1516–1552	Quiteria; Abbess at Montivilliers; 1499–1536
Henry II; 1519–1559; King of France r. 1547–1559	Antoine of Bourbon; 1518–1562; King of Navarre r. 1555–1562 jure uxoris	Jeanne III d'Albret; 1528–1572; Queen of Navarre r. 1555–1572	William; 1516–1592; Duke of Jülich-Cleves-Berg r. 1539–1592	John; 1530
Henry; Duke of Beaumont; 1551–1553	Margaret of France; 1553–1615	Henry III (IV); 1553–1610; King of Navarre r. 1572–1610; King of France r. 1589–1610	Marie de' Medici; 1575–1642	Madeleine de Bourbon; 1556	Louis-Charles; Count of Marle; 1555–1557	Catherine de Bourbon; 1559–1604	Henry II; 1563–1624; Duke of Lorraine r. 1608–1624
Kings of France also Kings of French Navarre

== Image ==
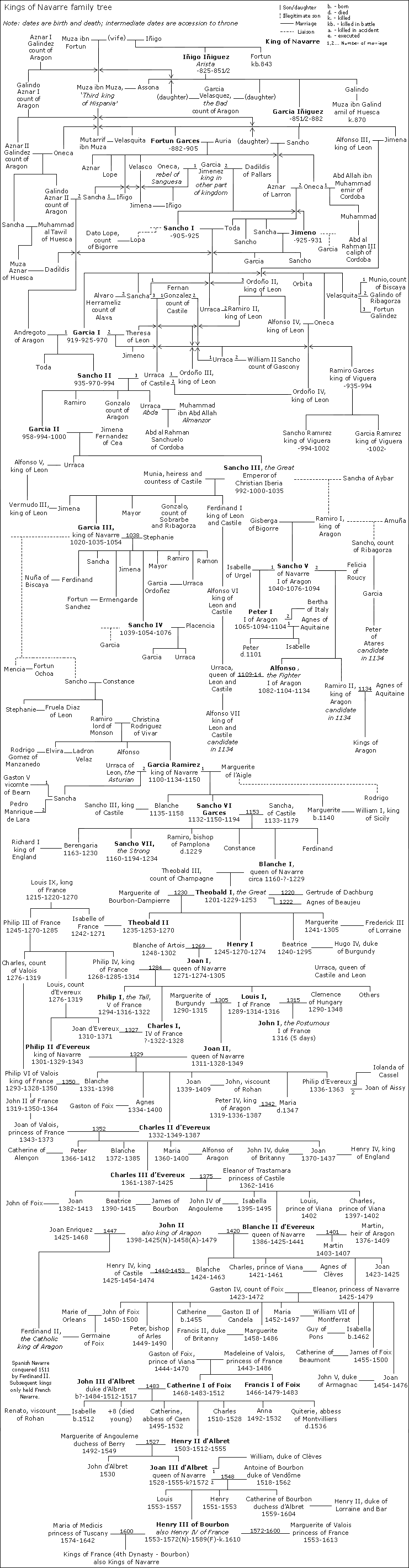

== See also ==
- List of Navarrese monarchs
- Kingdom of Navarre
- Kingdom of Pamplona
