= García Sánchez I of Pamplona =

King of Pamplona from 925 to 970

García Sánchez I

King of Pamplona
- Reign: 925–970
- Predecessor: Sancho I
- Successor: Sancho II

King of the Kingdom of Najera
- Reign: 923–970
- Predecessor: Title created
- Successor: Sancho II of Pamplona
- Born: c. 919
- Died: 970
- Burial: Castle of San Esteban Deio, Villamayor de Monjardín
- Consort: Andregoto Galíndez; Teresa Ramírez
- Issue: Sancho II of Pamplona; Ramiro I of Viguera; Toda Garcés; Jimeno Garcés; Urraca, Countess of Castile
- House: House of Jiménez
- Father: Sancho I
- Mother: Toda Aznárez

García Sánchez I (Basque: Gartzea I.a Santxez; c. 919 (Note: The Anales de Pamplona of the Códice de Roda indicate that he was aged 12 at the time he became king. This is usually taken to reflect a birth in 919 and succession on the death of his uncle in 931. However, the Initium regnum Pampilonam, an eleventh-century addition to the same codex, says that at the time of his death in February 970 he had ruled for 35 years, apparently using his mother's 934 displacement as regent for the starting date. If this is the date used by the Anales it would instead place his birth about 922.) – 22 February 970), was the king of Pamplona from 925 until his death in 970. He was the second king of the Jiménez dynasty, succeeding his father when he was merely six years old.

== Biography ==
Son of Sancho I and Toda Aznárez, he succeeded his father in 925 when he was only six years old and reigned under the tutelage of his uncle Jimeno Garcés (Note: Upon the death of his father, his ayo and tutor, Jimeno Garcés, was entrusted with the governance of the kingdom. According to Gonzalo Martínez Díez, even though Jimeno sometimes appears with the title of king or prince, he governed on behalf of his nephew and there are no records of any problems or discrepancies in his relations with García.) and of his mother, Toda. Three of García's sisters married kings of León: Urraca married Ramiro II; Oneca was the wife of Alfonso IV; and Sancha Sánchez was first married to Ordoño II. After Ordoño's death, she became the wife of Álvaro Herraméliz, Count of Álava, and after his death married Fernán González, Count of Castile. Another sister, Velasquita, married Munio Vélaz, who was Álvaro Herraméliz's predecessor as count of Álava. According to historian Gonzalo Martínez Díez, "the intimate family ties of the Navarrese dynasty with the monarchs of León and with the counts of Castile and Álava, would be reflected in the battlefield where soldiers from Pamplona frequently fought side by side with the Leonese and Castilians against a common enemy, Islam". Thanks to this web of alliances crafted by Queen Toda, Pamplona was able to increase its power and play a key role in the affairs of the Christian kingdoms of the Iberian Peninsula.

Upon the death of his uncle and tutor, Jimeno Garcés, on 29 May 931, another uncle, Íñigo Garcés, half-brother of García's father, Sancho I, probably tried to become the regent of the kingdom and perhaps even usurp the throne, to the detriment of his nephew's rights. Both García and his mother Toda appear in a charter at the Abbey of San Pedro de Siresa on 9 March 933 without the royal titles. (Note: The charter, where he confirms several donations that he had made as well as those of counts Galindo, Aznar, and another Galindo, is signed by Garsea Sanzonis and Tota Isenari.) A year later, in May 934, the Caliph of Córdoba, Abd-ar-Rahman III, led a military expedition against King Ramiro II of León. The Caliph's original intention was to penetrate Castile, but he changed his plans when the Tujibid governor of Zaragoza, Muhammad ibn Hashim, refused to join forces. His armies first attacked the fortress in Maluenda and then ibn Hashim's fortress in Rueda de Jalón. When Abd-ar-Rahman was about to penetrate the Kingdom of Pamplona, he received an embassy from Toda asking him to withdraw his troops, and also reminding him of the family ties that bound them. (Note: Toda was Abd-ar-Rahman's aunt as the half-sister of the caliph's father.) The objective of Toda's embassy to her nephew Abd-ar-Rahman III could also have been to seek his protection for herself and her son and to have the Caliph "expressly recognize her son, the young monarch García Sánchez I". This would have secured García the crown in the face of possible counterclaimants (such as Íñigo Garcés).

Abd-ar-Rahman, who had never met his aunt, imposed the condition that she was to meet him at his camp in Calahorra "as proof of the sincerity of her motives". She accepted and went to meet him. As described by historian Ibn Hayyan, as part of the "pact of submission and vassalage", she was to submit to him and detach herself from the other Christian rulers, allies, and relatives, desist from supporting them, and do nothing to hurt the Muslims. She was also to allow free passage to his armies through the Kingdom of Pamplona and had to liberate the Muslim hostages that she had as a pledge for a payment due to her. She consented to all of his demands and he, in turn, gave her son, García, Pamplona and all of its districts in investiture. She left on the same day taking with her the rich presents that he had given her. Shortly afterwards, the Muslim armies rapidly crossed the territory under the Pamplonese monarchy so as not to cause damage, and attacked the neighboring Álava and Castile, attacking the fortress in Grañón. They burned crops, chopped down fruit trees, and destroyed vineyards and buildings along the way. (Note: "Queen Toda. with her submission to the caliph, had purchased his support for her and her son's throne and, at the same time, had saved the Kingdom of Pamplona from the hurricane that was about to land, giving him free passage through her land and diverting it towards the lands of her son-in-law Fernán González, whose first fortress facing La Rioja at that time, since 923, under the sovereignty of Pamplona was Grañón. An intelligent political play although not precisely generous or based on solidarity, but sometimes the need and the yearning for survival become law". (translation))

In 937, King García allied himself with Ramiro II of León and Muhammad ibn Hashim, governor of Zaragoza, resulting in a military campaign by Abd-ar-Rahman III via Calatayud and Zaragoza into García's lands. He participated in July 939 in the Battle of Simancas alongside Ramiro II and Fernán González with the Christian armies defeating the caliphal forces. After this reversal, Abd-ar-Rahman III was planning another expedition for March 940 but suspended all plans when he received a messenger from Ramiro II to negotiate a truce. The Caliph, in response, also sent an envoy to the Leonese court for the negotiations. At about the same time or sometime before, he had also begun talks with Sunyer, Count of Barcelona, the result of which was a two-year truce. The accord, very advantageous for the Christians in commercial terms, included several conditions, one of which was the cancellation of the plans (or the annulment) of the marriage of King García with Count Sunyer's daughter. (Note: Martínez Díez, referring to Al-Nuqtabis by Ibn Hayyan (Vol. V, translation by Viguera-Corriente, pp. 341–342) says that the Count of Barcelona had given his daughter to García in marriage but that the marriage was cancelled to comply with the terms of the truce.) The peace negotiations between King Ramiro II and Abd-ar-Rahman III were not concluded until the summer of 941. The peace included "all the frontier communities between the kingdoms of Leon and Pamplona, from Santarém to Huesca since Ramiro had a great interest in including García Sánchez I, the king who governed the destinies of the Pyrenean kingdom, rather than leaving him in the hands of Abd-ar-Rahman as the only Christian ruler remaining in a state of war with the Cordoban caliphate".

Following the death of Ramiro II and his successor Ordoño III of León, the Pamplona kingdom threw support behind the deceased king's younger brother, Sancho I of León, who was García's nephew. When García's brother-in-law, later also his son-in-law, and ally Fernán González of Castile switched his support and installed his own son-in-law Ordoño IV of León in place of Sancho, Fernán's relationship with García became strained and the death of Fernán's wife, García's sister Sancha, the next year led to a break. García directly intervened in León, capturing Fernán and restoring Sancho. Fernán was forced to make territorial concessions to García to gain his release and their alliance wasn't fully restored until 964, when Fernán remarried, this time to García's daughter Urraca.

He died on 22 February 970 and was interred in the castle of San Esteban de Deyo in Villamayor de Monjardín, Navarre.

== Marriages and children ==
García married his first cousin Andregoto Galíndez, daughter of Galindo Aznárez II, Count of Aragon and his wife Sancha Garcés. (Note: Sancho I of Pamplona, García's father, was a half-brother of Andregoto's mother, Sancha Garcés, both being the children of García Jiménez of Pamplona; Sancho I of his second wife, Dadildis of Pallars, and Sancha of his first wife, Onneca Rebelle of Sangüesa.) Given that Galindo Aznárez II did not have any legitimate male heirs, the rights to the County of Aragon passed down to Andregoto, and then to her first son with García Sánchez, as a county within the Kingdom of Pamplona. (Note: "...both territories, Pamplona and Aragon, [were united] in the Jimena dynasty, although the Aragonese county at all times maintained its own personality as an autonomous territory within the monarchy of Pamplona". (translation))

The following children were born of this marriage:

- Sancho II of Pamplona, King of Pamplona and Count of Aragon until his death in 994. He was married to his first cousin, Urraca Fernández, daughter of Fernán González of Castile, Count of Castile and his wife Sancha Sánchez, who was Sancho's paternal aunt.
- Toda Garcés (Note: On 15 February 991, King Sancho II with his sister Toda donated the Monastery of Bayacoa as well as a vineyard in the valley of Ibargoiti to the Monastery of Leyre.)

Andregoto was repudiated by her husband in 942. She retired to her lands in Aibar where she died sometime after June 971. (Note: On 29 June 971, Andregoto with her son Sancho and his wife Urraca Fernández donated the village of Javierre de Martes with all of its dominions to the Abbey of San Pedro de Siresa.)

The King had reached an agreement to marry the daughter of Sunyer, Count of Barcelona, but the forced submission of Sunyer to Abd-ar-Rahman included the abandonment of this plan. By 943, García had married Teresa Ramírez, (Note: They appear together for the first time in 943 in a charter in the Monastery of San Millán de Suso.) daughter of his ally Ramiro II of León and Adosinda Gutiérrez. They had the following children:

- Ramiro Garcés of Viguera (died 981), first King of Viguera.
- Jimeno Garcés (Note: On 15 February 978, King Sancho, and his wife Urraca, together with the infantes Ramiro and Jimeno, named as germanis nostris (our siblings), confirmed to the Abbey of San Pedro de Siresa a donation made by genitor noster Garsea rex (our father, King García). In the same year, he was present at the founding of the Infantado of Covarrubias by Count García Fernández in favor of his daughter Urraca, signing the foundational charter: Sancio rex, confirmans; Urraca regina confirmans; rege Scemeno confirmans. The term "rege" should not be construed as "king" since this title was often used in the Kingdom of Pamplona by the children of monarchs.)
- Urraca Garcés (died before 1008), (Note: Her son Bernard in 1008 mentions his mother, already deceased.) was the second wife of Fernán González, Count of Castile, and, after his death, married to count William Sánchez of Gascony. (Note: Urraca is commonly given as daughter by García's second wife. Gonzalo Martínez Díez in Sancho III el Mayor: rey de Pamplona, Rex Ibericus makes her daughter of Andregoto, while giving García a second daughter of the same name by Teresa. Traditional chronology militates against this reconstruction, as the widow of Fernán González is typically identified with the Urraca, duchess of Gascony, who died in 1041. However, while still showing Urraca as daughter of Teresa, Jaime de Salazar y Acha shows her death to have been by 1008, concluding that the 1041 decedent was instead her niece and daughter-in-law Urraca Sánchez, daughter of Sancho García of Castile and widow of Sancho VI William of Gascony. While this would thereby allow the Martínez Díez reconstruction, Urraca's marriage to Fernán González between 961 and 964, more than two decades after Andregoto's divorce, still makes Teresa more likely to have been her mother.)

== Ancestry ==
Ancestors of García Sánchez I of Pamplona

8. Jimeno of Pamplona
4. García Jiménez of Pamplona
2. Sancho I Garcés, King of Pamplona
10. Lope
5. Dadildis of Pallars-Ribagorza
1. García Sánchez I of Pamplona
24. García Íñiguez, King of Pamplona (= #28)
12. Sancho Garcés
6. Aznar Sánchez de Larraún
3. Toda Aznárez
28. García Íñiguez, King of Pamplona (= #24)
14. Fortún Garcés, King of Pamplona
7. Onneca Fortúnez
15. Oria

== Bibliography ==
=== Secondary sources ===
- Cañada Juste, Alberto (1981). "Un milenario navarro: Ramiro Garcés, rey de Viguera" (PDF). Príncipe de Viana (in Spanish) (Year 42, Num. 162): 21–37. ISSN 0032-8472.
- Lacarra de Miguel, José María (1945). "Textos navarros del Códice de Roda" (PDF). Estudios de Edad Media de la Corona de Aragón (in Spanish). 1: 193–284. OCLC 694519776. Archived from the original (PDF) on 3 March 2016.
- Martín Duque, Ángel J. (2002). "Vasconia en la alta edad media: somera aproximación histórica". Príncipe de Viana (in Spanish). 63 (227). Pamplona: Gobierno de Navarra: Institución Príncipe de Viana: 871–908. ISSN 0032-8472.
- Martínez Díez, Gonzalo (2005). El Condado de Castilla (711-1038): la historia frente a la leyenda (in Spanish). 2 volumes. Valladolid. ISBN 84-9718-275-8.
- Martínez Díez, Gonzalo (2007). Sancho III el Mayor Rey de Pamplona, Rex Ibericus (in Spanish). Madrid: Marcial Pons Historia. ISBN 978-84-96467-47-7.
- Salas Merino, Vicente (2008). La genealogía de los reyes de España (in Spanish) (4th ed.). Madrid: Visión Libros. ISBN 978-84-9821-767-4.
- Salazar y Acha, Jaime de (2006). "Urraca. Un nombre egregio en la onomástica altomedieval". En la España medieval (in Spanish) (1): 29–48. ISSN 0214-3038.
- Ubieto Arteta, Antonio (1963). Los reyes pamploneses entre 905 y 970 (in Spanish). Pamplona: Gobierno de Navarra: Institución Príncipe de Viana. pp. 77–82. ISSN 0032-8472.

=== Primary sources ===
- Martín Duque, Ángel J. (1983). Documentación medieval de Leire (Siglos IX a XII) (in Spanish). Pamplona: Diputación Foral de Navarra, Institución Príncipe de Viana. ISBN 8423506258.
- Ubieto Arteta, Antonio (1976). Cartulario de San Millán de la Cogolla (759-1076) (in Spanish). Zaragoza: Anubar Ediciones. ISBN 84-7013-082-X.
- Ubieto Arteta, Antonio (1986). Cartulario de Siresa (in Spanish). Zaragoza: Anubar Ediciones. ISBN 84-7013-217-2.

Regnal titles
| Preceded by Sancho I | King of Pamplona; 925–970 | Succeeded by Sancho II |
