= Onneca Fortúnez =

9th-century Basque princess from the Kingdom of Pamplona

Onneca / Iñiga
- Infanta of Pamplona
- Born: 848/850
- Died: aft. 890
- Spouse: Abdullah of Córdoba (m. 862/863); Aznar Sánchez de Laron (m. 882/883)
- Issue: Muhammad al-Baha'; Fatima the Younger; Sancho; Toda, Queen of Pamplona; Sancha Aznárez, Queen of Pamplona
Names
- Birth name: Onneca / Iñiga; Arabic name: Durr (در)
- House: House of Íñiguez
- Father: Fortún Garcés of Pamplona
- Mother: Auria

Onneca Fortúnez or Iñiga Fortúnez (c. 848 – after 890) was a Basque princess from the Kingdom of Pamplona, later known as the Kingdom of Navarre. She was the daughter of Fortún Garcés of Pamplona and his wife Auria. At the time of Onneca's birth, which occurred between 848 and 850, the Iberian Peninsula was largely under the domination of the Muslim Umayyad dynasty. Only the northern kingdoms of Asturias, Pamplona and the Pyrenean threshold remained under control of Roman Catholic rulers. Onneca was a member of the Íñiguez dynasty, named after her great-grandfather Íñigo Arista, who founded the Kingdom of Pamplona.

Information about Onneca's life is limited. Biographical details about her come from two main sources: the Códice de Roda and the accounts of Muslim Andalusi historians, who refer to the grandmother of Abd al-Rahman III by the Arabic name Durr (در), meaning "pearl". Her marriage created family ties between the Roman Catholic and Muslim ruling families of the Iberian peninsula, initially leading to close collaboration between the Catholic House of Íñiguez and the Muslim Umayyads. The political effects resulting from Onneca's marriages continued to be felt long after her death, which occurred at an unknown date.

== Marriage to Emir Abdullah ==
The Iberian peninsula in the early 10th century: Emirate of Córdoba Kingdom of Asturias Kingdom of Pamplona Territories of the Banu Qasi

Onneca's father Fortún Garcés, the then heir to the throne of Pamplona, was captured in 860 in the town of Milagro during a punitive expedition led by Muhammad I, the Muslim emir of Córdoba, against the small Kingdom of Pamplona. The expedition resulted in the devastation of the Roman Catholic kingdom's territory and the seizure of three castles by the Muslim forces. Fortun Garcés, nicknamed al-Anqar (الأنقر) by the Muslims because he was one-eyed, was taken to Córdoba where he was detained for two decades in gilded captivity. It is not known when or how his daughter Onneca came to Córdoba, whether she was captured with him or sent to join him at the emir's court at a later date, but she there was wedded to Muhammad I's son Abdullah around 862/863. Onneca was presumably still a teenager when she bore Abdullah a son named Muhammad in 864. As Abdullah's wife, Onneca became known as Durr. According to some sources, she converted to Islam.

In addition to Muhammad, Onneca bore Abdullah two daughters: al-Baha' and Fatima the Younger. Abdullah became emir in 888, and Onneca's son Muhammad was named heir to the throne. However, Muhammad was assassinated by his younger half-brother al-Mutarrif on 28 January 891. There is disagreement among historians as to whether al-Mutarrif acted on his own or at the instigation of his father Abdullah. Al-Mutarrif himself was beheaded in 895 under orders of his father. As a result, Muhammad's son Abd-ar-Rahman, who was born three weeks prior to his father's assassination, was the one who succeeded his grandfather Abdullah as emir of Córdoba. Known in the West as Abd-ar-Rahman III, he later elevated himself to the position of caliph.

Onneca was thus the paternal grandmother of Abd-ar-Rahman III, who inherited from her as well as from his mother Muzna hailing from the Pyrenees (probably a Basque) European facial features such as blue eyes and light reddish hair that he attempted to alter (notably through hair coloring) in order to look more typically Arab.

== Problematic chronology of marriage Aznar Sánchez de Laron ==
The Códice de Roda, the sole source for Onneca's Catholic marriage, places this union with her cousin Aznar Sánchez de Laron before her marriage, as a widow, to Abdullah of Córdoba. Based on this, French historian Évariste Lévi-Provençal developed a chronology for Onneca's life that placed her birth date around 835. Lévi-Provençal believed that Onneca did not accompany her father when he returned to Pamplona in 882, either because she had already died, or because she had converted to Islam and chose to remain in Abdullah's harem. However, such a chronology is problematic since it implies that Onneca's children by Aznar were born before or only shortly after her father's capture in 860, thus making Onneca's daughter Toda Aznárez a sexagenarian at the time of her son García Sánchez I's birth (which is known to have occurred in either 919 or 922), and nearly a centenarian at the time of her 958 visit to Cordoba. Therefore, most historians addressing the question have concluded that the Códice de Roda was in error with regard to the order of Onneca's two marriages, that she indeed returned to Pamplona with her father and only at that time married Aznar Sánchez. This would allow her birth to have come a decade later, and that of her daughter to be pushed back at least two decades.

Following this modified timeline, in about 880, after two decades in Córdoba, Onneca would have abandoned her Muslim family, and returned with her father to Pamplona, to which he would shortly succeed, and shortly after married Aznar Sánchez, having together a son and two daughters probably born between 880 and 890: Sancho, Toda and Sancha. Their son Sancho Aznar is only known from the Códice de Roda genealogy and he may have died young. Their daughters Toda and Sancha would both become queens of Pamplona by marrying into the Jiménez dynasty, which came to power in 905 after displacing Onneca's father Fortún Garcés from the throne. Toda married Sancho I Garcés, thus uniting the royal houses of Íñiguez and Jiménez. Toda's sister Sancha was wedded to Sancho I Garcés' brother and successor Jimeno Garcés, and was later killed in France by her son García Jiménez.

In a more substantive departure from the Roda genealogy, historian Alberto Cañada Juste concludes that the chronological challenges are overwhelming. Rather than simply shifting the order of Onneca's marriages, he posits that the identity of the Catholic princess who went to Córdoba has been confused by the Roda source between two Pamplona princess in successive generations who both married men named Aznar. Rather than it being Onneca Fortúnez, widow of Aznar Sánchez of Laron, he suggests that the Pamplona woman who went to Córdoba was actually her paternal aunt, Onneca Garcés, sometime wife of Aznar Galíndez II, Count of Aragon.

== Legacy ==
Onneca's historical importance stems from the fact that she provided an important genealogical link between the Muslim caliphs of Córdoba and the Catholic kings of Pamplona, as well as between the first two royal dynasties of Pamplona.

== Family tree ==
The following family tree shows the relationship between Onneca and her immediate relatives. Solid lines indicate descent, while horizontal dashed lines indicate marriage. The names of the three dynasties to which Onneca was directly related are in big capital letters: the Íñiguez dynasty into which she was born and married, the Umayyad dynasty into which she married, and the Jiménez dynasty into which her two Catholic daughters married.

Family tree of Onneca Fortúnez

ÍÑIGUEZ DYNASTY (PAMPLONA)
Íñigo Arista; 1st King of Pamplona (great-grandfather)
García Íñiguez; 2nd King of Pamplona (paternal grandfather)
UMAYYAD DYNASTY (CÓRDOBA)
Muhammad I Emir of Córdoba (father-in-law)	Auria (mother)	Fortún Garcés; 3rd King of Pamplona (father)	Sancho Garcés (paternal uncle & father-in-law)	Onneca Garcès (paternal aunt)	Aznar Galíndez II; Count of Aragon
Abdullah; Emir of Córdoba (1st husband)	Onneca (Durr)	Aznar Sánchez de Laron (2nd husband & first cousin)
JIMÉNEZ DYNASTY (PAMPLONA)
García Jiménez; Sub-King in Pamplona
Muhammad (son)	al-Baha' (daughter)	Fatima the Younger (daughter)	Sancho (son)	Toda (daughter)	Sancho I Garcés; 4th King of Pamplona (son-in-law)	Jimeno Garcés; 5th King of Pamplona (son-in-law)	Sancha (daughter)
Abd al-Rahman III; Caliph of Córdoba (grandson)	Onneca (granddaughter)	Sancha (granddaughter)	Urraca (granddaughter)	Velasquita (granddaughter)	Orbita (granddaughter)	García Sánchez I 6th King of Pamplona (grandson)	García (grandson)	Sancho (grandson)	Dadildis (granddaughter)

== See also ==
- Family tree of Navarrese monarchs
- List of Navarrese consorts
- List of Navarrese monarchs

== Sources ==
- Barrucand, Marianne; Bednorz, Achim (1999). Moorish Architecture. Architecture & Design Series. New York: Taschen. ISBN 978-3-8228-7634-3.
- Cañada Juste, Arturo (2013). "Doña Onneca, una princesa vascona en la corte de los emires cordobeses". Príncipe de Viana (in Spanish). 74 (258): 481–502. ISSN 0032-8472.
- Faro Carballa, José Antonio; García-Barberena Unzu, María; Unzu Urmeneta, Mercedes (2007). "La presencia islámica en Pamplona" [Islamic presence in Pamplona]. In Sénac, Philippe (ed.). Villes et campagnes de Tarraconaise et d'al-Andalus (VIe–XIe siècles): la transition [Cities and countryside in Tarraconensis and al-Andalus (6th–11th centuries): the transition]. Collection "Méridiennes" (in Spanish). Toulouse: CNRS – Université de Toulouse – Le Mirail. pp. 97–139. ISBN 978-2-912025-23-4.
- Fletcher, Richard (2006) [First published 1992]. Moorish Spain (2nd ed.). Berkeley, CA: University of California Press. ISBN 978-0-520-24840-3.
- Goyhenetche, Manex (1998). Histoire générale du Pays Basque [General History of the Basque Country] (in French). Vol. Tome I: Préhistoire, Époque romaine, Moyen Âge (2nd ed.). Donostia-San Sebastián: Elkarlanean. ISBN 978-84-8331-401-2.
- Jayyusi, Salma Khadra, ed. (1992). The Legacy of Muslim Spain. Handbuch der Orientalistik. Vol. Part 1, Volume 12. Leiden: E.J. Brill. ISBN 978-90-04-09599-1.
- Lévi-Provençal, Évariste (1953). "Du nouveau sur le royaume de Pampelune au IXe siècle" [New information about the Kingdom of Pamplona in the 9th century]. Bulletin Hispanique (in French). 55 (1): 5–22. doi:10.3406/hispa.1953.3340. ISSN 0007-4640.
- Lévi-Provençal, Évariste (1999) [First published 1950]. Histoire de l'Espagne musulmane [History of Muslim Spain] (in French). Vol. Tome 1: La conquête et l'émirat hispano-umaiyade. Paris: Maisonneuve & Larose. ISBN 978-2-7068-1386-3.
- Martínez Díez, Gonzalo (2005). El Condado de Castilla (711–1038): la historia frente a la leyenda [The County of Castile (711–1038): History vs. Legend]. Estudios de historia (in Spanish). Vol. I. Valladolid: Marcial Pons Historia. ISBN 978-84-95379-94-8.
- Salas Merino, Vicente (2008). La Genealogía de Los Reyes de España [The Genealogy of the Kings of Spain] (in Spanish) (4th ed.). Madrid: Editorial Visión Libros. ISBN 978-84-9821-767-4.
- Stasser, Thierry (November–December 1999). "Consanguinité et alliances dynastiques en Espagne au Haut Moyen Âge: La politique matrimoniale de la reine Tota de Navarre" [Consanguinity and dynastic alliances in Spain during the Early Middle Ages: The matrimonial policy of Toda of Navarre]. Revista Hidalguía (in French) (277). Madrid: Ediciones Hidalguía: 811–840. ISSN 0018-1285.
- Suárez Fernández, Luis (1976). Historia de España antigua y media [History of Ancient and Medieval Spain] (in Spanish). Madrid: Ediciones Rialp. ISBN 978-84-321-1882-1.
- Traggia, Joaquín (1805). "Discurso histórico sobre el orígen y succesion del reyno pirenaico hasta Don Sancho el Mayor" [Historical discourse on the origin and succession of the Pyrenean kingdom up to Sancho the Great]. In Real Academia de la Historia (ed.). Memorias de la Real Academia de la Historia (Discourse read on 1 February 1799 at a regular meeting of the Royal Academy of History) (in Spanish). Vol. IV. Madrid: Imprenta de Sancha. OCLC 504416291.
- Ubieto Arteta, Antonio (1963). "Los reyes pamploneses entre 905 y 970" [The kings of Pamplona between 905 and 970]. Príncipe de Viana (in Spanish). 24 (90–91). Pamplona: Departamento de Cultura y Turismo: 77–82. ISSN 0032-8472.
- Vallvé Bermejo, Joaquín (1999). Al-Andalus: sociedad e instituciones [Al-Andalus: Society and Institutions]. Volume 20 of Clave historial (in Spanish). Madrid: Real Academia de la Historia. ISBN 978-84-89512-16-0.
