= Jiménez dynasty =

Medieval royal dynasty in the Iberian Peninsula

Jiménez
- Country: Kingdom of Navarre (Kingdom of Pamplona) (control lost in 1234; 792 years ago); Kingdom of Aragon (control lost in 1164; 862 years ago); Kingdom of Castile (control lost in 1126; 900 years ago); Kingdom of León (control lost in 1126; 900 years ago); Kingdom of Galicia (control lost in 1126; 900 years ago)
- Founded: 835; 1191 years ago
- Founder: Prince García Jiménez of Pamplona
- Current head: Extinct
- Final ruler: Sancho VII
- Titles: Emperor of all Spain; King of Leon; King of Castile; King of Galicia; King of Aragon; King of Pamplona; King of Navarre; King of Viguera; Queen Consort of England; Queen Consort of Sicily; Count of Aragon; Count of the Principate; Count of Montescaglioso; Countess of Champagne
- Dissolution: 1234; 792 years ago

The Jiménez dynasty, alternatively called the Jimena, the Sancha, the Banu Sancho, the Abarca or the Banu Abarca, was a medieval ruling family which, beginning in the 9th century, eventually grew to control the royal houses of several kingdoms on the Iberian Peninsula during the 11th and 12th centuries, namely the Kingdoms of Navarre, Aragon, Castile, León and Galicia as well as of other territories in Southern France. The family played a major role in the Reconquista, expanding the territory under the direct control of the Christian states as well as subjecting neighboring Muslim taifas to vassalage. Each of the Jiménez royal lines ultimately went extinct in the male line in the 12th or 13th century.

== History ==
The first known member of the family, García Jiménez of Pamplona, is obscure, it being stated by the Códice de Roda that he was "king of another part of the kingdom" of Pamplona, presumably lord of part of Navarre beyond the area of direct control of the Íñiguez kings: probably the frontier areas of Álava and the western Pyrenees given the list of their landholdings preserved in a later charter. It was long believed that their origins lay in Gascony.

In 905 Sancho Garcés, a younger son of the dynasty founder, used foreign assistance to displace the Íñiguez ruler Fortún Garcés and consolidate the monarchy in his dynasty's hands. He would be viewed as founder of the dynasty, with several Iberian Muslim sources calling the family the Banu Sanjo (Arabic: بنو شانجه – the descendants of Sancho) for several subsequent generations, while a 12th-century Tunisian chronicler of Al-Andalus, Ibn al-Kardabūs, referred to Sancho III of Pamplona as ibn Abarca (Arabic: بن أبرك – son or descendant of Abarca), referencing a nickname originally borne by Sancho I in the naming of this Banu Abarca dynasty. In addition to repulsing several attacks from the Emir of Córdoba, Sancho I crushed the neighboring Banu Qasi and thus expanded Pamplona to the upper Ebro River valley, as well as incorporating the previously-autonomous County of Aragon into the realm.

Following the death of Sancho in 925, his brother Jimeno Garcés maintained a position of strength, intervening in the politics of neighboring Christian and Muslim states. His death left the crown to his nephew, Sancho's son García Sánchez I, who was still a child. He was left under the tutelage of his mother, the Íñiguez descendant Toda Aznárez of Pamplona (Basque: Tota Aznar), who established a web of political and marital alliances among the Iberian Christian states; in 934 Toda signed a treaty pledging allegiance to her nephew Abd-ar-Rahman III, and released hostages of the Banu Di n-Nun clan, the caliph confirming the rule of her son García (this has sometimes been interpreted as an act of the Caliph to liberate García from his mother's direct control). Thereupon followed three generations of defeat and subjugation by the Caliphate. For his younger son, García created a short-lived sub-kingdom centered at Viguera, which lasted for several decades until its reabsorption into the Kingdom of Pamplona.

The latter only emancipated itself from Cordoban suzerainty during the reign of Sancho the Great, who ruled from 1000 to 1035 in Pamplona, but also ruled Aragon, Castile, Ribagorza and eventually León (but not Galicia) by right of conquest. He received the homage of the Count of Barcelona and possibly of the Duke of Gascony. After his coronation in León, he even took up the imperial title over all Spain. His vast domains were divided amongst his sons at his death, giving rise to three independent medieval kingdoms each ruled by a Jiménez monarch.

The Kingdom of Navarre, passing to the eldest son García, was unable to maintain its hegemony, leading to the full independence of Aragon under his illegitimate brother Ramiro I, who had previously taken over the territories of murdered brother Gonzalo of Sobrarbe and Ribagorza. Younger sibling Ferdinand I, then Count of Castile, killed in battle his nominal overlord the King of León and Galicia in 1037 and thereby inheriting them and bringing them fully into the orbit of his ruling clan. He then defeated García, achieving a sort of hegemony over his brothers, but again divided his realm among his sons. One of these, Alfonso VI, not only succeeded to the reunited realm of his father, but also conquered Toledo, reclaimed the imperial title and even pretended to rule over both Christian and Muslim Spain.

The Navarre branch of the dynasty went into eclipse when in 1076 Sancho IV was assassinated by his siblings, and his cousins Alfonso VI of Castile and Sancho Ramírez of Aragon converged and divided the kingdom, with the Aragon ruler gaining the Navarre crown, while ceding western lands to Castile.

The holdings of the family were briefly reunited when Alfonso the Battler of Navarre and Aragon married Alfonso VI's daughter Urraca, Queen of Castile and León, and claimed the imperial title. However, the marriage failed and the kingdoms of Castile and León passed out of the dynasty, to Urraca's son by a prior marriage. The Kingdom of Aragon and that of Navarre likewise went their separate ways following Alfonso's death, the former passing to his brother, the latter to a descendant of its original ruling family, with each eventually passing to other dynasties through heiresses: Petronilla of Aragon, who married the ruler of Barcelona and thus united those two realms into the Crown of Aragon; and Blanca, sister of Sancho VII of Navarre, whose 1234 death brought Jiménez rule to an end.

The Borgias of Italy in the 15th century would present a pedigree that traced their ancestry to Pedro de Atarés, lord of Borja, Zaragoza, who had been a competitor for the thrones of Navarre and Aragon following the death of Alfonso the Battler. Pedro was a scion of this family, being grandson of Sancho Ramírez, Count of Ribagorza, illegitimate brother of king Sancho Ramírez of Aragon. Such a descent would thus have made the Borgias male-line descendants of the Jiménez dynasty. However, the descent was a fabrication.

== Rulers ==
Partitions of the patrimony under Jiménez dynasty rule

Kingdom of León (718-1037)	County of Castile (850-1029)	County of Aragon (809-948)
Kingdom of Viguera (970-1002)
County of Aragon (994-997)
County of Castile (1029-1037)	Kingdom of Aragon (1035-1164)	Kingdom of Pamplona (1st creation) (905-1076)
Kingdom of León (1037-1126)	Kingdom of Galicia (1065-1071)	Kingdom of Castile (1065-1072)
Portucale (1096-1128)	Gallaecia (1090-1111)
Inherited agnatically by the House of Burgundy	Inherited agnatically by the House of Ivrea
Kingdom of Pamplona (2nd creation) (1134-1234)
Inherited agnatically by the House of Barcelona	Inherited cognatically by the House of Blois

Table of rulers

Ruler	Born	Reign	Ruling part	Consort	Death	Notes
García Jiménez	c.835 Son of Jimeno	c.850 – 885	Pamplona (as king)	Oneca of Sangüesa two children Dadildis of Pallars two children	After 885 at least 49-50	Sub- or co-king in a part of Pamplona, during the rule of Garcia I Iñiguez and/or Fortún Garcés of Pamplona.
Sancho I Abarca	c.860 Son of García Jiménez and Dadildis of Pallars	905 – 10 December 925	Kingdom of Pamplona	Toda Aznárez of Larraun six children	10 December 925; Resa aged 64-65	Supplanted Fortun Garcés as king of Pamplona.
Regency of Toda Aznárez of Larraun and Jimeno Garcés of Pamplona (925-933)						The proper rendition of García's regents is still debated. Toda was styled queen and apparently ruled a separate part of the kingdom in parallel with her son, and even Jimeno, García's uncle, appears as prince or king. García's marriage brought Aragon under Pamplona's sphere, and at García's death, the kingdom was divided.
García Sánchez I the Tremulous	919; Son of Sancho I and Toda Aznárez of Larraun	10 December 925 – 22 February 970	Kingdom of Pamplona	Andregoto Galíndez, Countess of Aragon c.935 (annulled 943) two children Teresa of León c.943 three children	22 February 970 aged 50-51	The proper rendition of García's regents is still debated. Toda was styled queen and apparently ruled a separate part of the kingdom in parallel with her son, and even Jimeno, García's uncle, appears as prince or king. García's marriage brought Aragon under Pamplona's sphere, and at García's death, the kingdom was divided.
Regency of Fortún Jiménez (948-958)						Children of García Sánchez. Sancho inherited, still underaged, his mother's county of Aragon, and after his father's death, he divided the kingdom with his brother Ramiro.
Sancho II	938; Son of García Sánchez I and Andregoto Galíndez of Aragon	948 – December 994	County of Aragon	Urraca Fernández of Castile; 962 four children	December 994 aged 55-56	Children of García Sánchez. Sancho inherited, still underaged, his mother's county of Aragon, and after his father's death, he divided the kingdom with his brother Ramiro.
Sancho II	938; Son of García Sánchez I and Andregoto Galíndez of Aragon	22 February 970 – December 994	Kingdom of Pamplona	Urraca Fernández of Castile; 962 four children	December 994 aged 55-56	Children of García Sánchez. Sancho inherited, still underaged, his mother's county of Aragon, and after his father's death, he divided the kingdom with his brother Ramiro.
Ramiro Garcés	c.945 Son of García Sánchez I and Teresa of León	22 February 970 – 9 July 981	Kingdom of Viguera	Unknown two sons	9 July 981 aged 35-36	Children of García Sánchez. Sancho inherited, still underaged, his mother's county of Aragon, and after his father's death, he divided the kingdom with his brother Ramiro.
Sancho Ramírez	? First son of Ramiro Garcés	9 July 981 – 1002	Kingdom of Viguera	Unknown a daughter?	c.1002	Left no male descendants and was succeeded by his brother. Possibly regent, or even king, of Pamplona 1000-1002
García Sánchez II	964; First son of Sancho II and Urraca Fernández of Castile	December 994 – June 1000	Pamplona (994-1000)	Jimena Fernández of Cea c.988 four children	June 1000 aged 35-36	Children of Sancho II, divided the kingdom. Gonzalo ruled under regency of his mother, probably died still a minor.
Regency of Urraca Fernández of Castile (994-997)						Children of Sancho II, divided the kingdom. Gonzalo ruled under regency of his mother, probably died still a minor.
Gonzalo Sánchez I	c.985? Second son of Sancho II and Urraca Fernández of Castile	December 994 – 997	County of Aragon	Unmarried	997 aged 11-12?	Children of Sancho II, divided the kingdom. Gonzalo ruled under regency of his mother, probably died still a minor.
Aragon was reabsorbed in Pamplona
García Ramírez	? Second son of Ramiro Garcés	1002	Kingdom of Viguera	Toda two children	c.1025?	After his death with no male descendants, Viguera was reabsorbed in Pamplona.
Viguera was reabsorbed in Pamplona
Regency of Urraca Fernández of Castile and Jimena Fernández of Cea (1000-1010)						His death precipitated a division of the historical Pamplona lands, a distribution that evolved into three Iberian kingdoms: Aragon, Navarre and Castile.
Sancho III the Great	c.992 Son of Garcia Sánchez II and Jimena Fernández of Cea	June 1000 – 18 October 1035 (Styled Emperor since 1034)	Kingdom of Pamplona	Muniadona of Castile c.1011 five children	18 October 1035 aged 42-43	His death precipitated a division of the historical Pamplona lands, a distribution that evolved into three Iberian kingdoms: Aragon, Navarre and Castile.
Ramiro I	1006/7; Illegitimate son of Sancho III of Pamplona and Sancha of Aibar	18 October 1035 – 8 May 1063	Kingdom of Aragon	Gerberga Ermesinde of Foix c.1035 five children Agnes of Aquitaine I after 1049 no children	8 May 1063; Graus aged 56-57	Children of Sancho III, divided their inheritance. Ramiro received lands in Aragon that he eventually expanded into a sub-kingdom through the absorption of his brother Gonzalo's counties; García was the eldest legitimate son of Sancho III, and as so received Pamplona and suzereignty over his brothers; Fernando received, after his maternal uncle's death, his mother's county of Castile, domain that, through his marriage, expanded to the neighbouring Kingdom of León, which was divided after his death; Gonzalo also received the counties of Sobrarbe and Ribagorza from his mother, but left no descendants, which determined their annexation to Aragon.
García Sánchez III of Nájera	1012; Nájera; First son of Sancho III and Muniadona of Castile	18 October 1035 – 1 September 1054	Kingdom of Pamplona	Stephanie of Foix; 1038; Barcelona eight children	1 September 1054; Atapuerca aged 41-42	
Fernando I the Great	1016; Second son of Sancho III of Pamplona and Muniadona of Castile	13 May 1029 – 27 December 1065	County of Castile	Sancha, Queen of León; 1032 five children	27 December 1065; León aged 48-49	
Fernando I the Great	1016; Second son of Sancho III of Pamplona and Muniadona of Castile	4 September 1037 – 27 December 1065 (Styled Emperor since 1056)	Kingdom of León (jure uxoris)	Sancha, Queen of León; 1032 five children	27 December 1065; León aged 48-49	
Gonzalo Sánchez II	1020; Third son of Sancho III of Pamplona and Muniadona of Castile	18 October 1035 – 26 June 1045	County of Sobrarbe and County of Ribagorza	Unmarried	26 June 1045 aged 24-25	
Sobrarbe and Ribagorza were absorbed by Aragon
Sancho IV the Noble	1039; Son of Garcia Sánchez III and Stephanie of Foix	1 September 1054 – 4 June 1076	Kingdom of Pamplona	Plaisance of Normandy c.1068 three children	4 June 1076; Peñalén aged 36-37	Assassinated. He left a minor child, Garcia Sanchez, but he was considered not fit for the throne for his age. The Kingdom was divided between León and Aragon, with the throne itself being inherited by Aragon.
Pamplona temporarily annexed to Aragon
Sancho I & V	1042; Son of Ramiro I and Gerberga Ermesinde of Foix	8 May 1063 – 4 June 1094	Kingdom of Aragon (with Kingdom of Pamplona since 1076)	Isabella of Urgell; 1065 (annulled 1070) one child Felicia of Roucy; 1076 three children	4 June 1094; Huesca aged 51-52	Children of Ramiro I. Sancho inherited the Aragonese kingdom, and was chosen as the new king of Pamplona in 1076, reuniting the kingdoms once more. As for Sancha, she is cited as an administrator (not a nun) of the convent of Santa Cruz de la Serós, and as an owner of an Infantado.
Sancha	1045; Jaca; Daughter of Ramiro I and Gerberga Ermesinde of Foix	8 May 1063 – 16 August 1097	Kingdom of Aragon (in the Infantado of Santa Cruz de la Serós)	Ermengol III, Count of Urgell; 1063 no children	16 August 1097; Santa Cruz de la Serós aged 51-52	Children of Ramiro I. Sancho inherited the Aragonese kingdom, and was chosen as the new king of Pamplona in 1076, reuniting the kingdoms once more. As for Sancha, she is cited as an administrator (not a nun) of the convent of Santa Cruz de la Serós, and as an owner of an Infantado.
The Infantado re-merged in Aragon
Sancho II the Strong	1038; Zamora; First son of Fernando I and Sancha of León	27 December 1065 – 7 October 1072	Kingdom of Castile (with Kingdom of León and Kingdom of Galicia since 1071)	Alberta no children	7 October 1072; Zamora aged 33-34	Children of Fernando I, divided the kingdom. In 1071, started the fight for single sovereignty: Sancho, as the elder, and king of Castile, expelled his brothers Alfonso from León and García from Galicia. While García was deposed and incarcerated, Alfonso managed to escape to Toledo, but returned next year and took the throne with the help of his sister Urraca. Sancho ended up assassinated in 1072, allowing Alfonso to reunite all the Leonese territory. García tried to return after Sancho's assassination, but Alfonso arrested and banished him to the Castle of Luna, where he eventually died many years later. From c.1090, Alfonso ceded and divided the westernmost part of the kingdom between his daughters and their husbands.
Alfonso VI the Brave	1040; Santiago de Compostela; Second son of Fernando I and Sancha of León	27 December 1065 – 1071 7 October 1072 – 1 July 1109 (Styled Emperor since 1077)	Kingdom of León	Agnes of Aquitaine II; 1073/4 no children Constance of Burgundy; 1079 one child Bertha (of Savoy?); 25 November 1093 no children Isabel c.1100 two (three?) children Beatrice; 1108 no children	1 July 1109; Toledo aged 68-69	
García II	April 1043; Zamora; Third son of Fernando I and Sancha of León	27 December 1065 – 1071	Kingdom of Galicia	Unmarried	21 March 1090; Los Barrios de Luna aged 46	
Urraca	1033; León; First daughter of Fernando I and Sancha of León	27 December 1065 – 1101	Kingdom of León (in the Infantado of Zamora)	Unmarried	1101; León aged 67-68	
Elvira	1038; Second daughter of Fernando I and Sancha of León	27 December 1065 – 15 November 1099	Kingdom of León (in the Infantado of Toro)	Unmarried	15 November 1099 agde 60-61	
Galicia, Castile and the Infantados were re-absorbed by León.
Pedro I	1068; Son of Sancho I & V and Isabella of Urgell	4 June 1094 – 28 September 1104	Kingdom of Aragon (with Kingdom of Pamplona)	Agnes of Aquitaine III; 1086; Jaca two children Bertha (of Savoy II?); 1097 no children	28 September 1104; Val d'Aran aged 35-36	His children didn't survive him and he was succeeded by his brother Alfonso.
Urraca the Reckless	24 June 1081; León; Daughter of Alfonso VI and Constance of Burgundy	1090 – 1111	Gallaecia	Raymond of Burgundy c.1087 two children Alfonso I, King of Aragon; 1109 (annulled 1112) no children	8 March 1126; Saldaña de Burgos aged 44-45	Daughters of Alfonso VI, received, during their father's lifetime, domain over the westernmost lands of the Kingdom of León. Teresa ruled in Portugal with her husband since 1096: her ambition of reuniting the county with the old Kingdom of Galicia, with her adoption of royal title from 1116, and alliances with important Galician families led the Portuguese nobles to support her son Afonso Henriques as a candidate for the comital throne. Teresa ended up deposed after her defeat at Battle of São Mamede in 1128. Urraca abdicated from Galicia to her son in 1111, but her problematic marriage with Alfonso of Aragon brought many conflicts between the spouses, even after their separation in 1112, conflicts that endured throughout most of her reign.
Urraca the Reckless	24 June 1081; León; Daughter of Alfonso VI and Constance of Burgundy	1 July 1109 – 8 March 1126 (Styled Empress since 1109)	Kingdom of León	Raymond of Burgundy c.1087 two children Alfonso I, King of Aragon; 1109 (annulled 1112) no children	8 March 1126; Saldaña de Burgos aged 44-45	
Teresa	1080; Illegitimate daughter of Alfonso VI of León and Jimena Muñoz	1096 – 24 June 1128	Portucale	Henry of Burgundy; 1096 six children	11 November 1130; Montederramo aged 49-50	
With the deaths of Teresa and Urraca, the Portuguese and Leonese lines continued through their respective cognatic descendants, but extinguished agnatically.
Alfonso I the Battler	1073; First son of Sancho I & V and Felicia of Roucy	28 December 1104 – 7 September 1134 (Styled Emperor since 1109)	Kingdom of Aragon (with Kingdom of Pamplona)	Urraca I, Queen of León; 1109 (annulled 1112) no children	7 September 1134; Poleñino aged 60-61	Died without children. Left his kingdoms to the knightly orders, the nobility of the two kingdoms chose different scions of the Jiménez dynasty as their kings, separating again the two kingdoms.
García Ramírez the Restorer	1112; Son of Ramiro Sánchez of Pamplona and Cristina Rodríguez de Vívar	7 September 1134 – 21 November 1150	Kingdom of Pamplona	Margaret of L'Aigle; 1130 four children Urraca of Castile the Asturian; 24 June 1144; León no children	21 November 1150; Yerri aged 37-38	Heirs of Alfonso I of Aragon, their accession redivided the Kingdom of Aragon. García Ramírez, grandson of Sancho Garcés, an illegitimate son of Garcia Sánchez III of Pamplona, was elected king of Pamplona, and therefore revived Pamplona's independence. On the ohther hand, Aragon was inherited by the hesitant cleric brother of Alfonso, Ramiro II, who abdicated as soon as he had an heiress, marrying her to the count of Barcelona (to whom he passed royal authority) and returning then to the monastery.
Ramiro II the Monk	24 April 1086; Second son of Sancho I & V and Felicia of Roucy	7 September 1134 – 13 November 1137	Kingdom of Aragon	Agnes of Aquitaine IV; 13 November 1135; Jaca (annulled 1136/7) one child	16 August 1157; Huesca aged 71	
Regency of Ramon Berenguer IV, Count of Barcelona (1137-1157)						The dynastic union of 1137 gave rise to the Crown of Aragon. Through the prenuptial agreement (Capitulaciones matrimoniales) under Aragonese law, Petronila I was the sole queen, while Ramon Berenguer IV only becoming consort princeps but not king nor proprietor of the Kingdom of Aragon. After his death, Petronila abdicated in 1164 to their son, Alfonso II of Aragon who continued the dynasty of House of Aragon and also inheritating the title of count of Barcelona following his father's House of Barcelona. After the abdication, she pursued a monastic life for herself.
Petronilla	29 June/11 August 1136; Huesca; Daughter of Ramiro II and Agnes of Aquitaine IV	13 November 1137 – 18 July 1164	Kingdom of Aragon	Ramon Berenguer IV, Count of Barcelona; August 1150; Lleida five children	15 October 1173; Barcelona aged 37	
Sancho VI the Wise	21 April 1132; Son of García Ramírez and Margaret of L'Aigle	21 November 1150 – 27 June 1194	Kingdom of Pamplona (until 1162) Kingdom of Navarre (from 1162)	Sancha of León and Castile; 2 June 1157; Carrión de los Condes six children	27 June 1194; Pamplona aged 62	First to be called King of Navarre. He was responsible for bringing his kingdom into the political orbit of Europe.
Sancho VII the Strong	17 April 1154; Tudela; Son of Sancho VI and Sancha of León and Castile	27 June 1194 – 7 April 1234	Kingdom of Navarre	Constance of Toulouse; 1195 (annulled 1200) no children	7 April 1234; Tudela aged 80	Left no descendants. The Navarrese throne went to his French nephew, the count of Champagne.
With the death of Sancho VII the line of the Jimenez family died out in Navarre, which were inherited by Theobald I of Navarre, from the House of Champagne. As Sancho VII was the last living member of the family at the time of his death, Jimena dynasty became extinct after his death.

== Family tree of the House of Jiménez ==
Aznar I count of Aragon; HOUSE OF COUNTS OF ARAGON	Íñigo king of Pamplona; HOUSE OF ÍÑIGUEZ
Galindo I count of Aragon	García king of Pamplona
Athnar II count of Aragon	Onneca Garcés	Jiméno; HOUSE OF JIMÉNES	(daughter)	Sancho	Fortún king of Pamplona
Garcia co- or sub-king of Pamplona	Aznar count of Laron/Larraun	Onneca Fortúnez
Galindo II count of Aragon	Sancha Garcés	Sancho I king of Pamplona	Toda	Jiméno king of Pamplona	Sancha Aznares
Andregoto	Garcia I king of Pamplona, count of Aragon
Sancho II king of Pamplona, count of Aragon	Ramiro king of Viguera
Garcia II king of Pamplona, count of Aragon	Gonzalo count of Aragon	Sancho king of Viguera	Garcia king of Viguera
Sancho III king of Pamplona, count of Aragon	Muniadona countess of Castile; HOUSE OF BENI MAMADUNA	Alfonso V king of León; HOUSE OF ASTUR-LEÓN
(illeg.) Ramiro I king of Aragon; HOUSE OF ARAGON	Garcia III king of Pamplona	Jiména	Bermundo III king of León	Ferdinand I king of Castile, León; KINGDOM OF CASTILE-LEÓN	Sancha	Gonzalo count of Sobrabe & Ribagorza
(illeg.) Sancho Ramírez, Count of Ribagorza	Sancho V king of Pamplona, king of Aragon	García Ramírez (bishop)	Sancho IV king of Pamplona	(illeg.) Sancho lord of Uncastillo	Ramiro lord of Calhorra	Sancho II king of Castile	Alfonso VI king of León	Garcia II king of Galicia
Garcia lord of Aivar & Atarès	Peter I king of Pamplona, king of Aragon	Alfonso I king of Pamplona, king of Aragon	Ramiro II of Aragon king of Aragon	Christina (daughter of El Cid)	Ramiro lord of Monzón	Raymond; CASTILIAN HOUSE OF IVREA	Urraca queen of Castile & León	Sancho heir apparent	Teresa countess of Portugal	Henry; PORTUGUESE HOUSE OF BURGUNDY
Pedro de Atarés	Ramon Berenguer IV; Count of Barcelona; HOUSE OF BARCELONA	Petronilla I queen of Aragon	Garcia IV king of Navarre; KINGDOM OF NAVARRE	Kings of Castille	Kings of Portugal
Alfonso II king of Aragon count of Barcelona	Sancho VI king of Navarre	Henry count of Montescaglioso
Kings of Aragon	Sancho VII king of Navarre	Blanche regent of Navarre	Theobald III count of Champagne; HOUSE OF BLOIS

House of Jiménez
Preceded by House of Íñiguez	Ruling House of Pamplona; 905–1234	Succeeded by House of Blois-Campagne
Preceded by (founder)	Ruling House of Aragon; 948–1035 (as counts); 1035–1164 (as kings)	Succeeded by House of Barcelona
Preceded by House of Beni Mamaduna	Ruling House of Castile; 1037–1126	Succeeded by Castilian House of Ivrea
Preceded by House of Asturias-León	Ruling House of León; 1037–1126	Succeeded by Castilian House of Ivrea
