= Jimeno of Pamplona =

Navarrese monarch

- Co- or sub-king in Pamplona (disputed)
- Reign: 9th century
- Predecessor: Unknown
- Successor: García Jiménez of Pamplona
- Born: c. 820
- Died: 9th century
- Issue: García Jiménez of Pamplona; Íñigo Jiménez
- Dynasty: Jiménez dynasty

Jimeno (Ximeno) I, (not to be confused with the 8th-century Jimeno the Strong (Spanish: Jimeno el Fuerte)), was the 9th century father of García Jiménez of Pamplona. In spite of various biographical details having been created, there are no unambiguous records of his existence except in the patronymics of his sons, García and Íñigo Jiménez, indicating a father named Jimeno. In 850, the French court received envoys from Induo and Mitio, "dukes of the Navarrese", and it has been supposed that these names represent those of Íñigo Arista and Jimeno, but Sánchez Albornoz argued against the latter identification. Likewise, it has been suggested that, like his son, he may have been ruler of "another part of the kingdom" of Pamplona, or even that he was regent of the entire kingdom (for which there is no evidence). The location of his hypothetical principality has been placed around Álava, where Count Vela Jiménez, traditionally thought to have been his son (again based on patronymic), held sway.

He has sometimes been described as Jimeno the Strong, but this likely results from confusion with a much earlier man of that name. Likewise, he sometimes appears as Jimeno Garcés due to hypotheses about his origins. The belief that he was a kinsman of Íñigo I Arista has led to various reconstructed pedigrees, filling the gaps with otherwise unknown or chronologically misplaced individuals, the most common version making him the son of a García Jiménez, and thereby making "Garcés" the patronymic of Jimeno.

If he ruled, he was apparently succeeded in his principality by his son García Jiménez. He is noteworthy as the earliest documented ancestor of a royal house, the Jiménez, that displaced the line of Arista in 905 and reigned in Navarre until 1234.

No record of his wife remains, although historian Justo Pérez de Urbel has suggested that he was the unnamed prince of Pamplona who married Leodegundia Ordoñez, daughter of King Ordoño I of Asturias. Sánchez Albornoz harbors no doubts that Leodegundia married a king of Pamplona, as mentioned in the "Códice de Roda" when she is called Domna Leodegundia Regina, nevertheless, he believes that she would have married a reigning king, not Jimeno of Pamplona, who would also have been much too old for her and that, in any case, the most likely candidate would have been either García Íñiguez or his son Fortún Garcés.

Jimeno had at least two children, both documented:

- García Jiménez, (Note: He and his brother Íñigo are mentioned in the Códice de Roda as Garsea Scemenonis et Enneco Scemenonis fratres fuerunt (García Jiménez and Íñigo Jiménez were brothers).) who apparently succeeded him
- Íñigo Jiménez, named as the brother of García Jiménez in the Códice de Roda. (Note: It has been suggested that this may be an erroneous reference to Íñigo Arista,)

It has also been suggested that he was the father of two other children, although both hypotheses have been contested:

- Vela Jiménez, (Note: Lacarra de Miguel mentions the hypothesis put forward by Gregorio Balbarda who believes that García and Íñigo Jiménez were the brothers of Count Vela Jiménez of Álava. Sánchez Albornoz considers it absurd to base such filiation on the patronymic since there were numerous individuals attested in charters named Jimeno.) founder of the Vela clan, the connection is not directly attested, but has been speculated based primarily on his patronymic, geography, and chronology.
- Oneca, wife of Count Diogo Fernandes, the parents of several children, including Jimeno, Leodegundia, and Countess Mumadona Dias. This identification is linked to Pérez de Urbel's hypothesis that Leodegundia Ordoñez was Jimeno's wife but others assign Oneca other parentage and suggest that Leodegundia could have married King García Íñiguez of Pamplona. (Note: Oneca could have been the daughter of Leodegundia, supposed daughter of King Ordoño I of Asturias, who would have married a prince of Pamplona, based on a document where King Ramiro II of León calls Mumadona Dias his aunt.)

He is also recorded as the progenitor of the House of Albret.

Unknown	possible Co- or Sub-king in Pamplona	Succeeded by García Jiménez

== Sources ==
- Cañada Juste, Alberto (2011). "En los albores del reino ¿dinastía Íñiga?, ¿dinastía Jimena" (PDF). Príncipe de Viana (in Spanish). I, Separata (253): 229–248. ISSN 0032-8472.
- Cardozo, Mário (1962). "Sería Mumadona tia de Ramiro II, Rei de Leão?" (PDF). Revista de Guimarães (in Portuguese). Vol. 72, no. 2–3. Sociedade Martins Sarmento. pp. 376–391. Archived from the original (PDF) on 2015-09-23.
- Lacarra de Miguel, José María (1945). "Textos navarros del Códice de Roda" (PDF). Estudios de Edad Media de la Corona de Aragón. 1: 193–284. OCLC 694519776. Archived from the original (PDF) on 2016-03-03.
- Pérez de Urbel, Justo (1951). "Jimenos y Velas en Portugal". Revista Portuguesa de História (in Spanish) (5). University of Coimbra: 475–492. doi:10.14195/0870-4147_5_17. ISSN 0870-4147.
- Pérez de Urbel, Justo (1954). "Lo viejo y lo nuevo sobre el origin del Reino de Pamplona". Al-Andalus (in Spanish). 19 (1): 1–42. ISSN 0304-4335.
- Sánchez Albornoz, Claudio (1959). "Problemas de la historia Navarra del siglo IX" (PDF). Príncipe de Viana (in Spanish) (20): 5–62. ISSN 0032-8472.
- Torres Sevilla-Quiñones de León, Margarita Cecilia (1999). Linajes nobiliarios de León y Castilla: Siglos IX-XIII (in Spanish). Salamanca: Junta de Castilla y León, Consejería de educación y cultura. ISBN 84-7846-781-5.
