= House of Aragon =

House of Aragon may refer to:

- the branch of the Jiménez dynasty that ruled Aragon as kings between 1035 and 1162
- the House of Barcelona, which ruled Aragon between 1137 and 1410, united Aragon and Catalonia and ruled Sicily from 1282 until 1409
- the branch of the House of Trastámara that ruled Aragon and Sicily between 1412 and 1555 and Naples between 1442 and 1555

== See also ==
- Crown of Aragon
- House of Habsburg (ruled Aragon 1516–1700)
- House of Bourbon (ruled Aragon 1700–1715)
