= Sancho I of Pamplona =

King of Pamplona from 905 to 925

Sancho I
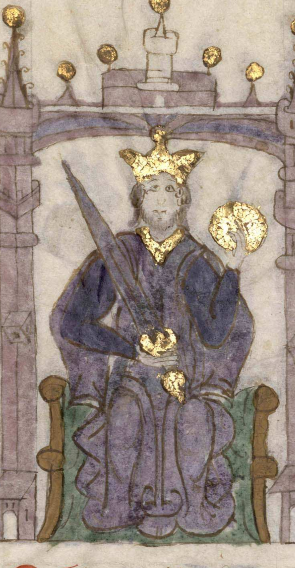
- Depiction in the Castilian manuscript Compendium of Chronicles of Kings, c. 1312–1325

King of Pamplona
- Reign: 905–925
- Predecessor: Fortún Garcés
- Successor: Jimeno Garcés
- Born: c. 860
- Died: 10 December 925; Resa
- Burial: Castle of San Esteban Deio, Villamayor de Monjardín
- Consort: Toda
- Issue more...: García Sánchez I Urraca Sánchez; Onneca Sánchez of Pamplona
- House: House of Jiménez
- Father: García Jiménez
- Mother: Dadildis de Pallars

Sancho Garcés I (Basque: Antso I.a Gartzez; c. 860 – 10 December 925), also known as Sancho I, was king of Pamplona from 905 until 925. He was the son of García Jiménez and was the first king of Pamplona of the Jiménez dynasty. Sancho I was the feudal ruler of the Onsella valley, and expanded his power to all the neighboring territories. He was chosen to replace Fortún Garcés by the Pamplonese nobility in 905.

== Nickname ==
His grandson Sancho II of Pamplona is sometimes referred to as Sancho Abarca by modern sources. This appellation was first applied to Sancho II by chroniclers writing centuries after his time who were confused about the succession to Pamplona, creating a single ruler out of the combined careers of Sancho II and his grandfather Sancho I of Pamplona. The weight of evidence suggests that this nickname originally applied to Sancho I.

== Biography ==
Sancho Garcés was born around the year 860, son of García Jiménez and his second wife Dadildis de Pallars. Around the time of the death of King García Íñiguez he ruled the Onsella valley in the western part of the kingdom. He managed to take control of the city of Pamplona while Fortún Garcés was still king, aided by Alfonso III of Asturias and the Count of Pallars. Along with the Pamplonese nobility, they plotted to remove the king's children from the line of succession, which passed down to the king's granddaughter Toda, who was married to Sancho Garcés. He proclaimed himself King of Pamplona in 905.

Throughout his reign, he involved himself in the squabbles among the Muslim lords to the south with repeated success. In 907, he turned on his former ally Lubb ibn Muhammad, killing him in battle. Four years later, another former ally, Galindo Aznárez, joined with his brother-in-law Muhammad al-Tawil and Abd Allah ibn Lubb al-Qasawi to attack Sancho, but they were defeated and neutralized as a threat. Al-Tawil fled and was killed shortly afterward, and the power of the Banu Qasi was severely crippled, while Galindo was forced into vassalage to Sancho, leading to the incorporation of the County of Aragon into the Pamplona kingdom.

In 918, Sancho combined with Ordoño II of León to attack the Upper March. Though they failed to occupy Nájera, they took Calahorra, Arnedo and Viguera from the Banu Qasi, and attacked Valtierra, and though they failed to take its fortress, they burned its mosque and surrounding lands. Two years later Sancho teamed with Bernard I of Ribagorza and Amrus ibn Muhammed, son of Muhammad al-Tawil, to attack Banu Qasi-held Monzón. His successes allowed him to join Lower Navarre to his own dominions and extend his territory as far as Nájera. As a thanksgiving offering for his victories, in 924 he founded the monastery of San Martín de Albelda.

He died near the town of Resa, close to the Ebro river on 10 December 925, and was buried in Villamayor de Monjardín. His son, García, was only seven years old, so Sancho was succeeded by his brother, Jimeno Garcés.

Sancho appears to have been the original king called by the byname Abarca, though confusion among family members of the same name had led to it being instead applied to his grandson, Sancho II of Pamplona, by the 19th century. Sancho I gave rise to a dynasty that would rule several Iberian kingdoms, the last ruling until the 13th century, and the dynasty would be called the Banu Sanyo or the Banu Abarca by Al-Andalus scholars, denoting his role as founder.

== Marriage and issue ==
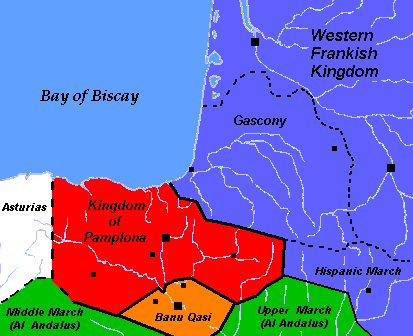
The Kingdom of Pamplona at the death of Sancho I

Sancho Garcés was married to Toda Aznárez, daughter of the Count Aznar Sánchez and Onneca Fortúnez, herself being daughter of Fortún Garcés. According to the Códice de Roda, they had one son, García, and five daughters, all of whom except Orbita married either kings of León or counts:

- Urraca Sánchez, Queen consort of the Kingdom of León from 931 until 951 after marrying, as his second wife, Ramiro II of León.
- Onneca Sánchez, Queen consort of the Kingdom of León from 926 until 931 after marrying Alfonso IV of León.
- Sancha Sánchez (died between 949 and 963), was queen consort of León as the third wife of King Ordoño II. After the king's death in 924, she married Álvaro Herraméliz, Count of Álava and then, after his death in 931, she became the wife of Fernán González, Count of Castile, who also succeeded her second husband as count of Álava.
- Velasquita Sánchez, married first to Munio Vélaz, Count of Álava, second to Galindo of Ribargoza and third to Fortún Galindez.
- Orbita Sánchez, nothing is known about her life.
- García Sánchez I, King of Pamplona from 925 until 970, married first to Andregoto Galíndez, daughter of the Count of Aragon Galindo Aznárez II and later to Teresa Ramírez, daughter of Ramiro II of León and his first wife, Adosinda Gutiérrez.

Out of wedlock, he had a daughter, Lupa Sánchez, who was married to Dato II, Count of Bigorre, with whom she had one son, Raymond I, Count of Bigorre (940–956).

== Bibliography ==
- Cañada Juste, Alberto (2012). "¿Quién fue Sancho Abarca?" (PDF). Príncipe de Viana (in Spanish) (Año 73, N. 255): 79–132. ISSN 0032-8472.
- Lacarra de Miguel, José María (1945). "Textos navarros del Códice de Roda" (PDF). Estudios de Edad Media de la Corona de Aragón (in Spanish). 1: 193–284. OCLC 694519776. Archived from the original (PDF) on 2016-03-03.
- Martínez Díez, Gonzalo (2007). Sancho III el Mayor Rey de Pamplona, Rex Ibericus (in Spanish). Madrid: Marcial Pons Historia. ISBN 978-84-96467-47-7.
- Salas Merino, Vicente (2008) (in Spanish). La Genealogía de Los Reyes de España The Genealogy of the Kings of Spain (4th ed.). Madrid: Editorial Visión Libros. pp. 216–218. ISBN 978-84-9821-767-4.

| Preceded by Fortún Garcés | King of Pamplona; 905–925 | Succeeded by Jimeno Garcés |
