= Toda of Pamplona =

Queen of Pamplona from 905 to 925

Toda
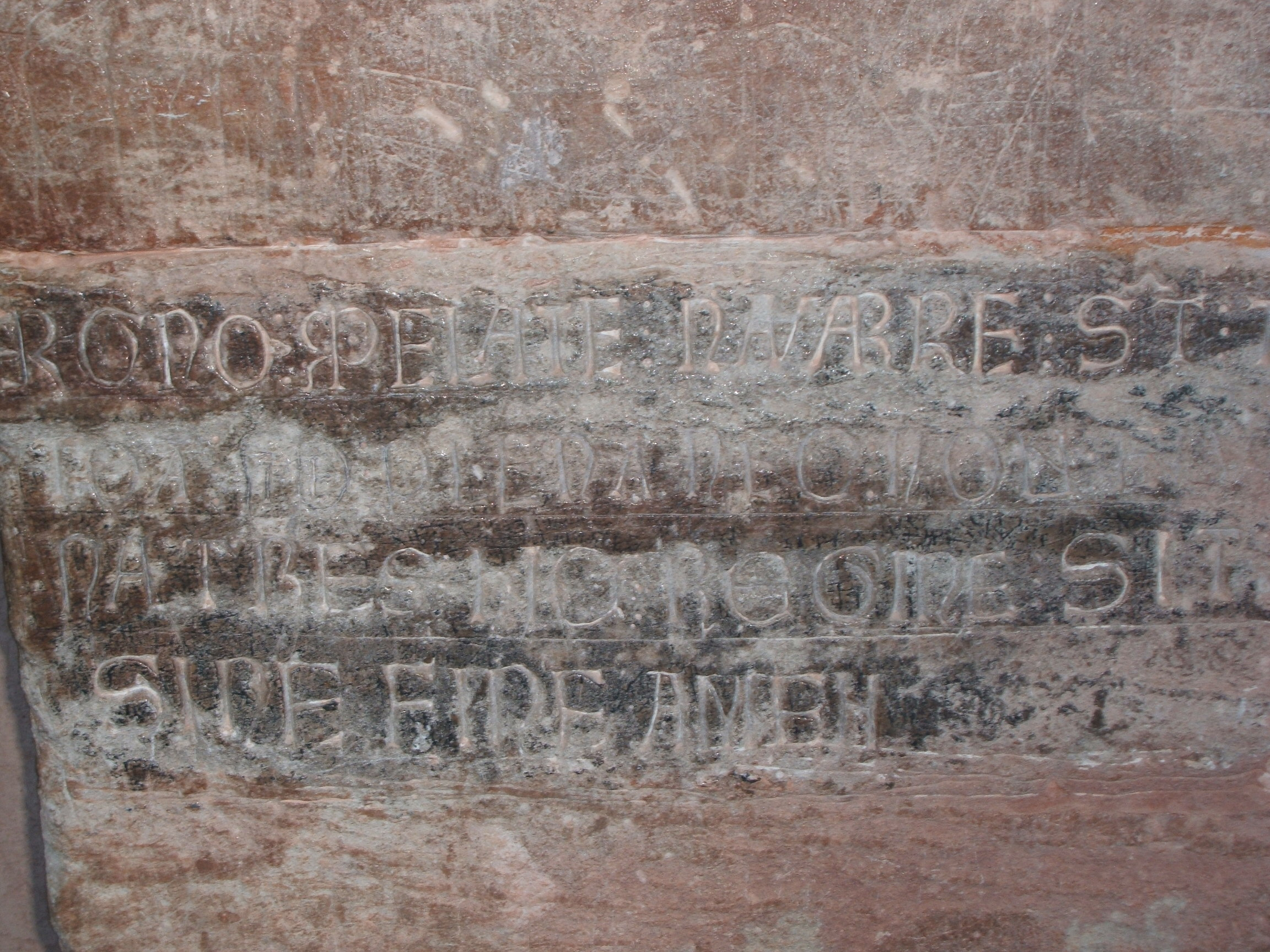
- Toda's tomb's inscription

Queen consort of Pamplona
- Tenure: 905 – 925

Queen regent of Pamplona
- Regency: 931–934
- Monarch: García Sánchez I

Queen of Deio and Lizarrara
- Reign: c. 958
- Died: 958
- Burial: Monastery of San Millán de Suso
- Spouse: Sancho I of Pamplona
- Issue: Garcia Sanchez I of Pamplona; Urraca Sánchez of Pamplona; Onneca Sánchez of Pamplona
- Father: Aznar Sánchez of Larraun
- Mother: Onneca Fortúnez

Toda Aznárez (Basque: Tota Aznar; died 15 October 958), known as Toda of Pamplona, was queen of Pamplona by her marriage to Sancho I. She ruled the kingdom as regent during the minority of her son García Sánchez I from 931. She was herself descended from the previous royal dynasty, Aritza.

== Family ==
Toda was daughter of Aznar Sánchez of Larraun, paternal grandson of King García Íñiguez of Pamplona, while her mother Onneca Fortúnez was a daughter of King Fortún Garcés. Thus, Toda was a descendant of the Íñigo Arista dynasty of Navarrese monarchs. Toda was an aunt or cousin of Caliph Abd-al-Rahman III. (Note: The relationship of Toda and her siblings to Abd al-Rahman III is based on the genealogy of the rulers of Pamplona found in the Códice de Roda, which reports that Sancho, Toda and Sancha were born to Onneca's first marriage to Aznar Sánchez, and Abd-al-Rahman III was grandson of a second marriage to Emir ‘Abdullah ibn Muhammad. However, the resulting timeline has been dismissed as it would necessitate Toda being improbably old at the time of her son García's birth. Most historians have concluded that the Códice reversed the order of Onneca's marriages, though this alternative timeline is not without its own difficulties. Arturo Cañada Juste has recently proposed that a different error underlies the problem, that the Códice partially confused Onneca Fortuñez, wife of Aznar Sánchez, with her aunt Onneca Garcés, wife of Aznar Galíndez II of Aragon. Were it the latter Onneca who was also wife of ‘Abdullah, it would resolve chronological concerns, while making Abd-al-Rahman III the first cousin, rather than nephew, of Toda and her siblings.) Toda was married to King Sancho I of Pamplona, with whom she had the following children:

- Urraca, queen of León from 931 until 951 as the wife of Ramiro II;
- Onneca, queen of León from 926 until 931 as the wife of Alfonso IV;
- Sancha, queen consort of León in 923–4 and countess of Castile as the wife of Fernán González;
- Velasquita, married first to Count Munio Vélaz of Álava, then to Galindo of Ribagorza, and finally to Fortún Galindez;
- Orbita;
- García I, king of Pamplona from 925 until 970.

Having died while their son was still underage, Toda's husband was succeeded by his brother Jimeno Garcés, who was married to Toda's sister Sancha.

== Rule ==
With the death of her brother-in-law King Jimeno in 931, Queen Toda became regent and guardian for her young son, García Sánchez I. In 934 Toda signed a treaty pledging allegiance to her nephew Abd-ar-Rahman III, and released hostages of the Banu Di n-Nun clan, the caliph confirming the rule of her son García (this has sometimes been interpreted as an act of the Caliph to liberate García from his mother's direct control). This led to the rebellion in Falces by a count Fortún Garcés, an "irascible man who hated Muslims", the uprising being suppressed with Cordoban arms. Toda violated her treaty in 937, forcing a punitive campaign.

During several stretches she appears in the royal charters of the kingdom to the exclusion of her daughter-in-law, the queen, from 947 to 955, and again in 959. In 958 she was ruling her own subkingdom, in the area of "Deio" and "Lizarrara".

The same year, she took an interest in the health of her Leonese grandson Sancho I, whose obesity was largely responsible for his dethronement. Toda requested the assistance of Abd-ar-Rahman III, the Caliphate of Córdoba being renowned for its physicians. The caliph sent her his Jewish physician Hasdai ibn Shaprut, who promised to cure Sancho on condition that Toda visit the city of Córdoba. Therefore, Toda, her son García Sánchez I of Pamplona and grandson Sancho I of León, nobles and clergymen arrived in Córdoba, where they were received with full honors and amid much pomp. The arrival of this Christian queen in the capital of an Islamic caliphate enhanced Abd-ar-Rahman III's prestige among his subjects, and is considered a landmark in the history of medieval diplomacy. Sancho's medical treatment was successful, and he was "relieved from his excessive corpulence."

Toda was an energetic diplomat, arranging political marriages for her daughters among the competing royalty and nobility of Christian Iberia. She died in 958.

== Sources ==
- Azizur Rahman, Syed (2001). The Story of Islamic Spain. New Delhi: Goodword Books. ISBN 978-81-87570-57-8.
- Cañada Juste, Arturo (2013). "Doña Onneca, una princesa vascona en la corte de los emires cordobeses". Príncipe de Viana (in Spanish). 74 (258): 481–502. ISSN 0032-8472.
- Cantera Burgos, Francisco (1966). "Christian Spain". In Roth, Cecil (ed.). The World History of the Jewish People. 2nd series: Medieval Period. Vol. 2, The Dark Ages: Jews in Christian Europe, 711–1096. Tel Aviv: Massadah Publishing. pp. 357–381. OCLC 230268286.
- Collins, Roger, "Queens-Dowager and Queens-Regnant in Tenth-Century León and Navarre", in John Carmi Parsons, Medieval Queenship, 1998, pp. 79–92
- Guichard, Pierre (2008). "El apogeo del Islam andalusí (siglo X – inicios del siglo XIII)". Las Españas medievales. Biblioteca de Bolsillo, v. 133 (in Spanish). Barcelona: Editorial Critica. pp. 85–127. ISBN 978-84-7423-812-9.
- Hajji, Abd al-Rahman Ali (1970). Andalusian Diplomatic Relations with Western Europe during the Umayyad Period (A.H. 138–366 / A.D. 755–976): An Historical Survey (1st ed.). Beirut: Dar al-Irshad. OCLC 3242315.
- Jayyusi, Salma Khadra, ed. (1992). The Legacy of Muslim Spain. Handbuch der Orientalistik. Vol. Part 1, Volume 12. Leiden: E.J. Brill. ISBN 978-90-04-09599-1.
- Nykl, Alois Richard (1974). Hispano-Arabic Poetry and Its Relations with the Old Provençal Troubadours. Geneva: Slatkine. OCLC 461778757.
- Vallvé Bermejo, Joaquín (1992). El Califato de Córdoba. Colecciones MAPFRE 1492, v. 6 (in Spanish). Madrid: Editorial MAPFRE. ISBN 978-84-7100-406-2.

Royal titles
| Preceded by Auria | Queen consort of Pamplona; 905–925 | Succeeded by Sancha Aznárez or Andregoto Galíndez |
