= Jimeno Garcés =

King of Pamplona from 925 to 932/3

Jimeno Garcés, (Note: Latin: Scemeno Garseanis, Garsianes or Garcianes, or Semeno (Xemeno) Garsiez.) sometimes Jimeno II (died 932/3), was the King of Pamplona from 925 until his death. He was the brother of King Sancho I Garcés and son of García Jiménez by his second wife, Dadildis of Pallars. When his brother died, Sancho's only son, García Sánchez, was still a child and Jimeno succeeded his brother, becoming the second ruler of the Jiménez dynasty.

== Reign ==
In 927, Jimeno took an army south to support Muhammad ibn Lubb ibn Muhammad of the Banu Qasi against the Córdoba-allied Banu Tujib, and Jimeno's presence there forced Abd-ar-Rahman III, Emir of Córdoba to retreat without offering battle. By 928 at the latest Jimeno's nephew García was "formally associated ... as joint ruler". A document in the archives of the monastery of San Juan de la Peña confirming a boundary settlement reached under King Fortún Garcés was issued when "[the aforementioned King] Jimeno Garcés was ruling with his ward the Lord García in Pamplona and in [Deyo]." Upon his death in 932 or 933 his nephew, now García Sánchez I of Pamplona, ruled alone under the tutelage of his mother Toda, who was doubly Jimeno's sister-in-law.

== Marriage and children ==
Jimeno married Sancha Aznárez, daughter of Aznar Sánchez of Larraun and granddaughter of king Fortún Garcés, and thus a sister of Sancho's queen, Toda Aznárez. As such, she was a close kinswoman of Abd-ar-Rahman III. Sancha and Jimeno had three children: García, who went with his mother to Gascony; Sancho, who married Quissilo, daughter of García, count in Bailo; and Dadildis, wife of Muza Aznar, son of the wali of Huesca, al-Tawil, and grandson of Aznar Galíndez II of Aragon. By a mistress Jimeno had another son, also named García, who died at Córdoba.

== Sources ==
- Cañada Juste, Alberto (1980). "Los Banu Qasi (714–924)". Príncipe de Viana. 41 (158–59): 5–95. ISSN 0032-8472.
- Collins, Roger (1986). "Visigothic Law and Regional Custom in Disputes in Early Medieval Spain". In Wendy Davies; Paul Fouracre (eds.). The Settlement of Disputes in Early Medieval Europe. Cambridge University Press. pp. 85–104, 252–258.
- Collins, Roger (1990). The Basques. London: Blackwell. ISBN 9780631175650.
- Collins, Roger (2012). Caliphs and Kings: Spain, 796–1031. London: Wiley Blackwell. ISBN 978-1-118-73001-0.
- Lacarra, José María (1945). "Textos navarros del Códice de Roda". Estudios de Edad Media de la Corona de Aragón. 1: 193–284. OCLC 694519776.
- Ubieto Arteta, Antonio (1963). "Los reyes pamploneses entre 905 y 970". Príncipe de Viana. 24 (90): 77–82.

Preceded by Sancho I	King of Pamplona; 925–932/3	Succeeded by García Sánchez I
