= Sancha Sánchez =

Princess of Pamplona (d. 960)

Sancha

Queen consort of León
- Tenure: 923–4
- Died: 960
- Burial: Collegiate church of Covarrubias, Burgos
- Spouse: Ordoño II of León; Álvaro Herraméliz; Fernán González of Castile
- Issue: García Fernández of Castile; Urraca Fernández
- Father: Sancho I of Pamplona
- Mother: Toda of Pamplona

Sancha Sánchez of Pamplona (died 960) was an infanta of the kingdom of Pamplona who made three politically significant marriages in medieval Spain, most notably to Fernán González of Castile. She is commemorated in ballads about Fernán, where she is depicted as rescuing him from his imprisonments during his disputes with the king of León.

== Life ==
Sancha was the third child of King Sancho I of Pamplona and the queen Toda Aznárez.

Her first marriage, in 923, was to King Ordoño II of León. She was his third wife, as he had recently repudiated his second. This marriage was part of a network of alliances between Pamplona and León: for example, Sancha's stepsons with Ordoño, Alfonso IV and Ramiro II, married her sisters, Oneca and Urraca. Sancha was young, while Ordoño was about fifty years old. He died in 924.

Canon law in León required royal widows to enter a convent, but Sancha instead married again to one of Ordoño's magnates, Count Álvaro Herramélliz. They had a son, Herramel Álvarez. Her second husband died during the civil war of 931–2.

In 932/3, at the instigation of her mother, she married Fernán González, in a match which created ties between Fernán and the monarchies of León (where her sister Oneca was queen) and Pamplona. Her name appears confirming charters alongside her husband in the 930s. They had several children who went on to be politically active, including Gonzalo, Sancho, Munio, García Fernandez, Urraca Fernandez, and Muniadona Fernandez.

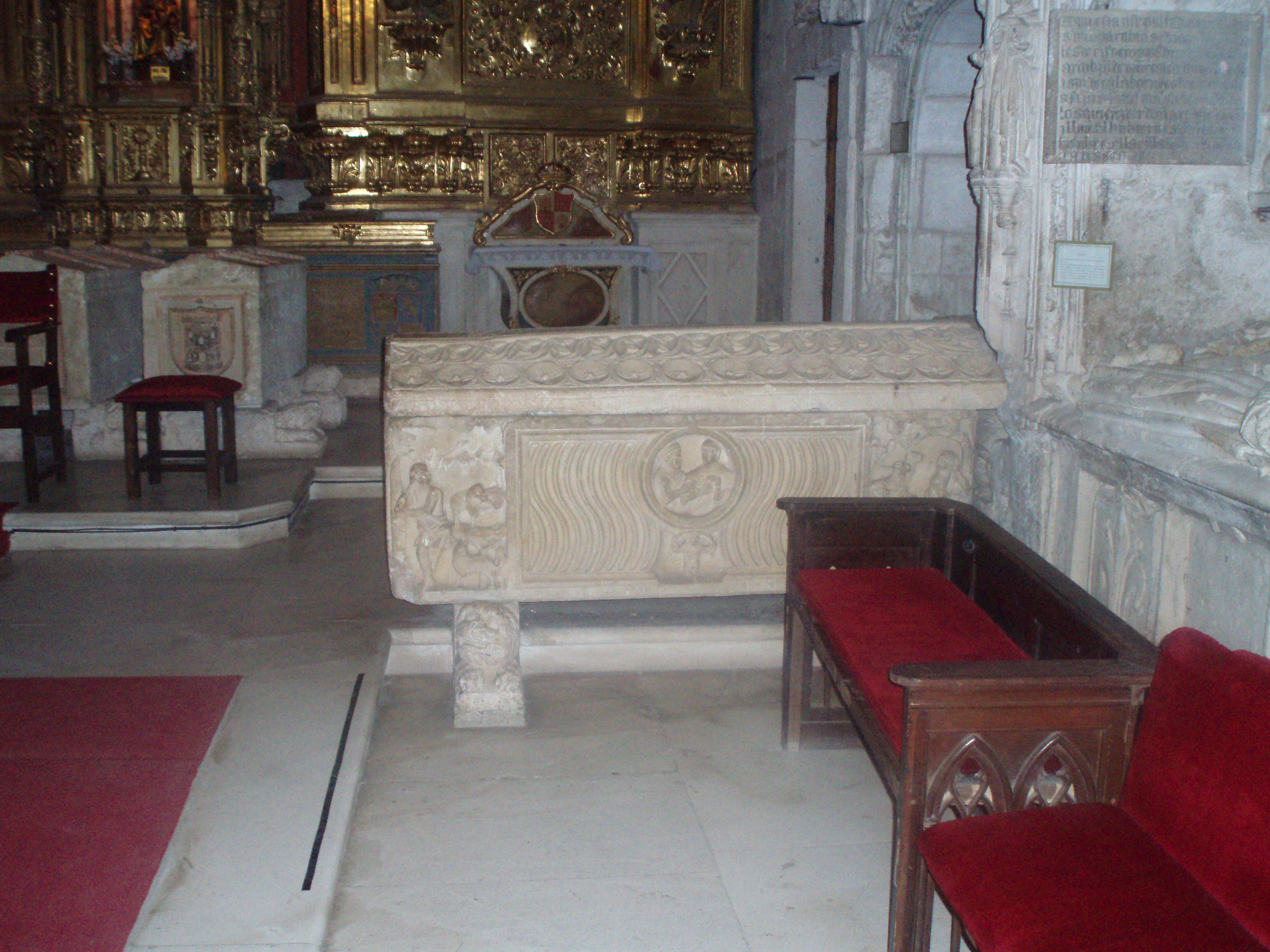
Sancha's tomb in the Collegiate Church of Covarrubias

She died in 960. Fernán later married her niece, Urraca Garcés.

== Legacy ==
Sancha is mentioned in ballads about Fernán González such as the Poema de Fernán González. She is depicted as a loyal wife who intervenes to rescue him from his imprisonments. The ‘Doña Sancha’ of the poem is a conflation of Fernán's two wives (she died before his second imprisonment).
