= Los Barrios de Luna =

Los Barrios de Luna, Spain
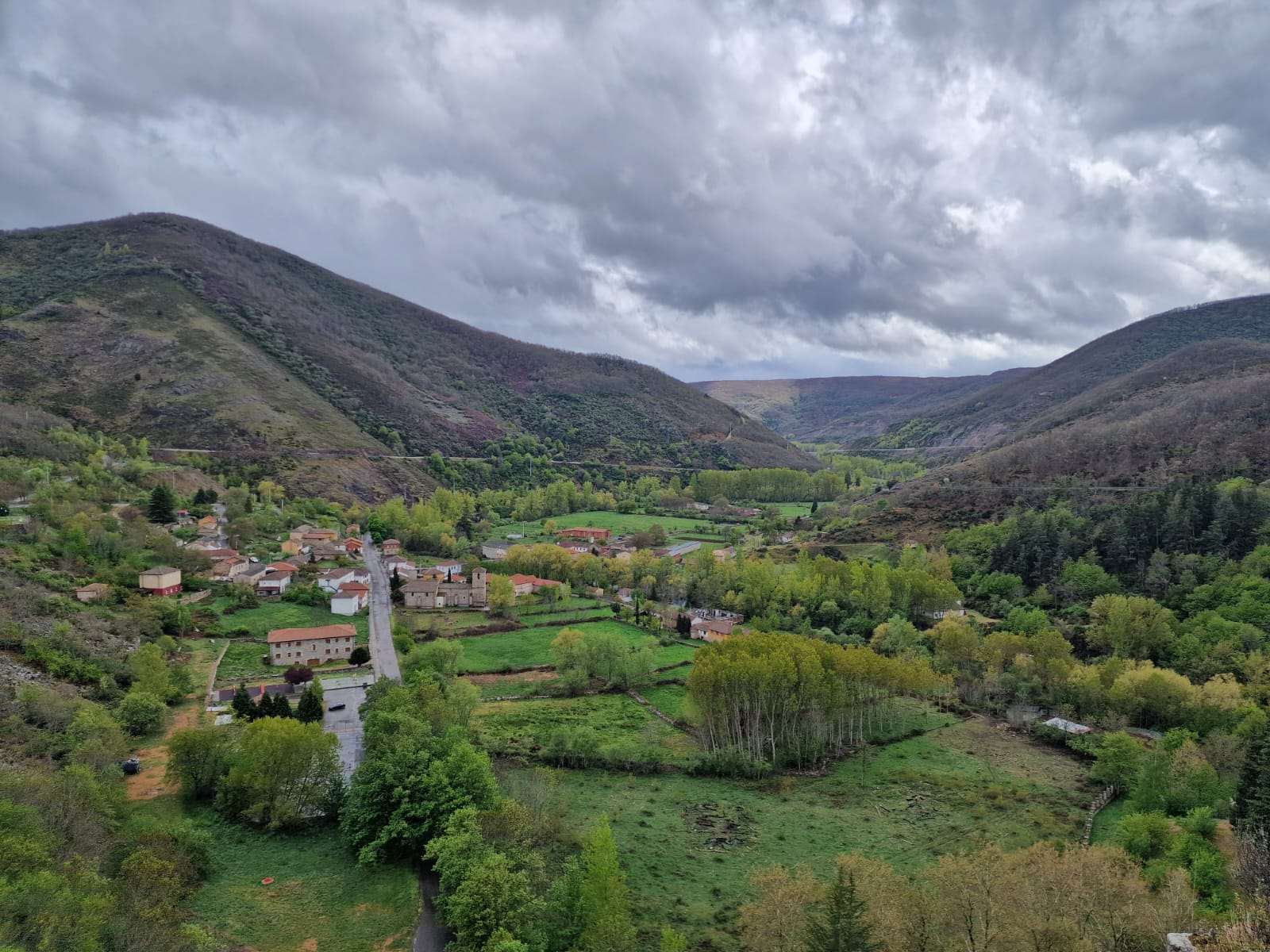

- Coat of arms

- Location within Spain
- Coordinates: 42°50′44″N 5°51′36″W
- Country: Spain
- Autonomous community: Castile and León
- Province: León
- Municipality: Los Barrios de Luna

Government
  - Mayor: Jesús Darío Suárez González (PP)

Area
  - Total: 94.29 km^{2} (36.41 sq mi)
- Elevation: 1,032 m (3,386 ft)

Population (2025-01-01)
  - Total: 300
  - Density: 3.2/km^{2} (8.2/sq mi)
- Time zone: UTC+1 (CET)
  - Summer (DST): UTC+2 (CEST)
- Postal Code: 24148
- Telephone prefix: 987

Los Barrios de Luna (Spanish pronunciation: [los ˈβarjos ðe ˈluna]) is a municipality located in the province of León, Castile and León, Spain. According to the 2010 census (INE), the municipality has a population of 309 inhabitants.
