= Teresa Ramírez =

Queen consort of Pamplona

Teresa of León
- Queen consort of Pamplona
- Spouse: García Sánchez I of Pamplona
- Issue: Ramiro Garcés of Viguera
- Father: Ramiro II of León
- Mother: Adosinda Gutiérrez

Teresa Ramírez (Theresa of León) was a Queen consort of Pamplona.

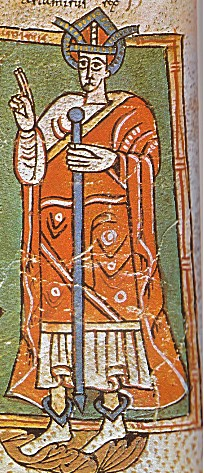
Teresa's child Ramiro

== Life ==
Teresa was a daughter of King Ramiro II of León and his cousin Adosinda Gutiérrez. Ramiro was an ally to King García Sánchez I of Pamplona, who was married to Teresa and the couple had son, Ramiro Garcés of Viguera.

It is suggested that while Teresa pushed for the disinheritance of García's eldest son Sancho II of Pamplona in favour of Ramiro, García compromised and willed the region of Viguera to Ramiro with the title of king.

García and Teresa appear together for the first time in 943 in a charter in the Monastery of San Millán de Suso.
