= García Jiménez of Pamplona =

9th century King of Pamplona

García
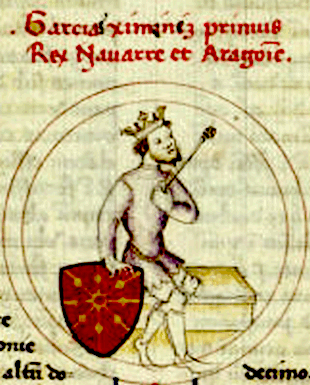
- Spouse: Onneca Rebelle of Sancosa, Dadildis of Pallars
- Issue: Sancho I Jimeno Garcés
- Father: Jimeno of Pamplona

García Jiménez was (sub- or co-) king of a part of Pamplona in the late 9th century, son of a supposed Jimeno.

The Jiménez dynasty that would later rule the Kingdom of Navarre originally held the territory within that realm distinct from that held by the descendants of Iñigo Arista. García is presumed to have succeeded his father in this role, either during the lifetime of King García Íñiguez or of his son King Fortún Garcés, and is called "king" by the Códice de Roda, being of "another part of the kingdom" of Pamplona.

There is no documentary evidence of García Jiménez playing any role in the government of the greater kingdom. However, such a role has been assigned to him. In 860, Fortún Garcés son and heir of king García Íñiguez, was imprisoned in Córdoba, and was kept there for 20 years. The traditional death date of García Íñiguez in 870 would have meant there was a de facto 10-year interregnum before the return of Fortún to the kingdom. It has been suggested that García Jiménez was called 'king' due to his service as regent during this period, lasting until he was killed at Aybar (882) in a battle against the Emir of Córdoba. On this basis, he is sometimes called García II. However, an alternative reconstruction would make the 882 casualties identical to García Íñiguez himself, thus allowing him to survive past his son's return, in which case no interregnum existed. There are likewise several references to a Sancho (presumably the son of García Íñiguez and younger brother of captive Fortún) being lord of Pamplona or 'king' in the 860s and 870s.

The Códice de Roda shows García Jiménez to have married twice, firstly to Oneca, "Rebel of Sangüesa" with whom he had two children:

- Íñigo, called 'king' in the Códice de Roda when reporting his marriage to a granddaughter of Fortún Garcés of Pamplona, but not in his own entry as son of García Jiménez. He perhaps succeeded to his father's sub-kingdom (else the term is being used as an honorific rather than a title).
- Sancha, married as her first husband Íñigo Fortúnez, son of king Fortún Garcés of Pamplona, and subsequently remarried to Galindo Aznárez II, Count of Aragon.

García Jiménez married secondly Dadildis of Pallars, sister of count Raymond I of Pallars and Ribagorza, having by her two sons:

- Sancho I, later sole king of Pamplona.
- Jimeno, tutor of his nephew García Sánchez and regent until his death on 29 May 931.

Preceded by perhaps Jimeno	Co- or Sub-king in Pamplona	Succeeded by perhaps Íñigo Garcés
