= Ramiro II of León =

King of León from 931 to 951

Ramiro II
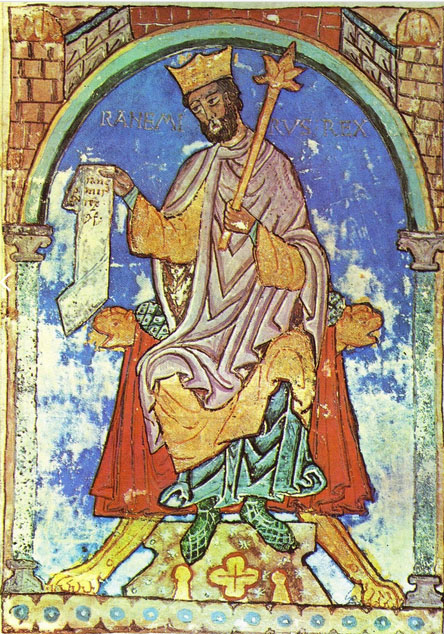
- Miniature from the Tumbo A manuscript, c. 1129–1255

King of León
- Reign: 931–951
- Predecessor: Alfonso IV
- Successor: Ordoño III
- Born: c. 900
- Died: 1 January 951 (aged 50–51); León
- Burial: Basilica of San Isidoro
- Consort: Adosinda Gutiérrez; Urraca of Pamplona
- Issue: Bermudo; Ordoño III; Teresa Ramírez; Sancho I Elvira
- Dynasty: Astur-Leonese dynasty
- Father: Ordoño II of León
- Mother: Elvira Menéndez
- Religion: Chalcedonian Christianity

Ramiro II (c. 900 – 1 January 951), son of Ordoño II and Elvira Menendez, was a King of León from 931 until his death. Initially titular king only of a lesser part of the kingdom, he gained the crown of León (and with it, Galicia) after supplanting his brother Alfonso IV and cousin Alfonso Fróilaz in 931. The scant Anales castellanos primeros are a primary source for his reign.

He actively campaigned against the Moors, who referred to him as the Devil due to his ferocity and fervor in battle. He defeated the hosts of the Umayyad caliph, Abd al-Rahman III, at the Battle of Simancas (939).

== Succession ==
When, shortly before his death in 910, Alfonso III of Asturias was forced by his sons to abdicate, the Kingdom of Asturias descended into a period of successional crises among the royal family and their supporters from the regional marcher aristocracies. The kingdom was initially partitioned, with García I receiving León, Ordoño II Galicia and Fruela II the Asturian heartland.

With the successive deaths of García I (914) and Ordoño (924), these were re-consolidated, Fruela ruling the entirety of what would thenceforth be referred to as the Kingdom of León. His death the next year, 925, again brought about disputed succession and partition. A younger brother, Ramiro, appears to have married Fruela's widow and adopted the royal title, but gained no traction. Instead it was the next generation that rose to the forefront.

As eldest son of the prior king, Alfonso Fróilaz was crowned but proved unable to extend his power to the entire kingdom and was marginalized by his cousins the three sons of Ordoño II, who had the backing of the Kingdom of Pamplona. These brothers again partitioned the portion of the kingdom they controlled: the eldest, Sancho Ordóñez, ruling in Galicia, Alfonso IV in León, and Ramiro II in the newly conquered lands to the south (al-Andalus chronicler Ibn Hayyan located his court at Coimbra).

When Sancho died in 929 his kingdom was absorbed by Alfonso IV, but in a quick succession of events taking place in Leon and Zamora, Ramiro forced the abdication of Alfonso IV, and had him and Fruela II's three sons blinded in order to make them incapable of ruling.

== Reign ==
Ramiro stood out as an excellent military commander, and expanded his territories south to a remarkable extent (e.g., into Salamanca and Ledesma) as well as founding or repopulating frontier strongholds (e.g., Osma, Clunia). Ramiro masterminded a Pamplona/León coalition that defeated a joint Andalusian counter-offensive in the Battle of Simancas (939). This victory allowed the advance of the Leonese border of the Duero to the Tormes.

In the last years of his reign, he lost the support of his Pamplona brother-in-law/son-in-law García Sánchez I, who then helped another brother-in-law, the count Fernán González of Castile, to gain brief de facto independence. Still in 950 Ramiro launched an expedition to the valley of the Edge and defeated the Cordovan Umayyads at Talavera.

== Family ==
Ramiro II married twice. His first wife was a member of the Galician nobility and his first cousin, Adosinda Gutiérrez, daughter of Gutier Osóriz and Ildonzia Menéndez (a sister of Ramiro's mother, queen Elvira Menéndez, and also aunt of San Rosendo). Ramiro's second marriage to Urraca Sánchez of Pamplona, daughter of Sancho I of Pamplona and Toda, brought him an alliance with Pamplona. By Adosinda, Ramiro had at least two sons, the poorly-documented Bermudo who died during his father's lifetime, and Ordoño III, Ramiro's successor, plus presumably also a daughter, Teresa, the second queen of García Sánchez I of Pamplona. (Note: García is referred to as Ramiro's son-in-law by chronicler Ibn Hayyan, and García and Teresa's eldest son was named Ramiro, suggesting this was the wife of García who was Ramiro II's daughter. A daughter of Ramiro by his second wife would have been García's niece, making Asodinda, the first wife, the more likely to have been mother of Teresa.) By Urraca, Ramiro had two children, Sancho I of León and Elvira Ramírez. These marriages would set the stage for further succession conflict, with Ordoño and his son Vermudo II supported by the Galician nobility, while Elvira, Sancho and his son Ramiro III relied on support from Urraca's relatives in Pamplona and Córdoba.

Ramiro figures prominently in the romantic poem, the Miragaia, which tells the apocryphal story of Ramiro bedding Ortega, the daughter of a local Arab lord. By her he is given a son Aboazar, the progenitor of the Galician/Portuguese Maia family. (Note: While this Maia founder is a historical individual, contemporary documents indicate his father was named Lovesendo.) This Maia tradition was subsequently linked to another legend, that told in the Cantar de los Siete Infantes de Lara by giving Ramiro and Ortega a daughter Ortega Ramírez, who is made to marry Gustios Gonzalez, grandfather of the legendary infantes and of that tale's hero, Mudarra González. Subsequent elaboration of this legend gave further supposed descendants among the Lara family, but these Lara connections are dismissed by modern scholars.

== Sources ==
- Barton, Simon; Fletcher, Richard, eds. (2013). The World of El Cid: Chronicles of the Spanish Reconquest. Manchester University Press.
- Collins, Roger (1983). Early Medieval Spain. New York: St. Martin's Press. ISBN 0-312-22464-8.

Ramiro II of León Astur-Leonese dynasty Born: circa 900 Died: 1 January 951
Regnal titles
Preceded by Alfonso IV	King of León; 931–951	Succeeded by Ordoño III
