= Urraca Sánchez of Pamplona =

10th-century Queen of León

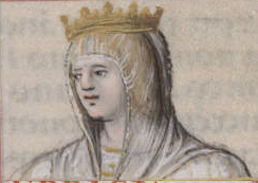
Queen Urraca, as depicted in the 16th-century Liber genealogiae regum Hispanie.

Urraca Sánchez (fl. first half of the 10th century CE) was an Infanta of Pamplona and Queen consort of León.

== Family ==
Urraca was a daughter of Sancho I, King of Pamplona and his wife Toda of Navarre, and sister of García Sánchez I of Pamplona. She was the second wife of king Ramiro II of León, by him having two known children, Sancho I of León (a future king) and Elvira Ramírez (a future regent).
