= Villamayor de Monjardín =

Municipality of Spain

Coordinates: 42°37′59″N 2°6′0″W

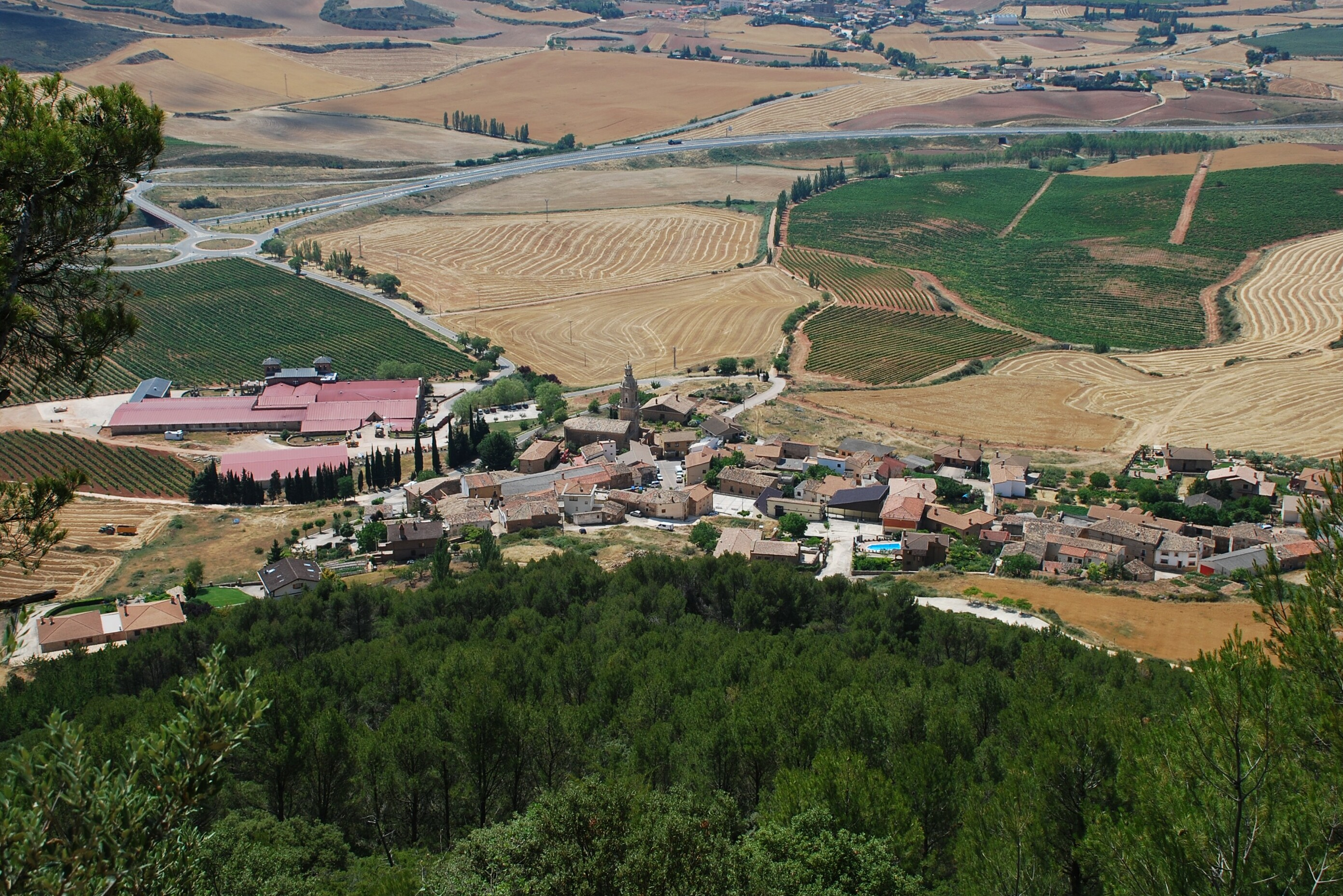
View of Villamayor de Monjardín

Villamayor de Monjardín (very exceptionally in Basque: Deio) is a town and municipality located in the province and the autonomous community of Navarre, northern Spain.

The ruins of the castle of San Esteban de Deyo sit on the hill above the town.
