= García Íñiguez =

King of Pamplona from 851/2 to 870

García Iñiguez
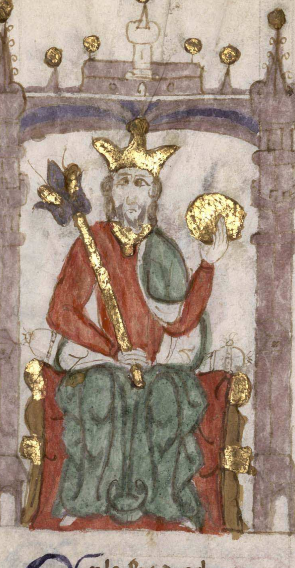
- Depiction in the Castilian manuscript Compendium of Chronicles of Kings, c. 1312–1325

King of Pamplona
- Reign: 851/852 – 870/882
- Predecessor: Íñigo Arista
- Successor: Fortún Garcés
- Born: c. 810
- Died: 870/882
- Burial: Monastery of Leyre
- Consort: Urraca
- Issue more...: Fortún Garcés
- House: House of Íñiguez
- Father: Íñigo Arista

García Íñiguez I (Latin: Garsea Enneconis, Basque: Gartzea Eneko; c. 810 – 870/882), also known as García I, was the second king of Pamplona from 851–2 until his death. He was the son of Íñigo Arista, the first king of Pamplona. Educated in Cordoba, he was a successful military leader who led the military campaigns of the kingdom during the last years of his father's life.

== Biography ==
Educated in Córdoba, as a guest at the court of the Emir of Córdoba, García was the son of Íñigo Arista, the first king of a Basque dynasty ruling in Pamplona up to the late 9th century. When his father was stricken by paralysis in 842, he became regent of the kingdom (or perhaps co-regent with his uncle Fortún Íñiguez). He and his kinsman Mūsā ibn Mūsā ibn Fortún of the Banu Qasi rebelled against the Cordoban emir in 843. This rebellion was put down by Emir Abd ar-Rahman II, who attacked the Kingdom of Pamplona, defeating García badly and killing Fortún. At his father's death in 851/2 (237 A.H.), he succeeded to the crown of Pamplona.

Following the death of Íñigo Arista, the Banu Qasi leader Mūsā ibn Mūsā pursued a policy of closer allegiance with Muhammad I of Córdoba, leaving García to look to Catholic Asturias for an ally. In 859, the Vikings captured García, probably far removed from his Basque kingdom of Navarre, somewhere in the Andalusian heartland, and extorted a hefty ransom, rising to around 70,000 gold dinars. Later the same year, Mūsā ibn Mūsā attacked the Pamplonese city of Albelda. García and his new friend Ordoño I of Asturias together dealt Mūsā a crushing blow, killing, it is said, 10,000 of his magnates in the Battle of Albelda. This, in turn, provoked a raid by Mohammed I of Córdoba in response and the next year, 860, saw García's son and heir Fortún captured and imprisoned by Mohammed I of Córdoba.

He languished in Córdoba for the next 20 years. In 870, García formed an alliance with the Muslim rebel Amrus ibn Umar ibn Amrus (grandson of Amrūs ibn Umar ibn Amrūs), who had killed Garcia's nephew Mūsā ibn Galindo of Huesca, and the next year was apparently in a new alliance with the sons of Mūsā ibn Mūsā, now in rebellion against Córdoba.

García's death has been subject to scholarly dispute, a result of a paucity of records from the last years of his reign. The lack of subsequent mention of him after 870 led to the suggestion that he died in that year, while his eldest son and heir was in the hands of his enemies, it was argued that García Jiménez governed the kingdom as regent. García's son, Fortún Garcés, is then made to succeed upon his release in 880. There is, however, no evidence for such a regency, and Sanchéz Albornoz has cited evidence that García was still living at the time of his son's return. Thus it is likely that Balparda was reporting an accurate tradition when he suggested García and ally Umar ibn Hafsun fought a battle at Aibar, not far from present-day Lumbier, against the troops of the Emir of Córdoba in 882, García dying there (although the age provided him, 84 years, is clearly exaggerated).

== Marriage and descendants ==
The identity of García's wife or wives is poorly documented, and has been subject to much speculation. An undated confirmation of an earlier lost charter refers to King García and Queen Urraca Mayor, and this is thought by some to refer to García Íñiguez and an otherwise unknown wife, Urraca. Based on her name alone and the fact that one of his sons' names was Fortún, a common name among the Banu Qasi dynasty (but also that of García's paternal uncle), it has been argued that Urraca could have been a granddaughter of Musa ibn Musa al-Qasawi, the leader of the Banu Qasi clan. Other historians have suggested alternative parentage, or suggested the document does not refer to García Íñiguez at all but instead to García Sánchez II of Pamplona and his mother Queen Urraca Fernández. A second possible wife is infanta Leodegundia, daughter of Ordoño I of Asturias. She is known to have married a ruler of Pamplona not named in the primary source, and García Íñiguez is one of those speculated to have been this prince.

- Fortún Garcés, king of Pamplona from 870 until 905 and married to Auria.
- Onneca Garcés, married to Count Aznar Galíndez II of Aragon.
- Sancho Garcés, father of Aznar Sánchez de Larraun — the second husband of his cousin Onneca Fortúnez — and probably of Velazquita, who married Mutarrif ibn Musa, of the Banu Qasi. (Note: Chronicler Ibn Hayyan says Velasquita was daughter of king García Íñiguez, but al-Udri names her father as Sancho, lord of Pamplona. The latter has been preferred by historians. This reference to Sancho as 'lord', along with a reference by Ibn Khaldun to a Sancho, 'governor of Pamplona and chief of the Basques' in 865, and an 867 charter that names 'king' Sancho as son-in-law of Galindo Aznárez I of Aragón, led Antonio Ubieto Arteta to propose that it was Sancho Garcés who ruled in Pamplona in the mid-to-late 860s, during at least part of the period that his brother, Fortún Garcés, was held captive in Córdoba.)

He may also have been the father of Jimena, who married King Alfonso III of Asturias between 26 May and 20 December 873, both appearing together for first time in 874 making a donation to the Cathedral of Santiago de Compostela. Her name and the status of her husband as the premier monarch in Catholic Iberia suggests that she could have come from nothing short of the highest levels of Pamplona society, though some have instead derived her from the Jimenez dynasty.

== Sources ==
- Barrau-Dihigo, Lucien (1900). "Les origines du royaume de Navarre d'apres une théorie récente". Revue Hispanique (in French). 7 (21–22): 141–222. ISSN 9965-0355.
- Cañada Juste, Alberto (1980). "Los Banu Qasi (714–924)". Príncipe de Viana (in Spanish) (Year 41): 5–95. ISSN 0032-8472.
- Carriedo Tejedo, Manuel (1993–1994). "Nacimiento, matrimonio y muerte de Alfonso III el Magno" (PDF). Asturiensia Medievalia (in Spanish) (7). Oviedo: 129–145. ISSN 0301-889X.
- Collins, Roger (2012). Caliphs and Kings: Spain, 796–1031. Blackwell Publishing.
- Collins, Roger (1990). The Basques (2nd ed.). Oxford, UK: Basil Blackwell. ISBN 0631175652.
- Collins, Roger (1995). MacKitteric, Rosamund (ed.). The New Cambridge Medieval History. Cambridge: Cambridge University Press. ISBN 9780521362924.
- García Gómez, Emilio; Lévi-Provençal, Évariste (1954). "Textos inéditos del Muqtabis de Ibn Hayyan sobre los orígines del Reino de Pamplona". Al-Andalus (in Spanish). 19 (2): 295–316. ISSN 0304-4335.
- Gibb, H.A.R. (1986). The Encyclopaedia of Islam. Vol. I. Coauthors: Kramers, J.H.; Levi-Provençal, E.; Schacht, J. Brill. ISBN 9789004081147.
- Lacarra de Miguel, José María (1945). "Textos navarros del Códice de Roda" (PDF). Estudios de Edad Media de la Corona de Aragón. 1: 193–284. OCLC 694519776. Archived from the original (PDF) on 2016-03-03.
- Lévi-Provençal, Évariste (1953). "Du nouveau sur le royaume de Pampelune au IXe siècle". Bulletin Hispanique (in French). 55 (1). Université de Bordeaux: 5–22. doi:10.3406/hispa.1953.3340. ISSN 0007-4640.
- Martínez Díez, Gonzalo (2007). Sancho III el Mayor Rey de Pamplona, Rex Ibericus (in Spanish). Madrid: Marcial Pons Historia. ISBN 978-84-96467-47-7.
- Pérez de Urbel, Justo (1954). "Lo viejo y lo nuevo sobre el origin del Reino de Pamplona". Al-Andalus (in Spanish). 19 (1): 1–42. ISSN 0304-4335.
- Salazar y Acha, Jaime de (2006). "Urraca. Un nombre egregio en la onomástica altomedieval". En la España medieval (in Spanish) (1): 29–48. ISSN 0214-3038.
- Sánchez Albornoz, Claudio (1959). "Problemas de la historia Navarra del siglo IX" (PDF). Príncipe de Viana (in Spanish) (20): 5–62. ISSN 0032-8472.
- Ubieto Arteta, Antonio (1967). "¿Un nuevo rey pamplonés para el siglo IX?". Príncipe de Viana (in Spanish). 28 (108–109): 289–292. ISSN 0032-8472.

Preceded by Íñigo Arista	King of Pamplona; 851/2–882	Succeeded by Fortún Garcés
