= Fortún Garcés of Pamplona =

King of Pamplona from 870/882 to 905

Fortún

King of Pamplona
- Reign: 870/882–905
- Predecessor: García Íñiguez
- Successor: Sancho Garcés
- Died: 922; Monastery of Leyre
- Burial: Monastery of Leyre
- Consort: Auria
- Issue four others...: Onneca Fortúnez
- House: House of Íñiguez
- Father: García Íñguez
- Mother: Urraca

Fortún Garcés (Basque: Orti Gartzez; died 922) nicknamed the One-eyed (el Tuerto), and years later the Monk (el Monje), was king of Pamplona from 870/882 until 905. He appears in Arabic records as Fortoûn ibn Garsiya (فرتون بن غرسية). He was the eldest son of García Iñíguez and grandson of Íñigo Arista, the first king of Pamplona. Reigning for about thirty years, Fortún Garcés would be the last king of the Íñiguez dynasty.

== Biography ==
Fortún was born at an unknown date, being the eldest son of García Íñiguez, king of Pamplona, and his consort Urraca, who could have been the granddaughter of Musa ibn Musa al-Qasawi, the leader of the Banu Qasi clan. Little is known about his early life.

King García Íñiguez had worked towards a closer relationship with the Kingdom of Asturias, distancing himself and his kingdom from the Banu Qasi dynasty that ruled the lands near the Ebro river. He was involved in repeated armed conflicts with the Muslim forces of the Banu Qasi, and Emir Muhammad I of Córdoba, who invaded Pamplona in the year 860 and captured Fortún in Milagro, along with his daughter Onneca and took them hostages in Córdoba. The wali of Zaragoza, Muhammad ibn Lubb, besieged and ultimately destroyed the castle of Aibar, resulting in the death of the King García Íñiguez. After the death of his father, Fortún Garcés was allowed to return to Pamplona to take his place as king. Fortún Garcés reigned with a policy very accommodating to the wishes of the Banu Qasi clan, which caused anger within the Pamplonese nobility. He would frequently retire to the Monastery of Leyre.

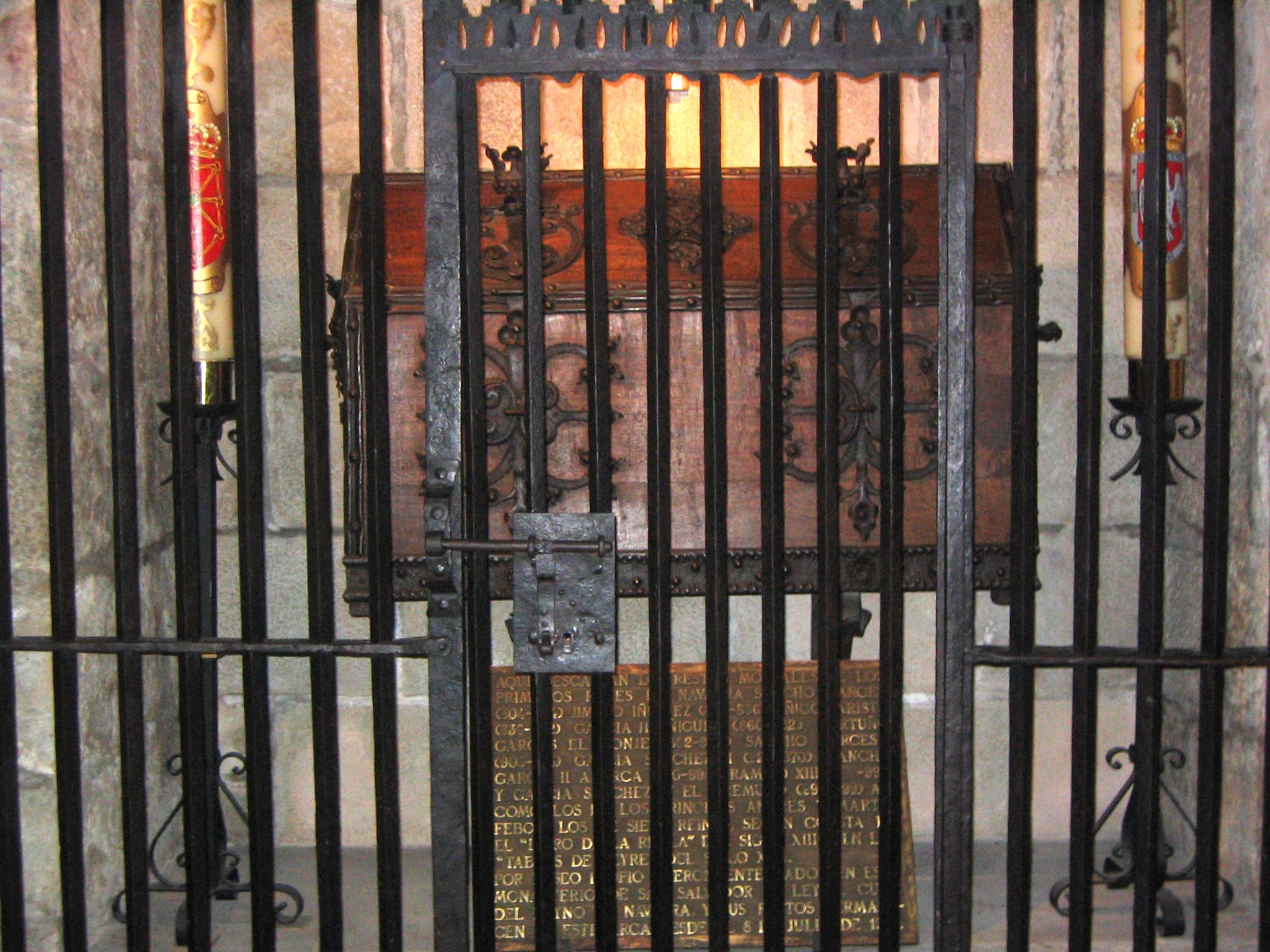
Royal pantheon in the Monastery of Leyre

A drastic change took place in 905, when Sancho Garcés was chosen by the Pamplonese nobility to replace Fortún Garcés as king. The reasons behind this decision reside in the fact that Sancho Garcés had a very well respected military prestige and had the support of important figures such as Count Raymond I of Pallars and Ribagorza, Count Galindo Aznárez II of Aragon and King Alfonso III of Asturias.

Fortún Garcés permanently retired to the Monastery of Leyre in 905, where he died in 922.

== Marriage and descendants ==
Fortún was married to Auria, whose undocumented origin has been subject to conflicting speculation, to whom the Códice de Roda assigns the following children:

- Íñigo Fortúnez, married to Sancha Garcés, daughter of García Jiménez of Pamplona and Onecca 'rebel of Sancosa'.
- Aznar Fortúnez; little is known about him.
- Velasco Fortúnez, who had three children: Jimena, wife of Íñigo Garcés, son of García Jiménez of Pamplona.
- Lope Fortúnez
- Onneca Fortúnez, according to the Códice de Roda first married to Abdullah ibn Muhammad al-Umawi of Córdoba and later to Aznar Sánchez of Larraun, with whom she had three children, including Queens Toda and Sancha of Pamplona. However, the order of Onneca's marriages has been questioned, as has the identity of Fortún's daughter as the Onneca who married Abdullah.

== Sources ==
- Cañada Juste, Alberto (2013). "Doña Onneca, una princesa vascona en la corte de los emires cordobeses" (PDF). Príncipe de Viana (in Spanish) (258 (Separata)). Gobierno de Navarra: 481–501. ISSN 0032-8472.
- Collins, Roger (2012). Caliphs and Kings: Spain, 796-1031. Blackwell publishing.
- Kosto, Adam J. (2017). "Aragon and the Catalan Counties Before the Union". In Sabaté, Flocel (ed.). The Crown of Aragon: A Singular Mediterranean Empire. Brill. pp. 70–91.
- Martínez Díez, Gonzalo (2007). Sancho III el Mayor Rey de Pamplona, Rex Ibericus (in Spanish). Madrid: Marcial Pons Historia. ISBN 978-84-96467-47-7.
- Rei, António (2011–2012). "Descendência Hispânica do Profeta do Islão: Exploração de Algumas Linhas Primárias". Armas e Troféus (in Portuguese). Instituto Português de Heráldica.
- Salazar y Acha, Jaime de (2006). "Urraca. Un nombre egregio en la onomástica altomedieval". En la España medieval (in Spanish) (1): 29–48. ISSN 0214-3038.
- Settipani, Christian (2004). La noblesse du midi carolingien: études sur quelques grandes familles d'Aquitaine et du Languedoc du IXe siècle (in French). Oxford Univ. Unit for Prosopographical Research. ISBN 9781900934046.
- Menéndez Pidal, Ramón (1999). Historia de España, Tomo VII, Vol. 2, La España Cristiana de los Siglos VIII al IX (718 - 1035). Los Núcleos Pireneicos, Navarra, Aragón, Cataluña (in Spanish). Madrid: Editorial Espasa-Calpe. ISBN 84-239-8913-5.

Preceded by García Íñiguez	King of Pamplona; 882–905	Succeeded by Sancho Garcés I
