= Aznar Galíndez II =

Count of Aragon from 867 to 893

Aznar Galíndez II was the count of Aragon (867–893) as the son and successor of Galindo Aznárez I.

Aznar married Oneca, daughter of the king of Pamplona, Garcia Iñíguez, and had:

- Galindo Aznárez II
- García
- Sancha, wife of Muhammad al-Tawil, wali of Huesca

Aznar died in 893.

== Sources ==
- Kosto, Adam J. (2017). "Aragon and the Catalan Counties Before the Union". In Sabaté, Flocel (ed.). The Crown of Aragon: A Singular Mediterranean Empire. Brill. pp. 70–91.

Preceded by Galindo Aznárez I	Count of Aragon; 867–893	Succeeded by Galindo Aznárez II
