= Luco =

Luco may refer to:

- Luco dei Marsi, a town in Abruzzo, Italy
- Jardin du Luxembourg, a park in Paris, informally called "le Luco"
- Luco de Bordón, a town in Aragon, Spain

== People ==
- Luco (surname), with a list of people of this name
