= Maestrazgo (disambiguation) =

Maestrazgo may refer to:

- Maestrat (Spanish: Maestrazgo), an historic and natural region in the Spanish province of Castellón
  - Alt Maestrat, a comarca in the Spanish province of Castellón
  - Baix Maestrat, a comarca in the Spanish province of Castellón
- Maestrazgo, Aragon, a comarca in the Spanish province of Teruel, Aragon
