= Sierra de Caballos =

Mountain range in Spain

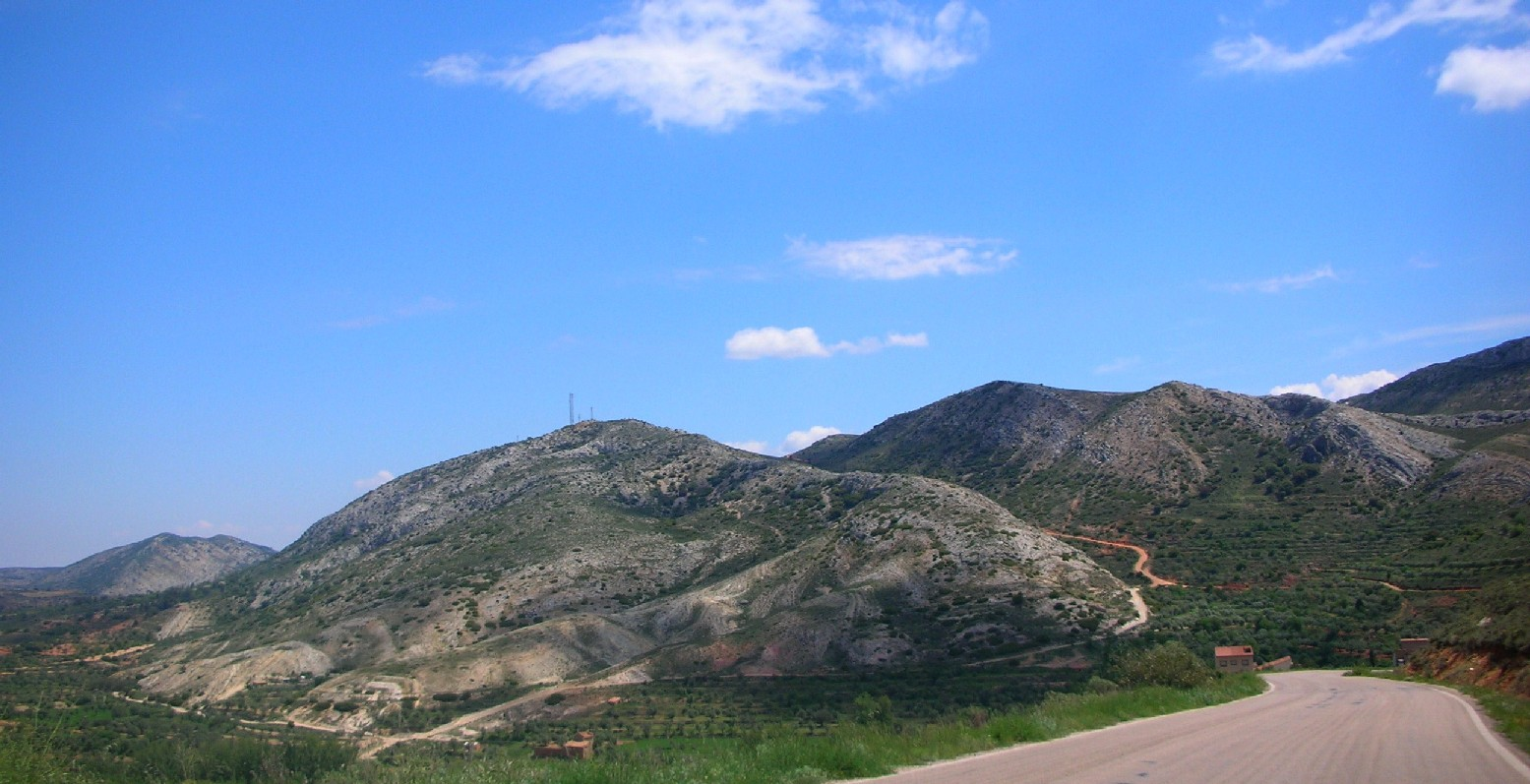
- Sierra de los Caballos between Molinos and Berge

Highest point
- Peak: Las Artigas
- Elevation: 1,205 m (3,953 ft)
- Listing: List of mountains in Aragon
- Coordinates: 40°49′57″N 0°25′26″W

Geography
- Location within Spain
- Location: Maestrazgo, Bajo Aragón, Aragon
- Parent range: Iberian System, Eastern zone

Geology
- Orogeny: Alpine orogeny
- Rock age: Mesozoic
- Rock type(s): dolomite and Marl

Climbing
- Easiest route: From the towns of Seno, Molinos or Berge

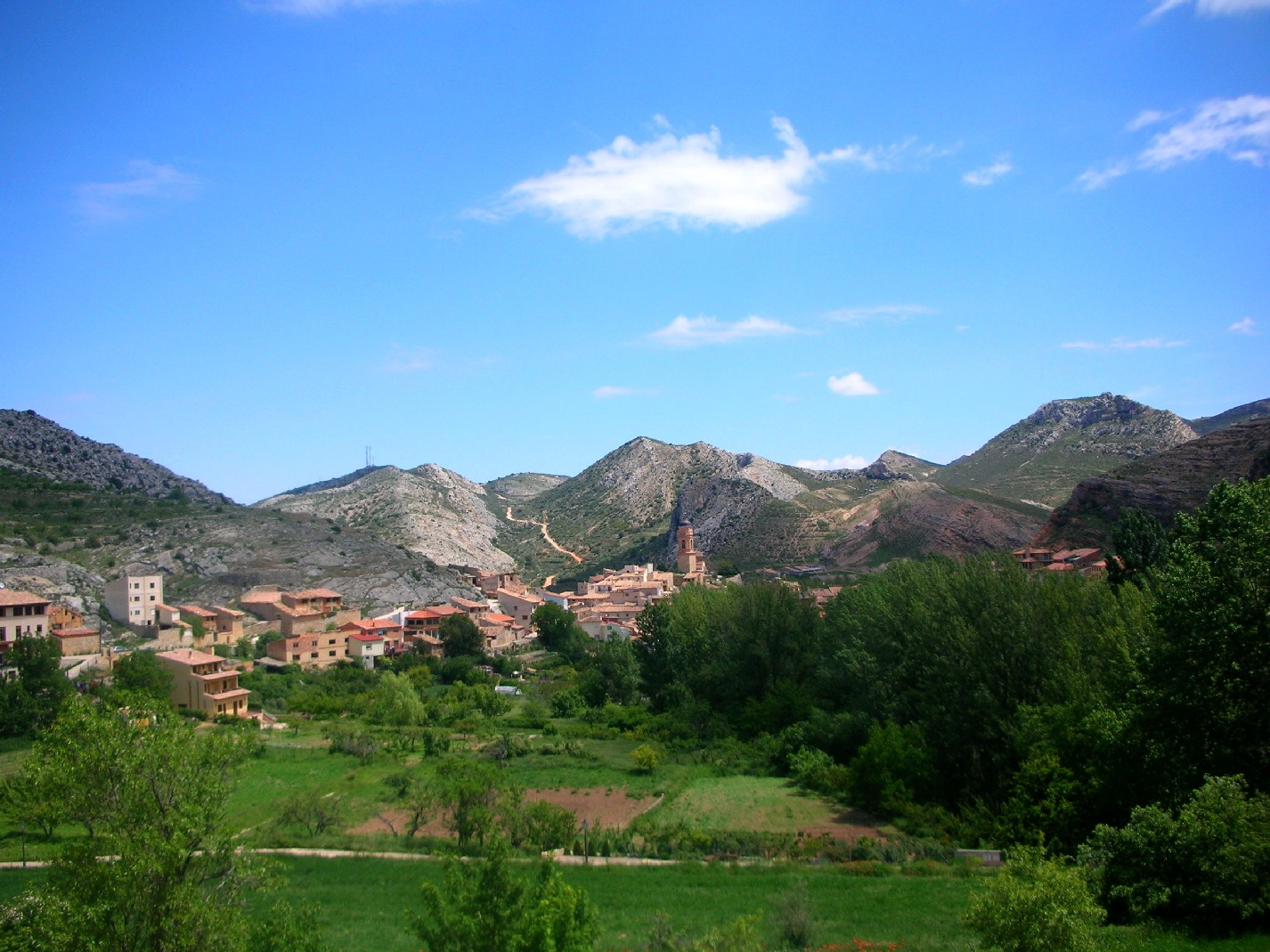
The arid-looking Sierra de Caballos range rising behind Molinos town

Sierra de Caballos or Sierra de los Caballos is a mountain range in the Maestrazgo and Bajo Aragón comarcas of Aragon, Teruel Province, Spain. The highest point in the range is Las Artigas (1,205 m). The Guadalopillo River flows along the northern side of the range.

== Geography ==
This arid-looking series of parallel ranges is cut by many ravines. It is located north of Castellote, at the eastern end of the Iberian System, roughly between Molinos and Berge. There are many fossils from the Jurassic and Cretaceous periods in this area.

The Ermita de la Virgen de la Peña near Berge, is in the northern side of the Sierra de Caballos. El Picuezo is an original rock formation near Molinos. The impressive Grutas de Cristal "glass caves" are located in the area of these mountains, within Molinos municipal term.

There are other mountain ranges with the name "Sierra de Caballos" in the world. One of them is in Isla de Pinos, Cuba.

== See also ==
- Maestrazgo, Aragon
