= Berge, Teruel =

Berge
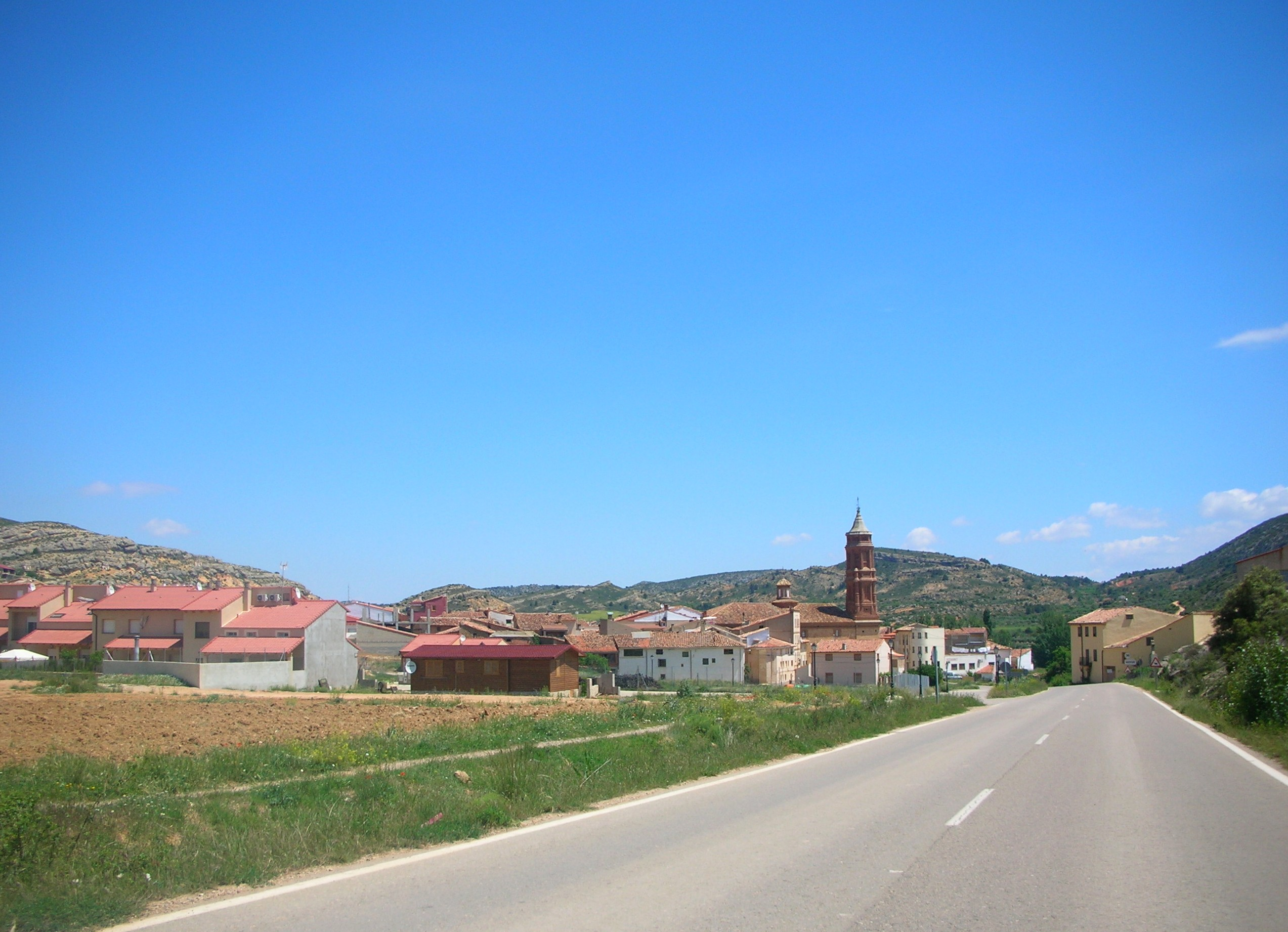

- Location within Spain
- Coordinates: 40°51′N 0°26′W
- Country: Spain
- Autonomous community: Aragon
- Province: Teruel
- Comarca: Bajo Aragón

Area
  - Total: 42.64 km^{2} (16.46 sq mi)
- Elevation: 718 m (2,356 ft)

Population (2025-01-01)
  - Total: 218
  - Density: 5.11/km^{2} (13.2/sq mi)
- Demonym(s): Bergelino, Bergelina
- Time zone: UTC+1 (CET)
  - Summer (DST): UTC+2 (CEST)
- Postal code: 44121

Berge is a little village and municipality in Bajo Aragón, Teruel Province, Aragon, Spain. According to the 2010 census the municipality has a population of 274 inhabitants.

The town is located at the edge of the mountainous Maestrazgo comarca. The Guadalopillo River flows through Berge and the Sierra de los Caballos, part of the eastern Sistema Ibérico, rises south of the town.

== See also ==
- Bajo Aragón
- Maestrazgo, Aragon
- List of municipalities in Teruel
