= Sierra Carrascosa =

Mountain range in Aragon, Teruel Province, Spain

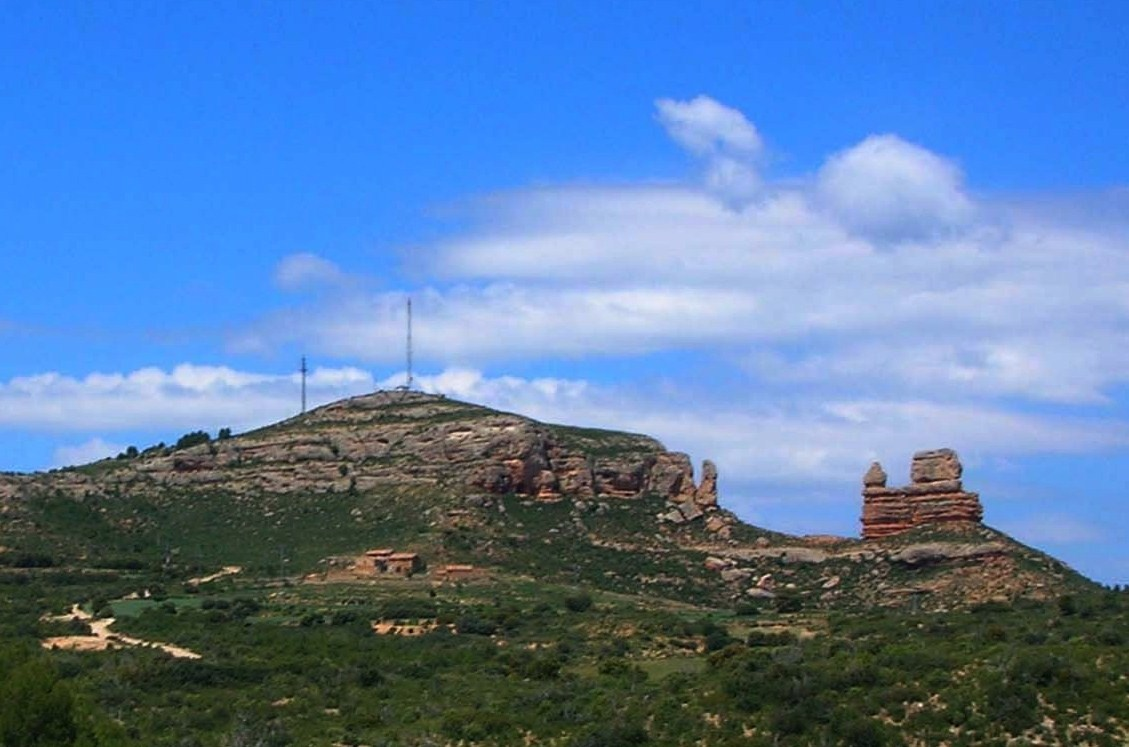
- NE end of Sierra Carrascosa with the Guerrero Romano rock formation

Highest point
- Elevation: 1,214 m (3,983 ft)
- Listing: List of mountains in Aragon
- Coordinates: 40°42′15″N 0°21′12″W

Geography
- Location within Spain
- Location: Maestrazgo. Aragon
- Parent range: Iberian System, Eastern zone

Geology
- Mountain type: Sandstone

Climbing
- Easiest route: From the towns of Villarluengo, Bordón or Castellote

Sierra Carrascosa is a mountain range in the Maestrazgo comarca of Aragon, Teruel Province, Spain. The highest point in the range is Muela Carrascosa (1,214 m). The Guadalope River flows along the NW side of the range.

== Geography ==
This 14 km long rocky range is located at the eastern end of the Iberian System and, like neighboring Sierra de Garrucha is characterized by very tight folds. Close to its northeastern end there is a very striking red rock formation known as El Guerrero Romano, "The Roman Soldier". It is a spectacular sight, very visible from A-226 road between Bordón and Castellote.

Villarluengo and Bordón are the most important towns in the vicinity of this range. The range is named after the Quercus coccifera spiny oak (Spanish: carrasca).

== See also ==
- Maestrazgo, Aragon
