= Villarroya de los Pinares =

Villarroya de los Pinares, Spain
- municipality
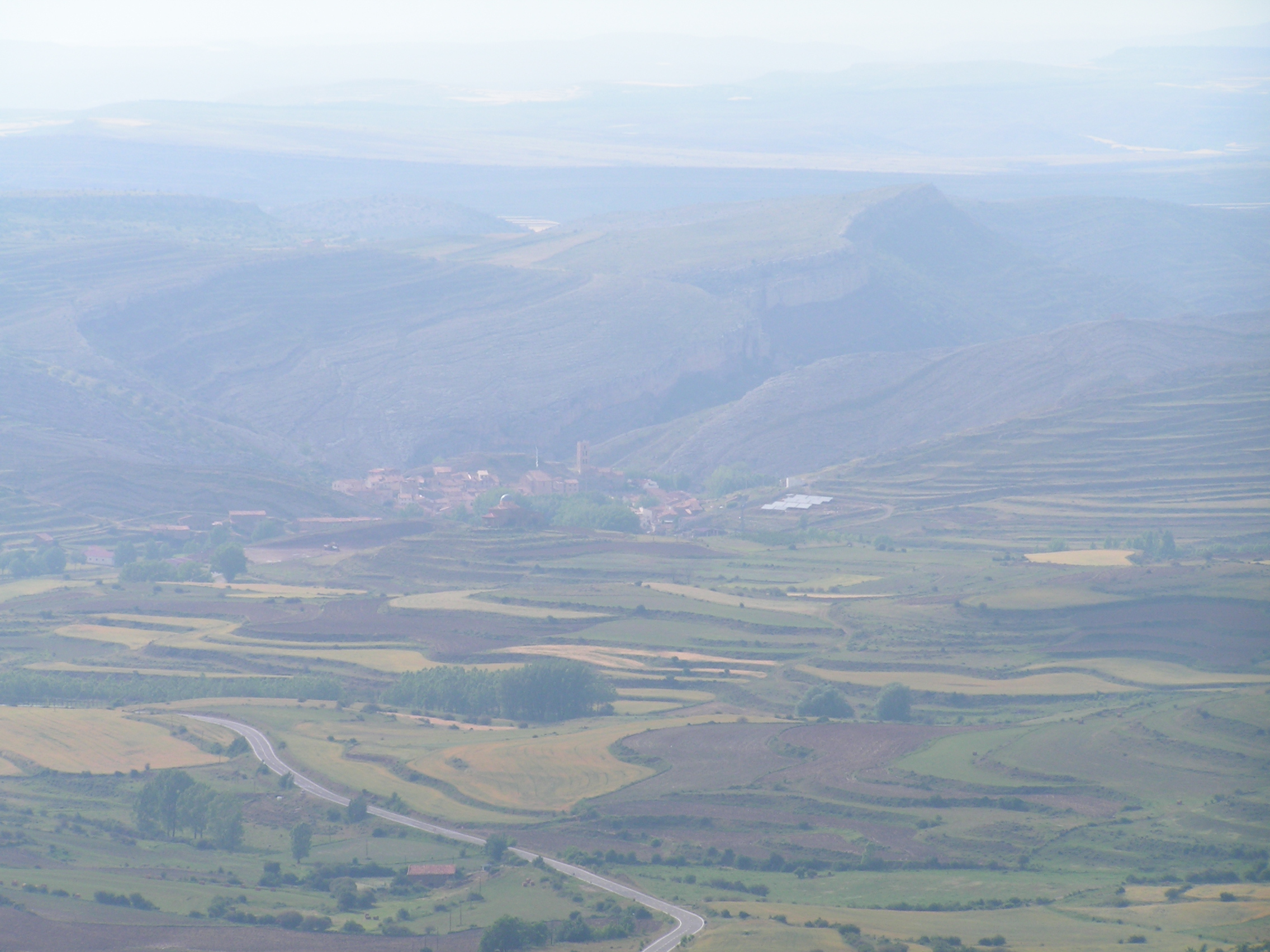
- Nickname: Villarroya
- Location within Spain
- Coordinates: 40°32′N 0°40′W
- Country: Spain
- Autonomous community: Aragon
- Province: Teruel
- Region: Maestrazgo

Area
  - Total: 66.41 km^{2} (25.64 sq mi)
- Elevation: 1,337 m (4,386 ft)

Population (2025-01-01)
  - Total: 160
  - Density: 2.4/km^{2} (6.2/sq mi)
- Time zone: UTC+1 (CET)
- Postal code: 44144
- Website: http://www.villarroyadelospinares.es

Villarroya de los Pinares is a municipality located in the Maestrazgo region, province of Teruel, Aragon, Spain. According to the 2004 census (INE), the municipality had a population of 190 inhabitants.

It is in the northern part of the Gúdar mountain range next to the Guadalope River at an altitude of 1,337 meters and at a distance of 51 km from the provincial capital, Teruel on the A-226 road.

== Local Policy ==
Last mayors of Villarroya de los Pinares

Period	Mayor	Party
1979–1983	Juan Ramón López Ariño	UCD |
1983–1987		
1987–1991		
1991–1995		
1995–1999		
1999–2003		
2003–2007		
2007–2011		
2011–2015	Arturo Martín Calvo	PAR |

== Demography ==
Like many other municipalities in the province of Teruel and the province as a whole, Villarroya de los Pinares has a low population density (close to 3 inhabitants / km²). For decades, the municipality has experienced a gradual depopulation of its territory, in parallel to the aging of its inhabitants, as has happened in so many other places of mainly agricultural and livestock vocation, located in the plateaus and mountain ranges of inland Spain.

Demographic Evolution
Year	1900	1910	1920	1930	1940	1950	1960	1970	1980	1981
Population	1,095	942	875	772	641	628	574	400		249
Year	1991	1992	1993	1994	1995	1996	1997	1998	1999	2000
Population	218					214		203	200	201
Year	2001	2002	2003	2004	2005	2006	2007	2008	2009	2010
Population	192	196	193	190	188	194	194	187	190	177
Year	2011	2012	2013	2014	2015	2016	2017	2018	2019	2020
Population	172	163	164	160	163	160	155	160	172	161
Year	2021	2022	2023	2024	2025	2026	2027	2028	2029	2030
Population	187									

== Economy ==
Traditionally, its source of livelihood is agriculture and livestock. More recently, rural tourism has begun to become one more reason to visit the municipality. Nearby are the ski slopes of the Sierra de Gúdar. The abundant hunting and fishing are additional attractions.

== Buildings ==
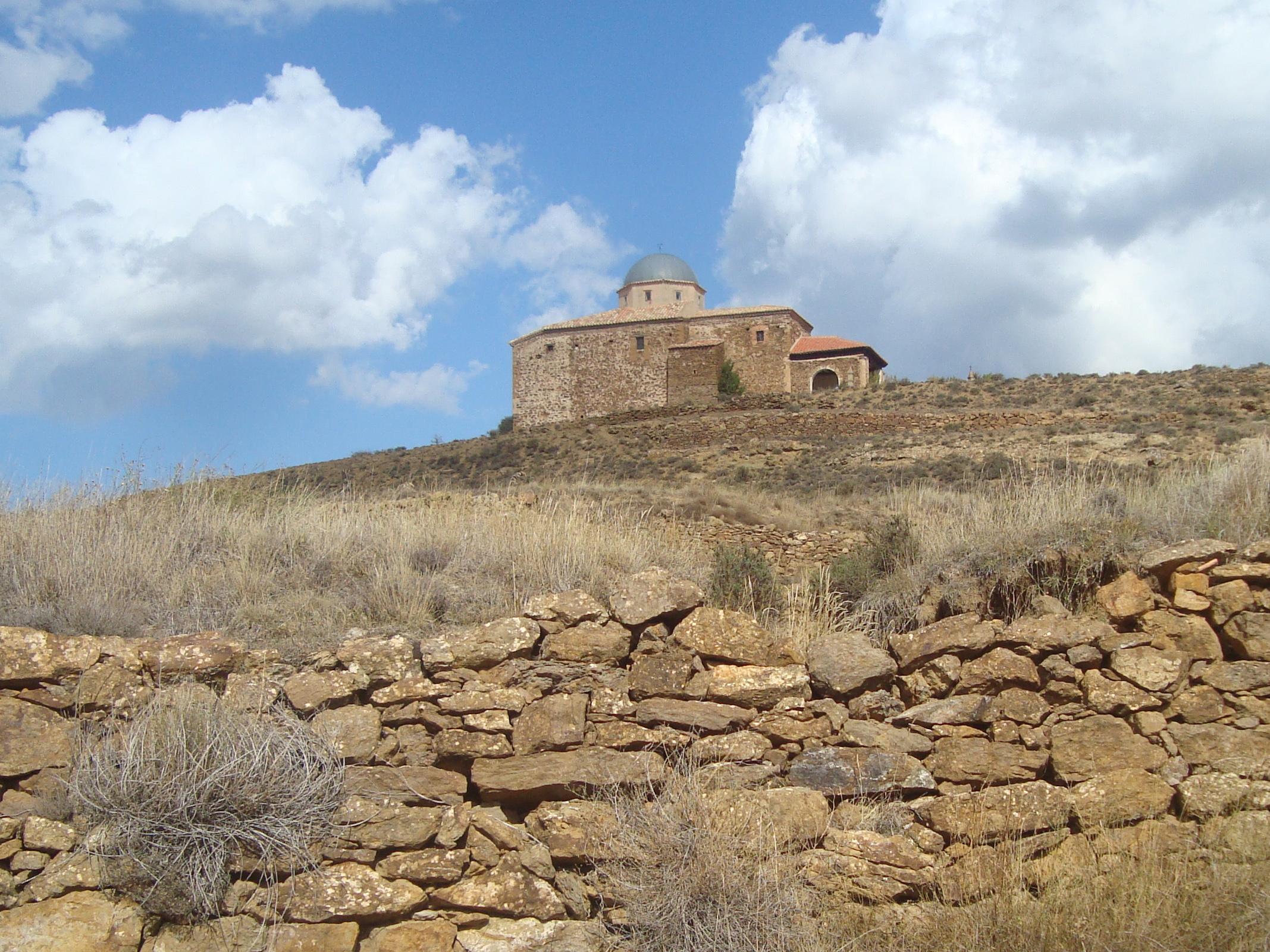
Hermitage of San Benón, Villarroya de los Pinares (Teruel).

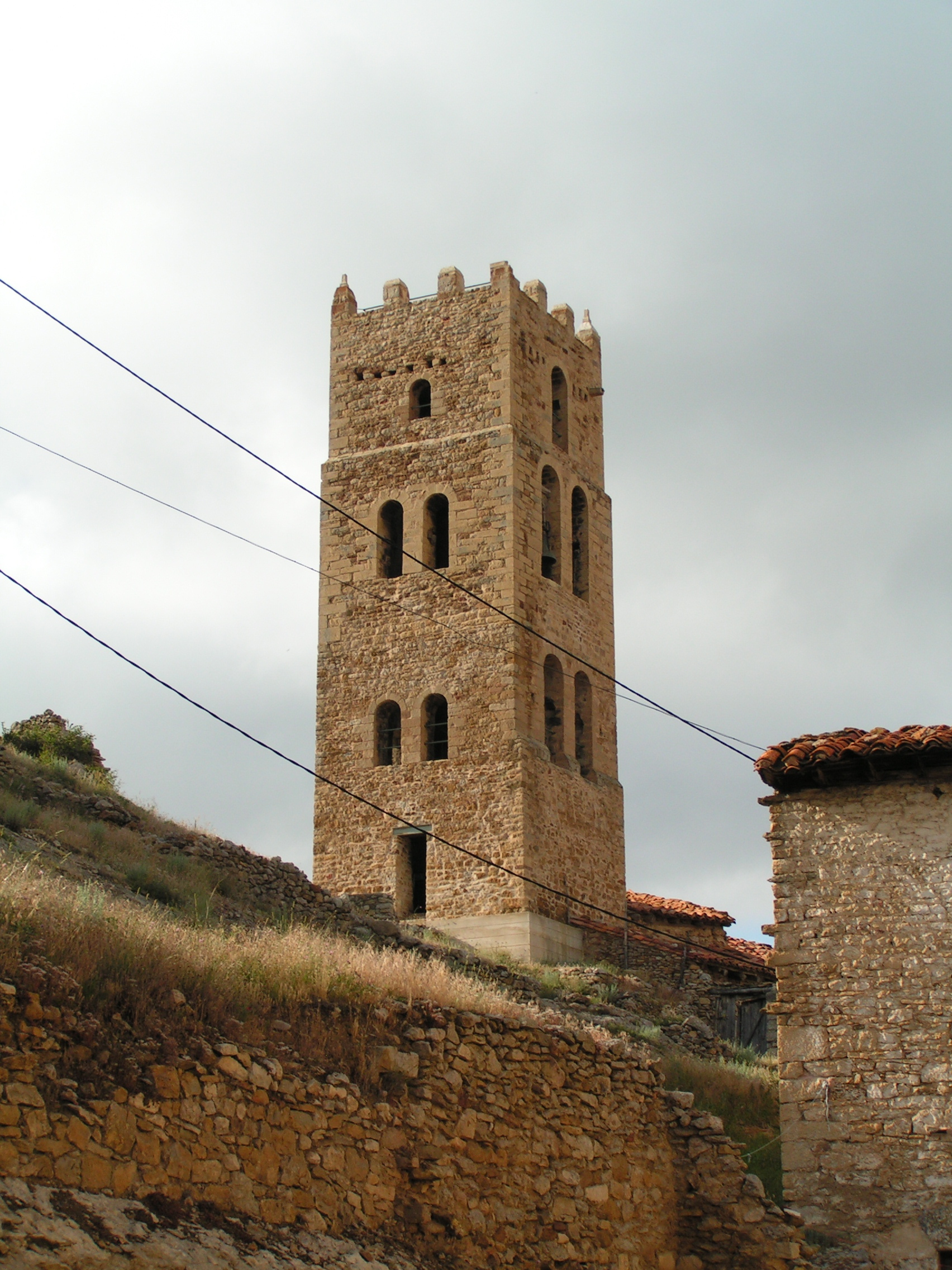
Tower in Villarroya de los Pinares.

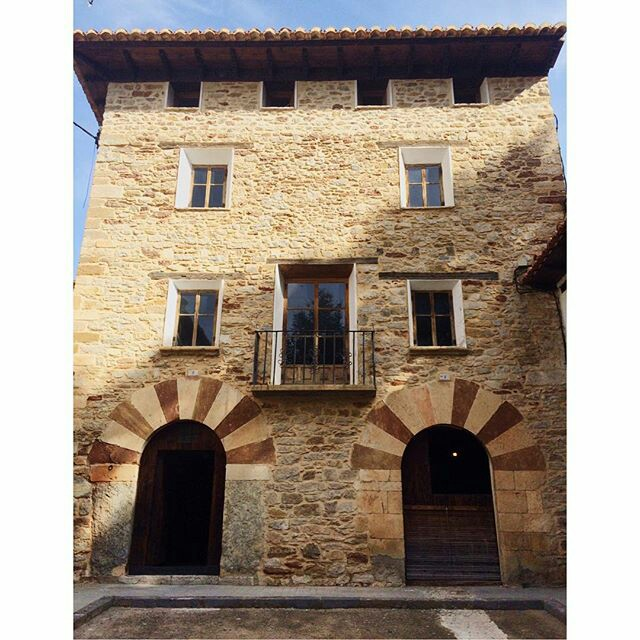
Alegre y Pellicer Ancestral Home.

The municipality of Villarroya de los Pinares was declared a Historic-artistic Site in 1982. Many historic buildings in the urban area are crowned with ancient shields and inscriptions.

The municipality's Gothic church, built-in 1459 and dedicated to the Virgen de la Asunción, has a remarkable polygonal apse and a porticoed gallery. It has undergone several repairs since then. Cardinal Francisco Peña, who always harbored the dream of transforming it into a cathedral, lies buried in it.

The hermitage built in honor of the patron saint of the place, San Benón, stands in the vicinity of the municipality. Also, in the vicinity of this, is the castle in ruins that belonged to James I of Aragón, King of Aragon, Count of Barcelona, and Lord of Montpellier.

== Festivals ==
Two patron saint festivals are celebrated in the village, one on 16 June in honor of San Benón, and the other on 25 July in honor of St. James the Apostle.

== Illustrious personages ==
- Cardinal Francisco Peña, the illustrious son of the municipality, inhabited a house of architectural interest, located in the municipality of Villarroya de los Pinares, which was built at the end of the sixteenth century and the beginning of the XVII and where they find several noble buildings.
- Cmdte. Don Narciso Alegre, who was a Carlist contemporaneous with Ramón Cabrera, 1st Duke of Maestrazgo, was another Villarroya de los Pinares resident.
- Narciso Alegre y Pellicer, son of Narciso Alegre and Juana Pellicer, who was exiled to the Philippines with his younger brother, Francisco, after the third Carlist War.
- The luthier Telesforo Julve, based in Valencia.

== Images ==
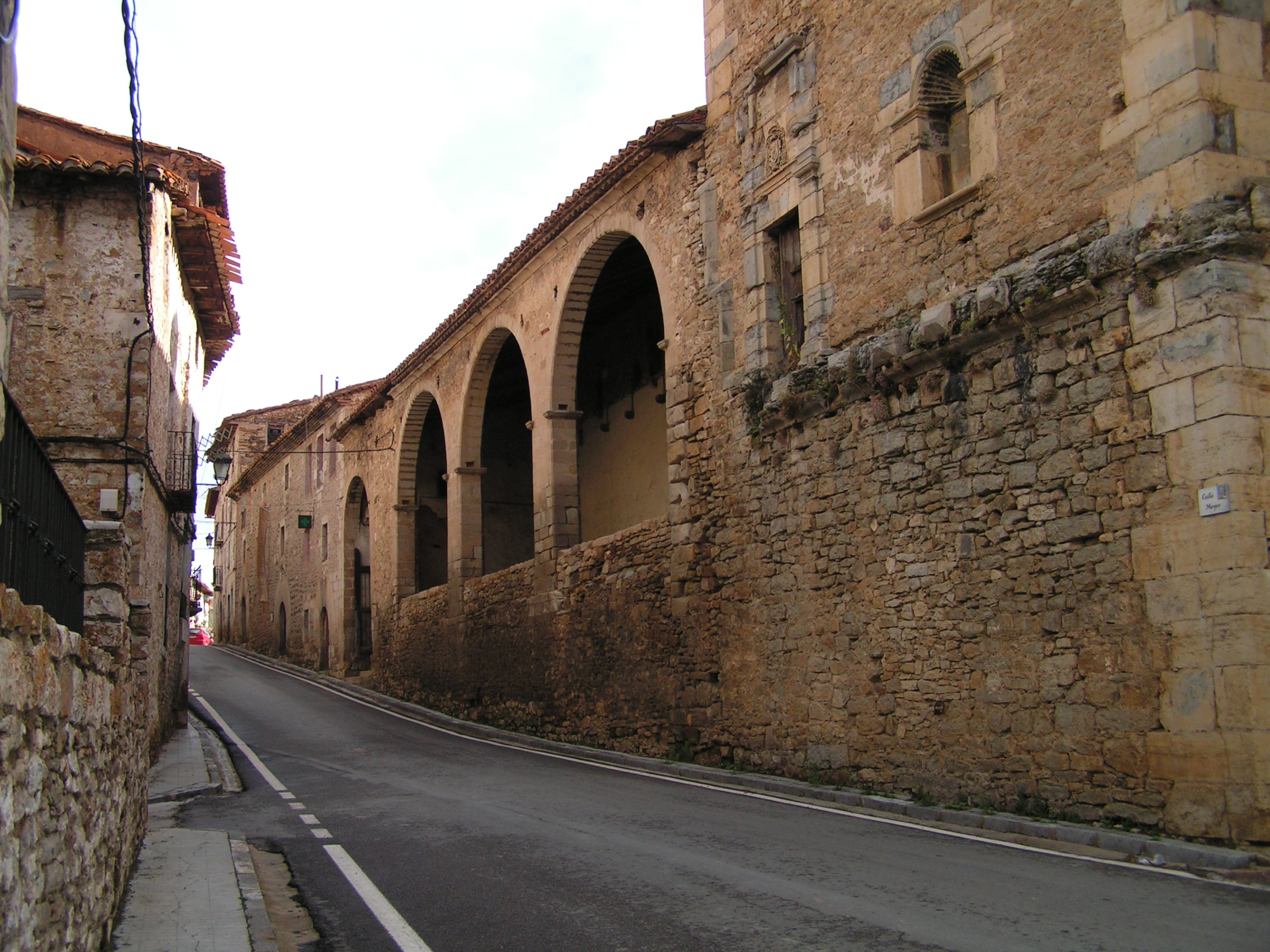
Calle de Villarroya de los Pinares

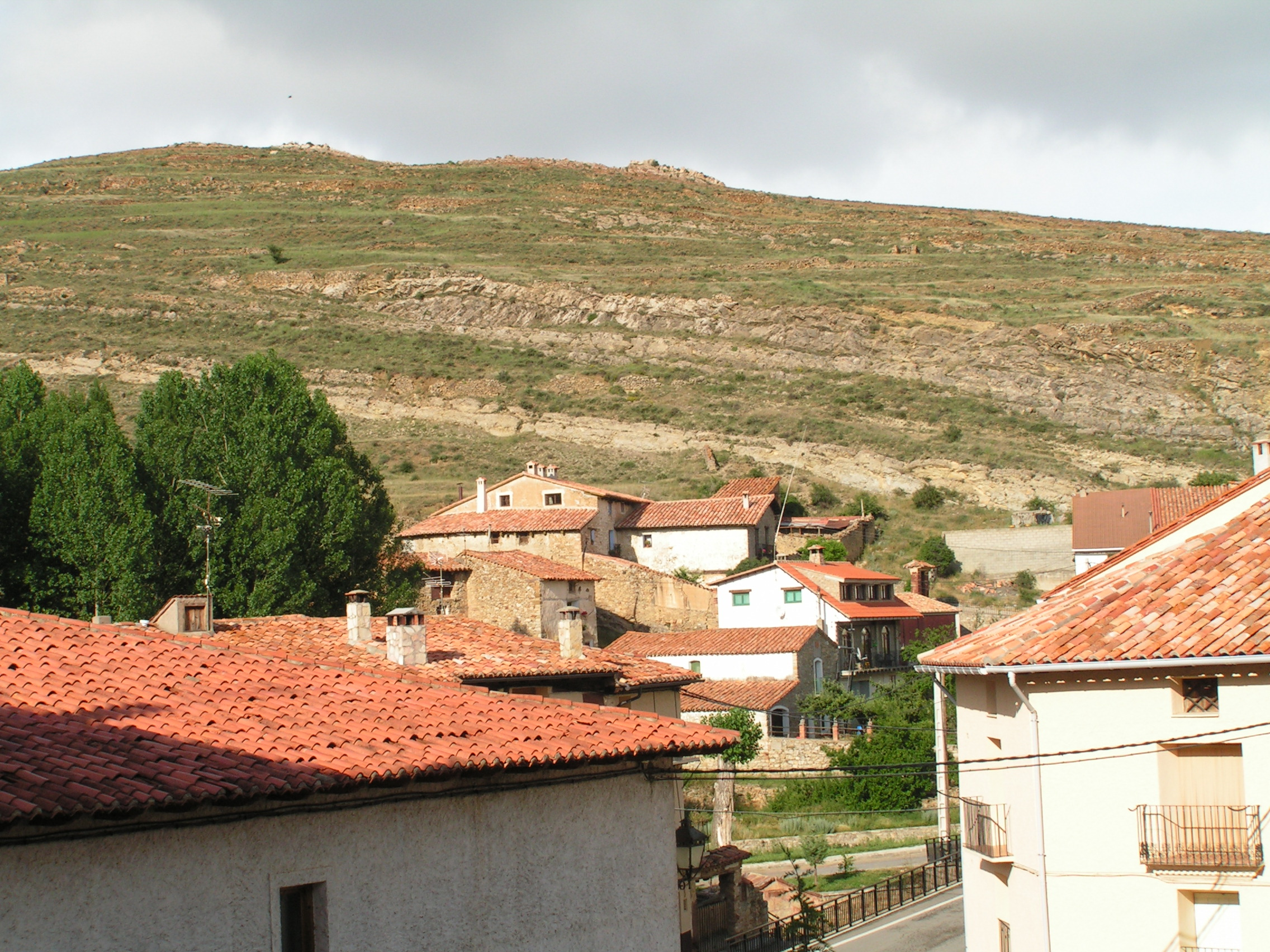
Vista de Villarroya de los Pinares

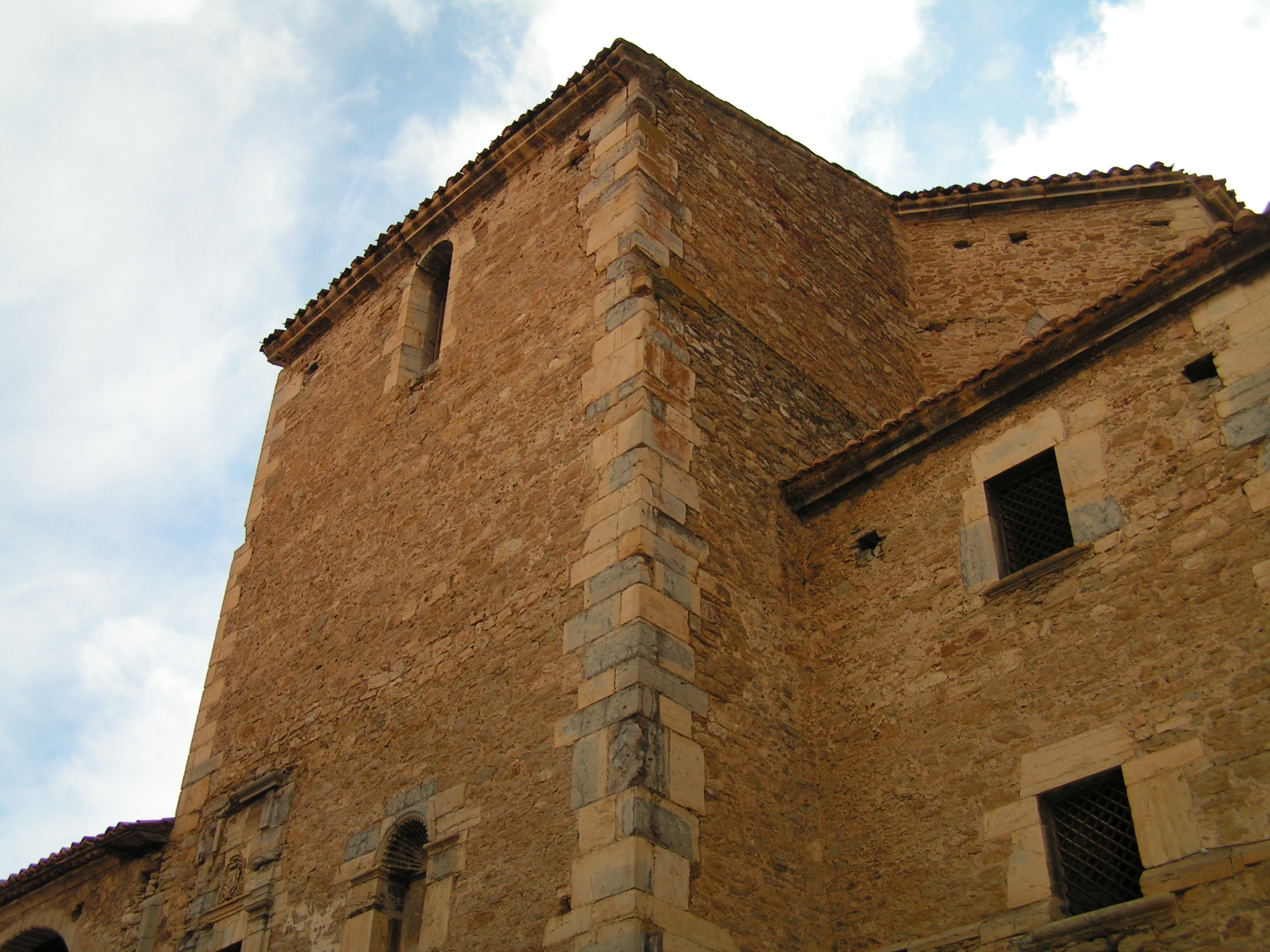
Iglesia de Villarroya de los Pinares

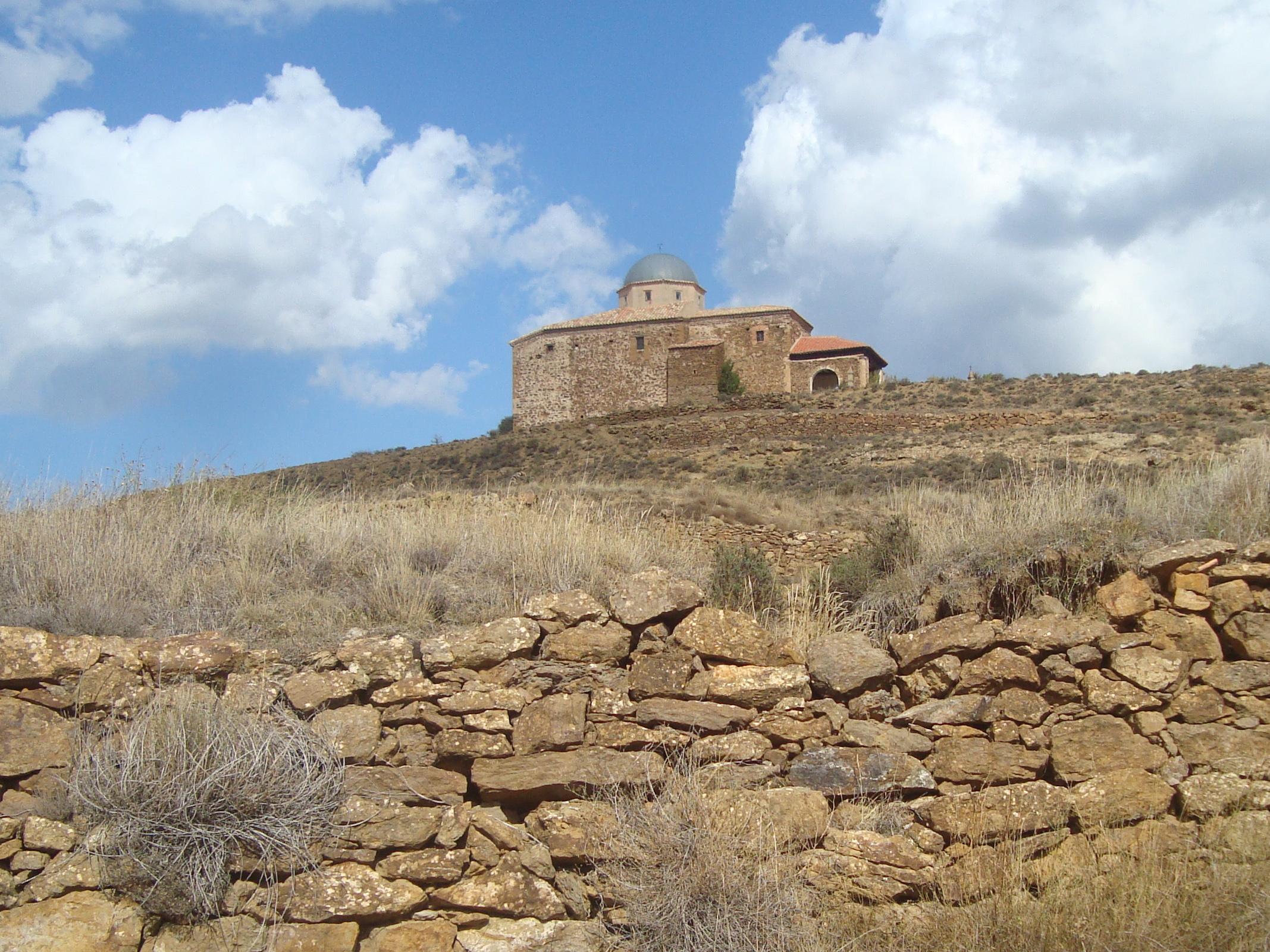
Ermita de San Benón

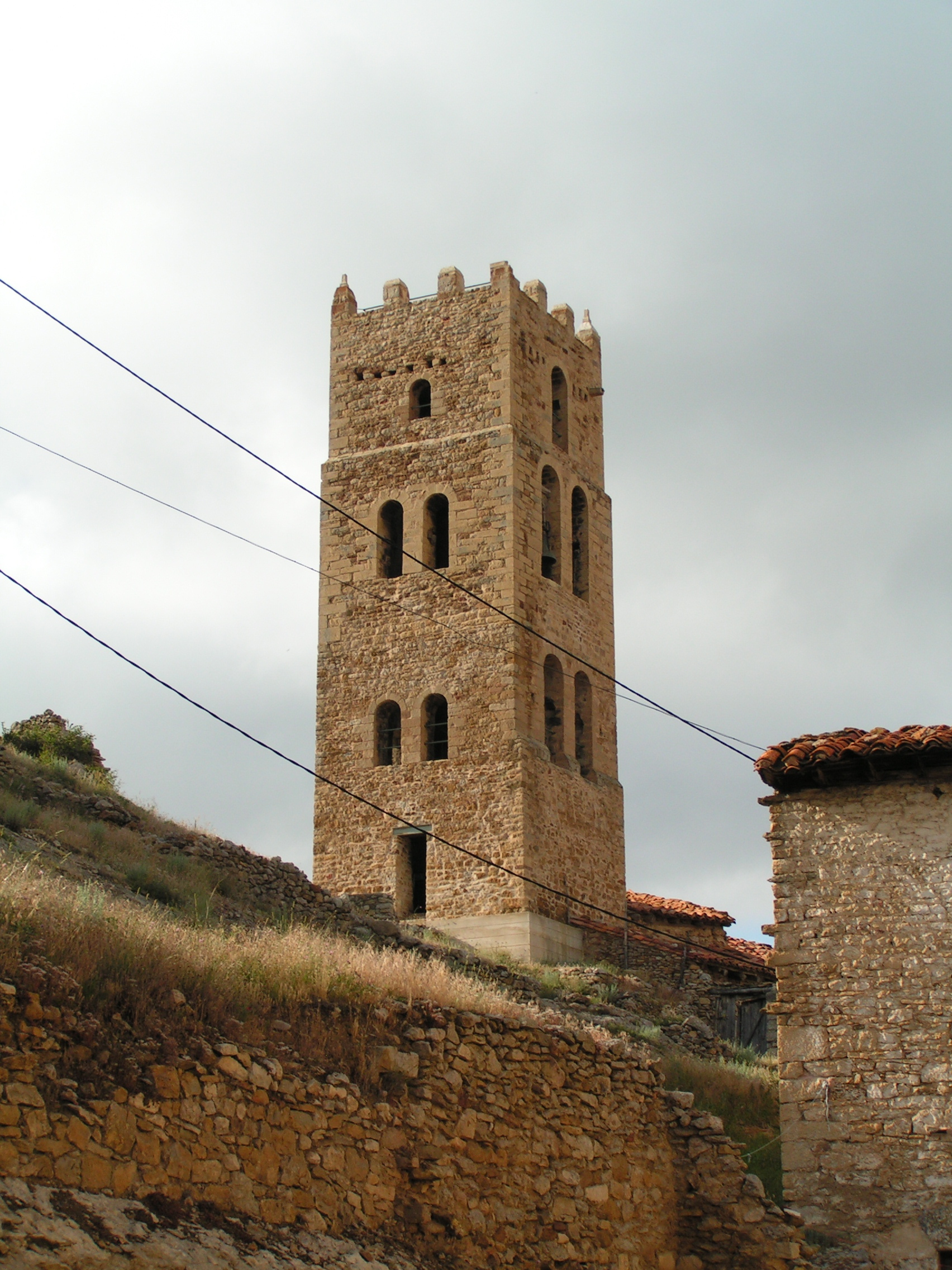
Torreón (Villarroya de los Pinares, Teruel, Aragón)
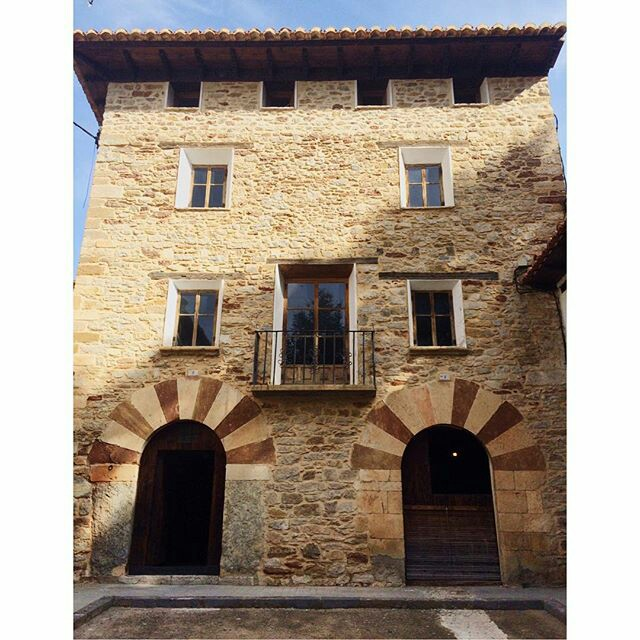
Alegre y Pellicer ancestral home

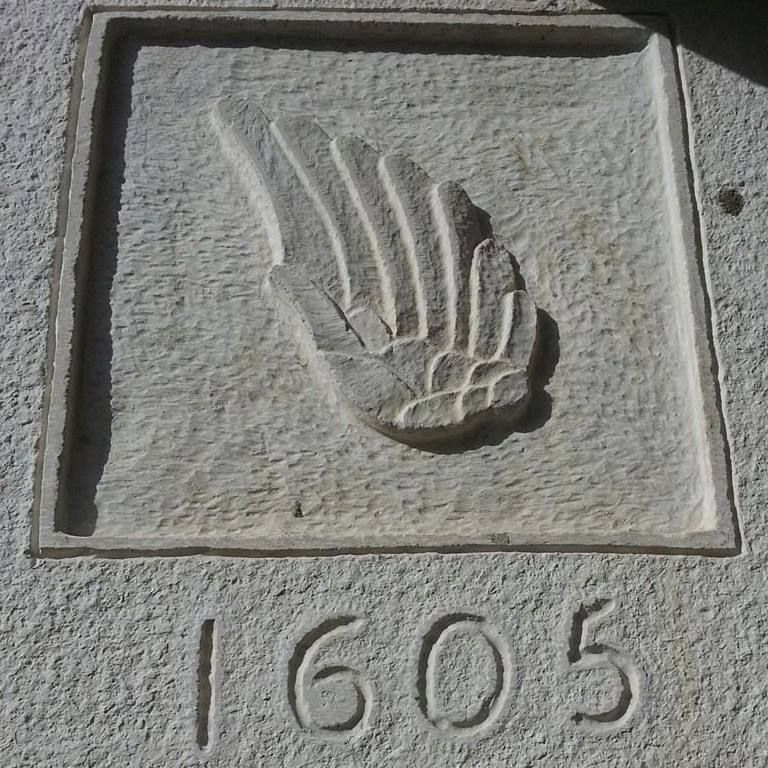
Historical emblem of the Alegre family of Villarroya de los Pinares

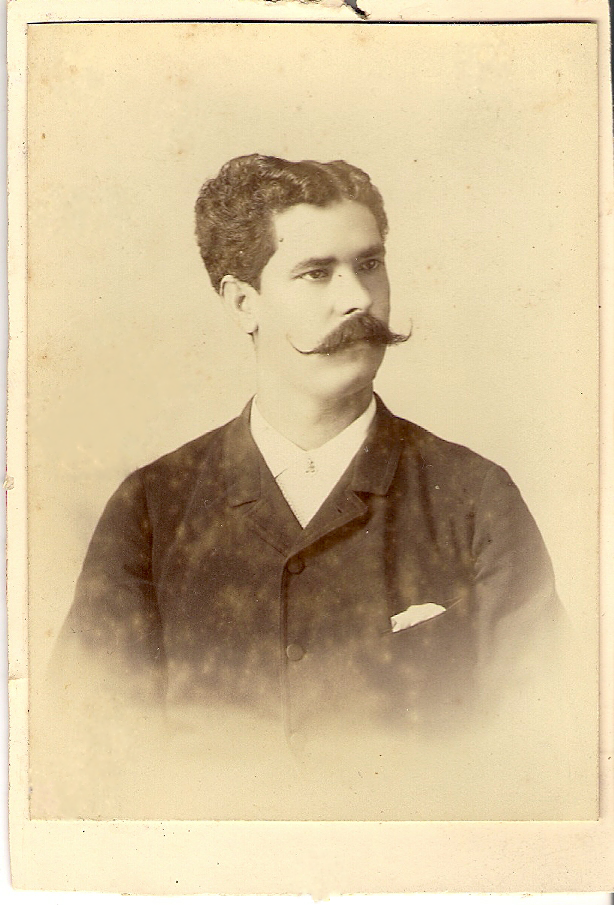
Narciso Alegre y Pellicer, Carlist exile to the Philippines

== See also ==
- Maestrazgo, Aragon
- List of municipalities in Teruel
