= Francisco Peña =

Spanish canon lawyer and scholar (c.1540–1612)

Francisco Peña (also Pegna; c. 1540 – 1612) was a Spanish canon lawyer.

== Life ==
Peña was born in Villarroya de los Pinares in c. 1540. He devoted himself to the study of law at Valencia. Later Philip II of Spain appointed him auditor of the Rota for Spain.

He formed one of the commissions charged with the preparation of the official edition of the Corpus juris canonici, published in 1582, and the anonymous notes appended to the edition of the Decretals are attributed to him. He was also concerned in the canonization of several saints: Didacus of Alcalá, Hyacinth, Raymond, Charles Borromeo, and Frances of Rome, publishing biographies of several of them. Peña was an opponent of Robert Bellarmine's theory of the indirect power of the pope in temporal affairs.

He died in Rome in 1612.

== Works ==
His principal works are:

- "In Directorium Inquisitorum a Nicolao Eimerico conscriptum commentaria" (Rome, 1578);
- "De officio Inquisitionis" (Cremona, 1655);
- "In Ambrosii de Vignate tractatum de hæresi commentaria et in Pauli Grillandi de hæreticis et eorum pœnis notæ" (Rome, 1581);
- "In Bernardi Comensis Dominicani Lucernam inquisitorum notæ et ejusdem tractatum de strigibus" (Rome, 1584);
- "Responsio canonica ad scriptum nuper editum in causa Henrici Borbonii quo illius fautores persuadere nituntur episcopos in Francia jure illos absolvere potuisse" (Rome, 1595);
- "Censura in arrestum Parlamentale Curiæ criminalis Parisiensis contra Joannem Castellum et patres Societatis Jesu" (Rome, 1595);
- "De temporali regno Christi" (Rome, 1611).

His "Decisiones sacræ Rotæ" were published by Urritigoiti (2 vols., Zaragoza, 1648–1650).
