= Maestrazgo, Aragon =

Coordinates: 40°30′N 0°24′E

Maestrazgo
- Comarca
- Location in Aragon.
- Interactive map of Maestrazgo
- Country: Spain
- Autonomous community: Aragon
- Province: Teruel
- Capital: Cantavieja
- Municipalities: List: Allepuz, Bordón, Cantavieja, Cañada de Benatanduz, Castellote, La Cuba, Fortanete, La Iglesuela del Cid, Mirambel, Miravete de la Sierra, Molinos, Pitarque, Tronchón, Villarluengo and Villarroya de los Pinares

Area
  - Total: 1,204.3 km^{2} (465.0 sq mi)

Population
  - Total: 3,737
  - Density: 3.103/km^{2} (8.037/sq mi)
- Time zone: UTC+1 (CET)
  - Summer (DST): UTC+2 (CEST)
- Largest municipality: Cantavieja

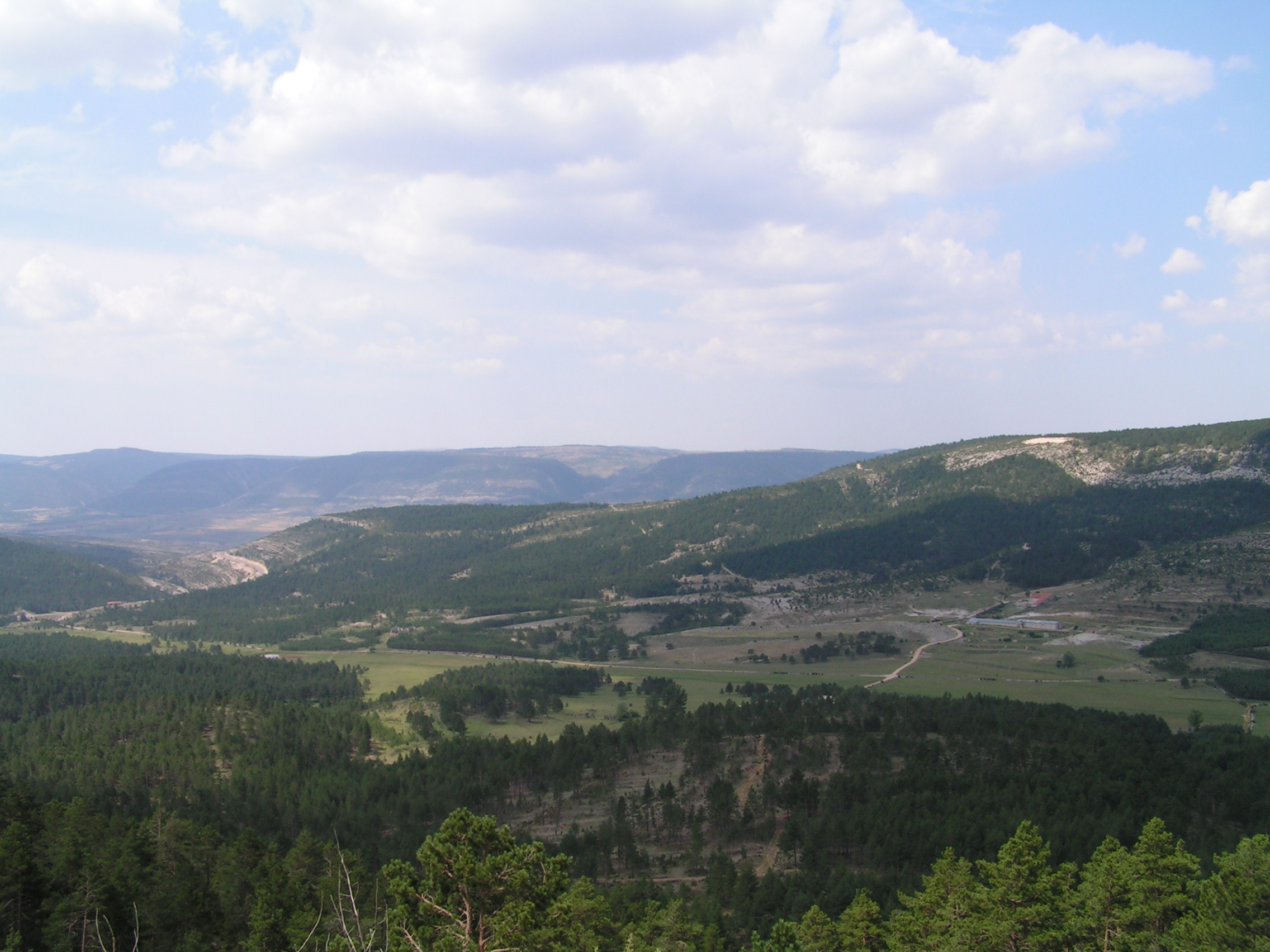
Sierra de Gúdar landscape near Fortanete

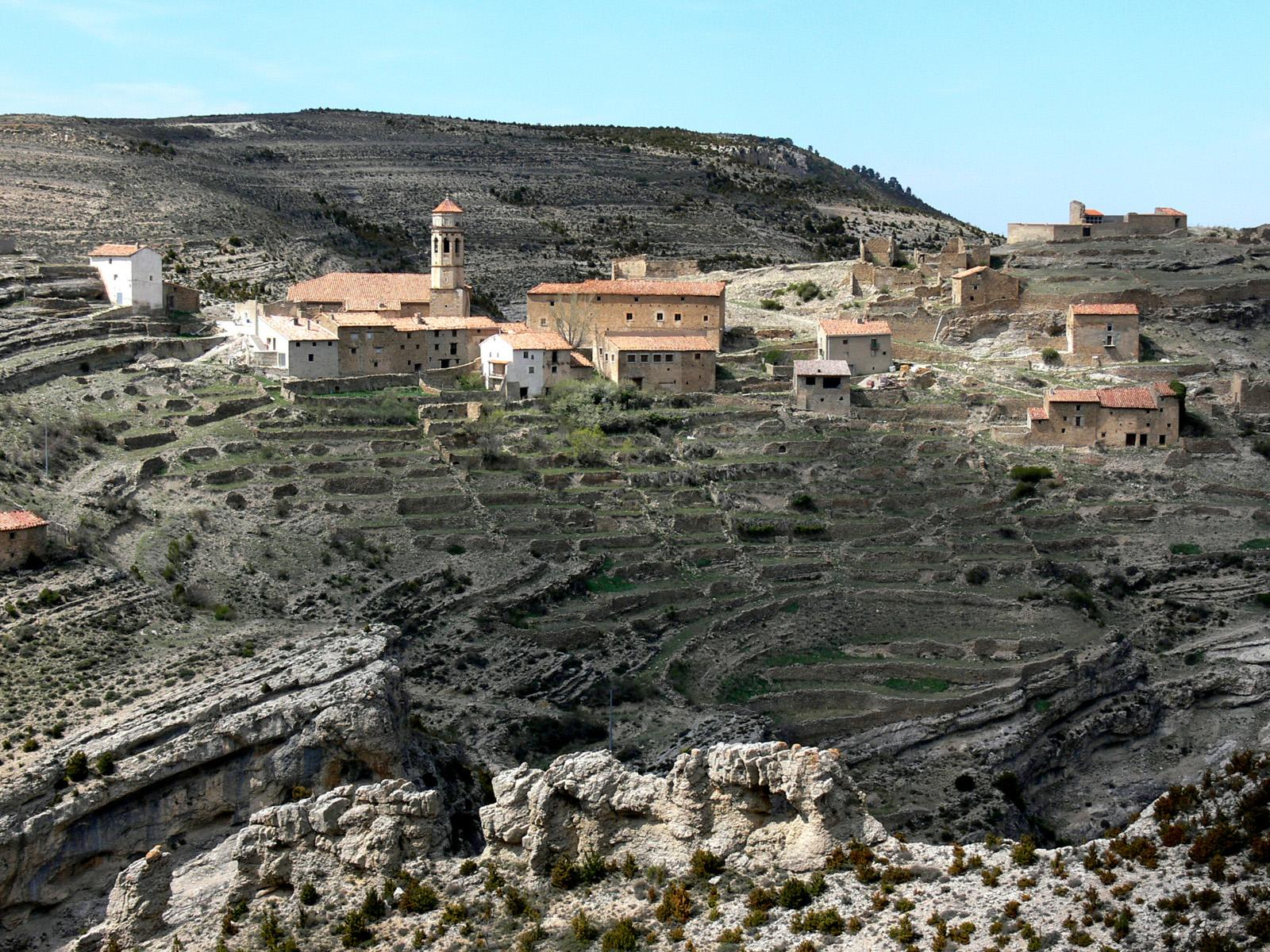
The town of Cañada de Benatanduz.

Maestrazgo (Aragonese: Mayestrato) is a comarca in southeastern Aragon, Spain. Its names derives from the Maestrat/Maestrazgo mountain massif that extends to the east to the Comarques of the Valencian Community Alt Maestrat and Baix Maestrat. The most important town is Cantavieja. It is bordered by the Aragonese comarcas of Andorra-Sierra de Arcos, Cuencas Mineras, Comunidad de Teruel and Bajo Aragón, in the north and in the west and Gúdar-Javalambre in the south, as well as with the Castellón Province (Ports (comarca), Alt Maestrat Alcalatén) in the east. Some municipal terms of this comarca are part of the historical region of Lower Aragon.

This comarca has a dry, continental climate, with extreme seasonal changes, and even daily temperatures. Summers are hot and relatively short compared with the long, cold winters.

== Mountains and rivers ==
The Maestrazgo is in a very mountainous region located at the eastern end of the Iberian System. The main range in this comarca is the Sierra de Gúdar located roughly in the center. Other important ranges are Sierra de la Lastra, Sierra de Garrocha, Sierra de Caballos, Sierra de la Cañada, Sierra Carrascosa and Sierra del Rayo. The summits of the highest mountains, like Peñarroya (2,019), Alto del Pobo (1,770 m) and Tarayuela (1,738 m) are frequently covered with snow in the winter.

The most important river draining the area is the Guadalope River. River Mijares marks the southern limits of the comarca and Alfambra River the western.

== See also ==
- Ports (comarca)
- Comarcas of Aragon
- Mountains of Aragon
- Iberian System
