= Tronchón =

- Municipality
- Tronchon August 2008

- Coat of arms

- Location in Spain
- Coordinates: 40°37′14.14″N 0°23′53.82″W
- Country: Spain
- Autonomous community: Aragón
- Province: Teruel
- Comarca: Maestrazgo
- Judicial district: Alcañiz

Government
  - Alcalde: José Manuel Molina Mateo

Area
  - Total: 57.1 km^{2} (22.0 sq mi)
- Elevation: 1,096 m (3,596 ft)

Population (2025-01-01)
  - Total: 56
  - Density: 0.98/km^{2} (2.5/sq mi)
- Demonym(s): Tronchonero, -a
- Time zone: UTC+1 (CET)
  - Summer (DST): UTC+2 (CEST)
- Postal code: 44141
- Official language(s): Spanish

Tronchón is a town located in the province of Teruel in the autonomous community of Aragon, Spain. The town is near the border with Castellón, a province in the autonomous community of Valencia. It is situated in Teruel's mountainous area known as Maestrazgo.

== Geography ==
The town is 1,096 m (3,596 ft) above sea level and is located at 40°37'14.14"N 0°23'53.82"W. It is 71 km (44 mi) away (geographic distance) from the Mediterranean coast.

== People ==
In 2001 census, the town recorded 103 inhabitants. The town has experienced a continuous reduction of population during the end of the 19th century and the 20th century. In 1910 the town recorded 991 inhabitants, and in 1970 it recorded only 331 inhabitants. During the last decade of the 20th century and the first decade of 21st century the town has received an incoming flow of immigrants from Romania.

Tronchón's cheese is mentioned twice in the 17th century book Don Quixote, by Miguel de Cervantes. Nowadays the town still produces its old cheese made from sheep and goat milk. Tronchon also used to be an important producer of felt hats. That production halted with the industrialization of the production process.

Currently its economy is based in agriculture and cattle. In recent years tourist activities have also grown in the town.

== History ==
Tronchón received the status of "town" on June 22, 1272.

== See also ==
- List of municipalities in Teruel
