= Villarluengo =

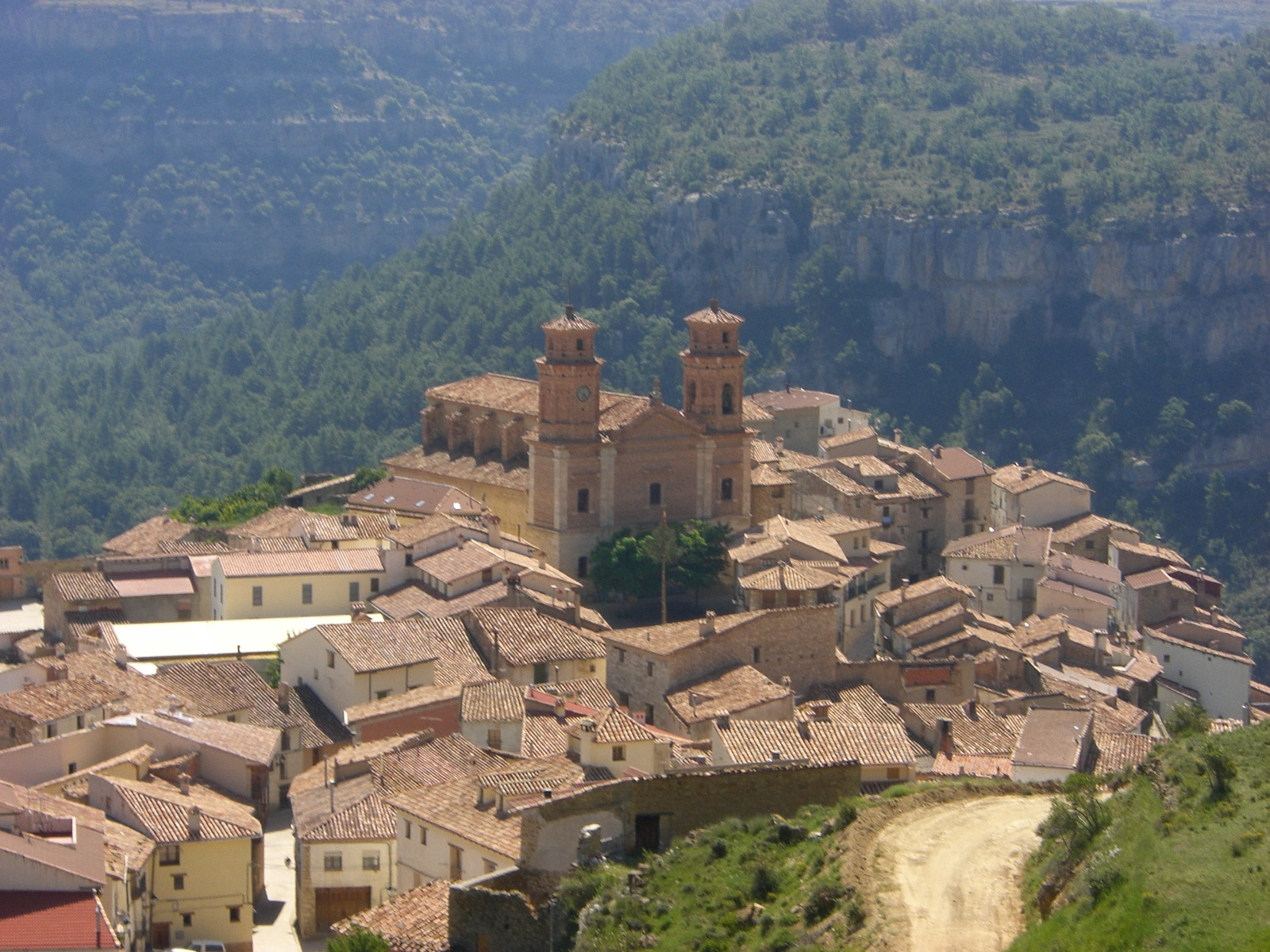

- Location within Spain
- Coordinates: 40°39′N 0°31′W
- Country: Spain
- Autonomous community: Aragon
- Province: Teruel
- Comarca: Maestrazgo, Aragon

Area
  - Total: 157.89 km^{2} (60.96 sq mi)
- Elevation: 1,119 m (3,671 ft)

Population (2025-01-01)
  - Total: 159
  - Density: 1.01/km^{2} (2.61/sq mi)
- Time zone: UTC+1 (CET)
  - Summer (DST): UTC+2 (CEST)

Villarluengo is a municipality at the heart of the mountainous Maestrazgo comarca, province of Teruel, Aragon, Spain. According to the 2010 census the municipality has a population of 188 inhabitants.

Villarluengo is located on top of a spectacular rocky outcrop at the edge of a deep canyon, at the confluence of the Palomita and Cañada rivers. The town is surrounded by mountains, the Sierra de Garrocha, Sierra Carrascosa and Sierra de la Cañada mountain ranges, as well as the Muela Mujer and Muela Mochén mesa type mountains.

The municipal term includes the Las Fábricas abandoned mills and the small village of Montoro de Mezquita.

== See also ==
- Maestrazgo, Aragon
- List of municipalities in Teruel
