= Luco de Bordón =

Human settlement in Teruel Province, Aragon, Spain

Coordinates: 40°42′N 0°18′W

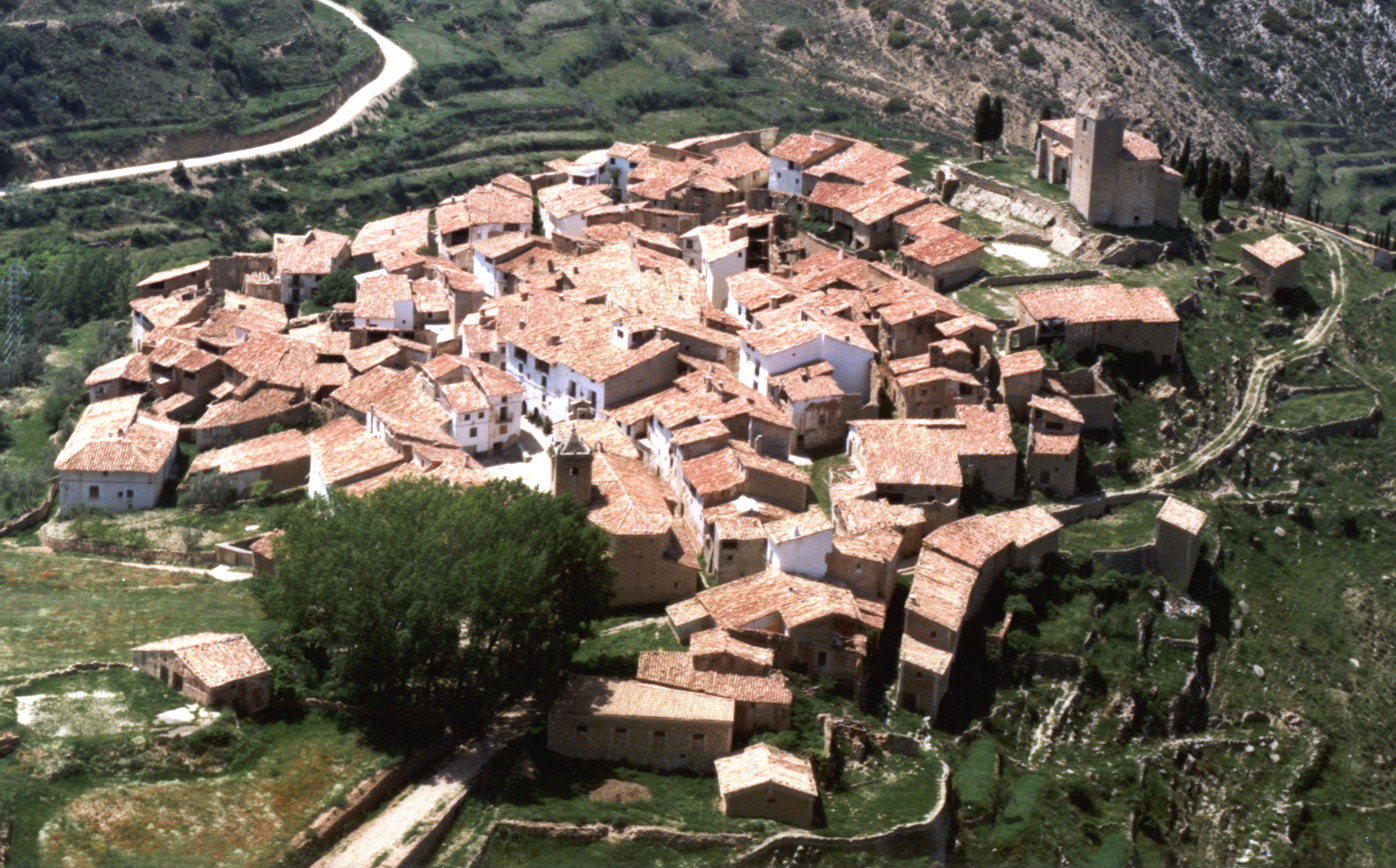
Luco de Bordón

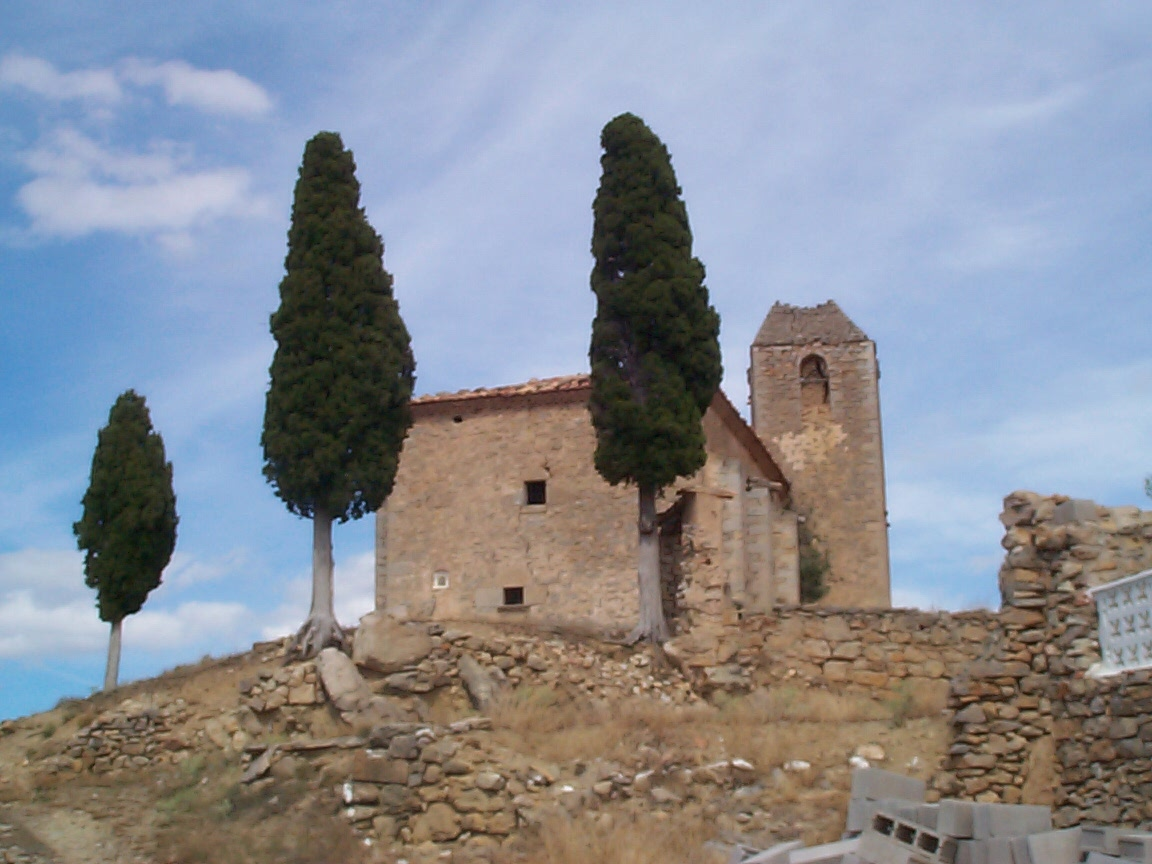
Ermita del Calvario

Luco de Bordón is a town in the municipality of Castellote in Spain's Teruel province.

== Location ==
The town is located 811 meters above sea level in the Sierra de Bordón. Its administration is the province of Teruel, on the border with Valencia. The town of Villores is connected to Luco by CV-119 (Castellón province), and TE-8402 (Teruel province) that crosses the two villages.

The core of Luco de Bordón is built on a hilltop and surrounded by half of a ravine near Bordón River, a tributary of the River Guadalope.

== History ==
The name Luco derives from the Latin Lucus, meaning 'forest'. The town's history began at the end of the twelfth century (around 1196, when it was documented) when the first commander of Castellote, Gascon Castellot of Ramon Berenguer IV, yielded the town with all its territory. The territory was composed of different towns: Abenfigo, Bordón, Luco, Santolea, Seno, Las Cuevas de Cañart, Ladruñán, Dos Torres de Mercader and Las Parras y Torremocha,

In 1272 Luco was a dependent group of Bordon, and could appear in the National Historical Archive. On 4 January 1282 the Templars granted a letter officially creating towns in different places, including (Castellote, Bordón, Las Cuevas de Cañart, Santolea and Seno.

In 1367, Bordón and Luco among other towns became independent of Castellote and in 1535 Luco became independent of Bordón. In 1400, the pastor of Bordón, Don Juan Calvo, bequeathed the chapel built at his own expense to the parishioners of Luco. The chapel later became the parish church of Luco.

During the 1970s, towns such as Cuevas Cañart, Ladruñán, Luco, Dos Torres de Mercader and Santolea were incorporated into Castellote, losing their status as independent municipalities.

Year	Population
1849	626
1877	672
1950	Approx. 400
1960	Approx. 300
1991	26
2004	14
2011	7

== Places of interest ==
The path leading to the shrine of Pilar runs along the road in front of the village and enters the valley along the hillside on the right bank.

The source of the Bordón river is located one hour from the village.

The Morron is a stony mass that offers a view of the landscape and sunsets.

The houses of Huergo are near a waterfall.
