= Cantavieja =

- Municipality
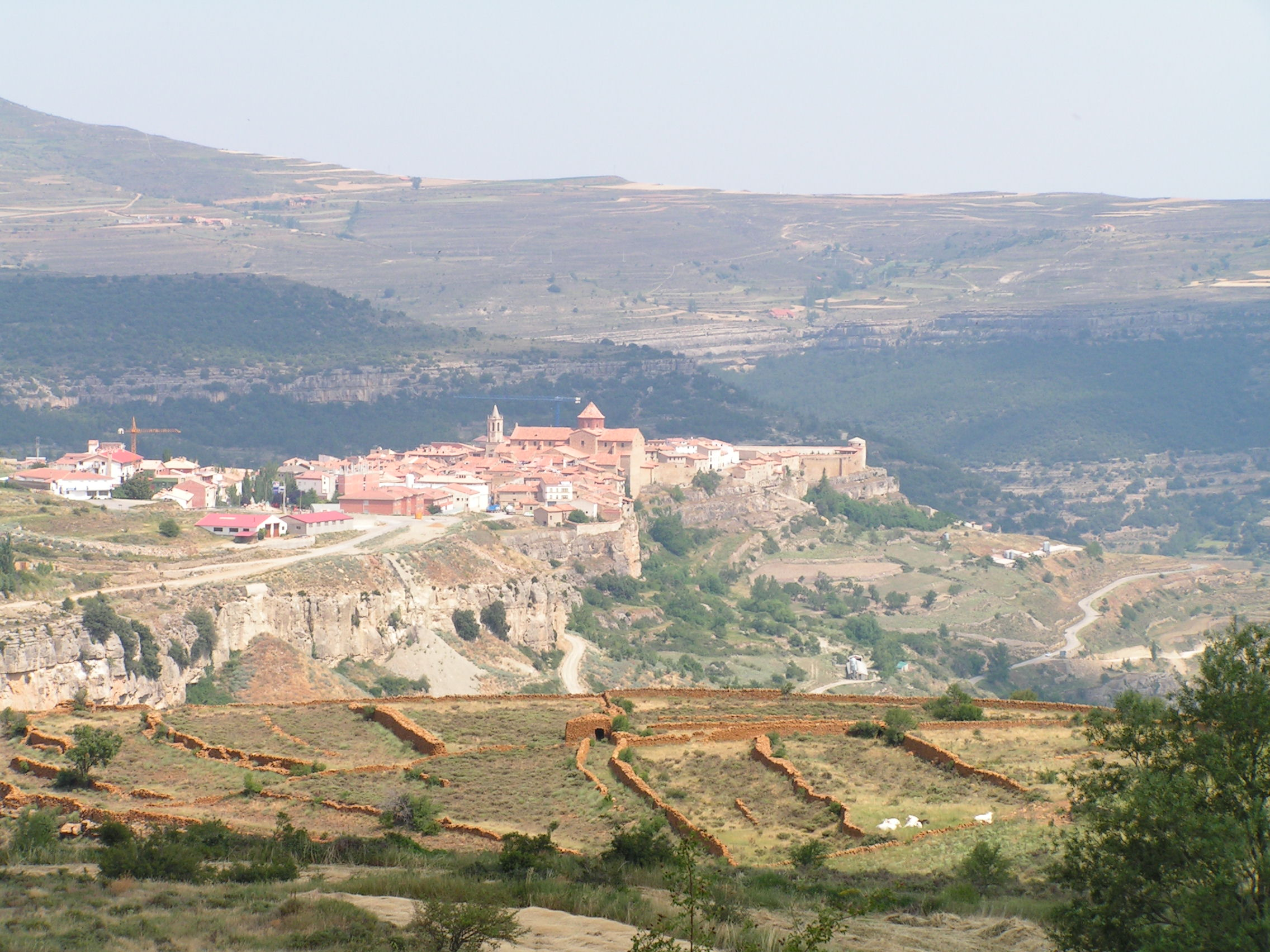
- General view

- Coat of arms

- Location in Spain
- Coordinates: 40°30′N 0°24′W
- Country: Spain
- Autonomous community: Aragón
- Province: Teruel
- Comarca: Maestrazgo
- Judicial district: Alcañiz
- Commonwealth: El Maestrazgo
- Founded: 1197

Government
  - Alcalde: Miguel Ángel Serrano Godoy (2007)

Area
  - Total: 124.56 km^{2} (48.09 sq mi)
- Elevation: 1,290 m (4,230 ft)

Population (2025-01-01)
  - Total: 729
  - Density: 5.85/km^{2} (15.2/sq mi)
- Demonym(s): Cantaviejo, -a
- Time zone: UTC+1 (CET)
  - Summer (DST): UTC+2 (CEST)
- Postal code: 44140
- Dialing code: (+34)964
- Official language(s): Spanish
- Website: Official website

Spanish Cultural Heritage
- Type: Non-movable
- Criteria: Historic ensemble
- Designated: 20 August 1981
- Reference no.: RI-53-0000248

Cantavieja is a municipality located in the province of Teruel, Aragon, Spain. According to the 2004 census (INE), the municipality had a population of 740 inhabitants. It is the capital of the Maestrazgo comarca.

== Demography ==
Population trend
1890	1910	1920	1930	1940	1950	1960	1970	1981	1991	2001	2007	2008
1.962	2.049	2.005	1.866	1.674	1.587	1.338	1.060	877	750	759	729	735

== Photo gallery ==
Cantavieja pictures

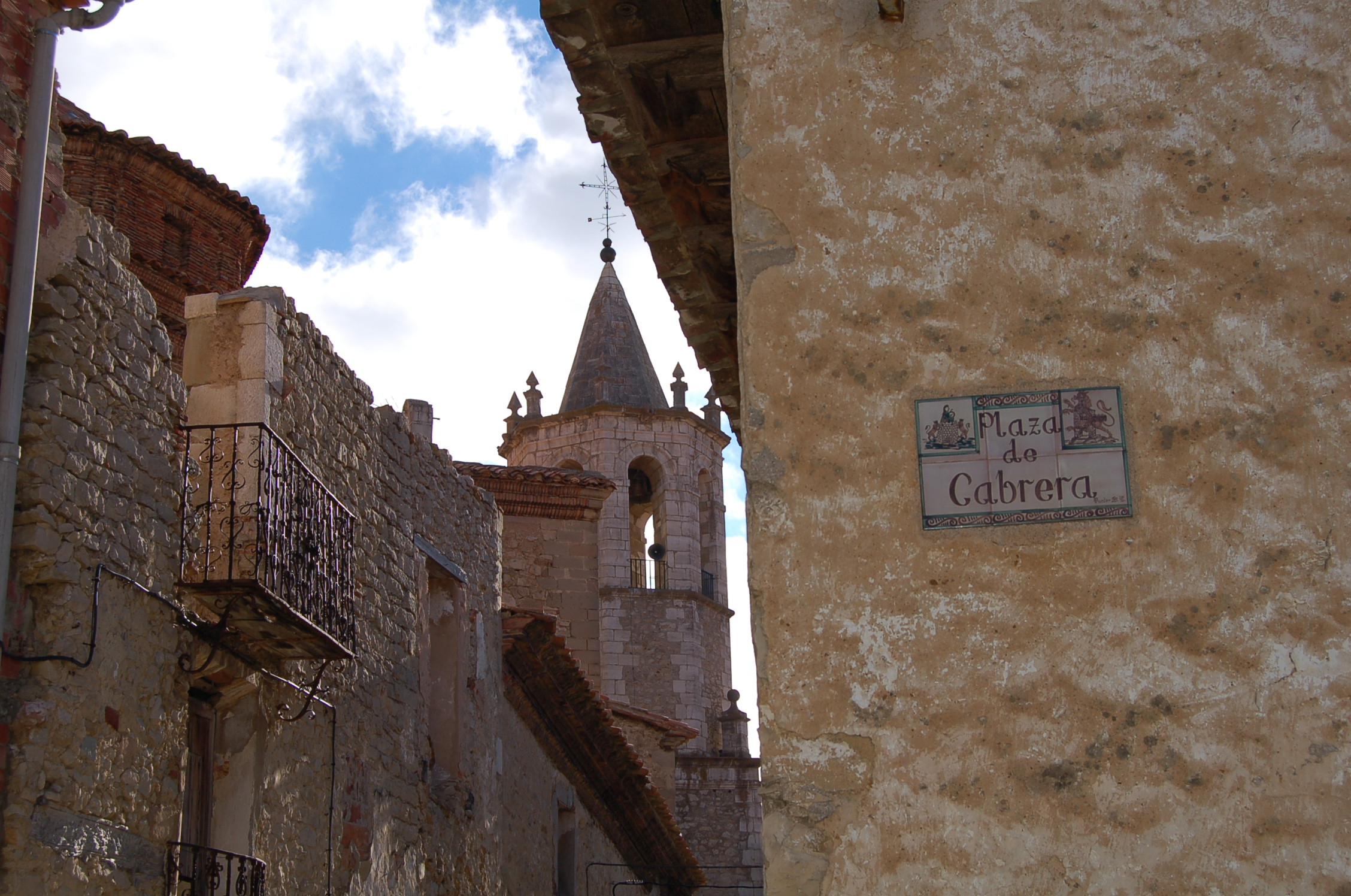

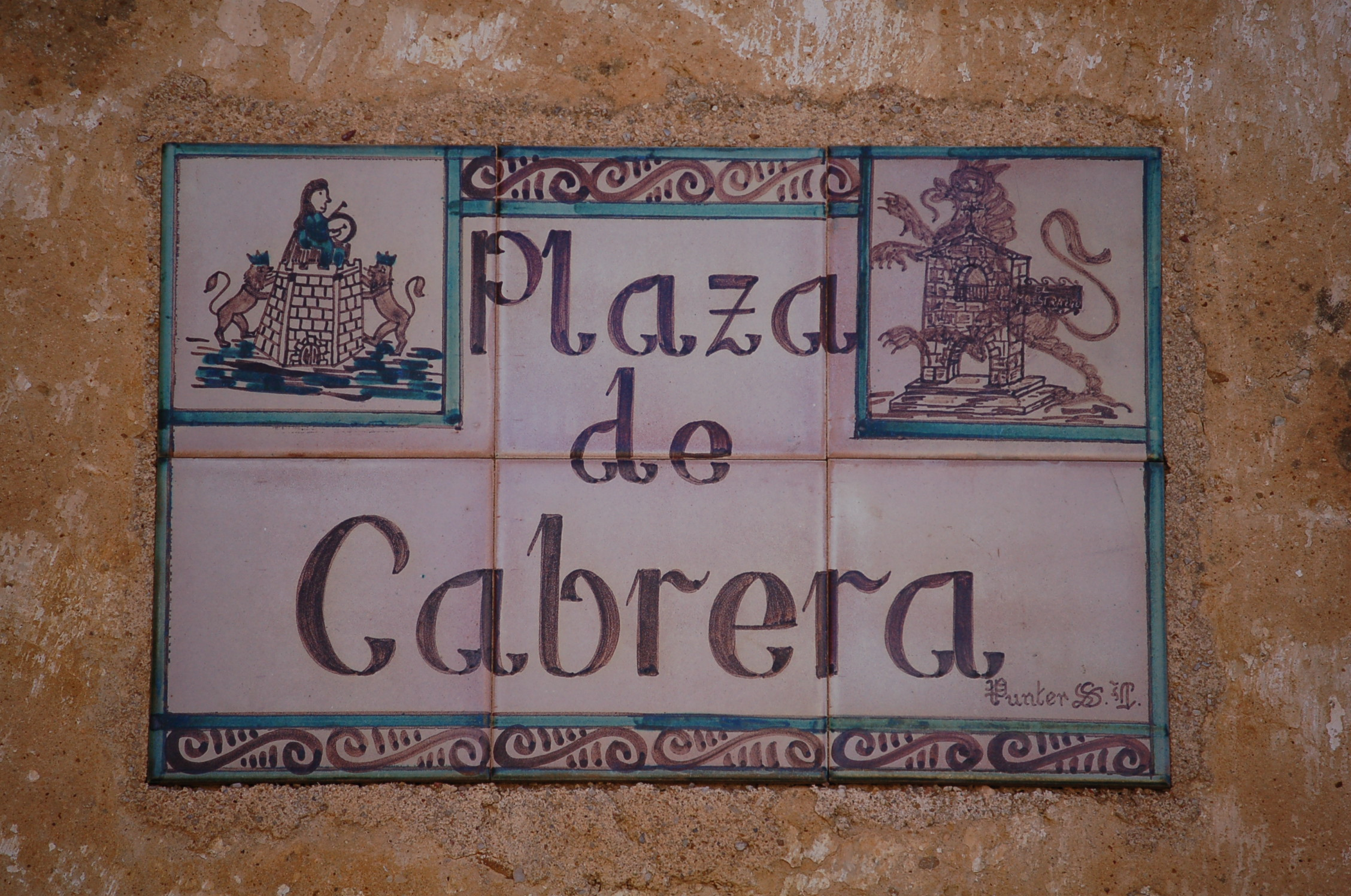

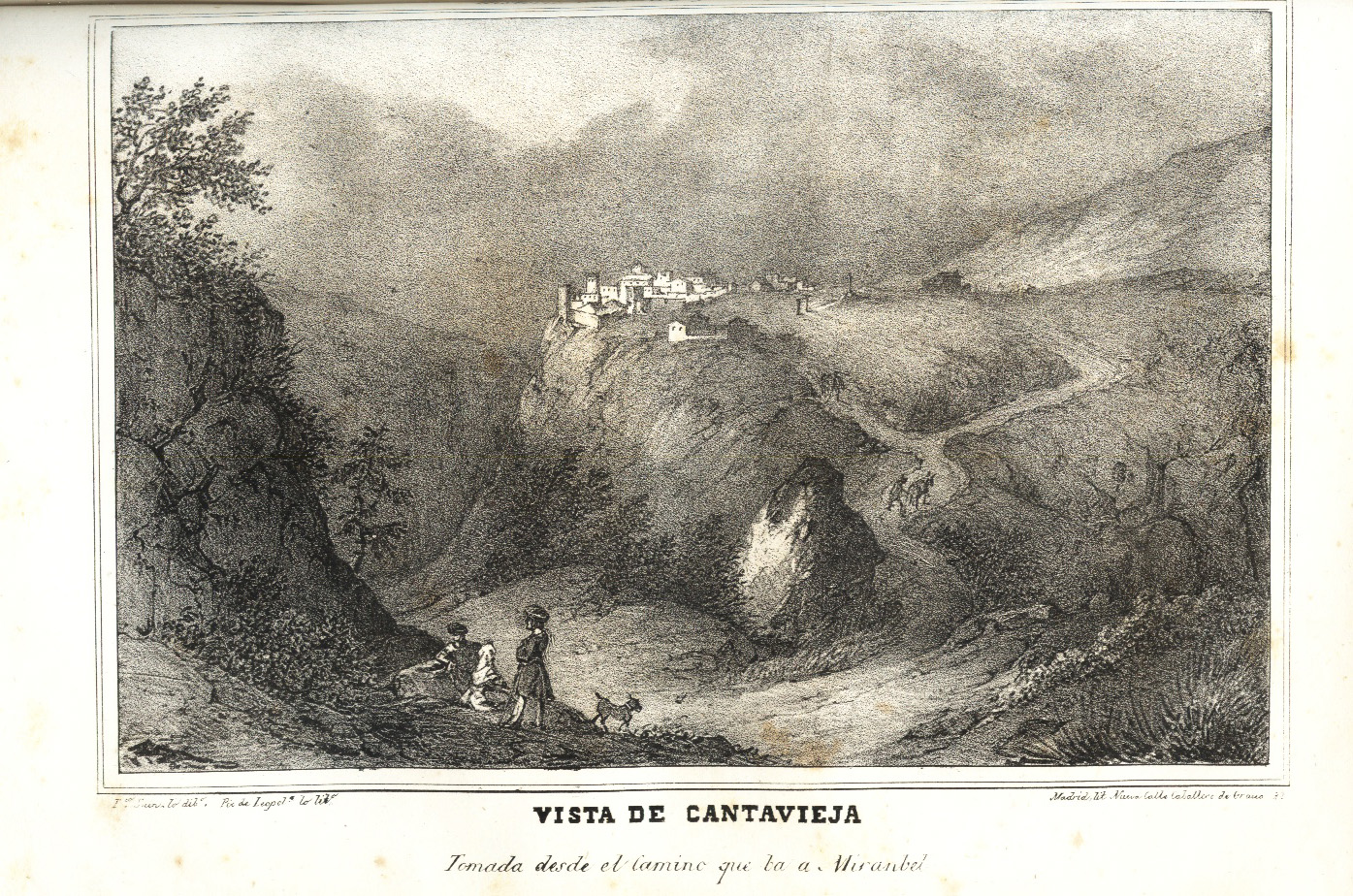

== See also ==
- List of municipalities in Teruel
