= Molinos, Teruel =

Molinos
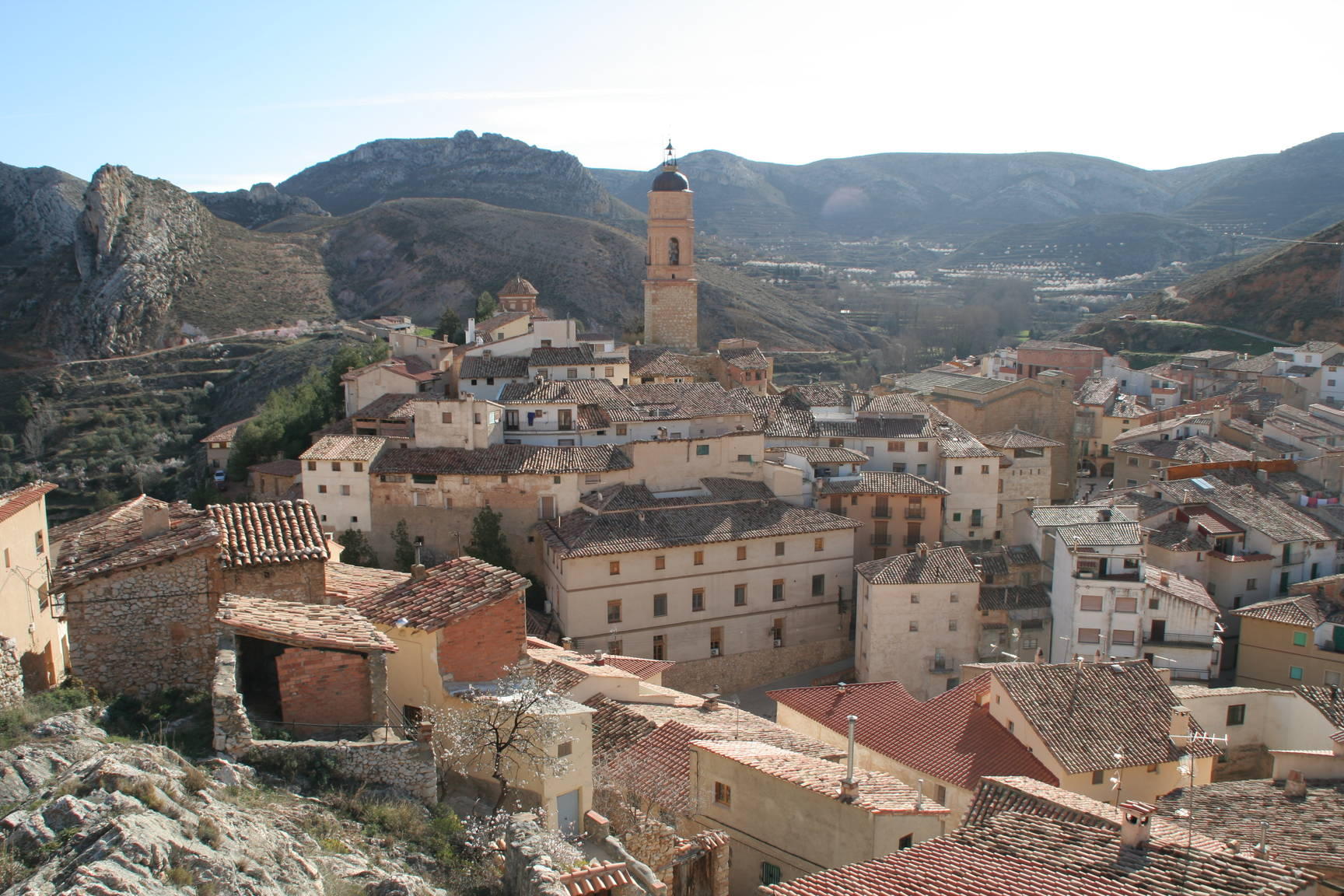

- Location within Spain
- Coordinates: 40°49′N 0°27′W
- Country: Spain
- Autonomous community: Aragon
- Province: Teruel
- Comarca: Maestrazgo, Aragon

Area
  - Total: 79.61 km^{2} (30.74 sq mi)
- Elevation: 838 m (2,749 ft)

Population (2025-01-01)
  - Total: 232
  - Density: 2.91/km^{2} (7.55/sq mi)
- Time zone: UTC+1 (CET)
  - Summer (DST): UTC+2 (CEST)

Molinos is a municipality located in the Maestrazgo comarca, province of Teruel, Aragon, Spain. According to the 2010 census the municipality has a population of 303 inhabitants.

The impressive Grutas de Cristal "glass caves" are located within Molinos municipal term.

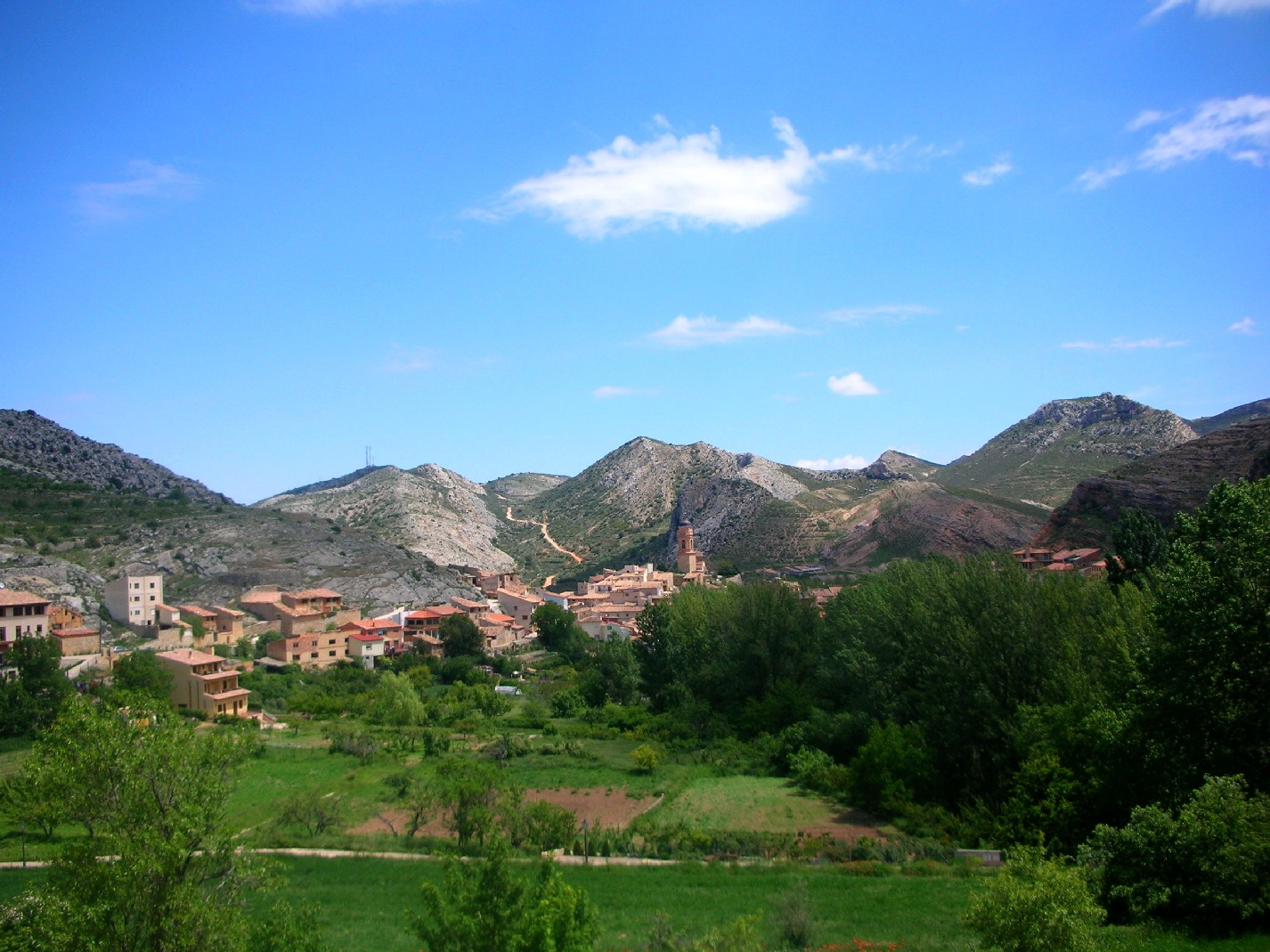
View of Molinos; the arid Sierra de Caballos, part of the Iberian System, rises behind the town

== Gallery ==
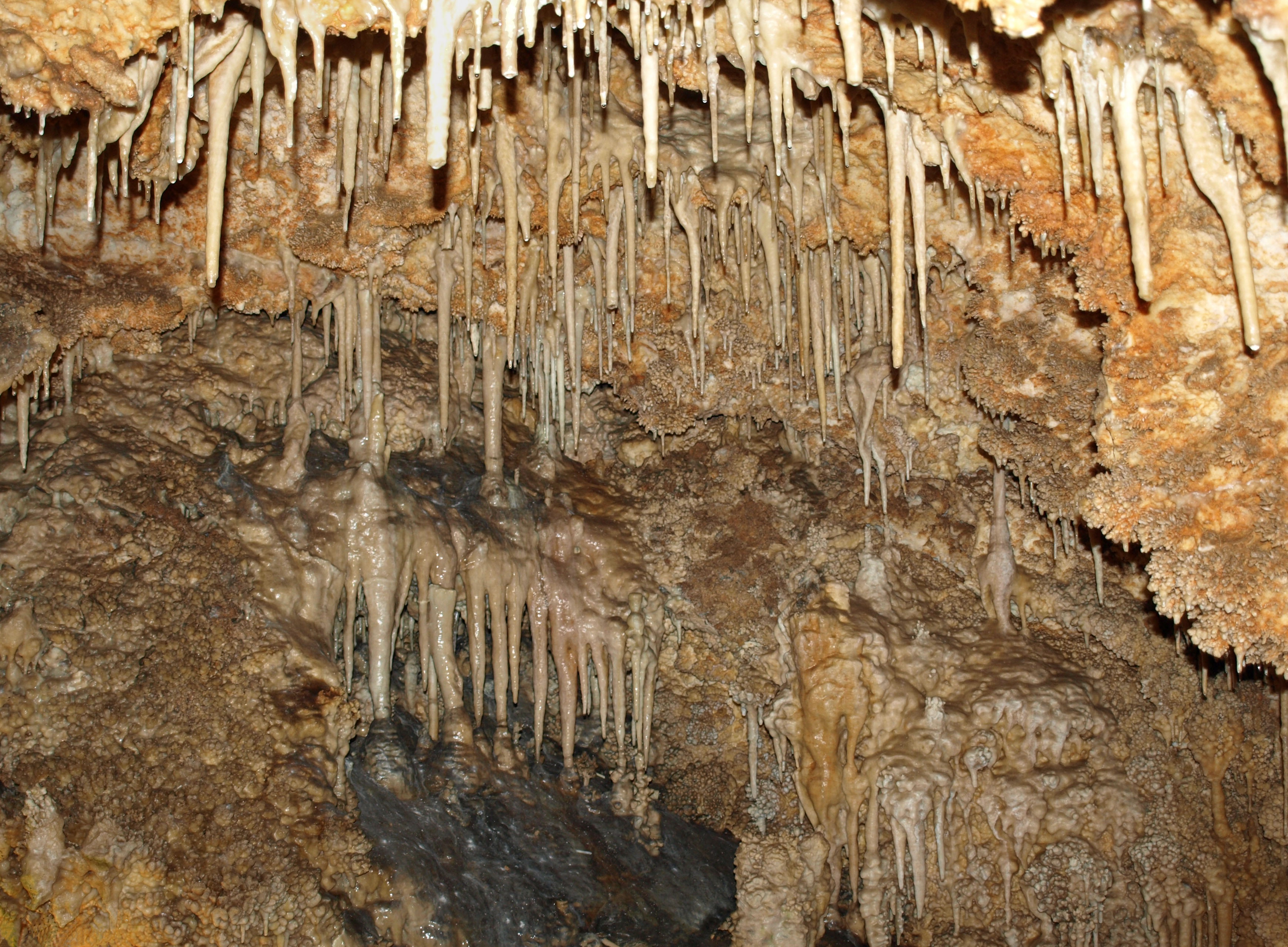
Grutas de Cristal stalactites

== See also ==
- Maestrazgo, Aragon
- List of municipalities in Teruel
