= Cañada de Benatanduz =

- municipality
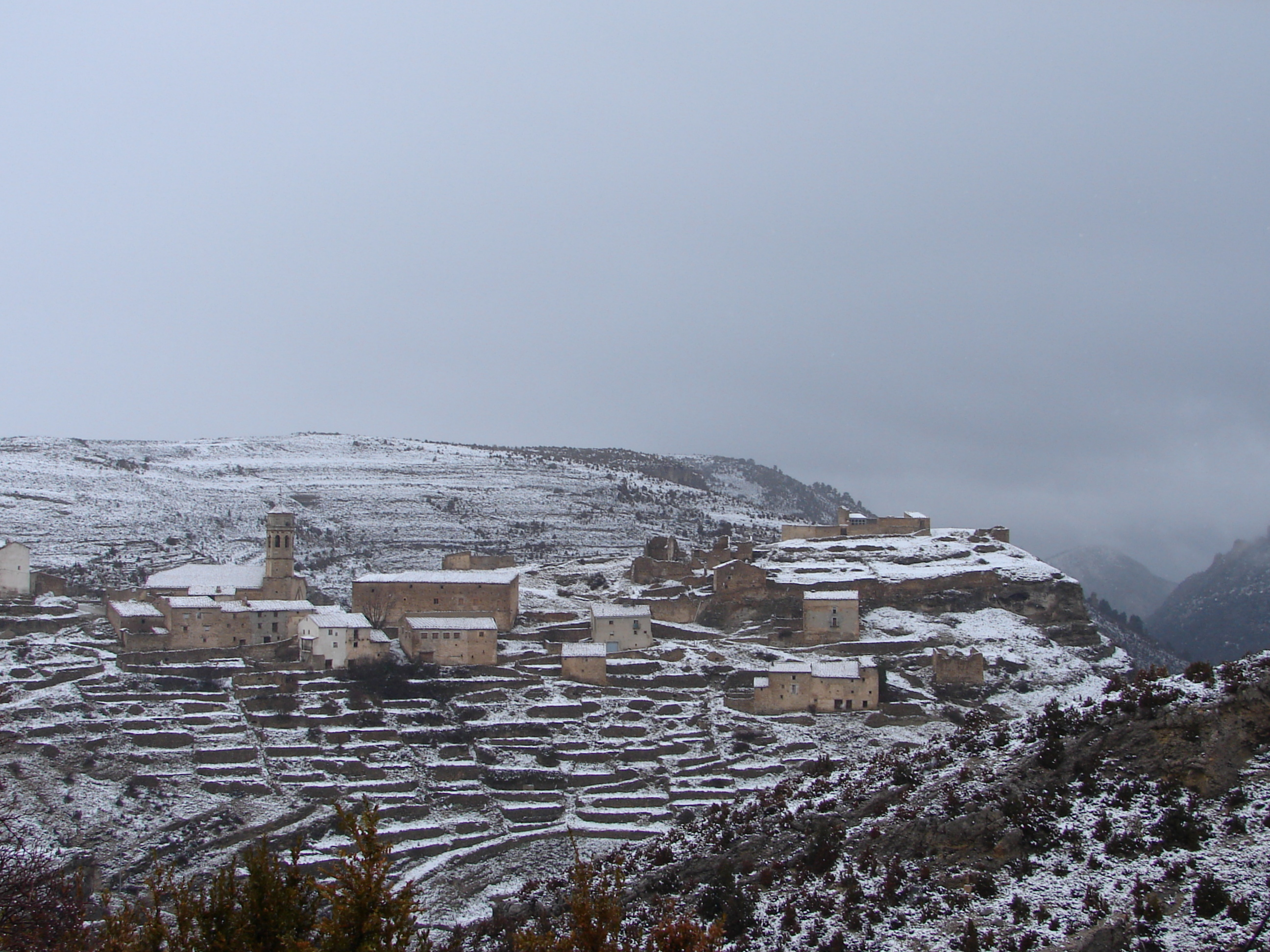

- Location within Spain
- Coordinates: 40°35′N 0°31′W
- Country: Spain
- Autonomous community: Aragon
- Province: Teruel
- Municipality: Cañada de Benatanduz

Area
  - Total: 34.89 km^{2} (13.47 sq mi)
- Elevation: 1,422 m (4,665 ft)

Population (2025-01-01)
  - Total: 40
  - Density: 1.1/km^{2} (3.0/sq mi)
- Time zone: UTC+1 (CET)
  - Summer (DST): UTC+2 (CEST)

Cañada de Benatanduz (Spanish pronunciation: [kaˈɲaða ðe βenatanˈduθ]) is a municipality located in the province of Teruel, Aragon, Spain. According to the 2004 census (INE), the municipality had a population of 64 inhabitants. It is located in the Sierra de la Cañada of the Iberian System.

== See also ==
- List of municipalities in Teruel
