= Luco (surname) =

Luco is a surname. Notable people with the surname include:

- Alberto Orrego Luco (1854–1931), Chilean landscape painter
- Ambrosio Montt Luco (1830–1899), Chilean politician and lawyer
- Ana Martinez de Luco (born 1960–61), Basque nun, sustainability advocate in New York City
- Ramón Barros Luco (1835–1919), President of Chile
- Ramón Briones Luco (1872–1949), Chilean politician

== Footballers ==
- Horacio Díaz Luco (born 1943), played for clubs in Chile, Costa Rica and El Salvador
- Roberto Luco (footballer, born 1907), played for various South American clubs and for Chile
- Roberto Luco (footballer, born 1985), played for Santiago Wanderers (Chile), amongst others
