= Fortanete =

- Municipality
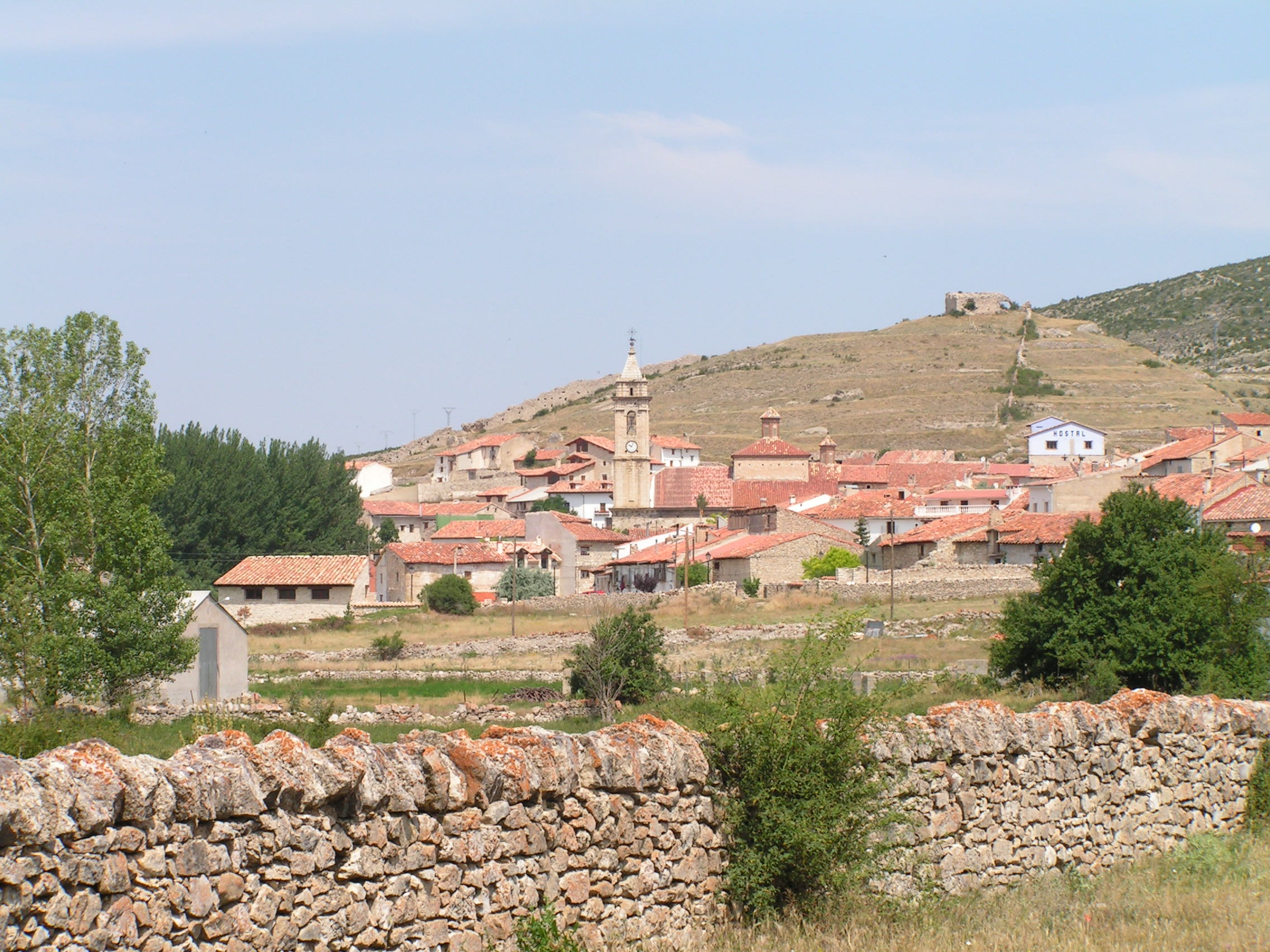

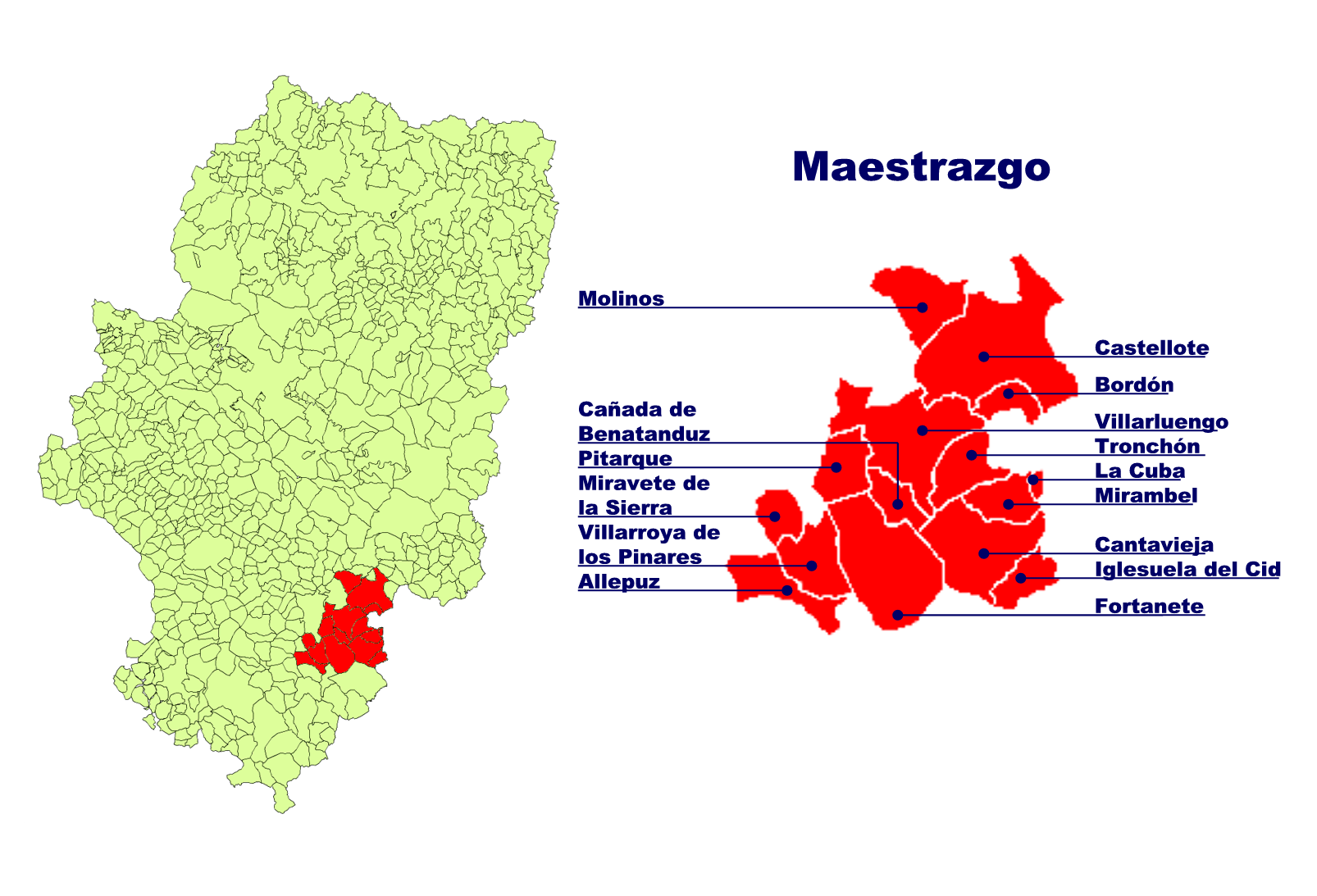

- Location in Spain
- Coordinates: 40°30′21″N 0°31′15″W
- Country: Spain
- Autonomous community: Aragón
- Province: Teruel
- Comarca: Maestrazgo
- Judicial district: Teruel
- Founded: 1169

Government
  - Alcaldesa: José Luis Monserrate Gil (2007) (PSOE)

Area
  - Total: 168.21 km^{2} (64.95 sq mi)
- Elevation: 1,353 m (4,439 ft)

Population (2025-01-01)
  - Total: 195
  - Density: 1.16/km^{2} (3.00/sq mi)
- Demonym(s): Fortanetino, -a
- Time zone: UTC+1 (CET)
  - Summer (DST): UTC+2 (CEST)
- Postal code: 44143
- Dialing code: 978
- Website: Official website

Fortanete is a municipality located in the province of Teruel, Aragon, Spain. According to the 2004 census (INE), the municipality has a population of 202 inhabitants.

== Demographics ==
Population trend since 1842.

== Photo gallery ==
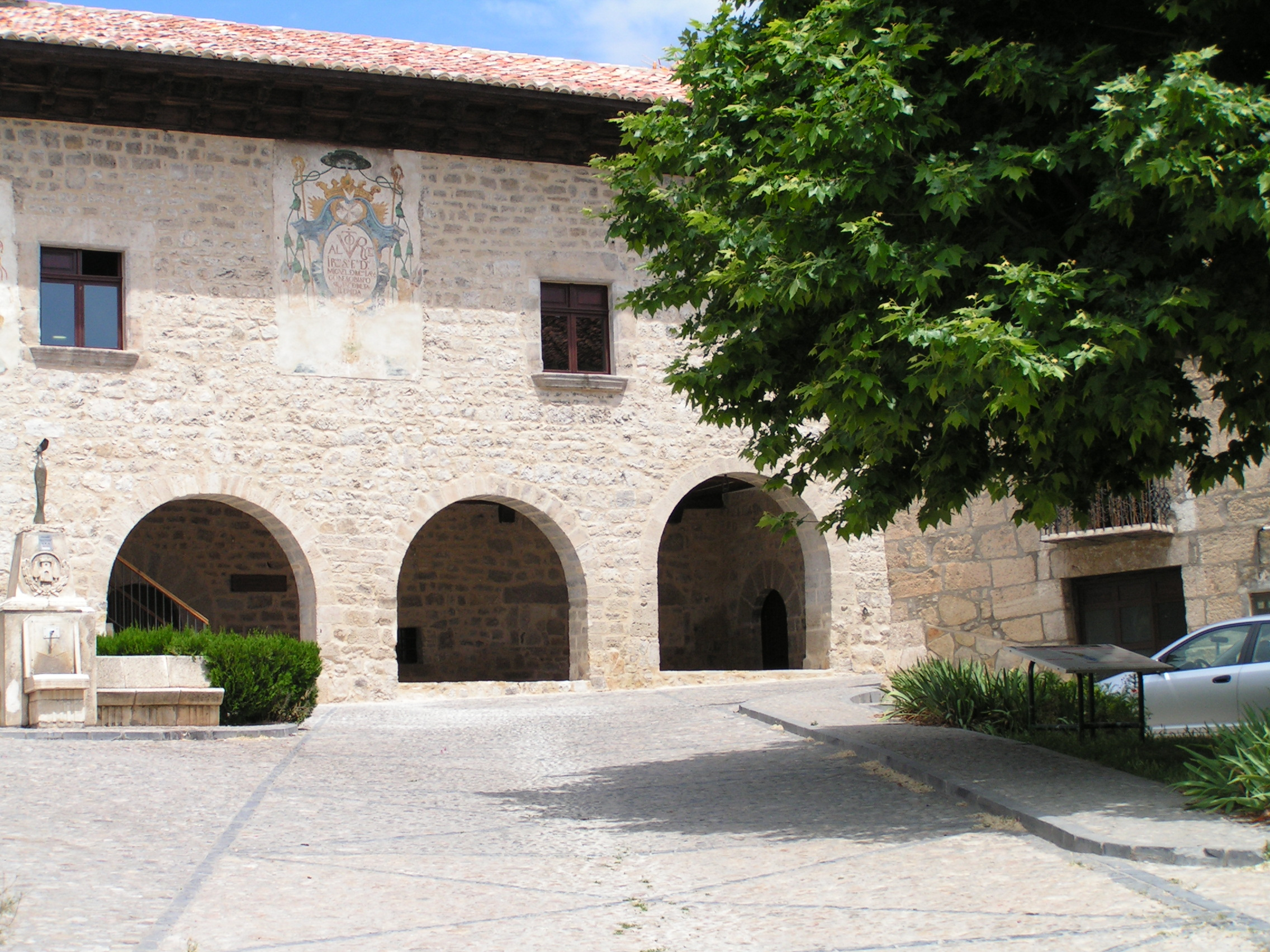
Town hall in Fortanete

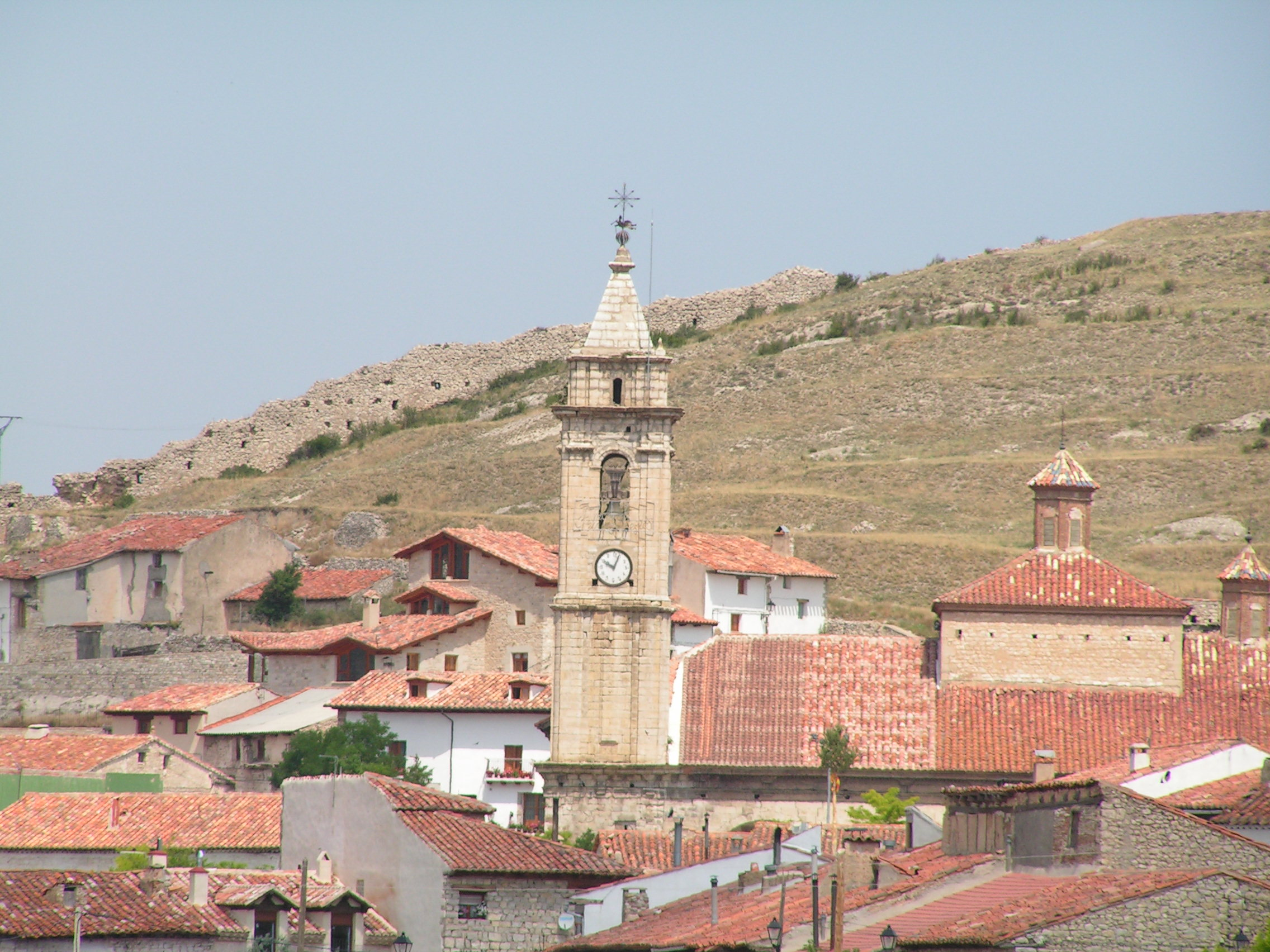
Belfry

== See also ==
- List of municipalities in Teruel
