= Bordón =

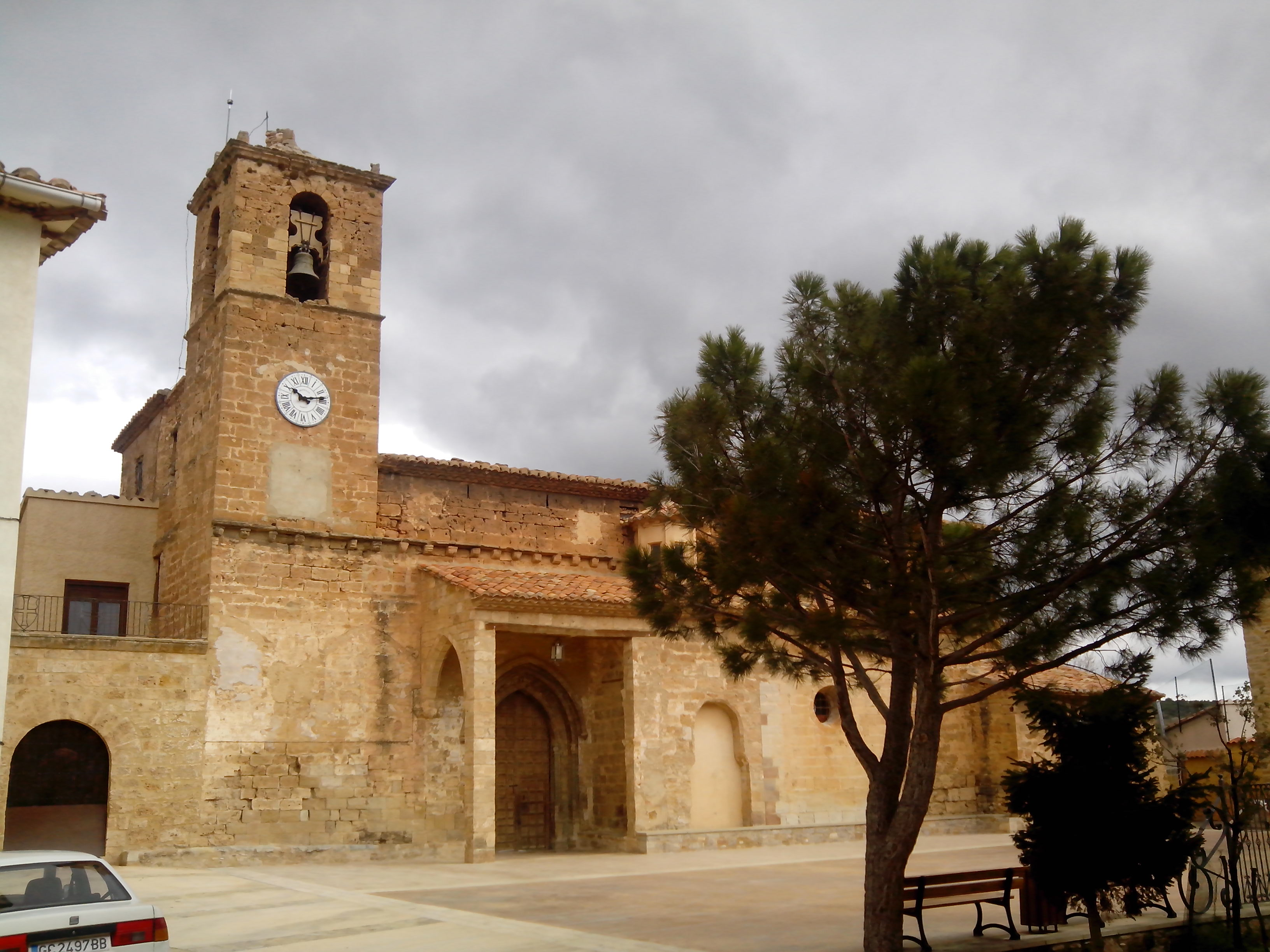

- Location within Spain
- Coordinates: 40°41′N 0°19′W
- Country: Spain
- Autonomous community: Aragon
- Province: Teruel
- Comarca: Maestrazgo, Aragon

Government
  - Alcalde: Álvaro Jarque Cardona

Area
  - Total: 29.98 km^{2} (11.58 sq mi)
- Elevation: 828 m (2,717 ft)

Population (2025-01-01)
  - Total: 116
  - Density: 3.87/km^{2} (10.0/sq mi)
- Demonym(s): Bordonero, -a
- Time zone: UTC+1 (CET)
  - Summer (DST): UTC+2 (CEST)

Bordón is a municipality located in the province of Teruel, Aragon, Spain. According to data collected in 2021 by the National Institute of Statistics in Spain, the municipality has a population of 116 inhabitants.

== Geography ==
Bordón has an altitude of approximately 828 m (2,717 ft), at a distance of 130 km (81 mi) from the capital of the province, Teruel.

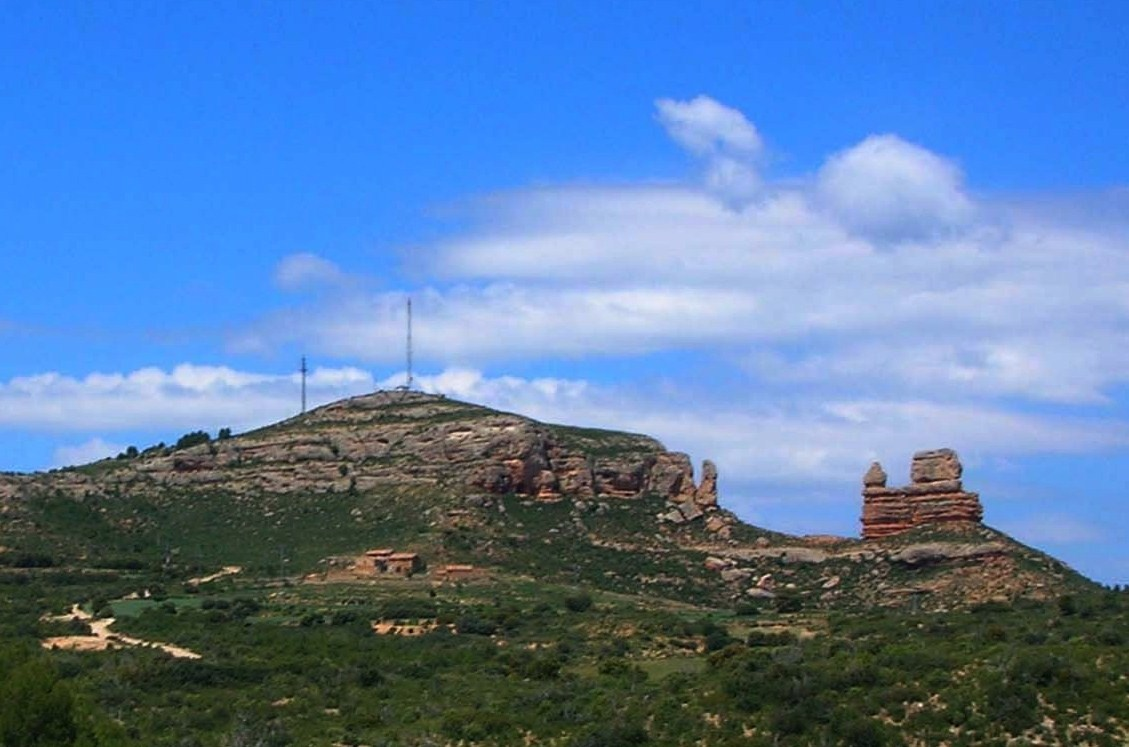
The Sierra Carrascosa with El Morrón rock formation is located very close to Bordón

== History ==
Likely of Carthaginian origin, the settlement was incorporated into the Castellote commandery by the Knights Templar in the late 12th century (around 1196). It was granted a Charter of Settlement in 1282.

In 1212, a shepherd is said to have discovered an image of the Virgin Mary hidden within a holm oak. A hermitage was built on the site, and by around 1306, the Templars decided to construct a larger church to accommodate the growing devotion to the Virgin of the Holm Oak. Over time, the town of Bordón developed around the church.

By the mid-19th century, Bordón, by then an independent municipality, had a recorded population of 440 inhabitants.

== Demographics ==
Bordón has a population of 116.

demographic vertical bar chart of Bordón between 1842 and 2021

== See also ==
- Maestrazgo, Aragon
- List of municipalities in Teruel

== Sources ==
- Madoz, Pascual (1846). "Bordon". Diccionario geográfico-estadístico-histórico de España y sus posesiones de Ultramar (in Spanish). Vol. IV. Madrid. pp. 405–406.
