= Castellote =

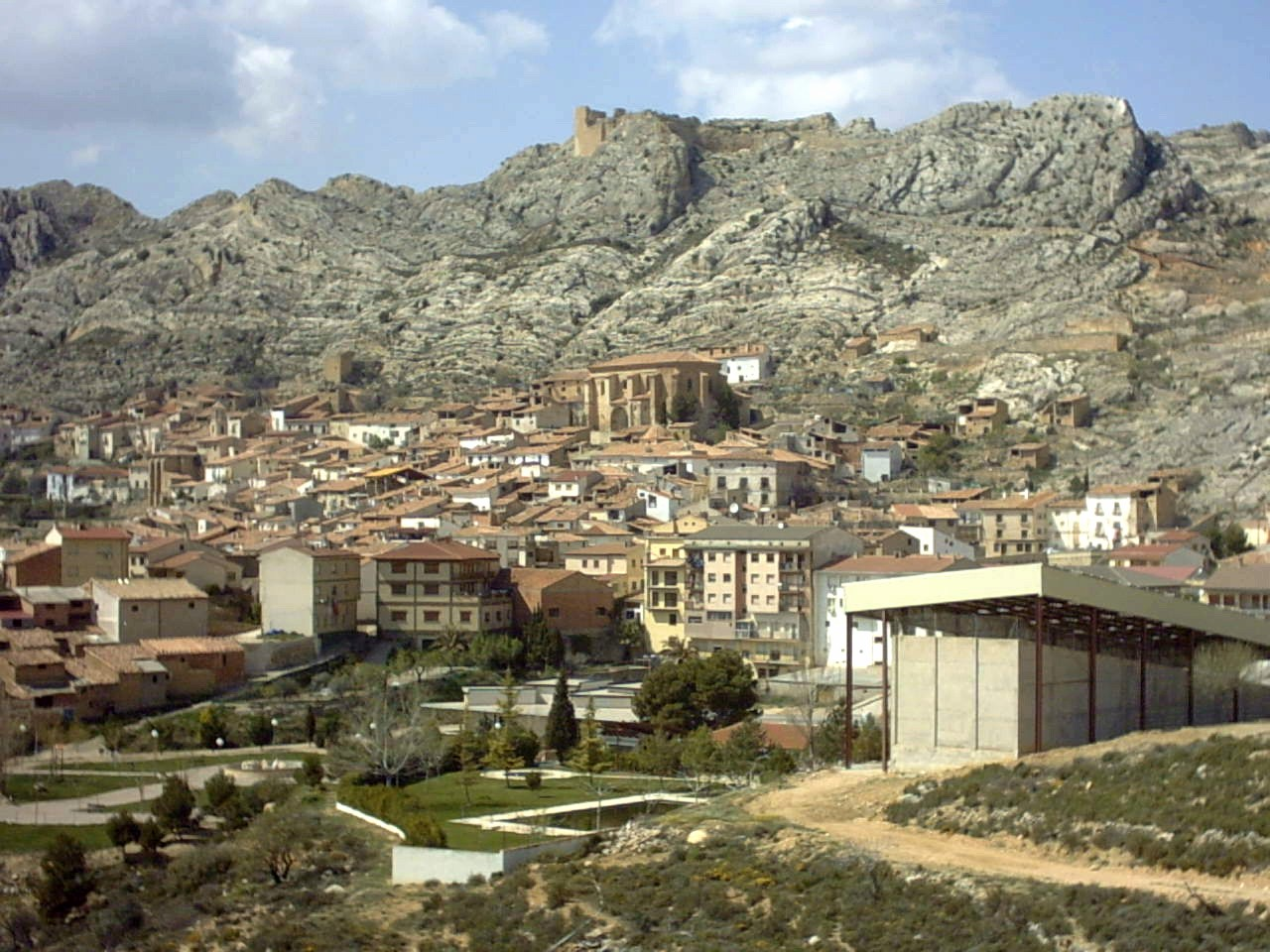

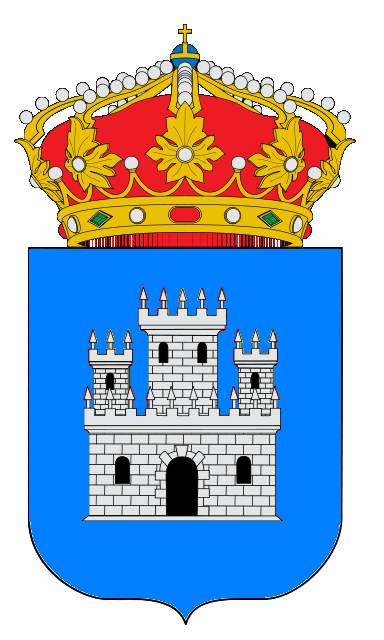
- Coat of arms

- Location within Spain
- Coordinates: 40°48′N 0°19′W
- Country: Spain
- Autonomous community: Aragon
- Province: Teruel
- Comarca: Maestrazgo, Aragon

Area
  - Total: 235.18 km^{2} (90.80 sq mi)
- Elevation: 804 m (2,638 ft)

Population (2025-01-01)
  - Total: 665
  - Density: 2.83/km^{2} (7.32/sq mi)
- Time zone: UTC+1 (CET)
  - Summer (DST): UTC+2 (CEST)

Castellote is a municipality located in the province of Teruel, Aragon, Spain. According to the 2010 census, the municipality has a population of 804 inhabitants.

Situated in a picturesque setting on the slope of a mountain crowned by a Templar castle ruined in the Carlist Wars. The road enters the village through a tunnel that pierces an impressive rock wall. At the entrance of the tunnel is the site of Llovedor with the shrine of the Llovedor.

From its medieval past, linked to the Knights Templar, it has retained a beautiful urban area of narrow streets and steep, with an expansion along the road which is declared cultural interest. Are of great interest the Gothic church of San Miguel, the town hall with arcades, the shrine of the Virgen del Agua, the Gothic fountain and some houses emblazoned. Near the town is the castle, the medieval aqueduct and the chapel of Llovedor.

== Villages ==
In Castellote's extensive municipal term are located many populated and depopulated places that have had relevance in the past. Among the populated are:

- Abenfigo
- Los Alagones
- La Algecira
- El Crespol
- Cuevas de Cañart
- Dos Torres de Mercader
- Ladruñán
- Luco de Bordón
- Las Planas de Castellote
- Mas de Ricol

Uninhabited or virtually uninhabited, are the nuclei of many farms, including: El Alconzal, El Huergo, El Mas de Blasco, Torremocha, Perojil, el Mas de Soler, el Mas de Lej, El Higueral, El Latonar and other. Some were inundated by reservoir waters Santolea, like Mas de Campos, and the village which gives its name, Santolea, was abandoned and demolished after construction.

== See also ==
- List of municipalities in Teruel
