= Gúdar-Javalambre =

Coordinates: 40°15′11″N 0°45′9″W

- Comarca
- Interactive map of Gúdar-Javalambre
- Country: Spain
- Autonomous community: Aragon
- Province: Teruel
- Capital: Mora de Rubielos
- Municipalities: List: See text

Area
  - Total: 2,351.6 km^{2} (908.0 sq mi)

Population (2015)
  - Total: 7,689
  - Density: 3.270/km^{2} (8.468/sq mi)
- Time zone: UTC+1 (CET)
  - Summer (DST): UTC+2 (CEST)
- Largest municipality: Mora de Rubielos

Gúdar-Javalambre is a comarca in Aragon, Spain. The most important town is Mora de Rubielos.

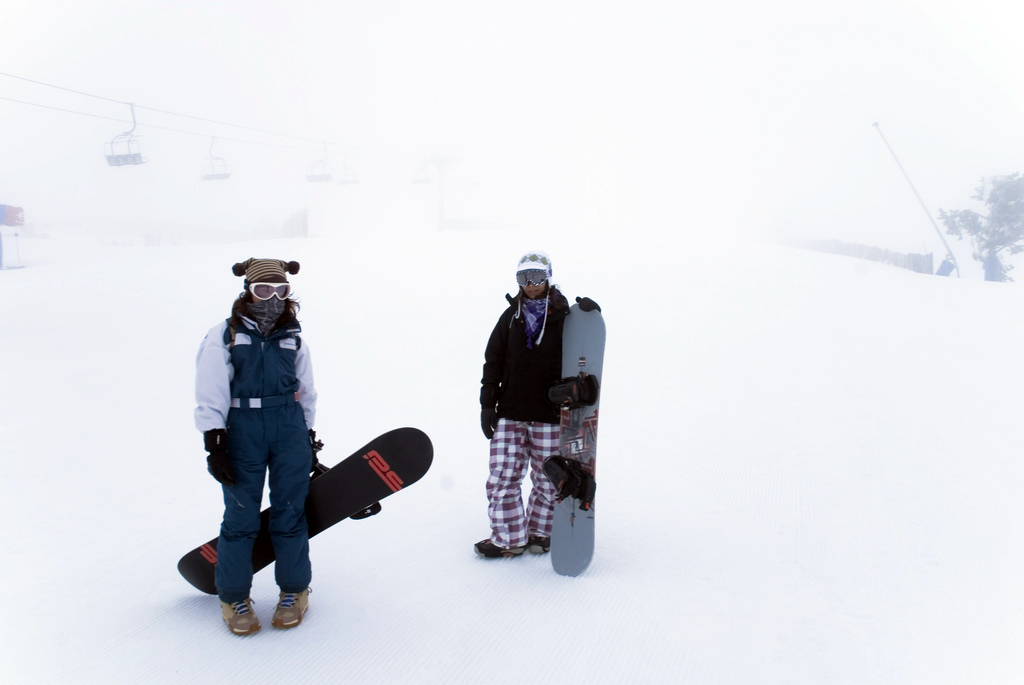
Snowboarders in Aramón Javalambre.

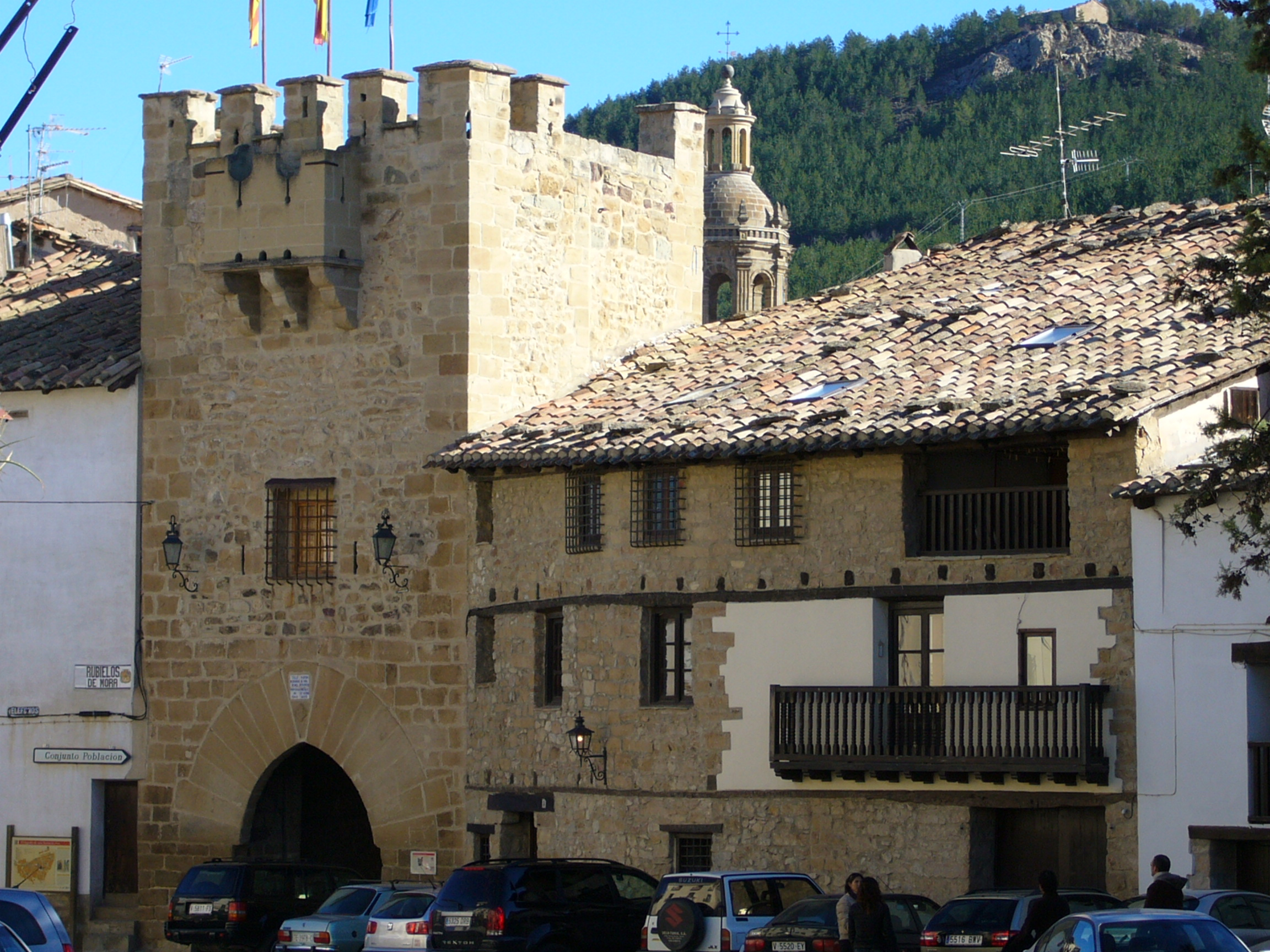
Old buildings in Rubielos de Mora.

This comarca is located at the southern end of Aragon, bordering the Valencian Community. The area is mountainous with the summits of the Sistema Ibérico rising over towns with little or very little population in which the agricultural houses of the former villages have become summerhouses.

== Tourism ==
The Sierra de Gúdar and the Sierra de Javalambre dominate the landscape and give their name to the comarca. The summits are covered in snow in the winter. The Aramón Javalambre ski resort is located in this comarca.

The region includes several sites of religious and historical significance, such as the Sanctuary of the Virgin of the Star in the abandoned hamlet of La Estrella.

== Municipalities ==
- Abejuela, 65
- Albentosa, 299
- Alcalá de la Selva, 499
- Arcos de las Salinas, 127
- Cabra de Mora, 115
- Camarena de la Sierra, 159
- El Castellar, 77
- Formiche Alto, 202
- Fuentes de Rubielos, 117
- Gúdar, 100
- Linares de Mora, 320
- Manzanera, 516
- Mora de Rubielos, 1,553
- Mosqueruela, 703
- Nogueruelas, 223
- Olba, 233
- La Puebla de Valverde, 551
- Puertomingalvo, 190
- Rubielos de Mora, 699
- San Agustín, 142
- Sarrión, 1.072
- Torrijas, 86
- Valbona, 216
- Valdelinares, 134

== See also ==
- Maestrazgo
- Comarcas of Aragon
