= Sierra de Gúdar =

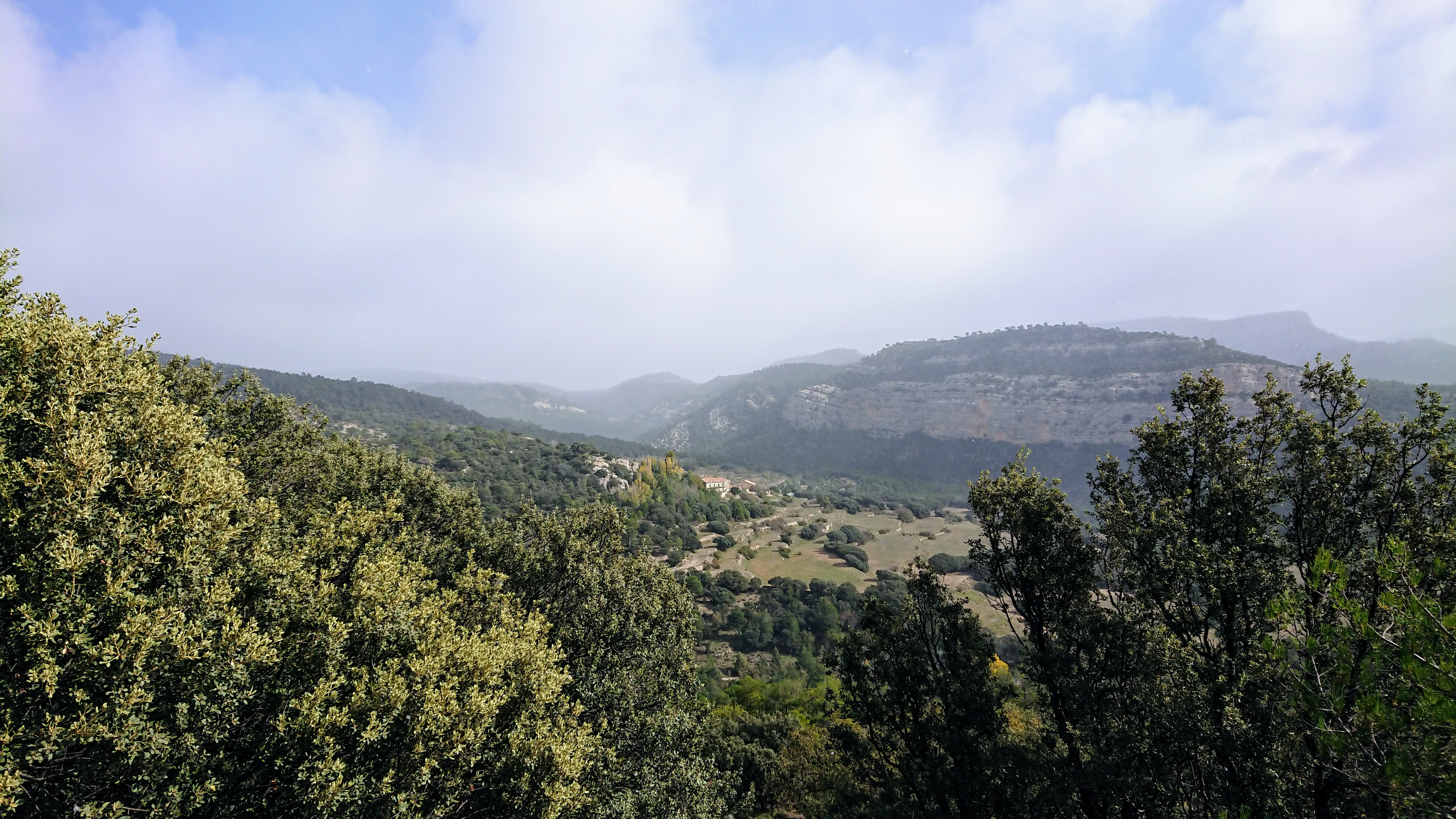
- View near Nogueruelas, Teruel.

Highest point
- Peak: Peñarroya
- Elevation: 2,019 m (6,624 ft)
- Listing: Mountains of Aragon, List of mountains in the Valencian Community
- Coordinates: 40°22′25″N 0°37′56″W

Geography
- Location within Spain
- Location: Gúdar-Javalambre, Maestrazgo, Aragon; Alto Mijares, Valencian Community
- Parent range: Iberian System, Eastern zone

Geology
- Mountain type: Limestone (Post-Miocene)

Climbing
- Easiest route: From the towns of Valdelinares, Rubielos de Mora, Linares de Mora or Mosqueruela

Sierra de Gúdar is a mountain range in the Gúdar-Javalambre and Maestrazgo comarcas of Aragon and the Alto Mijares comarca of the Valencian Community, Spain. The highest point in the range is Peñarroya (2,019 m).

== Geography ==
This mountain range is located at the eastern end of the Iberian System and the Sierra de Nogueruelas is its easternmost prolongation. The Sierra Mayabona is another subrange of the Sierra de Gúdar.

Its summits are usually covered in snow in the winter and the 1710 m high Cabezo de las Cruces is one of the highest peaks of the Land of Valencia.

Mora de Rubielos is the most important town in this mountainous zone. The range is named after the town of Gúdar. Valdelinares, also a village in the area, is the highest town in Spain among those which are head of a municipality.

== See also ==
- List of mountains in Aragon
- Mountains of the Valencian Community
