= Rubielos =

Rubielos is the name of several towns in Spain:

- Rubielos de Mora, a town in the province of Teruel, Aragon
- Rubielos de la Cérida, a town in the province of Teruel, Aragon

See also:

- Mora de Rubielos, a town in the province of Teruel, Aragon
- Fuentes de Rubielos, a town in the province of Teruel, Aragon
