= Formiche Alto =

- municipality
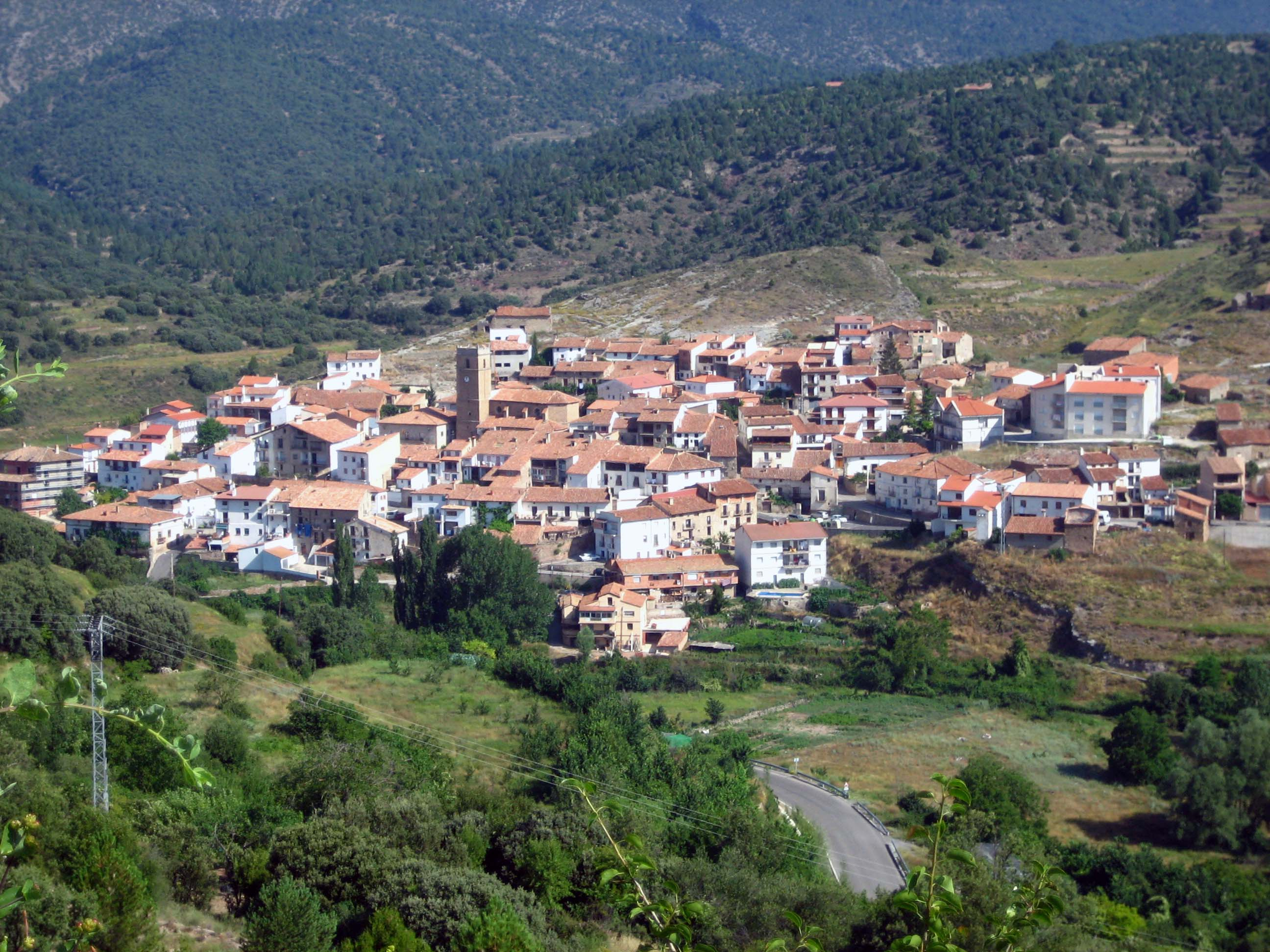

- Flag Coat of arms

- Location within Spain
- Coordinates: 40°19′N 0°54′W
- Country: Spain
- Autonomous community: Aragon
- Province: Teruel subdivision_type3 = Comarca

Area
  - Total: 78.17 km^{2} (30.18 sq mi)
- Elevation: 1,108 m (3,635 ft)

Population (2025-01-01)
  - Total: 156
  - Density: 2.00/km^{2} (5.17/sq mi)
- Time zone: UTC+1 (CET)
  - Summer (DST): UTC+2 (CEST)

Formiche Alto is a municipality located in the province of Teruel, Aragon, Spain. According to the 2004 census (INE), the municipality had a population of 191 inhabitants. According to the 2010 census, the municipality has a population of 190 inhabitants. Its postal code is 44440

This town is located in the Gúdar-Javalambre comarca, at the feet of the Sierra de Camarena, Sistema Ibérico.

== See also ==
- Gúdar-Javalambre
- List of municipalities in Teruel
