= Librilla =

- Municipality
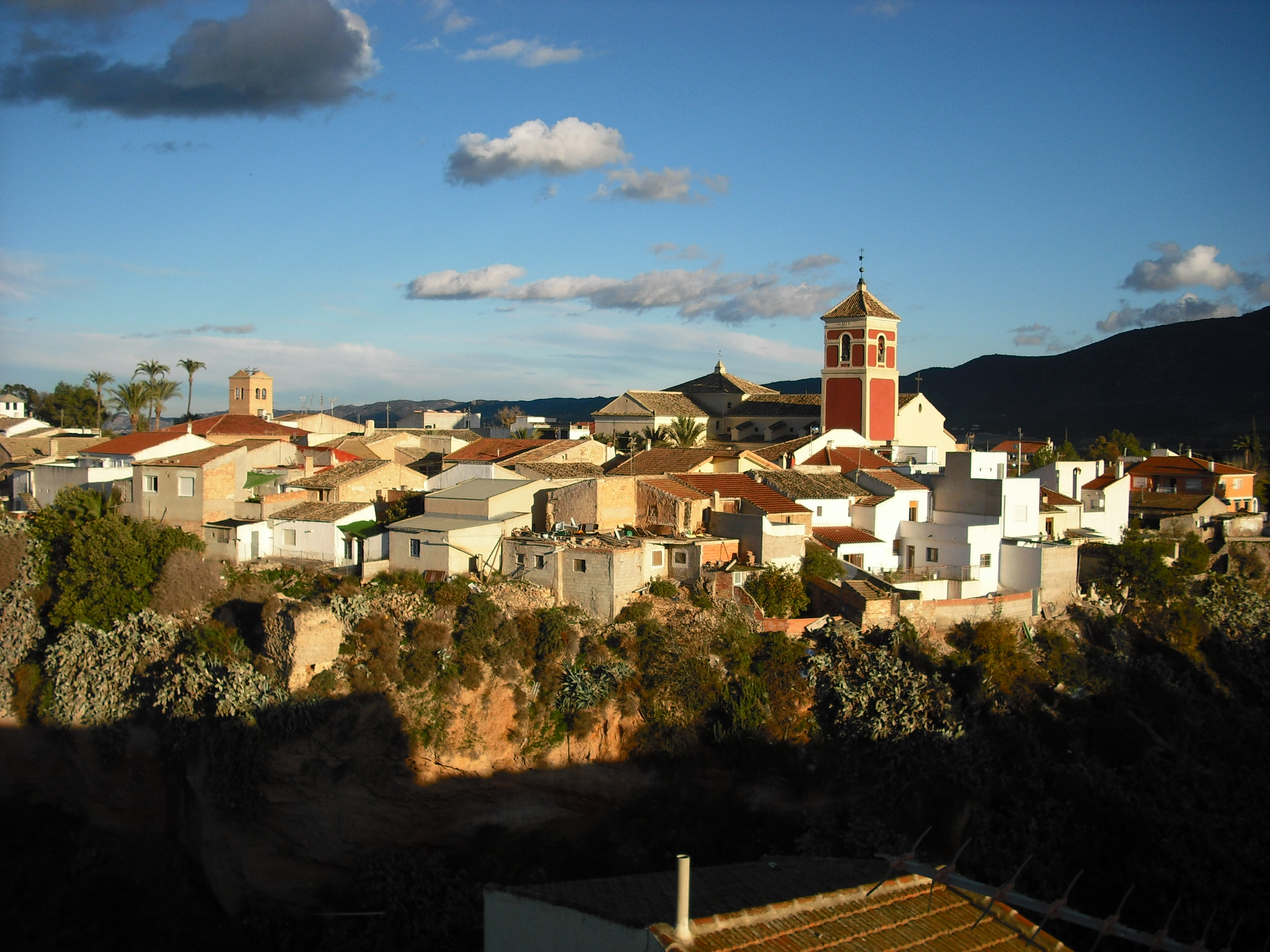

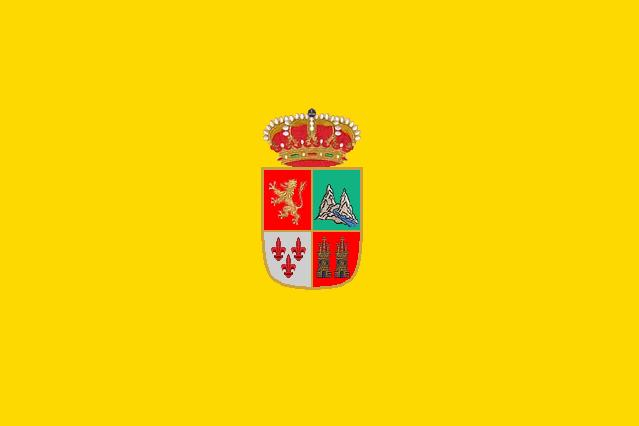
- Flag Coat of arms

- Location in Murcia

- Location in Murcia Location in Spain
- Country: Spain
- Autonomous community: Murcia
- Province: Murcia
- Comarca: Bajo Guadalentin
- Judicial district: Totana

Government
  - Mayor: José Martínez García (2007) (Mixed Group)

Area
  - Total: 56 km^{2} (22 sq mi)
- Elevation: 178 m (584 ft)

Population (2025-01-01)
  - Total: 5,854
  - Density: 100/km^{2} (270/sq mi)
- Demonym(s): Librillano, na
- Time zone: UTC+1 (CET)
  - Summer (DST): UTC+2 (CEST)
- Postal code: 30892
- Website: Official website

Librilla is a Spanish village in the Murcia region. It had a population of 4614 in 2010 and an area of 56 km^{2}. It's placed in both sides of the Orón river.

== Geography ==
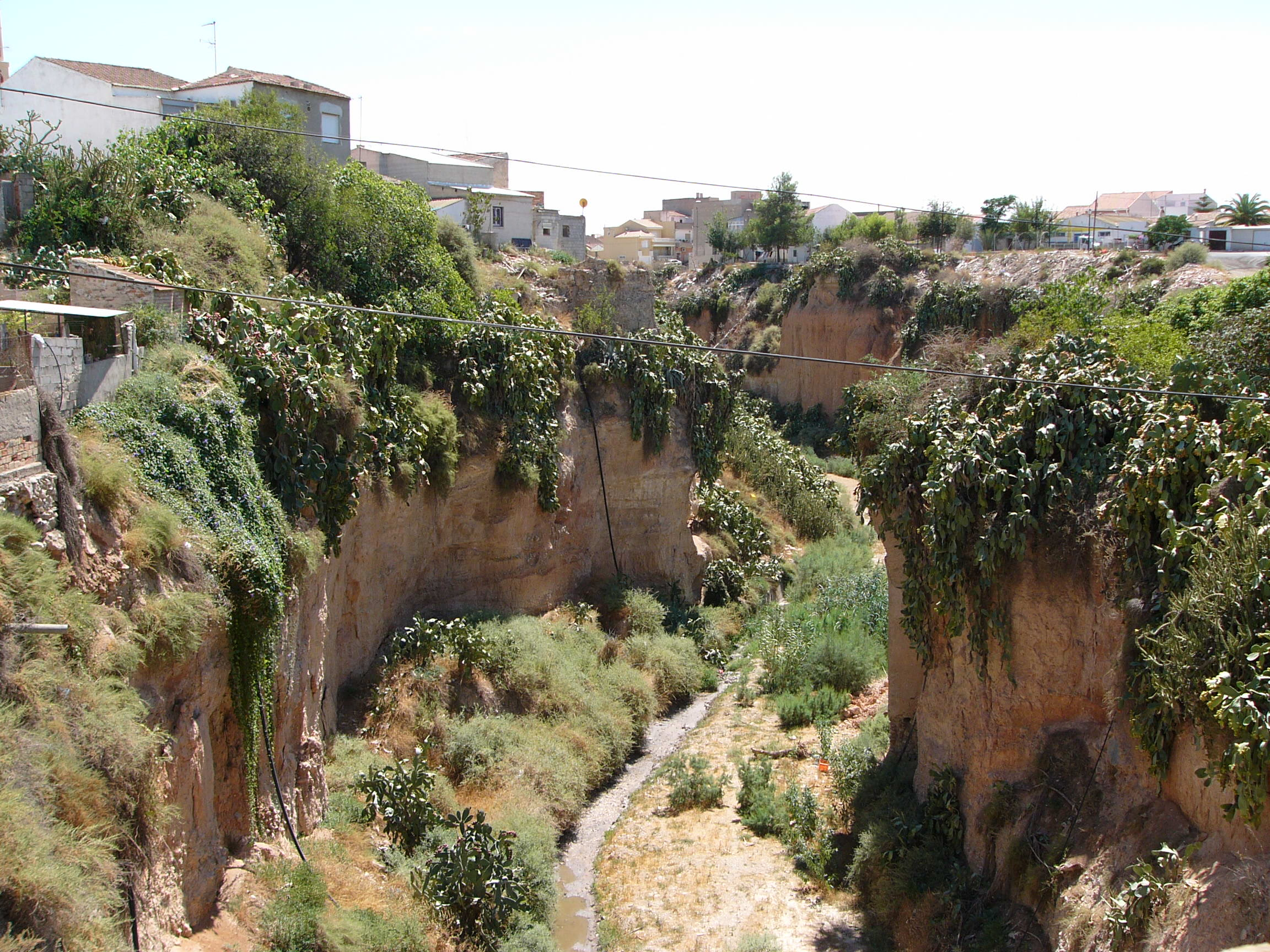
The Oron river (Barranco de los Espectros) seen from the road's bridge.

Librilla is located next to the Algecira's stream and it's crossed by the Oron river. It's situated in the shadow of Sierra de Carrascoy and the slopes of El Castellar, bordering the municipalities of Murcia to the north and east, north by Mula and Alhama de Murcia to the south and west.

== History ==
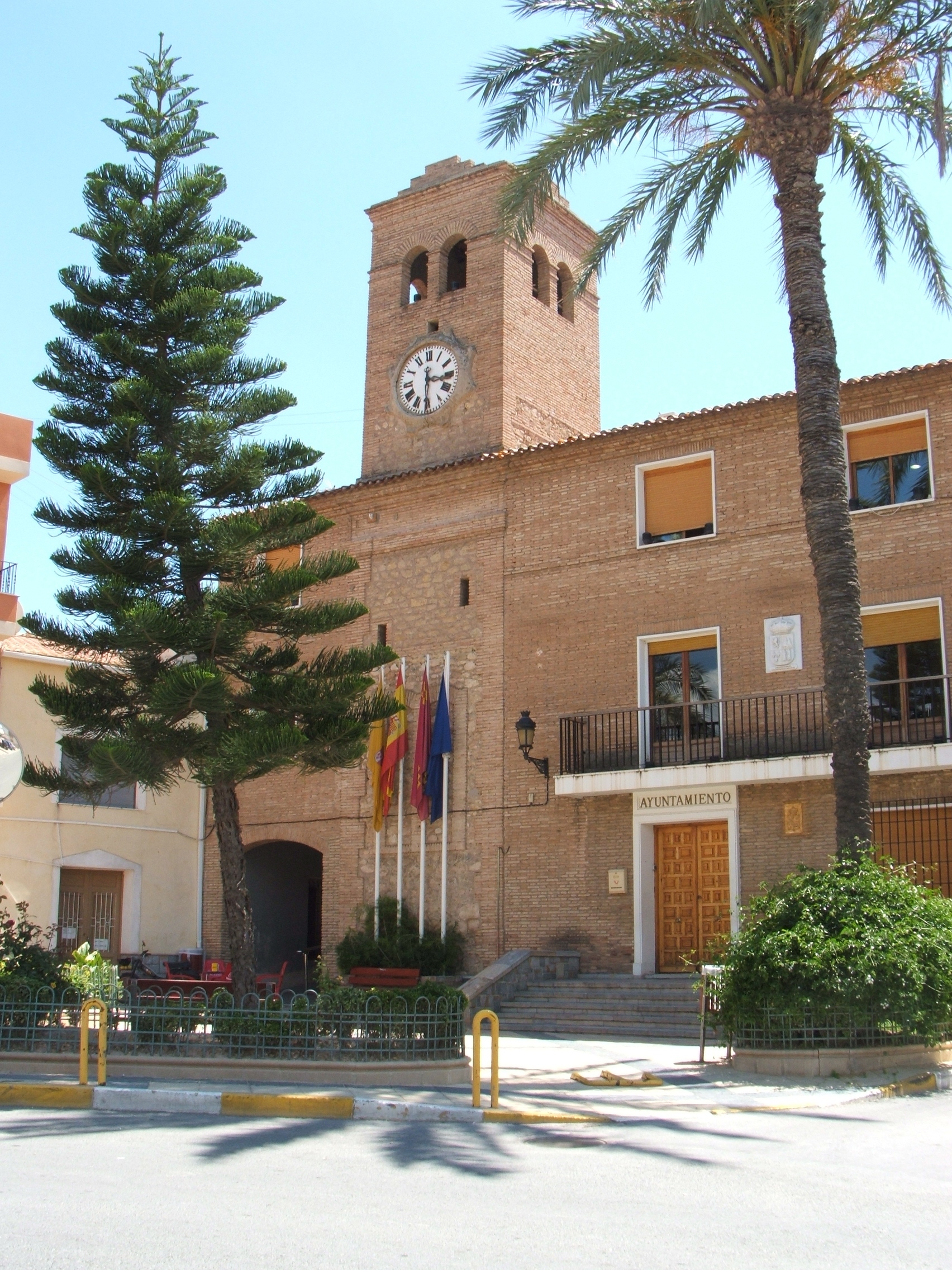
Town Hall.

Librilla's history dates back from Iberians time, which left the remains of a settlement in El Castellar. The name of this town gave it the Arab geographer Al-Idrissi, in the 12th century, called "Lymbraya", which in Arabic means "Ghost's stream" (Barranco de los Espectros). In 1243, after Muslim rule Librilla along with the rest of the Kingdom of Murcia is delivered as a protectorate of the future Alfonso X of Castile, then infant, through the surrender of Alcaraz. In times of Alfonso XI, Juan Manuel, governor of the King of Castile in the Kingdom of Murcia, Librilla inherited as part of the estates belonging to his father.

== Demographics ==
Demographic evolution
1900	1910	1920	1930	1940	1950	1960	1970	1981	1991	1996	2001	2004	2005	2006	2007	2010
2.465	3.379	3.035	2.886	2.807	2.981	2.826	3.111	3.512	3.735	3.759	3.945	4.088	4.160	4.297	4.378	4.614

== Main sights ==
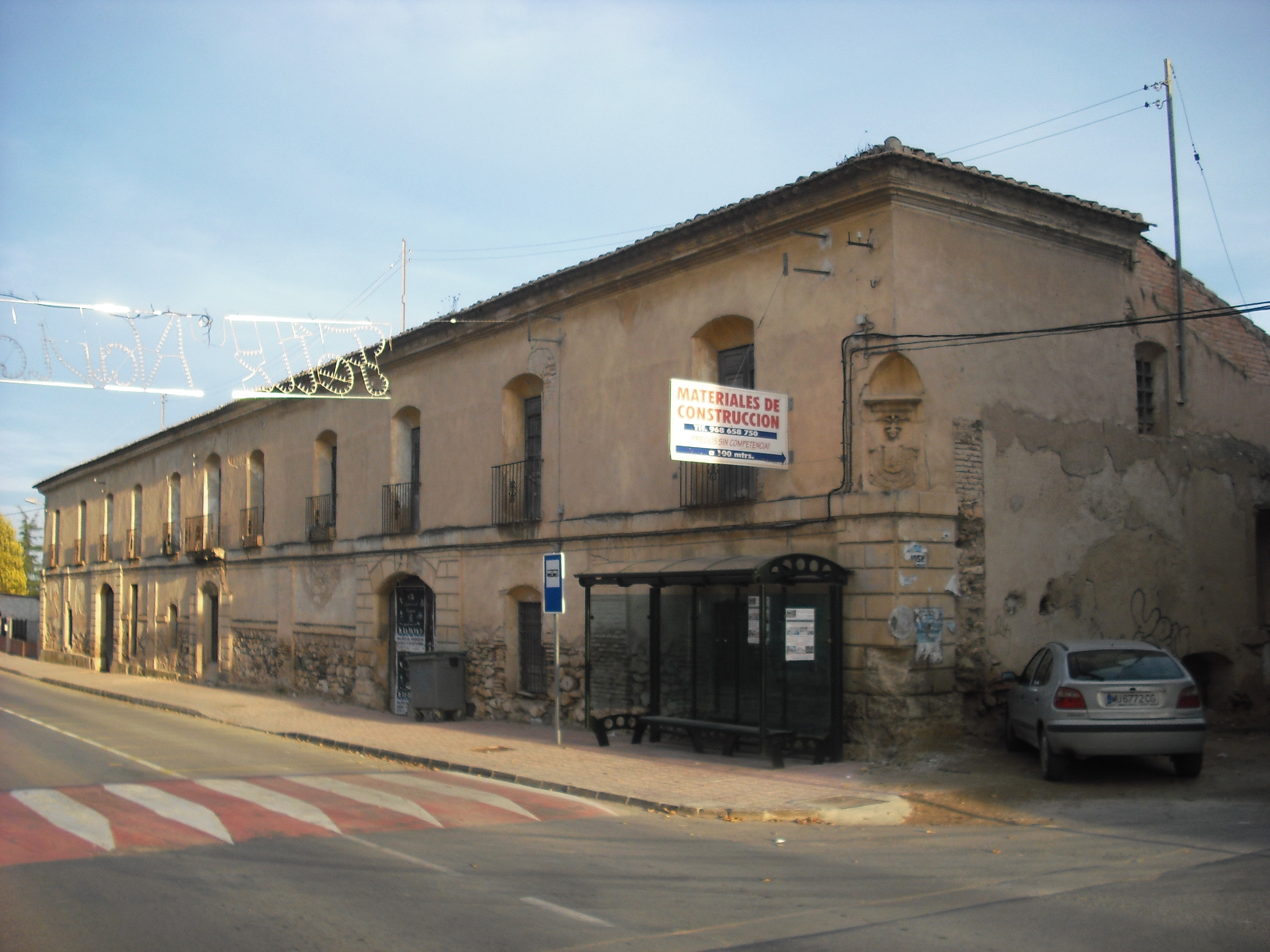
Las Posadas

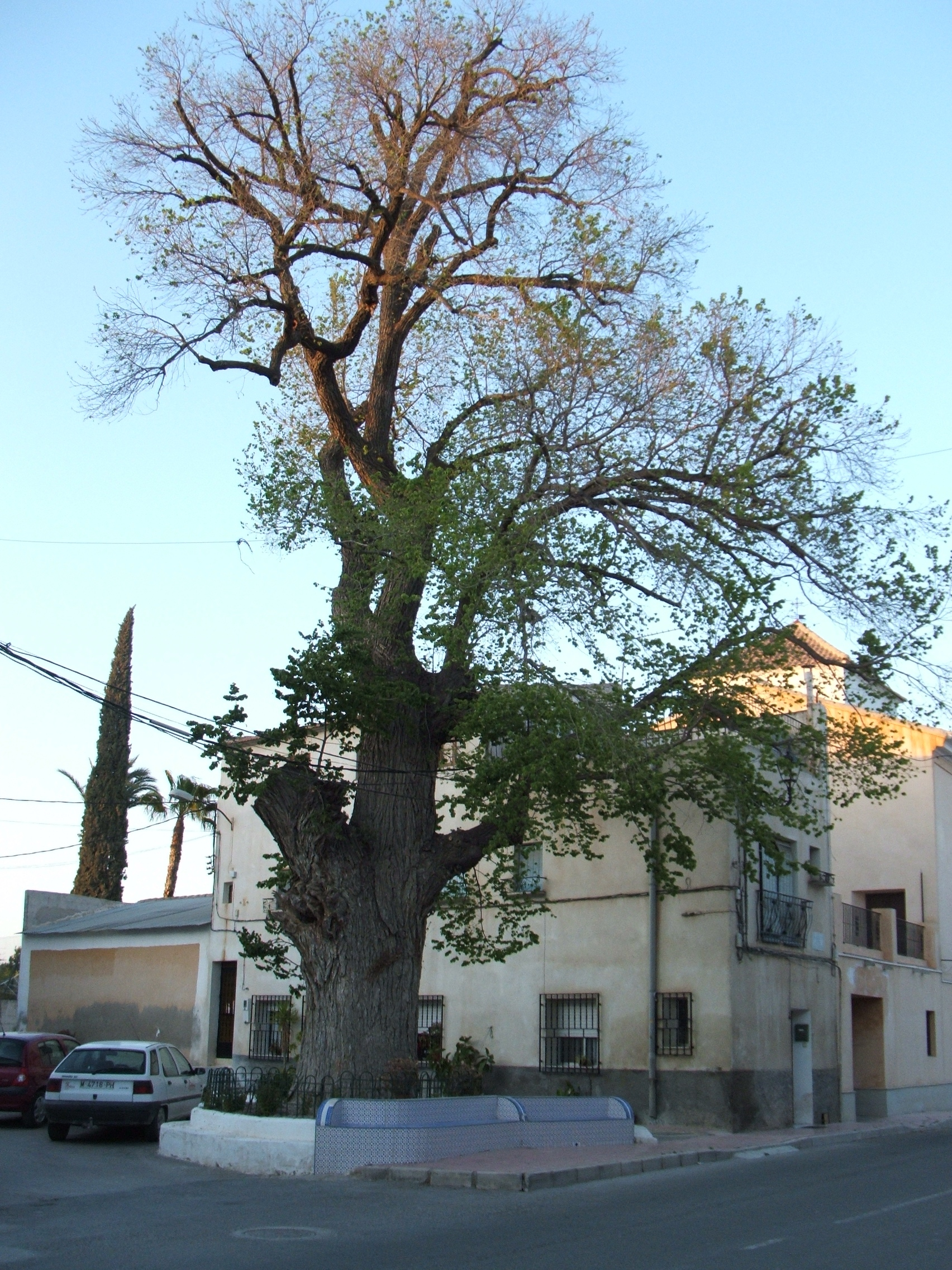
Centenary elm

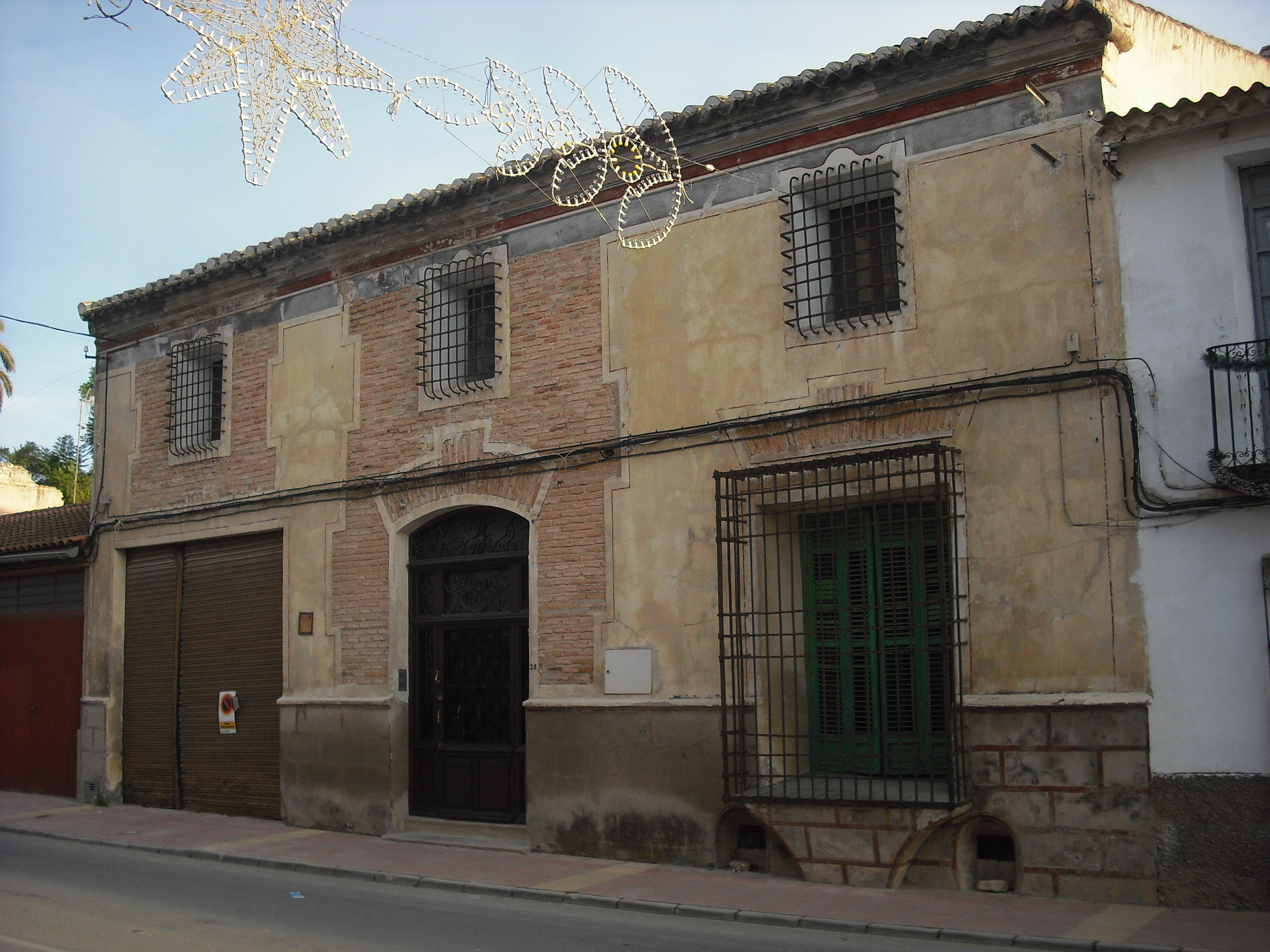
Caseron Marques de Camachos

The most notable places in Librilla include:

- San Bartolome's Church;
- The Town Hall;
- Castle's ruins;
- Sagrado Corazon's Park, always know how "El Monumento";
- "Caseron Marques de Camachos";
- "Las Posadas";
- Rosalía's Manor (Casa Méndez);
- Centenary elm in El Lavdor;

== Economy ==
The main economic activity is agriculture Librilla with irrigated orchards, especially the production of lemons. Librilla industrial production is very recent, from the construction of industrial estate "Cabecicos Blancos", situated along the Mediterranean motorway, 20 km from Murcia. The polygon has an area of 750,000 m2 of industrial land and 512,000 m2 of building land and has good access.

== Gastronomy ==
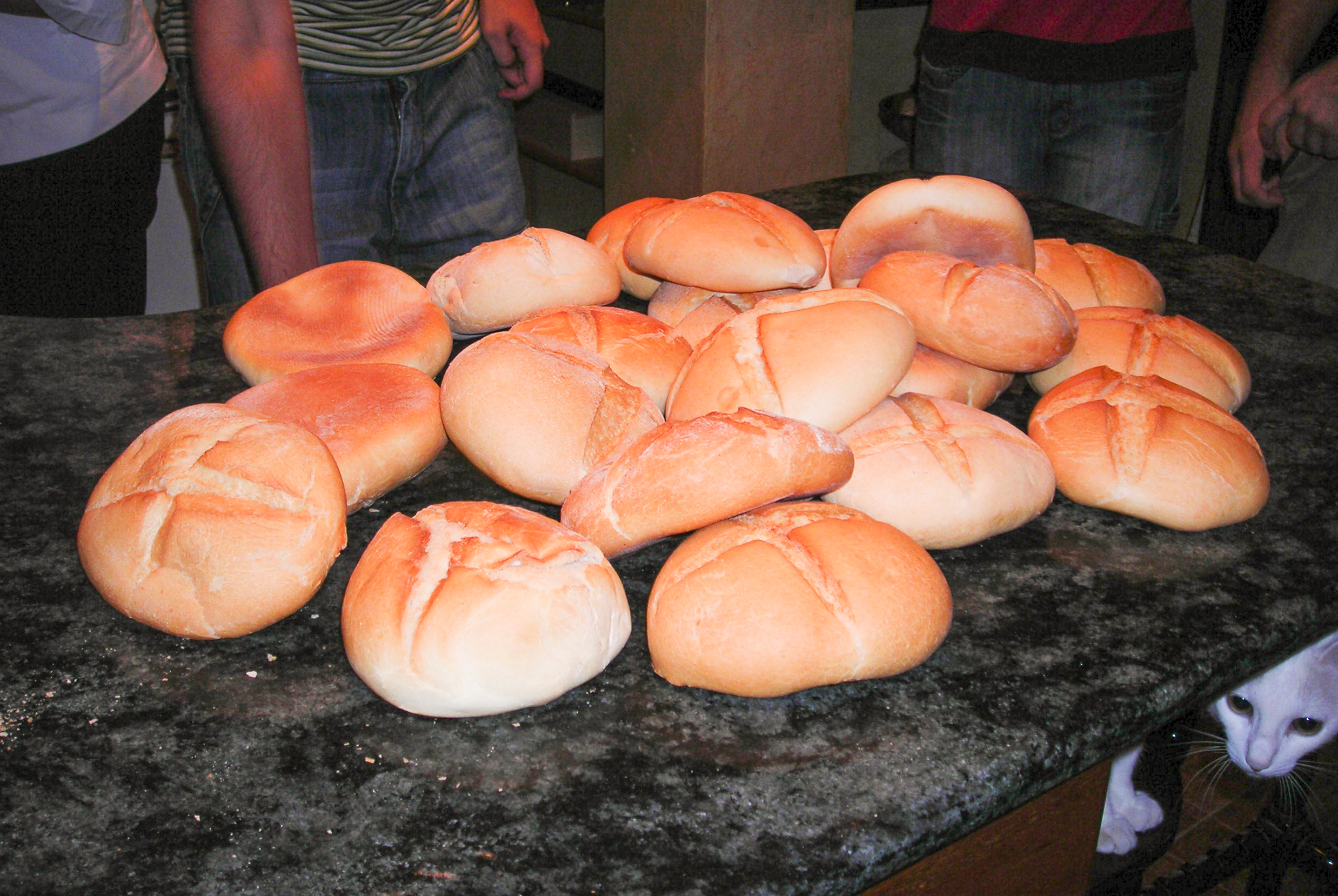
Pitanzas

The main dishes of local cuisine are rice with rabbit, stew, crumbs, michirones (dried beans cooked with ham and sausages), rabbit with garlic and the pot of cooked pork. One type of traditional bread called pitanza, which weighs 200 grams and is released thousands from the balcony of City Hall every 22 August. This is a unique event both regionally and nationally originated in medieval times.

== Holidays ==
- May 2–3: "Festividad de la Santa Cruz".
- July 16: Carmen's Virgin.
- August 2: Our Lady of Angels.
- August 18–24: "Fiestas patronales en honor a San Bartolomé".
- September 8: Pilgrimage to the shrine of Our Lady of Bethlehem that begins, in alternate years, in Librilla or in Sangonera la Seca.

== Celebrities born in Librilla ==
- Antonio Soto Alcón (1952-), painter, he received the «European painter 2005» award from European Parliament.

== Sister cities ==
- Saint-Jean-de-Védas (France)

== See also ==
- List of municipalities in the Region of Murcia
