= Cabra de Mora =

- Municipality
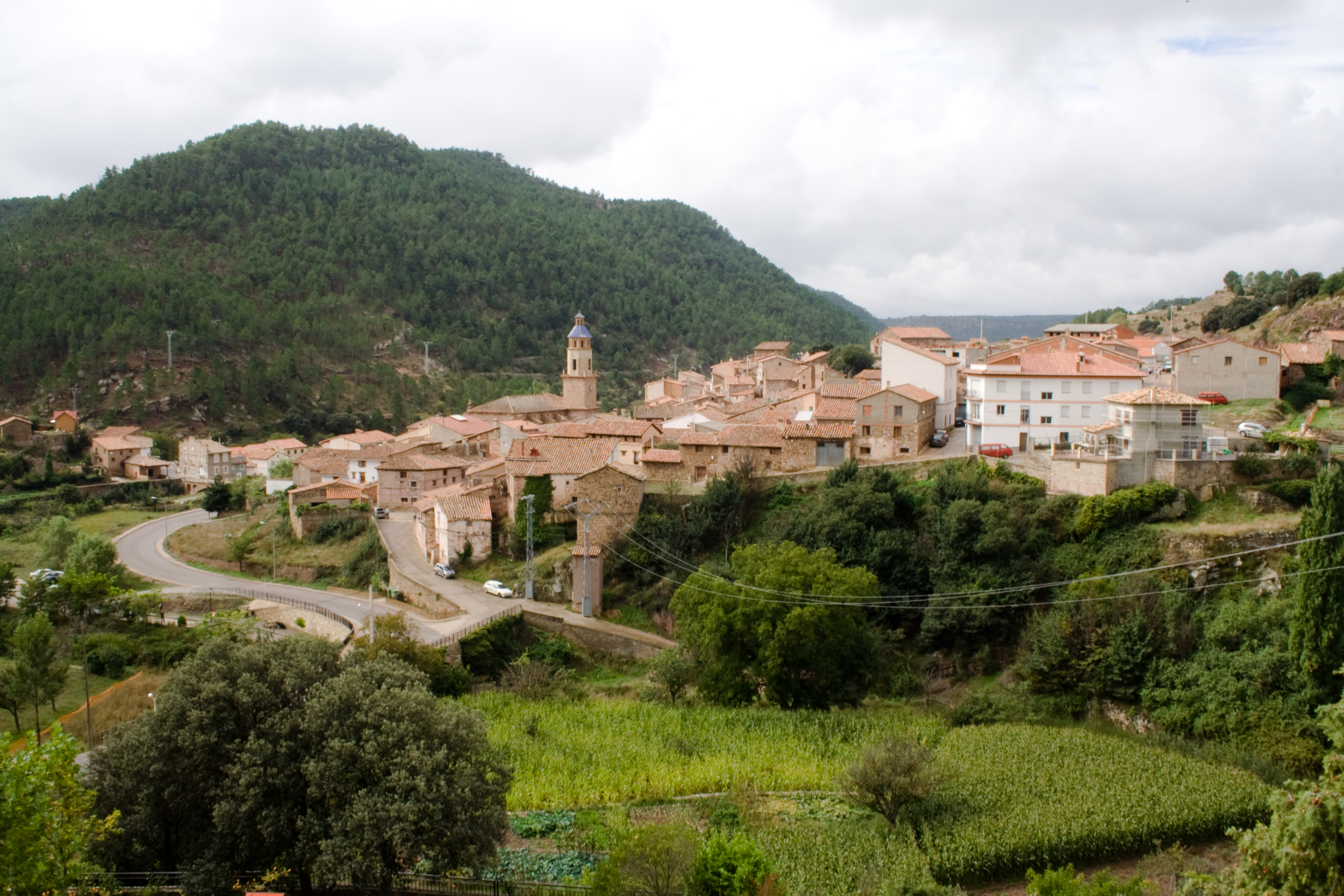

- Flag Coat of arms

- Location of Cabra de Mora in Spain
- Coordinates: 40°19′3″N 0°48′26″W
- Country: Spain
- Autonomous community: Aragon
- Province: Teruel
- Comarca: Gúdar-Javalambre
- Judicial District: Teruel

Government
  - Mayor_{(2011)}: Manuel de la Poza Moreno

Area
  - Total: 34.31 km^{2} (13.25 sq mi)
- Elevation: 1,085 m (3,560 ft)

Population (2025-01-01)
  - Total: 66
  - Density: 1.9/km^{2} (5.0/sq mi)
- Time zone: UTC+01:00 (CET)
  - Summer (DST): UTC+02:00 (CEST)
- Postal code: 44409
- Demonym: Egabrense

Cabra de Mora is a municipality in the province of Teruel, Aragon, Spain. According to the 2004 census (INE), it had a population of 119. By 2018, the population had declined to just 55 residents reflecting a steady decrease since 2007.

== Demography ==
The following graphs show the population progression of Cabra de Mora.

== See also ==
- List of municipalities in Teruel
