= Manzanera =

Manzanera, Spain
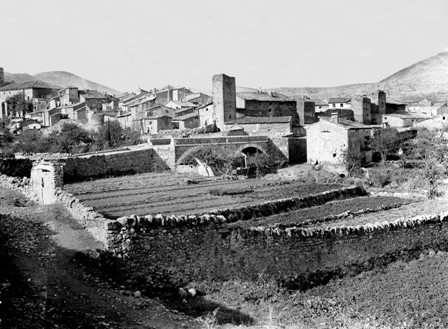

- Coat of arms

- Location within Spain
- Coordinates: 40°3′N 0°50′W
- Country: Spain
- Autonomous community: Aragon
- Province: Teruel
- Comarca: Gúdar-Javalambre

Area
  - Total: 168.66 km^{2} (65.12 sq mi)
- Elevation: 996 m (3,268 ft)

Population (2025-01-01)
  - Total: 530
  - Density: 3.1/km^{2} (8.1/sq mi)
- Time zone: UTC+1 (CET)
  - Summer (DST): UTC+2 (CEST)

Manzanera is a small town and municipality in the province of Teruel, part of the autonomous community of Aragón, Spain. It is in the Gúdar-Javalambre comarca and it has 540 people. It is close to the ski area called Javalambre.

== Geography ==
Manzanera is a settlement located in the South of Aragon, at an altitude of 960 m (3,150 ft) above sea level in the Sierra de Javalambra, where the tallest point of the province is located as well as one of the tallest of the Iberian System, near the Province of Castellón. It enjoys a continental Mediterranean climate with cold winters and mild summers.

The municipality is composed of various settlements besides the main nucleus of Manzanera, these are Los Cerezos, Alcotas, El Paúl, Los Olmos, Las Alhambras, and Paraíso Bajo; as well as some uninhabited neighbourhoods such as Torre de Alcotas, Torre de los Peones, and Paraíso Alto. There are several country houses, called masías, scattered throughout the municipal limits. Manzanera is located about 50 km (31 mi) from Teruel and 110 km (68 mi) from Valencia, the nearest highways are the A-23 and N-234, found 10 km (6.2 mi) from town.

The River Albentosa, a tributary of the River Mijares, flows through Manzanera. The river forms just one kilometre before reaching town after the union of the small rivers called Torrijas (which in turn just received the waters from the River Paraíso) and Los Olmos.

== See also ==
- List of municipalities in Teruel
