= La Estrella (Mosqueruela) =

Abandoned village in Spain

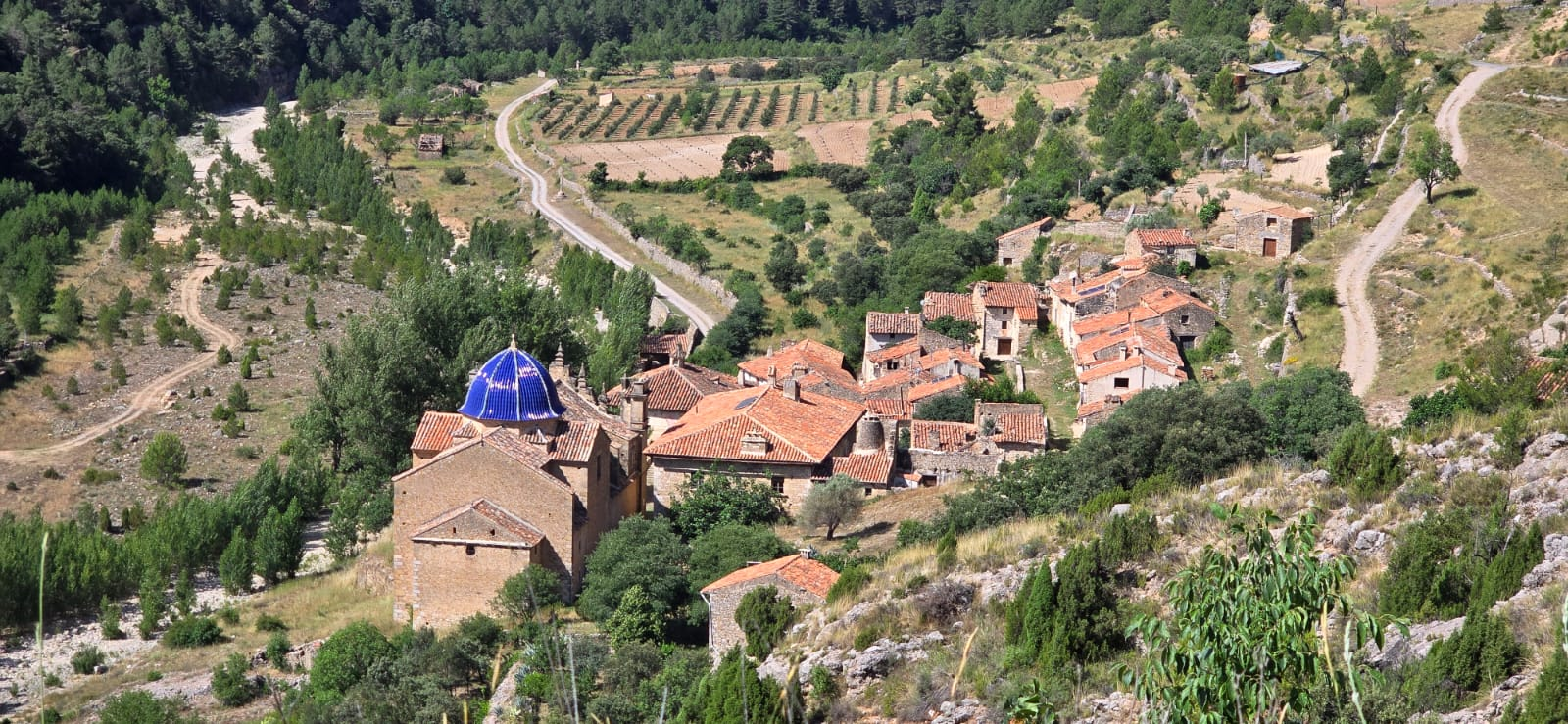
- View of La Estrella

- Location in Spain
- Coordinates: 40.3656°N 0.2942°W
- Country: Spain
- Autonomous community: Aragon
- Province: Teruel
- Comarca: Gúdar-Javalambre
- Municipality: Mosqueruela
- Elevation: 800 m (2,600 ft)

Population (2024)
  - Total: 0

La Estrella is an abandoned village in the municipality of Mosqueruela, in the province of Teruel. Located in Aragon, Spain, it is famous for its last 2 inhabitants, Juan Martín Colomer and Sinforosa Sancho, who moved out in 2023.

== History ==
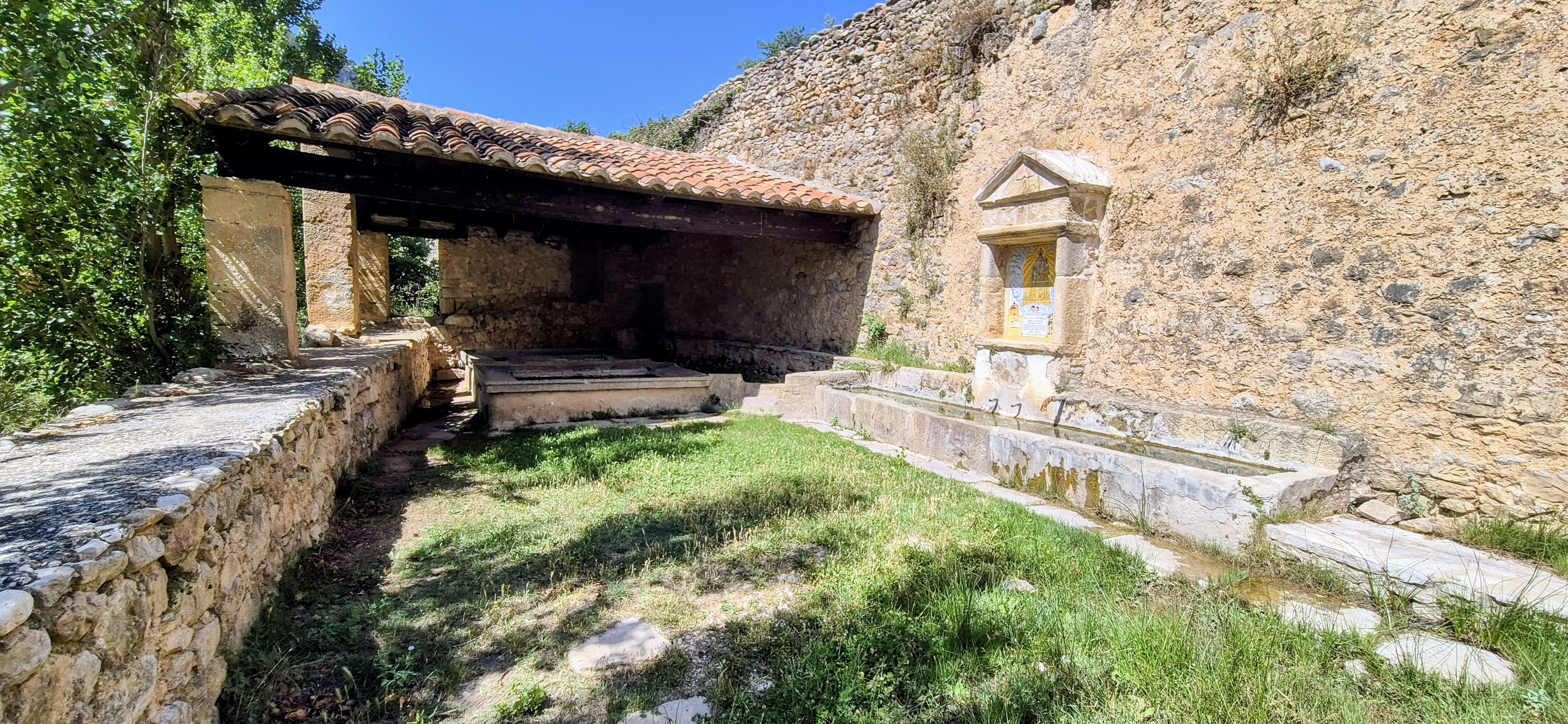
Public laundry houses (safareigs) of La Estrella, located near the river.

La Estrella was known as Villar Las Viñas until the end of the 15th century. The name was changed to La Estrella following the apparition of the Virgin Mary.

Out of the many stories, the oldest one is written by Father Faci. Father Faci indicates a shepherd was tending to his livestock in the area. While among the pine trees, he glimpsed a glow so bright it blinded him. Reminiscent of the burning bush of Horeb he went to examine the light. Upon examination a statue of the Virgin Mary was revealed, holding a baby Christ in her left hand and a bright star in her right. The shepherd then took it back to Mosqueruela to be placed in the parish church to be worshipped. However, each time it was placed in the church, the image of Virgin Mary would return to where it was found. Thus, they decided to place it at the site of the apparition, where a chapel was built to worship it.

The first church "did not exceed two narrow arches". In the 1500s a new chapel was built to house the image of the Virgin Mary of the Star and a sacristy; two chapels dedicated to John the Baptist and the Holy Cross; and a bell tower. However, these buildings were cleared to make way for the construction of the current church. The current church, the Sanctuary of the Virgin of the Star, began construction in 1720 and was overseen by Miguel Garafulla.

In 1883, the town was hit by a flash flood; heavy rain combined with the steep slopes of the valley killed 26 and washed away 17 houses.

In the early 1900s, the town had approximately 200 residents. The village had 2 schools, one for boys and one for girls. The village also had 2 taverns. However, following the Spanish Civil War and the industrialization of Spain in the 1950s and 60s, the village experienced severe rural flight (éxodo rural), eventually leaving the town nearly abandoned by the 1980s.

The final 2 residents, Juan Martín Colomer and Sinforosa Sancho, left the town in early 2023 due to their old age and lack of basic services. Their relocation to Vilafranca left La Estrella depopulated.

== Sanctuary of the Virgin of the Star ==
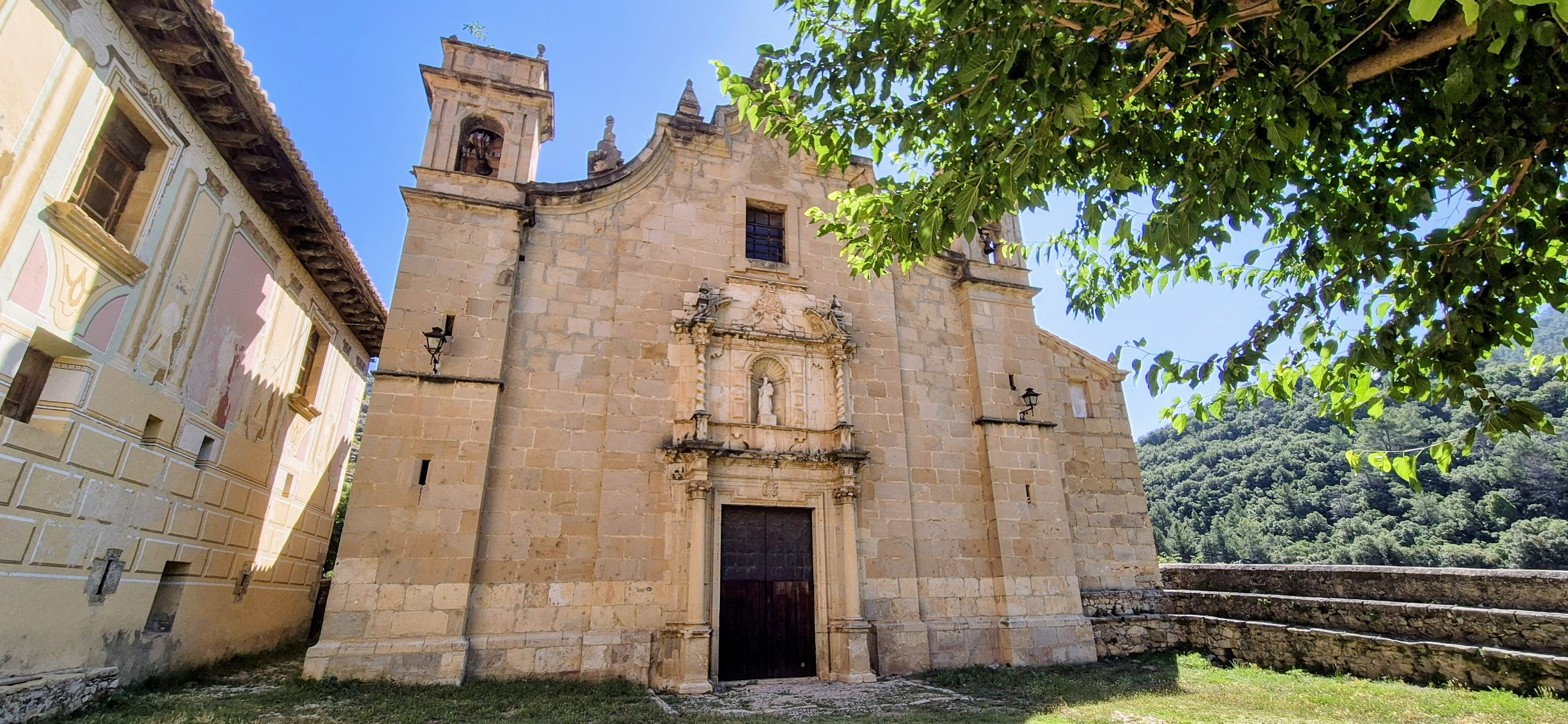
The Sanctuary in La Estrella.

The Sanctuary of the Virgin of the Star began construction in 1720 and was overseen by Miguel Garafulla. The church serves as a good example of 18th-century Valencian architecture. It follows a latin cross floorplan and has 3 naves of varying heights. The central nave features barrel vaults with lunettes. The side naves have sail vaults. At the crossing of the transept, the structure is topped by a "half-orange" dome (media naranja). The dome lacks a drum and lantern which were common elements in Valencian Baroque architecture. The exterior of the dome is decorated with glazed blue tiles.

The exterior façade is characterized by a mixtilinear gable and is flanked by two symmetrical towers that serve as belfries. The sanctuary is located in the village square.

== Culture ==
Despite the lack of permanent residents, La Estrella remains a site of religious significance. An annual pilgrimage (romería) takes place on the last Sunday of May, drawing hundreds of people from Mosqueruela and surrounding towns to the sanctuary.

== Geography ==
The village is 15 kilometers away from Mosqueruela and is situated on the Monleón River.
