= Ribera Alta del Ebro =

- Comarca
- Interactive map of Ribera Alta del Ebro
- Coordinates: 41°47′00″N 1°09′30″E
- Country: Spain
- Autonomous community: Aragon
- Province: Zaragoza
- Capital: Alagón
- Municipalities: List: See text

Area
  - Total: 416 km^{2} (161 sq mi)

Population
  - Total: 26,952
  - Density: 64.8/km^{2} (168/sq mi)
- Time zone: UTC+1 (CET)
  - Summer (DST): UTC+2 (CEST)

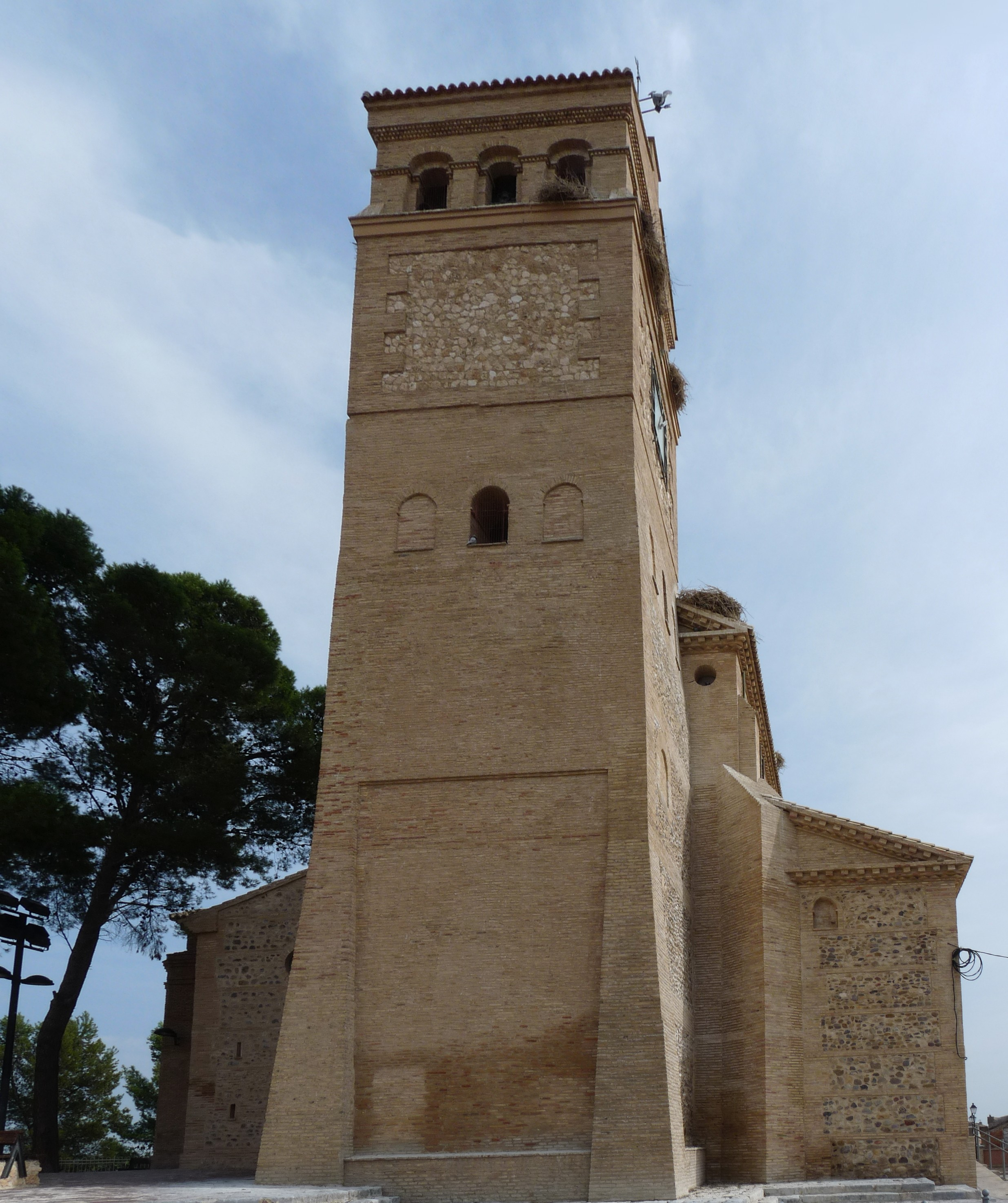
Gallur, St. Pieter's church

Ribera Alta del Ebro is a comarca in Aragon, Spain. It is located in Zaragoza Province.

The capital of Ribera Alta del Ebro is Alagón. This comarca is one of the smallest comarcas in Aragon, but it has a relatively high population.

== Municipalities ==
- Alagón
- Alcalá de Ebro
- Bárboles
- Boquiñeni
- Cabañas de Ebro
- Figueruelas
- Gallur
- Grisén
- La Joyosa
- Luceni
- Pedrola
- Pinseque
- Pleitas
- Pradilla de Ebro
- Remolinos
- Sobradiel
- Torres de Berrellén

== See also ==
- Comarcas of Aragon
