= Fuentes de Rubielos =

- municipality
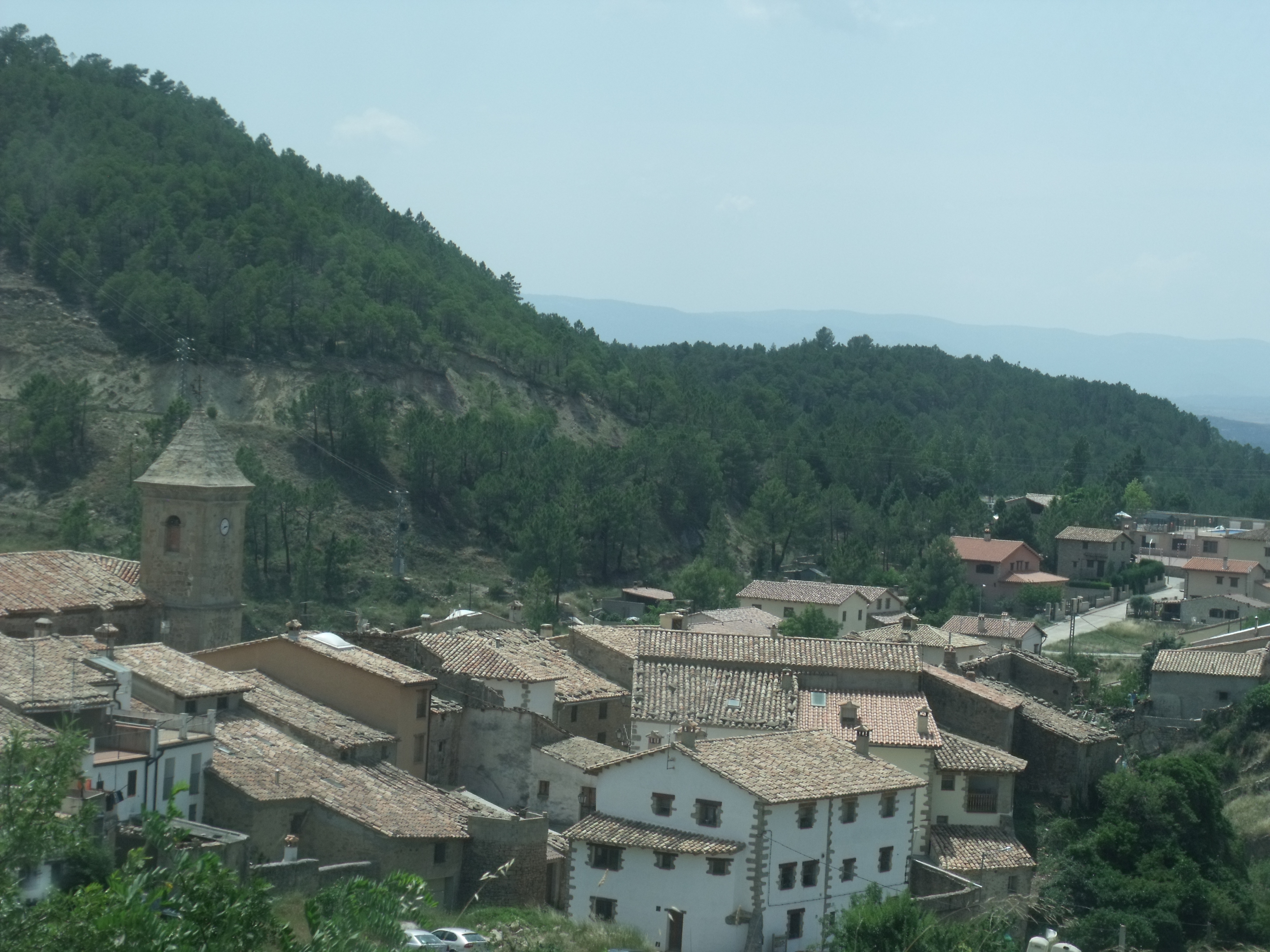

- Location within Spain
- Coordinates: 40°10′N 0°37′W
- Country: Spain
- Autonomous community: Aragon
- Province: Teruel
- Comarca: Gúdar-Javalambre

Area
  - Total: 39.31 km^{2} (15.18 sq mi)
- Elevation: 962 m (3,156 ft)

Population (2025-01-01)
  - Total: 148
  - Density: 3.76/km^{2} (9.75/sq mi)
- Time zone: UTC+1 (CET)
  - Summer (DST): UTC+2 (CEST)

Fuentes de Rubielos is a municipality located in the province of Teruel, Aragon, Spain. According to the 2004 census (INE), the municipality had a population of 119 inhabitants.

== See also ==
- List of municipalities in Teruel
