= Caseron Marques de Camachos =

Mansion in southern Spain

Coordinates: 37°53′16″N 01°20′56″W

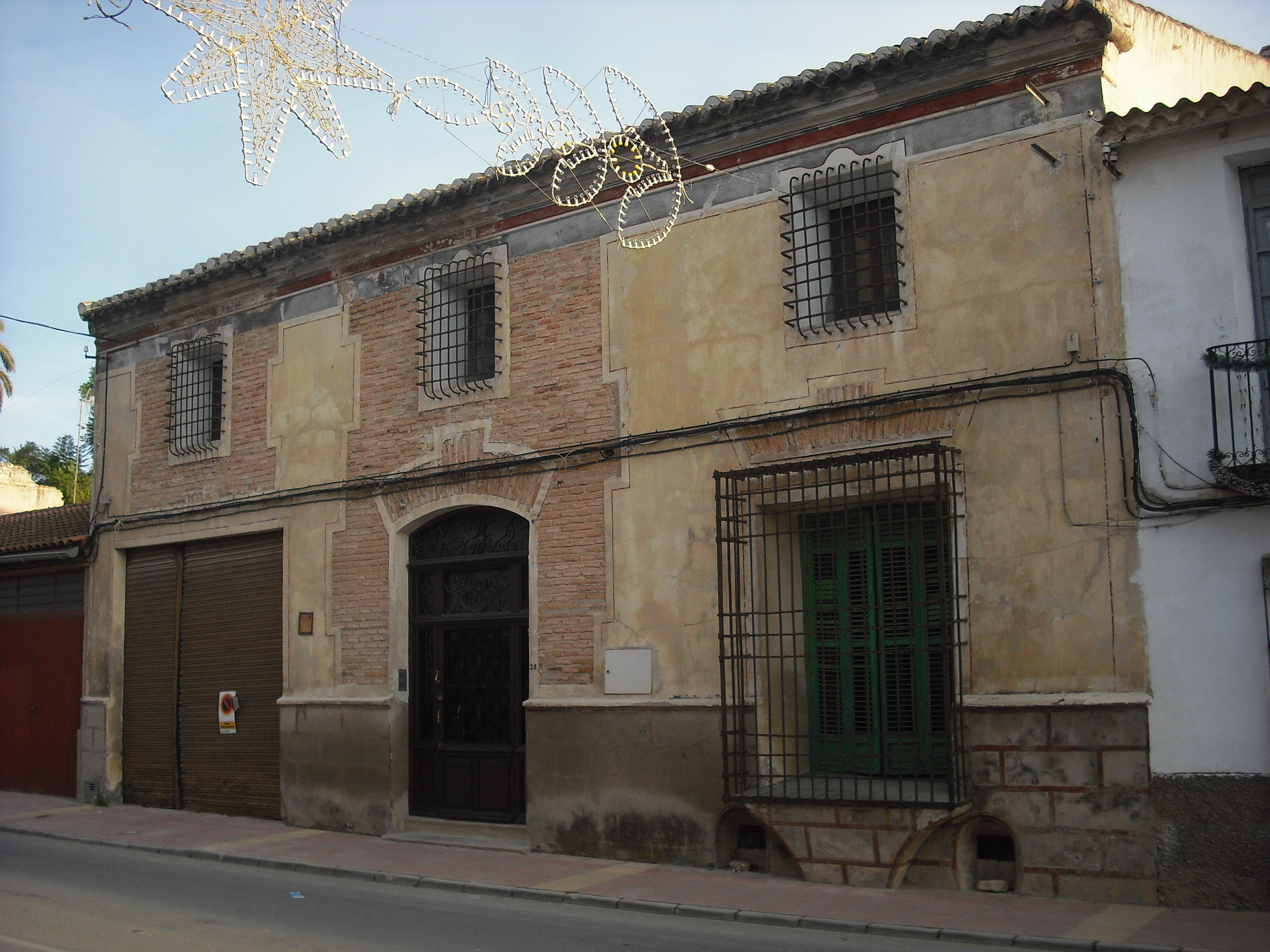
Front of Caseron Marques de Camachos.

The Caseron Marques de Camachos is a mansion located in the village of Librilla, Murcia, southern Spain. Built in the late 16th century, it is a local landmark and major urban architectural currently owned by the descendants of the Marquis de Camacho.

== Description ==
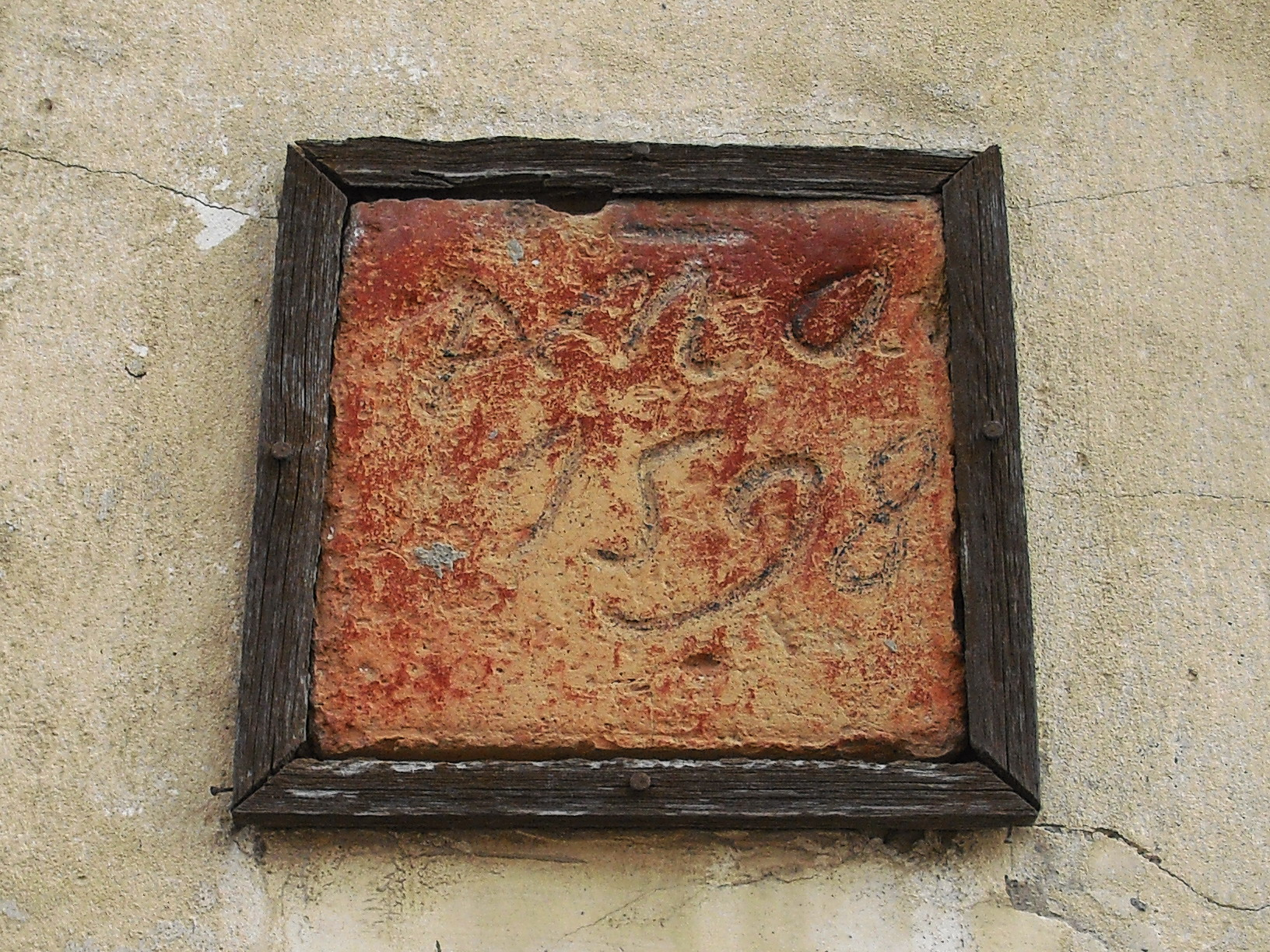
Building year plate.

It is an ancient noble house dating back to 1598, although it has undergone further renovations on its original state. It has a gable roof supported by large wooden beams. In the interior, the large kitchen has a large fireplace, typical 18th century furnishings and some family portraits. It has a large wooden carved entrance and two large windows, a veranda with wrought iron railings from the 18th century.
