= El Castellar =

- municipality
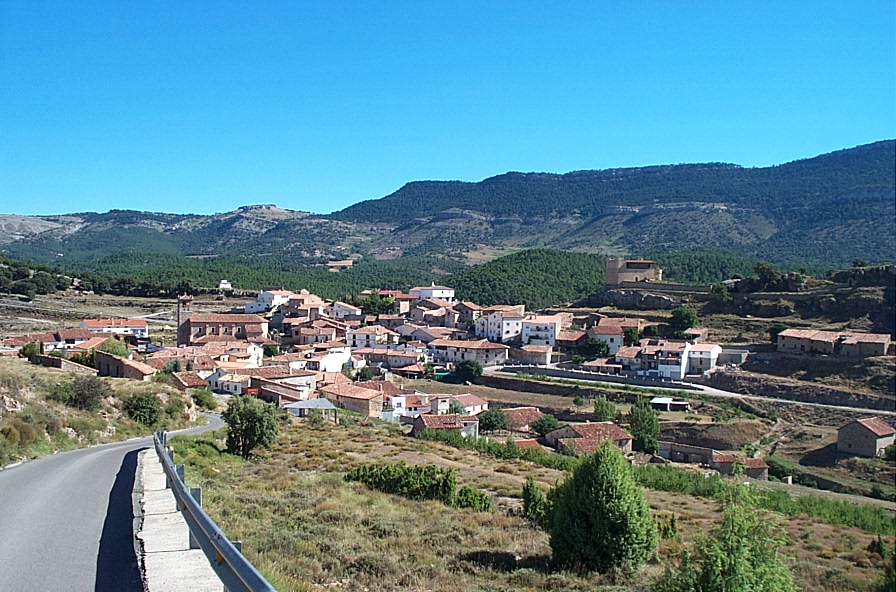

- Flag Coat of arms

- Location within Spain
- Coordinates: 40°22′N 0°49′W
- Country: Spain
- Autonomous community: Aragon
- Province: Teruel
- Comarca: Gúdar-Javalambre

Area
  - Total: 50.33 km^{2} (19.43 sq mi)

Population (2025-01-01)
  - Total: 54
  - Density: 1.1/km^{2} (2.8/sq mi)
- Time zone: UTC+1 (CET)
  - Summer (DST): UTC+2 (CEST)

El Castellar is a municipality located in the province of Teruel, Aragon, Spain. According to the 2004 census (INE), the municipality had a population of 81 inhabitants.

== See also ==
- List of municipalities in Teruel
