= Alagón, Zaragoza =

Alagón
- municipality
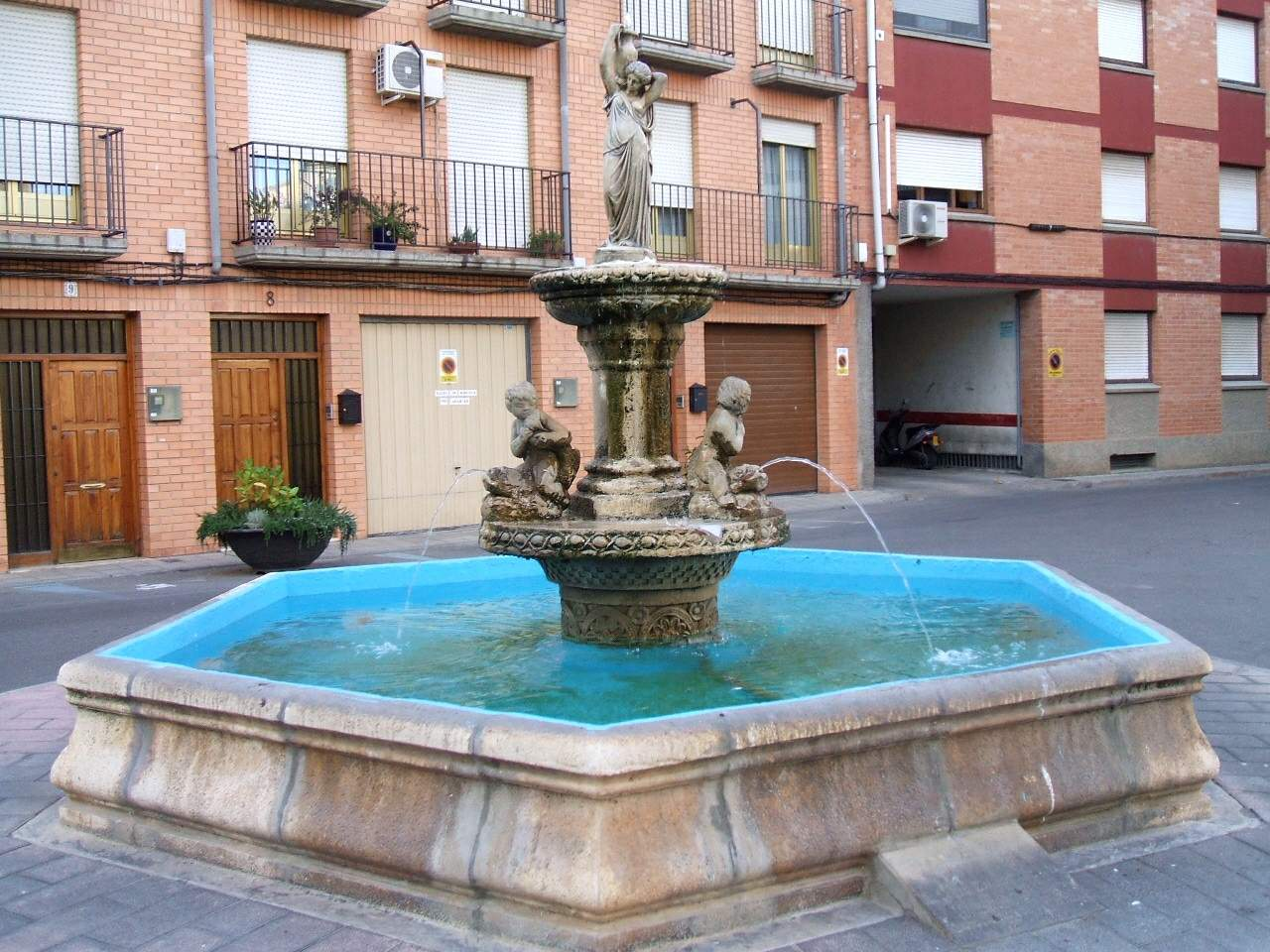

- Flag Coat of arms

- Location within Aragon Location within Spain Location within Europe
- Country: Spain
- Autonomous community: Aragon
- Province: Zaragoza
- Comarca: Ribera Alta del Ebro

Area
  - Total: 24.22 km^{2} (9.35 sq mi)
- Elevation: 235 m (771 ft)

Population (2025-01-01)
  - Total: 7,532
  - Density: 311.0/km^{2} (805.4/sq mi)
- Time zone: UTC+1 (CET)
  - Summer (DST): UTC+2 (CEST)

Alagón is a municipality in the province of Zaragoza, Aragon, Spain. According to the 2009 census (INE), it had a population of 7195.

Historically, a Jewish community living in Alagón during the period of Muslim rule. However, in 1492, the community was decimated following the expulsion of the Jews.

== Notable people ==
- Jesús Angoy (born 22 May 1966) is a Spanish retired association football goalkeeper, who also played as a placekicker in American football.

== See also ==
- List of municipalities in Zaragoza
