= Mora de Rubielos =

- Municipality
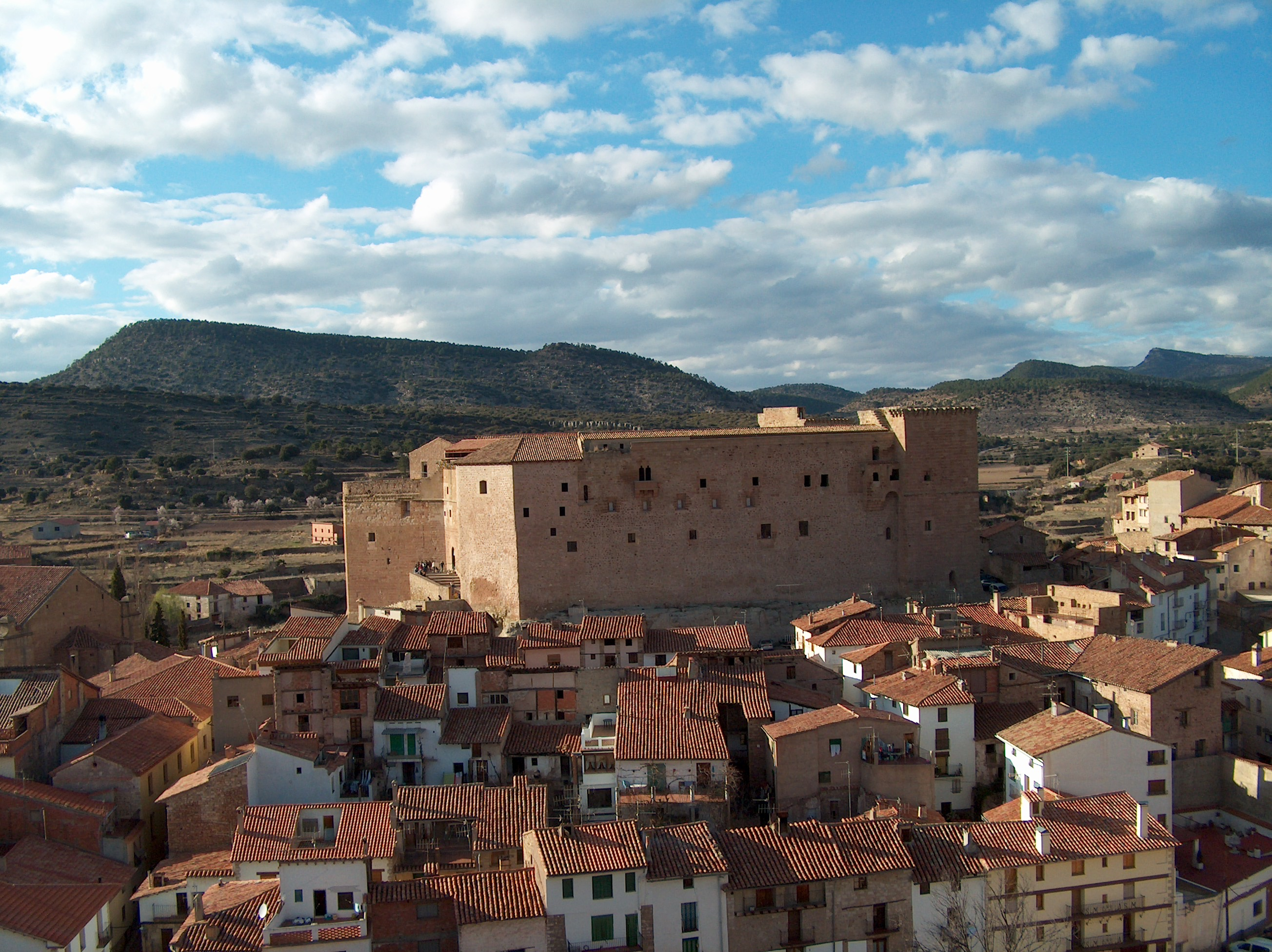

- Coat of arms

- Location within Spain Location within Aragon
- Coordinates: 40°15′N 0°45′W
- Country: Spain
- Autonomous community: Aragon
- Province: Teruel
- Comarca: Gúdar-Javalambre

Area
  - Total: 166.2 km^{2} (64.2 sq mi)
- Elevation: 1,035 m (3,396 ft)

Population (2025-01-01)
  - Total: 1,752
  - Density: 10.54/km^{2} (27.30/sq mi)
- Time zone: UTC+1 (CET)
  - Summer (DST): UTC+2 (CEST)

Mora de Rubielos is a municipality located in the mountainous area of the Iberian System, province of Teruel, Aragon, Spain.

According to the 2009 census (INE), the municipality has a population of 1,756 inhabitants. Mora de Rubielos has a beautiful 14th-century castle. Mora de Rubielos is the capital of the Comarca of Gúdar-Javalambre.

== Location and climate ==
The town of Mora de Rubielos is in the region of Alto Mijares, by the Fuen Lozana river, at the foot of the Sierra de Gúdar. It includes three population types: the farmhouses, whose population is mainly immigrant is dying out; the small towns of Santa Lucía, Troya, The Aliagarico, El Plano, La Cuba and The Masecicos, which retain their population; and the town itself.

The town lies at an altitude of 1,035 m (3,396 ft); it has a mid-mountain climate, dry with cold winters and mild summers. Its average annual temperature is 11.1 °C (52.0 °F) and its average rainfall is 550 mm (22 in).

== History ==
During the Middle Ages, the territory of Mora was reconquered by the troops of Alfonso II, being until the take of Rubielos in 1204 the most advanced position of the Christian forces against Muslims in the Kingdom of Valencia. It subsequently underwent a series of donations and sales; Pedro Ladrón in 1198 received the town and castle from the hands of Pedro II, but his successor James I included it in the barony of Jérica, donating it to his natural son Don Jaime.

Mora was occupied by the Spanish troops in the War of the Two Peters but returned to Aragonese hands in 1364, receiving the privilege of Pedro IV for which it undertook not to separate it from the crown. Such privilege was not taken into account, being the town and castle sold to the Viscount of Cardona, Don Hugo, who, in turn, sold to Don Blasco Fernández de Heredia in 1367. Finally, the lineage of the Fernández de Heredia remained as owner of this population, taking charge of it in 1388 Gil Ruiz de Lihori, who changed his name to Juan Fernández de Heredia. In this locality there was a customs office for the collection of taxes on trade with Valencia.

In the late fifteenth century Mora acquired the title of Marquesado and after the War of Succession, as a supporter of Philip V of Bourbon, received the title of "Faithful" and the fleur de lis on its shield.

Pascual Madoz, in its geographic-statistical-historical Dictionary of Spain, 1845, describes the town divided into two parts, called a new Villa and the other Villa Vieja, which are separated by a small creek or ravine; It consists of about 500 houses of regular construction, being remarkable the city council. As for the economy, it highlights the production of wheat, corn, beans, potatoes, onions and vegetables as well as the existence of sheep. The book also mentions the manufacture of brown cloth and how in the past sackcloth for religious communities was manufactured there, but the extinction of these activitiesd had killed the industry, impoverishing the town.

Although the War of Independence and the Carlist Wars left their mark on Mora, the greatest role of the town took place during the Spanish Civil War. In a phase of the Battle of Teruel (1937 - 1938), after the fall of Andorra and Alcañiz, Mora de Rubielos was the capital of the republican-held area. Previously, an episode of insubordination in this village had resulted in the shooting of More than 50 men of the 84th Mixed Brigade on January 20, 1938. By May 1938, the territory in Republican rule in the province was defended by a set of staggered lines of a hundred kilometers long known as the Grande Arche de Mora Rubielos. As the war progressed, Mora fell into a difficult situation by the advance of the Franco-led army, remaining in the so-called Bolsa de Mora de Rubielos, until finally, on July 16, the troops of General Varela broke the front near the town. The information of the national side said on the front of Teruel our troops have conducted today ... a profound advance in a front of more than thirty-five kilometers, having taken and passed, in addition to many positions of great importance, the town of Mora de Rubielos. For a few days the headquarters of General Franco were in the town.

== See also ==
- Sierra de Gúdar
- List of municipalities in Teruel
