= Valdelinares =

- municipality
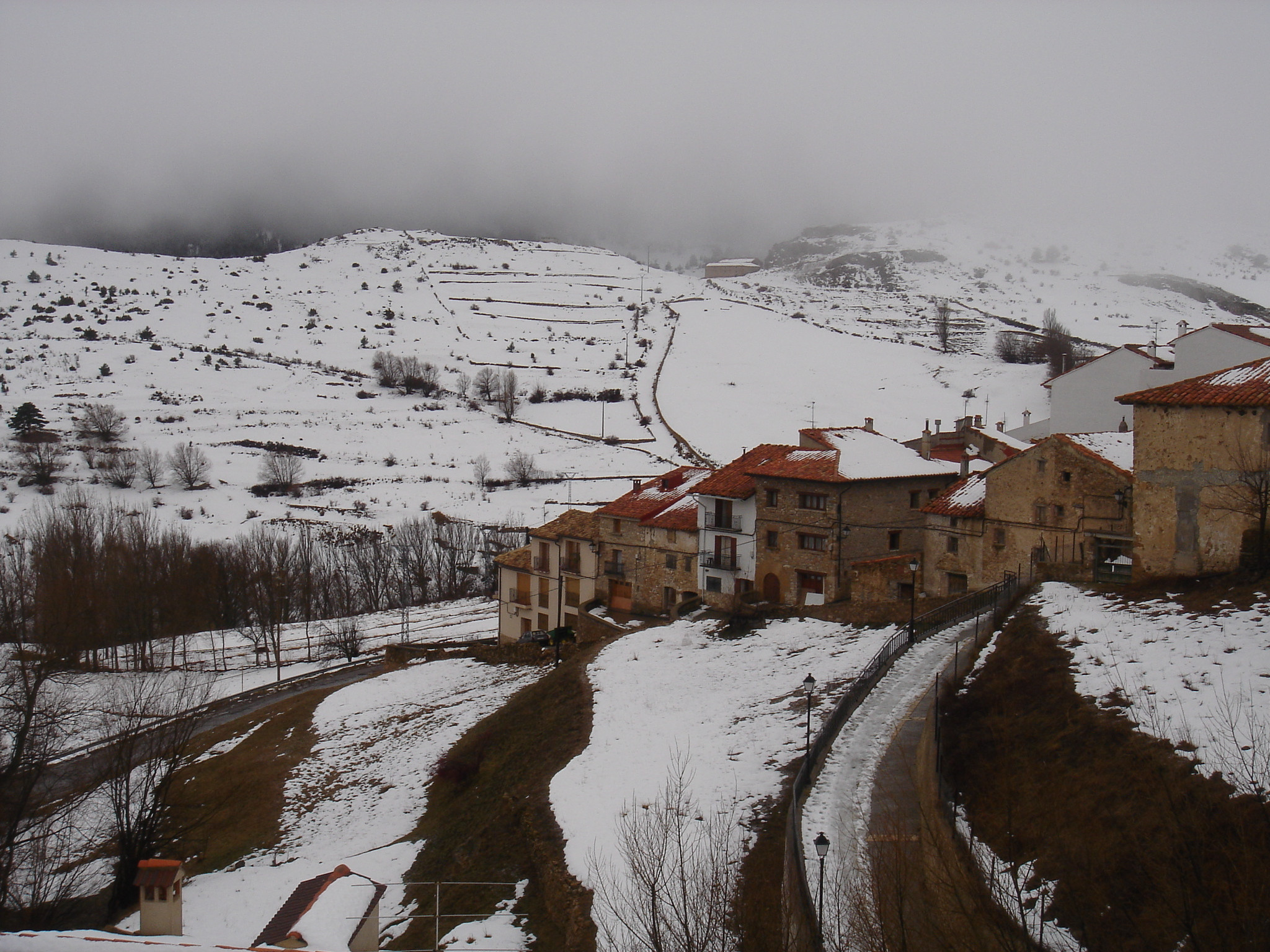
- Valdelinares

- Location within Spain
- Coordinates: 40°24′N 0°36′W
- Country: Spain
- Autonomous community: Aragon
- Province: Teruel
- Municipality: Valdelinares

Area
  - Total: 55.09 km^{2} (21.27 sq mi)
- Elevation: 1,690 m (5,540 ft)

Population (2025-01-01)
  - Total: 82
  - Density: 1.5/km^{2} (3.9/sq mi)
- Time zone: UTC+1 (CET)
  - Summer (DST): UTC+2 (CEST)

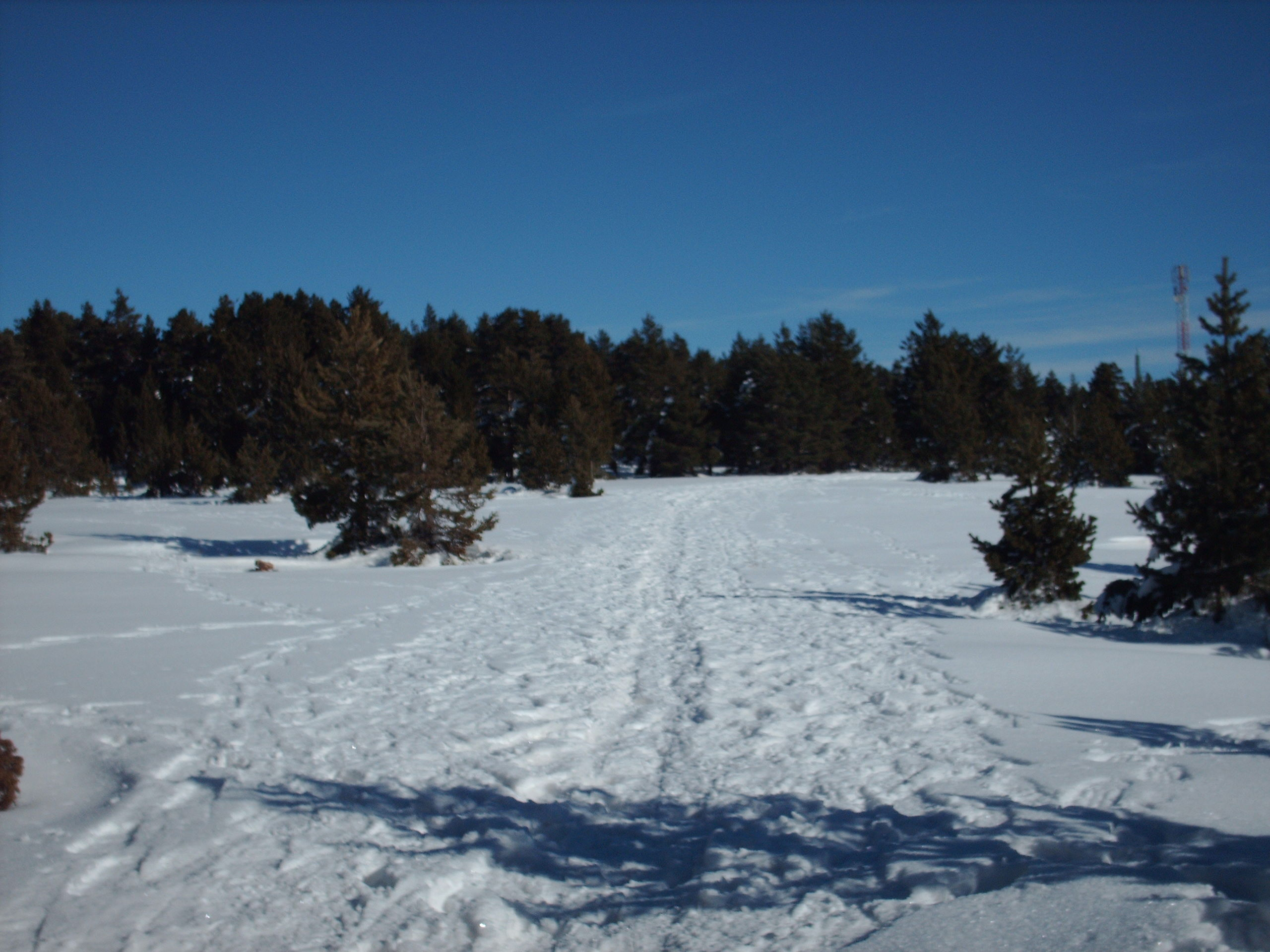
Black mountain pine forest, the most widespread trees in the area

Valdelinares is a municipality and ski resort located in the Sierra de Gúdar range of the Sistema Ibérico, in the province of Teruel, Aragon, Spain. According to the 2004 census (INE), the municipality had a population of 141 inhabitants.

The elevation of the village is 1,690 metres (5,540 ft) above sea level, making this town the highest in Peninsular Spain among those which are the seat of a municipality.

Valdelinares has a mostly dry, high mountain climate with much snow in winter. Winter sports can be practised in the nearby resort of Aramón, 7 kilometres (4 mi) away. In the summer months the town is popular with hikers and mountaineers.

== See also ==
- Sierra de Gúdar
- List of municipalities in Teruel
