= Gúdar =

- municipality
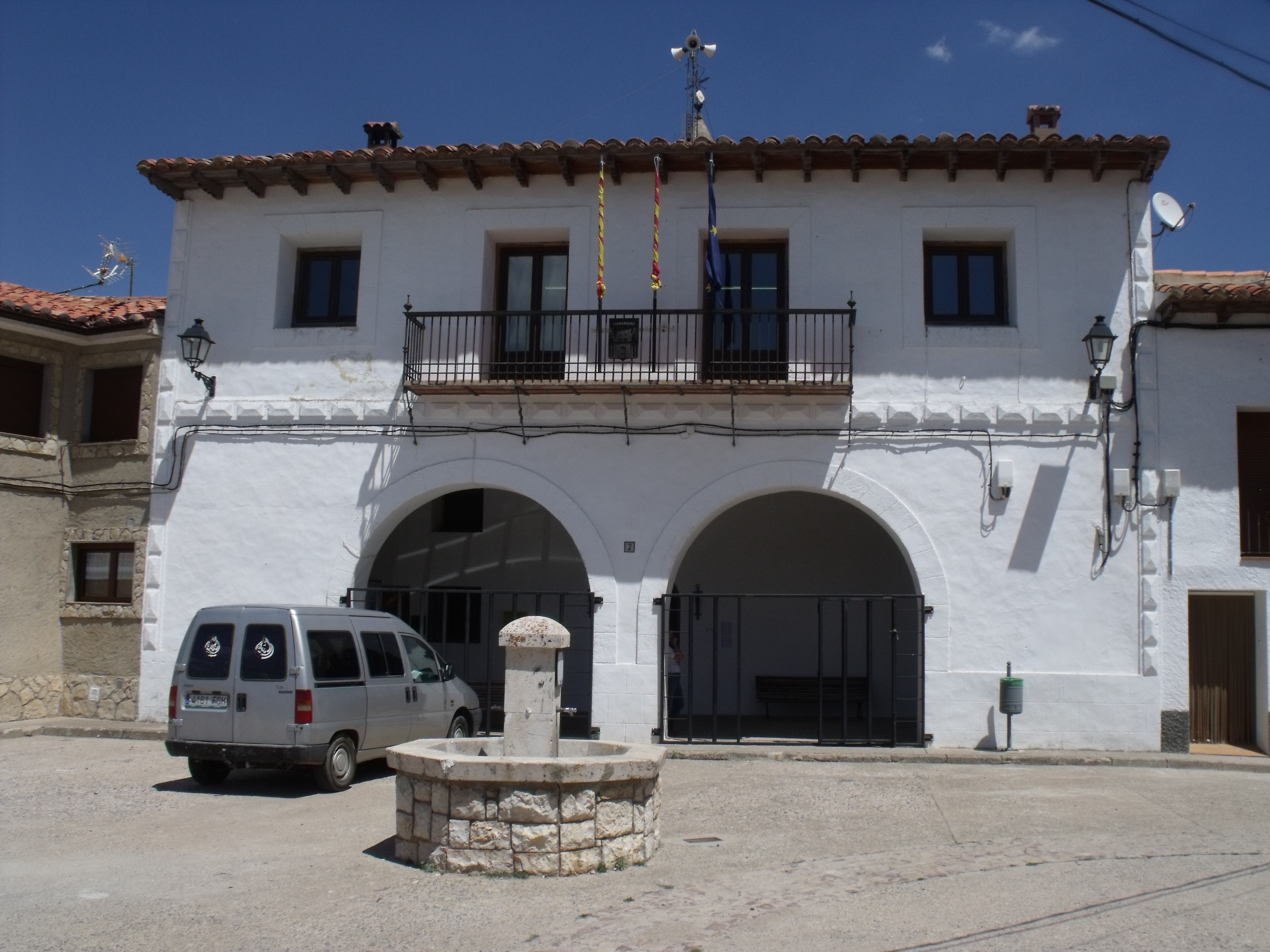

- Coat of arms

- Location within Spain
- Coordinates: 40°27′N 0°43′W
- Country: Spain
- Autonomous community: Aragon
- Province: Teruel

Area
  - Total: 60.77 km^{2} (23.46 sq mi)
- Elevation: 1,581 m (5,187 ft)

Population (2025-01-01)
  - Total: 73
  - Density: 1.2/km^{2} (3.1/sq mi)
- Time zone: UTC+1 (CET)
  - Summer (DST): UTC+2 (CEST)

Gúdar is a municipality located in the province of Teruel, Aragon, Spain. It has a population of 73 (register office, 2025).

This town gives its name to the Sierra de Gúdar, one of the main ranges of the Iberian System.

== See also ==
- List of municipalities in Teruel
