= Valbona, Spain =

Valbona
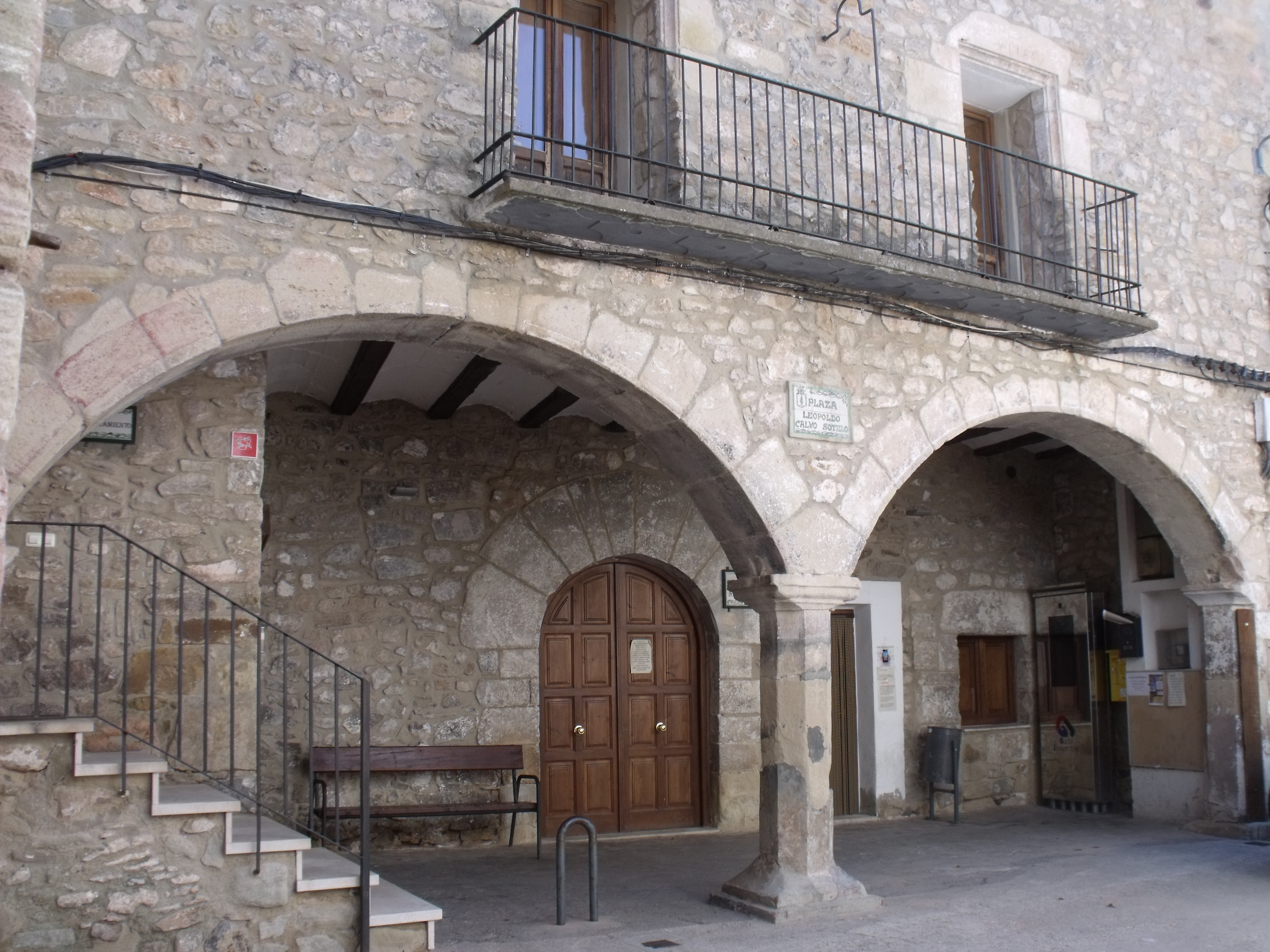

- Coat of arms

- Location within Spain
- Coordinates: 40°14′N 0°48′W
- Country: Spain
- Autonomous community: Aragon
- Province: Teruel
- Municipality: Valbona

Area
  - Total: 40.81 km^{2} (15.76 sq mi)
- Elevation: 949 m (3,114 ft)

Population (2025-01-01)
  - Total: 187
  - Density: 4.58/km^{2} (11.9/sq mi)
- Time zone: UTC+1 (CET)
  - Summer (DST): UTC+2 (CEST)

Valbona is a municipality located in the province of Teruel, Aragon, Spain. According to the 2004 census (INE), the municipality had a population of 212 inhabitants.

== See also ==
- List of municipalities in Teruel
