= Rubielos de Mora =

- municipality
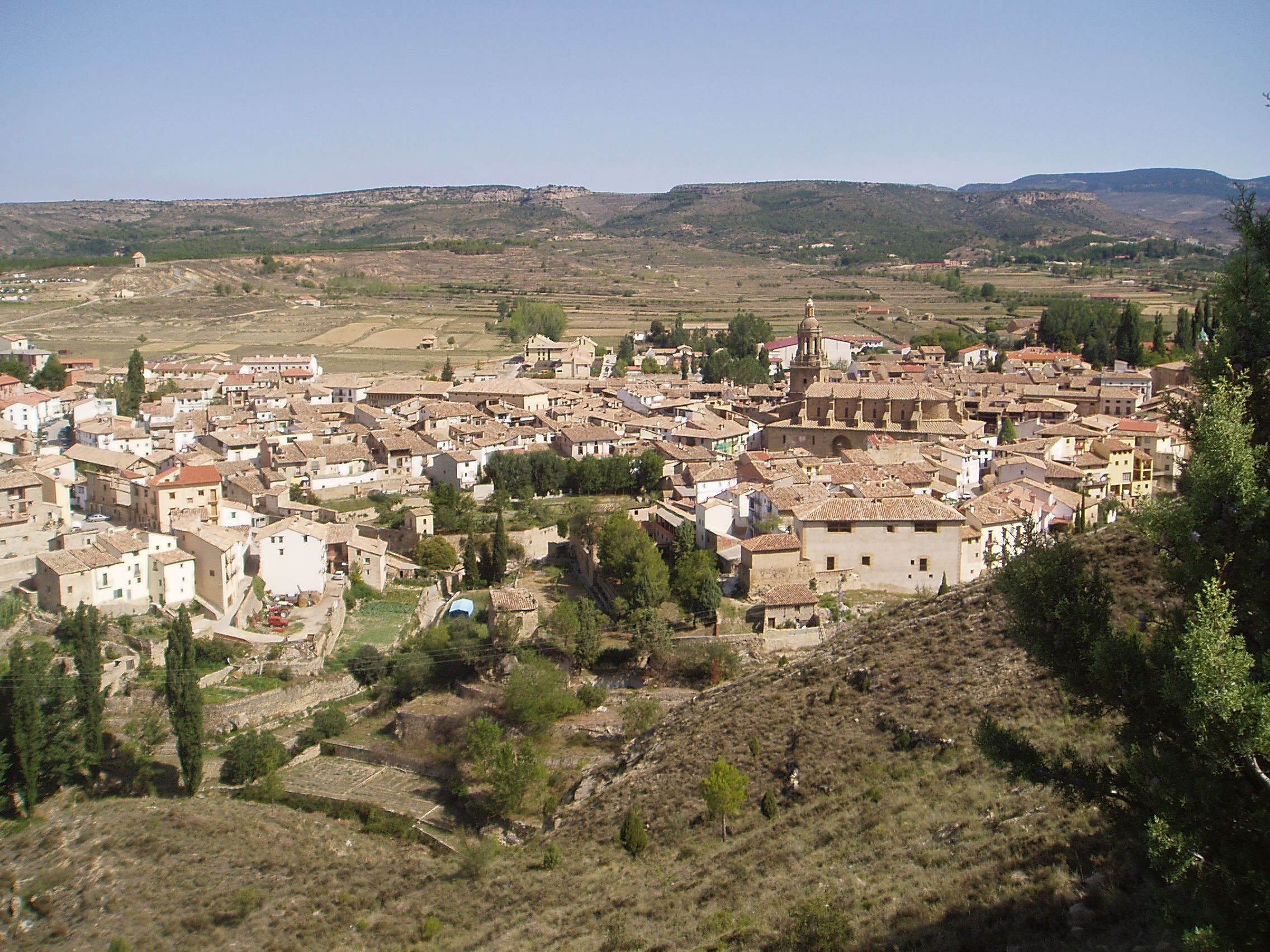

- Coat of arms

- Location within Spain Location within Aragon
- Coordinates: 40°11′N 0°39′W
- Country: Spain
- Autonomous community: Aragon
- Province: Teruel
- Comarca: Gúdar-Javalambre

Area
  - Total: 63.72 km^{2} (24.60 sq mi)
- Elevation: 929 m (3,048 ft)

Population (2025-01-01)
  - Total: 600
  - Density: 9.4/km^{2} (24/sq mi)
- Time zone: UTC+1 (CET)
  - Summer (DST): UTC+2 (CEST)

Rubielos de Mora is a municipality located in the province of Teruel, Aragon, Spain. According to the 2004 census (INE), the municipality had a population of 652 inhabitants.

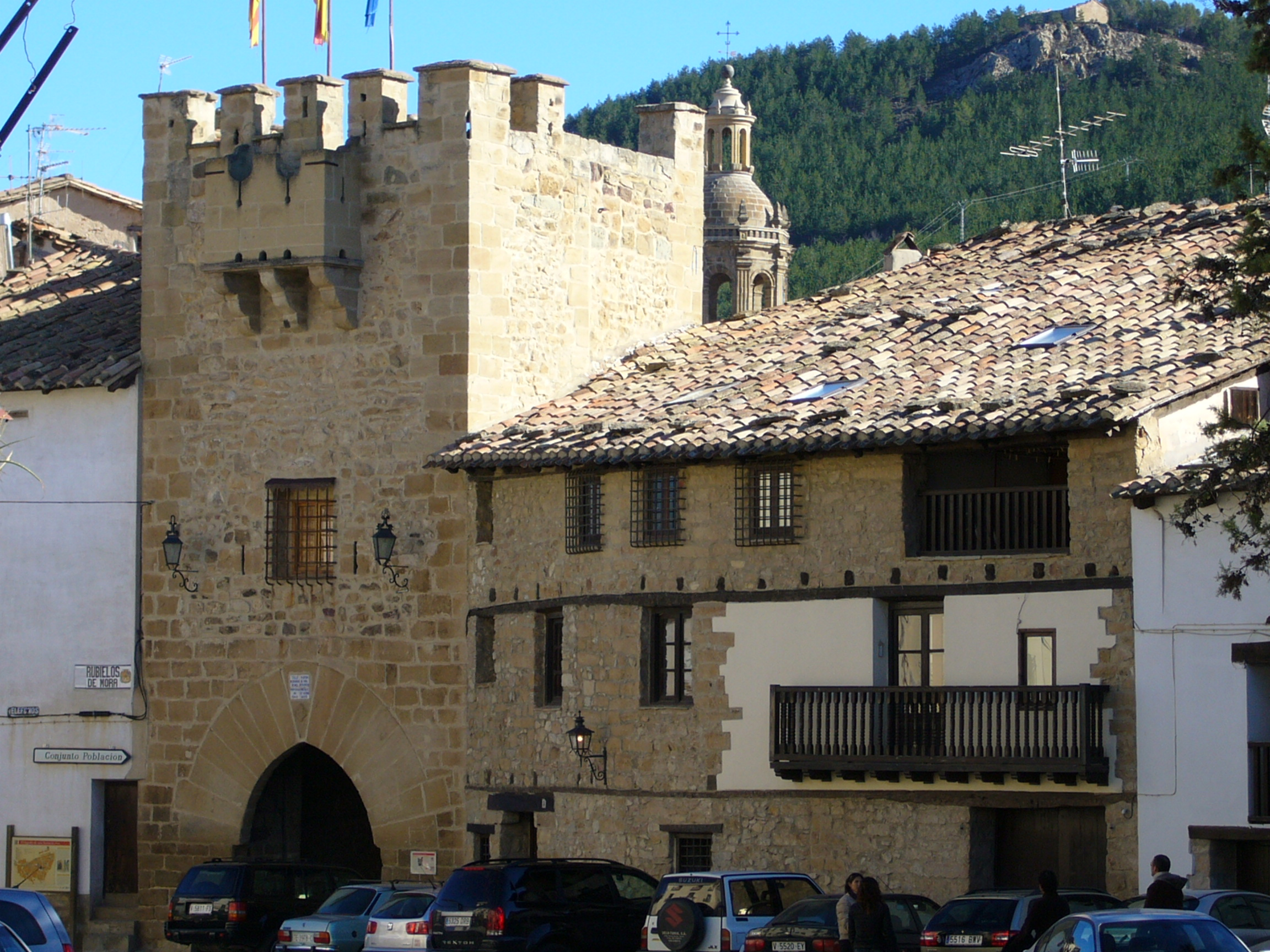
Rubielos de Mora

== See also ==
- List of municipalities in Teruel
