= Mosqueruela =

- municipality
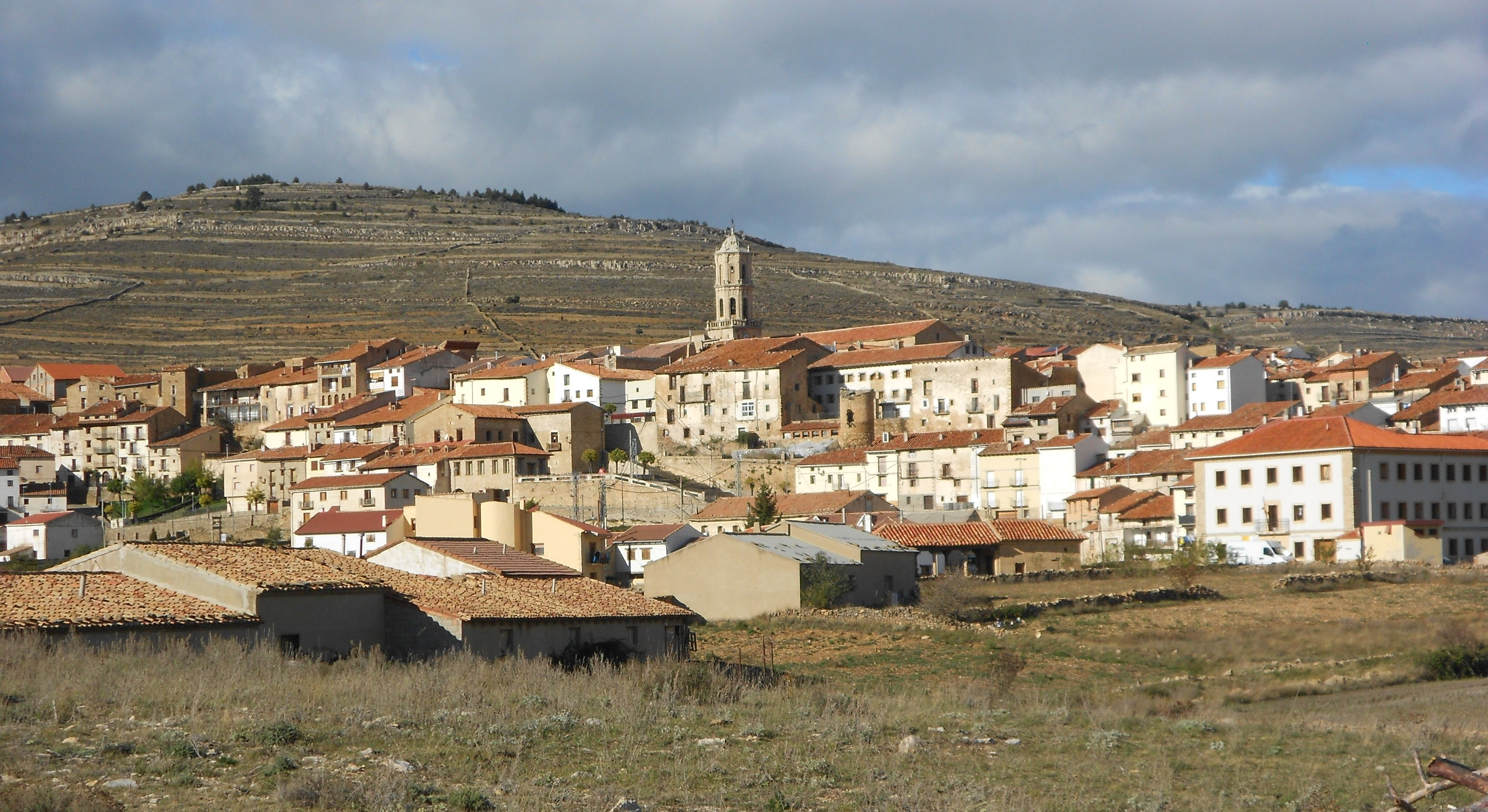

- Coat of arms

- Location within Spain
- Coordinates: 40°21′41″N 0°26′55″W
- Country: Spain
- Autonomous community: Aragon
- Province: Teruel
- Municipality: Mosqueruela

Area
  - Total: 265 km^{2} (102 sq mi)
- Elevation: 1,471 m (4,826 ft)

Population (2025-01-01)
  - Total: 563
  - Density: 2.12/km^{2} (5.50/sq mi)
- Time zone: UTC+1 (CET)
  - Summer (DST): UTC+2 (CEST)

Mosqueruela is a municipality located in the province of Teruel, Aragon, Spain. According to the 2004 census (INE), the municipality has a population of 726 inhabitants.

== Localities ==
The municipality of Mosqueruela includes the abandoned hamlet of La Estrella, located 15 km from the town center. The settlement is noted for its 18th-century Baroque sanctuary and was home to its last two permanent residents until early 2023.

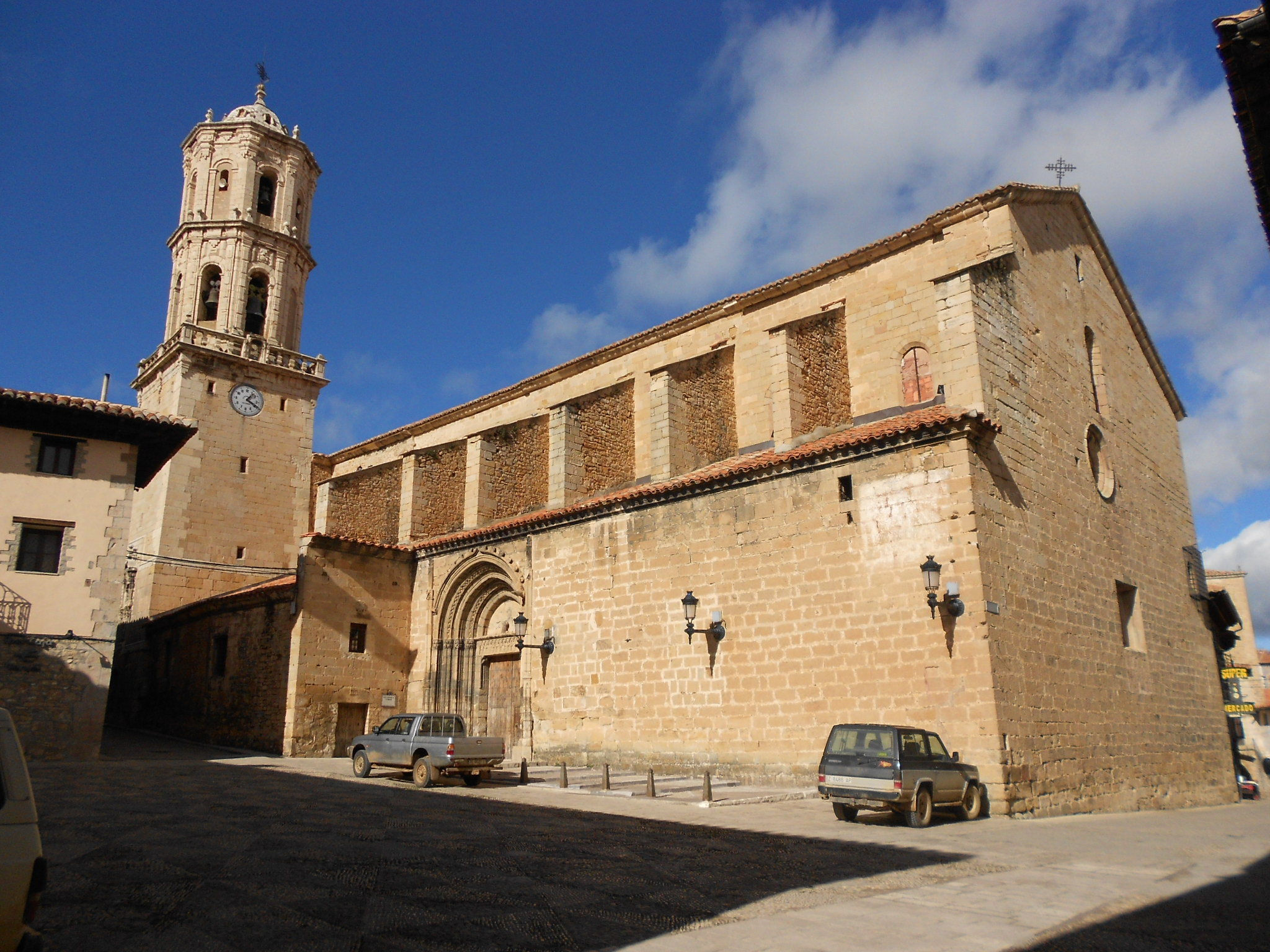

== See also ==
- List of municipalities in Teruel
