= Linares de Mora =

- municipality
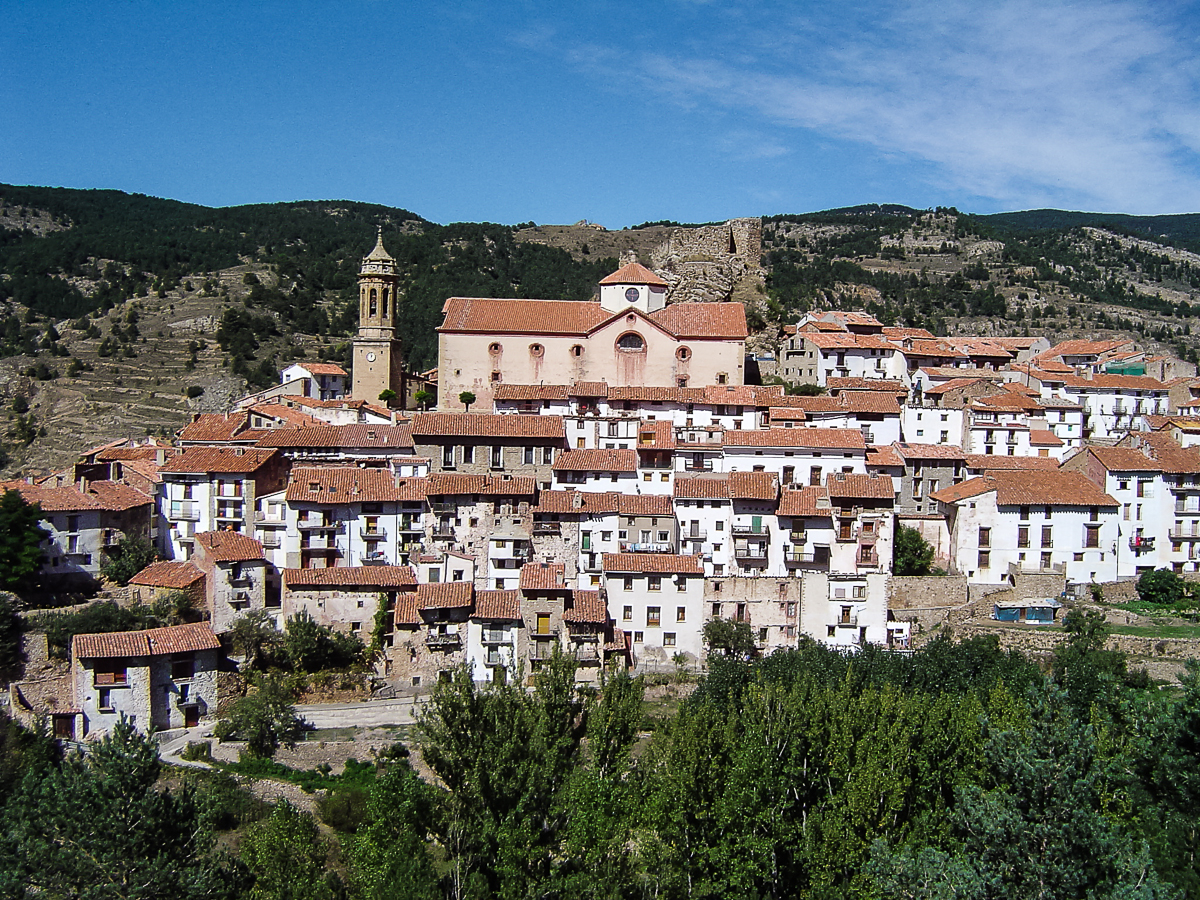

- Coat of arms

- Location within Spain
- Coordinates: 40°19′N 0°34′W
- Country: Spain
- Autonomous community: Aragon
- Province: Teruel

Area
  - Total: 116.28 km^{2} (44.90 sq mi)
- Elevation: 1,311 m (4,301 ft)

Population (2025-01-01)
  - Total: 242
  - Density: 2.08/km^{2} (5.39/sq mi)
- Time zone: UTC+1 (CET)
  - Summer (DST): UTC+2 (CEST)

Linares de Mora is a municipality located in the province of Teruel, Aragon, Spain. According to the 2004 census (INE), the municipality had a population of 329 inhabitants.

== See also ==
- List of municipalities in Teruel
