= Comarcas of Aragon =

List of administrative subdivisions

Here is a list of the administrative comarcas (administrative subdivisions) in the autonomous community of Aragon in Spain. They were officially delimited in 1999, with substantial changes over a previously proposed division.

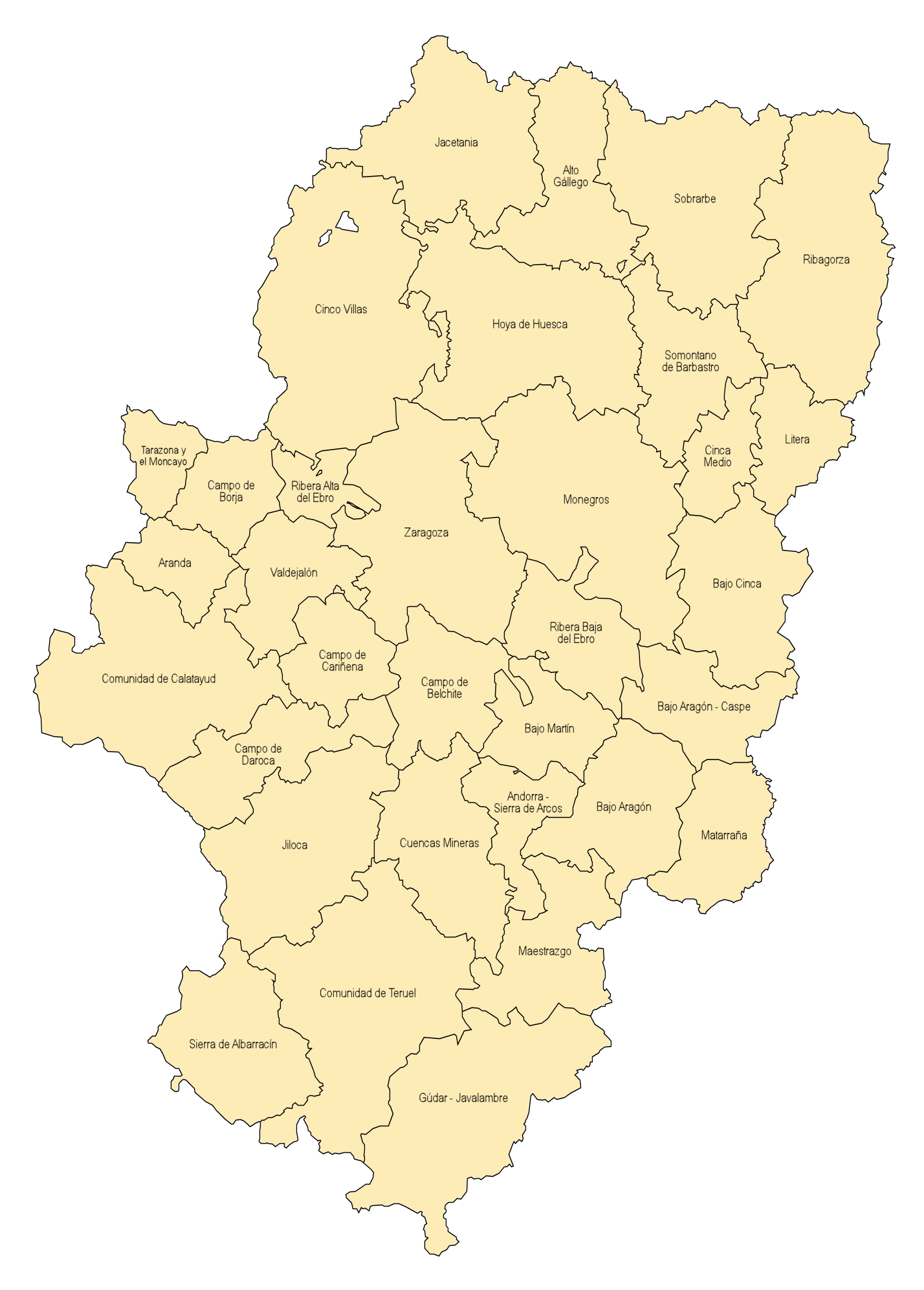
Comarcas of Aragon

No.	Name	Capital	Province
1	Jacetania	Jaca	Huesca, Zaragoza
2	Alto Gállego	Sabiñánigo	Huesca
3	Sobrarbe	Boltaña	Huesca
4	Ribagorza/Ribagorça	Graus-Benabarre	Huesca
5	Cinco Villas/Zinco Billas	Ejea de los Caballeros	Zaragoza
6	Hoya de Huesca/Plana de Uesca	Huesca	Huesca, Zaragoza
7	Somontano de Barbastro	Barbastro	Huesca
8	Cinca Medio	Monzón	Huesca
9	La Litera/La Llitera	Tamarite de Litera-Binéfar	Huesca
10	Bajo Cinca/Baix Cinca	Fraga	Huesca, Zaragoza
11	Monegros	Sariñena	Huesca, Zaragoza
12	Tarazona y el Moncayo	Tarazona	Zaragoza
13	Campo de Borja	Borja	Zaragoza
14	Aranda	Illueca	Zaragoza
15	Ribera Alta del Ebro	Alagón	Zaragoza
16	Valdejalón	La Almunia de Doña Godina	Zaragoza
17	Zaragoza	Utebo	Zaragoza
18	Ribera Baja del Ebro	Quinto	Zaragoza
19	Bajo Aragón-Caspe/Baix Aragó-Casp	Caspe	Zaragoza
20	Comunidad de Calatayud	Calatayud	Zaragoza
21	Campo de Cariñena	Cariñena	Zaragoza
22	Campo de Belchite	Belchite	Zaragoza
23	Bajo Martín	Híjar	Teruel
24	Campo de Daroca	Daroca	Zaragoza
25	Jiloca	Calamocha	Teruel
26	Cuencas Mineras	Utrillas	Teruel
27	Andorra-Sierra de Arcos	Andorra	Teruel
28	Bajo Aragón	Alcañiz	Teruel
29	Comunidad de Teruel	Teruel	Teruel
30	Maestrazgo, Aragon	Cantavieja	Teruel
31	Sierra de Albarracín	Albarracín	Teruel
32	Gúdar-Javalambre	Mora de Rubielos	Teruel
33	Matarraña/Matarranya	Valderrobres-Calaceite	Teruel

== See also ==
- Comarcal council
- Comarcas of Spain

See also lists of municipalities in Aragon by province:

- List of municipalities in Huesca
- List of municipalities in Teruel
- List of municipalities in Zaragoza
