= Castejón =

Castejón may refer to:

- Castejón, Navarre, a municipality in Navarre, Spain
- Castejón, Cuenca, a municipality in the province of Cuenca, Castile-La Mancha, Spain
- Castejón de Alarba, a municipality in the province of Zaragoza, Aragón, Spain
- Castejón de las Armas, a municipality in the province of Zaragoza, Aragón, Spain
- Castejón de Henares, a municipality in the province of Guadalajara, Castile-La Mancha, Spain
- Castejón de Monegros, a municipality in the province of Huesca, Aragón, Spain
- Castejón del Puente, a municipality in the province of Huesca, Aragón, Spain
- Castejón de Sos, a municipality in the province of Huesca, Aragón, Spain
- Castejón de Tornos, a municipality in the province of Teruel, Aragón, Spain
- Castejón de Valdejasa, a municipality in the province of Zaragoza, Aragón, Spain
- Castejón Mountains, in Aragon, Spain
- Sierra de Castejón, in La Rioja, Spain
