= Cinco Villas, Aragon =

Cinco Villas (Spanish) Zinco Billas (Aragonese)
- Comarca
- Coordinates: 42°15′N 01°10′W
- Country: Spain
- Autonomous community: Aragon
- Province: Zaragoza
- Capital: Ejea de los Caballeros
- Municipalities: List: See text

Area
  - Total: 3,062.5 km^{2} (1,182.4 sq mi)

Population
  - Total: 33,584
  - Density: 10.966/km^{2} (28.402/sq mi)
- Time zone: UTC+1 (CET)
  - Summer (DST): UTC+2 (CEST)
- Largest municipality: Ejea de los Caballeros

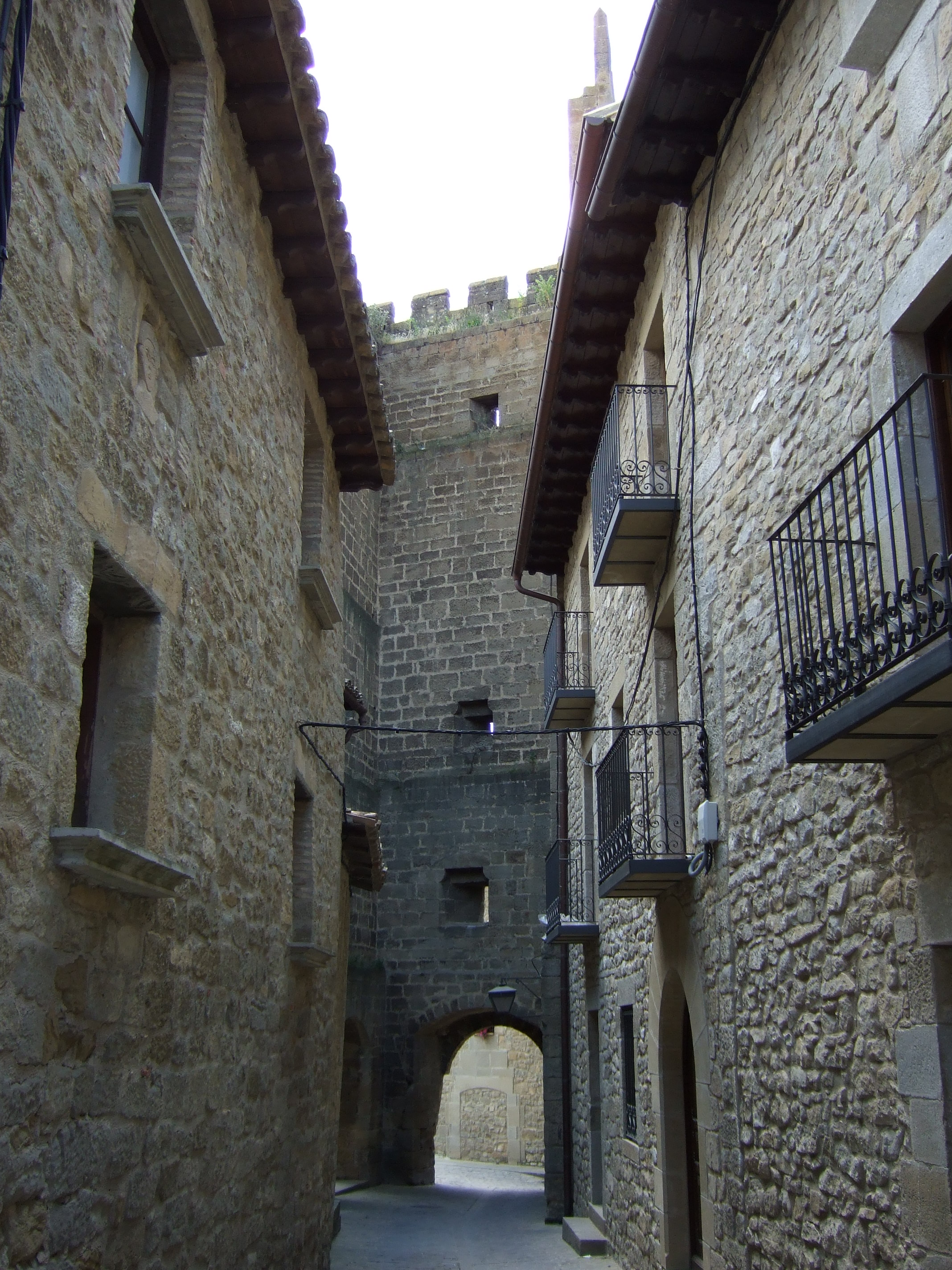
City-wall gate in Sos del Rey Católico.

Cinco Villas, in Aragonese: Zinco Billas, is a comarca in Aragon, Spain.

This comarca is named after the five historical towns of Tauste, Ejea de los Caballeros (capital comarcal), Sádaba, Uncastillo and Sos del Rey Católico. The former capital of the area was Sos del Rey Católico. Cinco Villas borders with Navarre in the west and completely surrounds its exclave of Petilla de Aragón.

== Municipalities ==
Ardisa, Asín, Bagüés, Biel, Biota, Castejón de Valdejasa, Castiliscar, Ejea de los Caballeros, Erla, El Frago, Isuerre, Layana, Lobera de Onsella, Longás, Luesia, Luna, Marracos, Navardún, Orés, Las Pedrosas, Piedratajada, Los Pintanos, Puendeluna, Sádaba, Sierra de Luna, Sos del Rey Católico, Tauste, Uncastillo, Undués de Lerda, Urriés and Valpalmas.

== See also ==
- Castejón Mountains
- Comarcas of Aragon
