= Bordure =

Heraldic ordinary or subordinary

A bordure Gules

The arms of Thomas de Holland, showing a bordure ermine and bordure argent

The arms of Richard of Conisburgh, 3rd Earl of Cambridge, with a bordure argent semy of lions purpure – the lions alluding to those of León in the arms of his mother

In heraldry, a bordure is a band of contrasting tincture forming a border around the edge of a shield, traditionally one-sixth as wide as the shield itself. It is sometimes reckoned as an ordinary and sometimes as a subordinary.

A bordure encloses the whole shield, with two exceptions:

- When two coats of arms are combined by impalement, the bordure usually stops at the partition line and does not run down it, as shown in the arms of Kemp as Archbishop of Canterbury in the 15th century; this rule is considered a relic of the older practice of dimidiation. However, a notable exception to this rule can be seen in the arms of Thomas de Holland, Duke of Surrey (a nephew of Richard II) from a drawing of his seal, 1399, showing a differencing of a full bordure ermine, and a full bordure argent.
- A chief overlies a bordure, unless the bordure is added to a coat that previously included a chief, or so it is often said. In practice, the order in which things are to overlie each other can usually be inferred from the blazon. For example, in the arms of Amber Valley Borough Council, the blazon describes the bordure before the chief, and the bordure does not surround the chief; while in the arms of the British Columbia Institute of Technology, the blazon specifies a chief ... within a bordure.

Like any ordinary or other charge, a bordure may be of a single plain tincture or divided. Like any ordinary, it may be smooth or subjected to any of the lines of variation; it may form a field for other charges. These variations are effectively exploited in the Scottish system of cadency.

Since it is very often used for cadency rather than to distinguish between original coats, the bordure is not strictly held to the rule of tincture; for example, many cadets of the French royal house, for example, bore red bordures on a blue field. Rarely a bordure is of the same tincture as the field on which it lies; in this case the term "embordured" is employed. This was a very unusual practice even centuries ago and is all but unheard-of today.

A bordure semy of some charge is shown as if it were charged with a great number of those charges, rather than the practice typical with a field, in which some of the charges are shown as "cut off" by the edges of the field. This large number is to be taken as semy, and not as the precise number shown.

In French heraldry, the diminutive of the bordure, one quarter of its width, is the filière. In English-language heraldry, the term a bordure diminished is occasionally employed – as in 'Or; a diminished bordure vert; on a chief indented azure, two fleurs de lys or' (127th Field Artillery, US), and 'Or; representations of two San human figures of red ochre, statant respectant, the hands of the innermost arms clasped, with upper arm, inner wrist, waist and knee bands argent; and a narrow border of red ochre' (Republic of South Africa).

An example of a bordure indented (in the lower half)

== On flags ==
=== In current sovereign flags ===
Flag of Grenada

Flag of Montenegro featuring a gold filière (bordure diminished)

Flag of Nepal
(filière)

Flag of Sri Lanka with its gold bordure

Flag of Maldives with its red bordure

=== Current sub-national ===
Flag of Sint Eustatius
(a constituent 'public body' island of the Caribbean Netherlands within the Kingdom of the Netherlands)

Flag of Piedmont, Italy

Flag of Benna, Province of Biella, Piedmont Region, Italy

Flag of Terengganu, Malaysia

Flag of the Uva Province, Sri Lanka

Flag of the Emirates of Ras Al Khaimah and Sharjah, United Arab Emirates

Flag of Guam (United States)
(filière)

Flag of West Virginia, US

Flag of Wyoming, US

=== Current municipal ===
Flag of Cartagena, Colombia

Flag of Cetinje, Montenegro

Flag of Puendeluna, Spain

Flag of Castilleja del Campo, Seville, Andalusia, Spain

Flag of Pozoantiguo, Zamora, Castile and León, Spain

Flag of Kyiv, Ukraine

Flag of Mariupol, Donetsk Oblast, Ukraine

Flag of Greater Manchester (unofficial), England, United Kingdom

Flag of San Francisco, California, US

Flag of Goldfield, Colorado, Colorado, US

Flag of Savannah, Georgia, US

Flag of Springfield, Massachusetts, US

Flag of New Castle County, Delaware, US

Flag of Zia Pueblo, New Mexico, US

Flag of Bismarck, North Dakota, US

Flag of Loudoun County, Virginia, US

== See also ==
- Bordure componée
- Orle
- Fillet (heraldry)
