= Biota, Cinco Villas =

Biota
- municipality
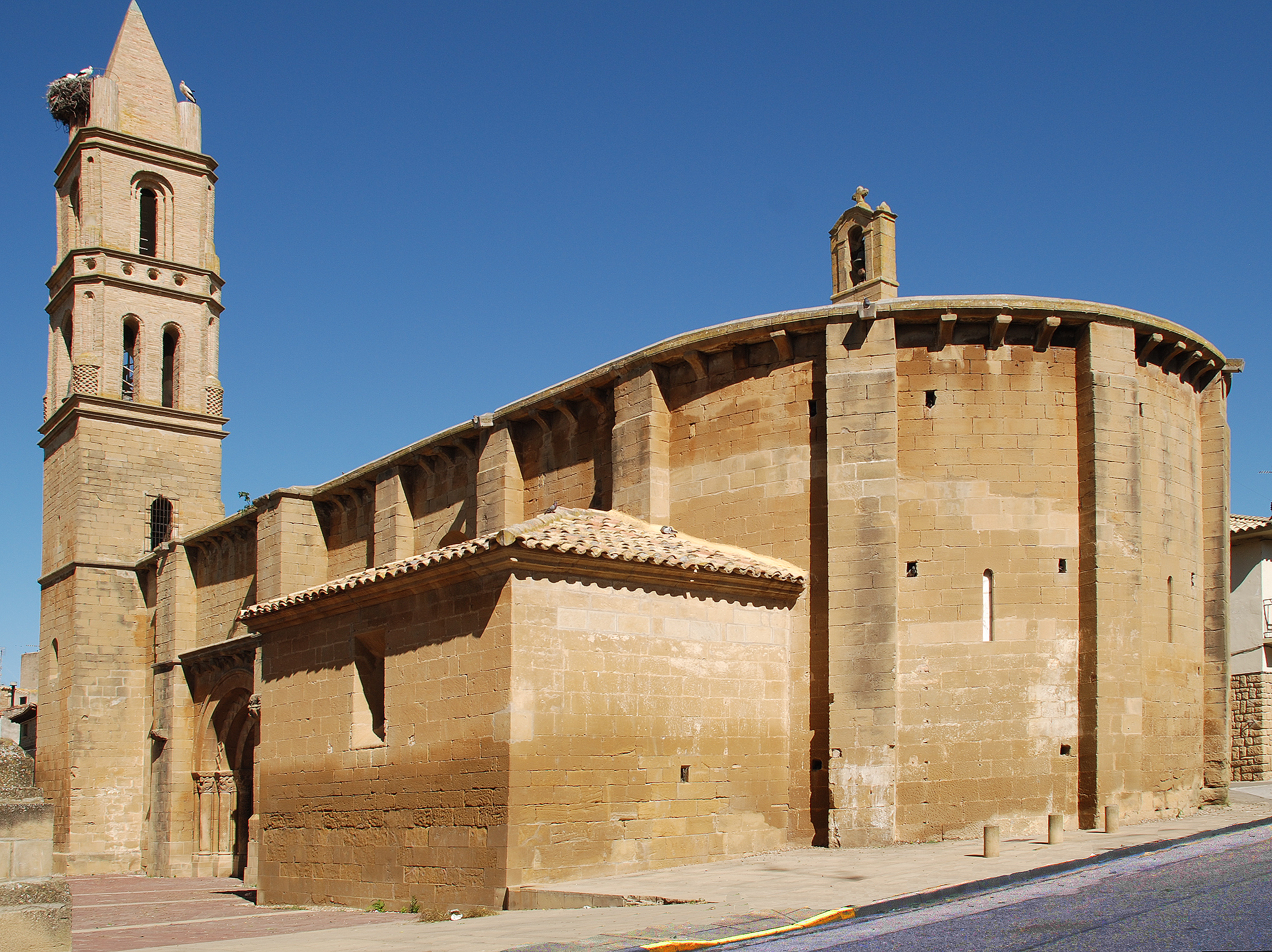

- Flag Coat of arms

- Location in Spain. Biota (Spain) Biota (Europe)
- Coordinates: 42°15′N 1°10′W
- Country: Spain
- Autonomous community: Aragon
- Province: Zaragoza

Area
  - Total: 11.16 km^{2} (4.31 sq mi)

Population (2025-01-01)
  - Total: 832
  - Density: 74.6/km^{2} (193/sq mi)
- Time zone: UTC+1 (CET)
  - Summer (DST): UTC+2 (CEST)

Biota is a municipality of Spain belonging to the province of Zaragoza, autonomous community of Aragon. The town is part of the Cinco Villas Region and it is located on the banks of the Arba de Luesia River. It has an area of 128.8 km^{2} with a population of 912 inhabitants.

== Geography ==
Biota borders Uncastillo to the north and northwest, Sádaba to the west, Luesia and Asín to the east, and Ejea de los Caballeros to the south.

Its municipal area is crossed by the Arba de Luesia River, one of the two branches of the Arba River, although part of the western border with Ejea de los Caballeros is formed by the Farasdués River, a tributary of the Arba de Luesia.

In its municipality is the San Bartolomé reservoir, a small reservoir for storing water from the Bardenas canal.

== History ==
Biota is located in a strategic place, controlling one of the fords of the Arba River where a fortress or castle was built, of which a defense tower is preserved for its control.

It was conquered by Aragonese king Sancho Ramírez in 1091, and the placename of Biota is thereby first found in a written source in its immediate donation to Fortún Aznárez in September 1091.

In the following centuries Biota remained a non-religious lordship.

== Demographics ==
Demographic Timeline of Biota
1842	1877	1887	1897	1900	1910	1920	1930	1940	1950	1960	1970	1981	1991	2001	2001
540	1135	1132	1092	1142	1198	1472	1589	1715	1713	1736	1601	1510	1306	1200	1135

== Municipal administration ==
Mayors of Biota
Period	Mayor	Party
1979-1983	José Lasheras Garcés ]	PSOE
1983-1987		
1987-1991	José Lasheras Garcés	PSOE
1991-1995	Luis Perez Perez	PSOE
1995-1999	Juan Carlos Gimenez Abad	PP
1999-2003	Victor Orduna Larriqueta	PSOE
2003-2007	Victor Orduna Larriqueta	PSOE
2007-2011	Victor Orduna Larriqueta	PSOE
2011-2015	Mariano Abad Torrero ]	PP
2015-2019	Ezequiel Marco Elorri ]	PSOE

== See also ==
- List of municipalities in Zaragoza
