= Battle of Épila =

1348 battle

Coordinates: 41°35′55″N 1°16′47″W

Battle of Epila
Date	July 21, 1348
Location	Épila (Zaragoza)
Result	Victory for King Peter IV of Aragon

Belligerents
Union of Aragon	Peter IV of Aragon

Commanders and leaders
Ferdinand of Aragon; Juan Ximénez de Urrea, Lord of Biota	Don Lope de Luna.

Strength
15,000	

The Battle of Épila was fought on July 21, 1348, near Zaragoza, in what is now Spain, between the supporters of the Union of Aragon and King Peter IV, led by Don Lope de Luna. This battle was the culmination of a long confrontation between a large segment of the nobility and the people of Aragon against the king, ending with the decisive defeat of the Union.

== Background ==
The start of direct conflict between the King of Aragon and much of the nobility and the towns of the kingdom went back to the year 1282, following the conquest of Sicily by Peter III and his excommunication by Pope Martin IV and subsequent Aragonese Crusade. To achieve more effective pressure on the king and protect each other, the nobility of Aragon signed the Oath of the Union, in which they pledged support for each other against the king of Aragon in the event he attempted to undermine their privileges. The first noble rebellion was later expanded to include the Union of Aragon and major cities, including the city of Zaragoza, capital of the Kingdom of Aragon.

Following the meeting of the Cortes in Zaragoza in 1283, Peter III was forced to accept the demands of the General Privilege of the Union, which expanded in 1287 during the reign of his son Alphonso III regarding the privileges of the Union.

== The Union against Peter IV ==
Peter IV had become king of Aragon in 1336, following the death of his father Alfonso IV. His first major domestic problem occurred in 1347 with the reactivation of the Union of Aragon. The original purpose of the confrontation was in Peter IV's decision to acknowledge his daughter Constance as heiress to the Crown of Aragon, which infringed the rights of the Infante James, his own brother. As acting Governor of Aragon, James immediately went to Zaragoza to seek the support of the Aragonese nobility against the royal decision. The rebelling nobles again swore allegiance to the Union in support of the Infante movement; to which the majority of municipalities soon joined, including the capital. There was also a similar Union organized in the Kingdom of Valencia. The Principality of Catalonia remained loyal to the king.

At first, Peter IV sought to resolve the situation by resorting to diplomacy: Cortes convened in Zaragoza and gave their revocation of his decision and instead agreed to confirm the privileges of the Union of 1287. From that moment, the only possible solution was armed conflict.

Following the Cortes decision, Infante James died in Barcelona, possibly poisoned by order of Peter IV. At the end of 1287, fighting occurred in the two kingdoms of Aragon and Valencia: First, the Union of Valencia defeated the royalists at Largo and Bétera, but in Aragon, King Peter IV attracted major Aragonese nobles like Lope de Luna and the village communities of Daroca and Teruel to his aid. In early 1348, Peter IV managed to reach an agreement with the Valencian Union so that any military activity was concentrated thereafter in the Kingdom of Aragon.

== The battle ==
By the spring of 1348 the Unionists had concentrated all their forces in Zaragoza, reluctant to work with the nobles who still supported the king. For his part, Lope de Luna attempted to take the city of Tarazona, a member city of the Union. In early July, Peter IV, with the kingdom of Valencia pacified and the support of the inhabitants of Teruel, Daroca and Calatayud, marched on Zaragoza intending to end the revolt. The Unionists, realizing they could not cope with the united forces of Peter IV and Lope de Luna, tried to cut them off, taking a central location that was in the hands of the royalists, the village of Épila. Lope de Luna understood that if the Unionists took Épila he would be blocked and unable to receive support from King Peter. Therefore, Lope de Luna immediately left the siege of Tarazona and force-marched towards Épila to stop the Unionist Army.
There followed the final battle on July 21, 1348.

== Royal Army ==
'In Épila'

- Blasco de Alagon.
- Thomas Cornel.
- Martin Lopez de Pomar-warden.

'Army of Lope de Luna'

- Lope de Luna, with 400 knights.
- Alvar García de Albornoz with 600 knights.
- Daroca laborers.

== Union Army ==
- Infante Ferdinand of Aragon.
- Juan Ximénez de Urrea, lord of Biota.
- Juan Ximénez de Urrea, captain of the Union.
- Laborers in Zaragoza.
- 15,000 men of mixed knights, men-at-arms and regular soldiery.

=== Development ===
The battle began on the morning of July 21 with an attempt by Union troops, led by Juan Ximénez de Urrea, Jr., to occupy Épila. Blasco de Alagon had taken refuge inside Épila, his mission was to defend the place until the core troops of Peter IV joined with those of Lope de Luna. The frontal attack was very intense but the Unionists lacked sufficient troops to overcome the defenses and did not have time to prepare, knowing that Lope de Luna had left the siege of Tarazona and was marching towards Jalón to force a confrontation. Repulsed at their first assault, the Unionists burned the crops and the suburbs in an attempt to force a showdown in the open.

The center of the battle was the bridge over the Jalón river. Unionists tried to hold it until Castilian mercenaries commanded by Gómez de Albornoz arrived. The inexperienced laborers of Zaragoza could not stop several hundred well-armed and experienced horsemen. The Castilian mercenaries not only made their way to the other side but directly attacked the rebellious Aragonese nobles who remained in reserve. Some of the Aragonese immediately took flight as the Unionist troops were unable to halt the cavalry. Only those most committed to the noble cause entered the battle with the intention of withstanding until nightfall. But eventually resistance broke, causing the deaths or capture of the principal leaders of the Aragonese Union.

== Consequences ==
The victory of the royalist troops at the battle of Épila was complete and final. Those killed were the chief supporters of the Union; Juan Ximénez de Urrea, Lord of Biota, Tramacet Jimen Gombal and Perez de Pina. The prisoners were: Juan Ximénez de Urrea, son of the former, who had led the Union army in the action at Valencia and was executed a few days later; and Pedro Fernandez, Lord of Híjar. Infante Ferdinand himself, who had been captured by Castilian soldiers, was sent to Castile, fearing that Peter IV would order him executed.

King Peter IV convened the Cortes in Zaragoza and awarded the title of "Count" to Lope de Luna, the first nobleman in Aragon to get this title without belonging to the royal family. On October 4, 1348, the Parliament of Aragon revoked all privileges and rights of the Unionists and Peter IV destroyed the documents of the collected privileges. However, the king extended the powers of the Justice of Aragon to mediate conflicts between the Aragonese and the monarch, so that much of the rights that the nobles, which had been attributed to the Union, were safeguarded in the figure of Justice and extended to all the Aragonese.
