= Fuencalderas (Aragon) =

Village in Spain

Fuencalderas is a village of the autonomous community of Aragon, in Spain, in the comarca (county) of the Cinco Villas (“Five Villages”), in the province of Zaragoza. Until 1975 was an independent municipality, year in which was fused with the municipality of Biel, giving place to the municipality of Biel-Fuencalderas. In 1996 step to be constituted as "Lower Local Entity" ("Entidad Local Menor") within the same municipality (later, in 1998, the municipality Biel-Fuencalderas changed his name for that one of Biel).

Area details and town have been extracted of sources and, respectively.

== Situation ==
The municipal district of Fuencalderas this situated in the northeast of the Aragonese comarca of Cinco Villas. Is spread in the aspect south of the mountain called "Sierra of Santo Domingo", which is part of Pyrenean foothills called Pre-Pyrenees," , in an area situated between basins of the rivers Gállego, to the east, and Arba de Biel, to the west. It has an area of 36 km².

The village center is accessed to through the road A-1202 of Ayerbe to Sádaba. Fuencalderas is situated to 6 km from Biel, 18 km of Santa Eulalia de Gállego, 26 km of Ayerbe, 55 km from Huesca and 105 km of Zaragoza.

The village center this situated to 842 metres of altitude, situating his municipal field between 650 metres on the sea level of the “Chabastre" and the 1.329 of "A Ralla d'as Pauletas".

== History ==
The conquest of the county by Aragonese Christians was in the 10th century, although the name of “Fonte Calderas” (“Hot Source”) does not appear until 1137 in a donation by the Aragonese king Ramiro II "The Monk". As a result of the conquest a defense tower was built in the place called the “Pacatorre”, to whose protection began to form Fuencalderas.

Nonetheless, the origin of Fuencalderas would have relationship with the town of Liso (according to some sources "Eliso") that was situated to 10 km to the north of Fuencalderas. Liso could have Roman origin and whose first mention documentary dated already of the year 938. From the 10th to 12th centuries Liso was an important part of the defensive line of the Kingdom of Aragon in the region, reaching the range “Burgh of Liso”, while that Fuencalderas was of little entity. The decline of Liso from the 13th through 15th centuries was neck-and-neck with the progressive consolidation of Fuencalderas, when being situated in a field but favorable. Finally, in 1530, the parish is moved from Liso to Fuencalderas.

The history of Fuencalderas takes place within the history of the Kingdom of Aragon and, later, of that one of Spain.

After the military coup d’état of the year 1936 finally led by the general Francisco Franco the municipality was controlled for elements related to the uprising. The later Civil Sar that was produced as a result of the same one had tragic consequences for part of the village's people.

Completed 2nd World War, the Communist Party of Spain and others organized a "guerilla" in the hinterland of Spain that had a certain activity in the municipality of Fuencalderas. Some authors suggest that Mariano Navarro from Fuencalderas, that arrived to be lieutenant of the army that kept up loyal to the government during the civil war, was the member of the guerilla "El Tuerto of Fuencalderas".

Until 1975, Fuencalderas was an independent municipality. In 1975 the Spanish Government, through Decree 1077/1975, combined the municipality of Fuencalderas with the límitrofe municipality of Biel, giving place to the creation of the municipality of Biel-Fuencalderas. By the end of the decade, with the arrival of the democracy, took place a movement citizen that as an objective had the constitution, again, of a separate municipality. September 3, 1993, on the dossier was initiated for the constitution of Fuencalderas as a Local Entity of territorial field lower than the municipality through written request of the majority of the neighbors living in the village, and for favorable agreement of the Plenary session of the local government of Biel-Fuencalderas. Finally, May 28, 1996, on, through the Decree 100/1996, the Government of Aragon approves the constitution of the village of Fuencalderas as a Local Entity of field lower than the municipal one ("Entidad Local Menor")).

According to the Aragonese legislation, Fuencalderas has responsibilities with regard to administration and capitalization of his assets, basic and elementary provision of services that affect him direct and exclusively (works in streets and country lanes, urban and rural police, activities in the public highway, public street lighting, drinkable water, suitable drainage and processing of sewages, road cleanup, refuse collection, cultural activities and social), works license assignment previous approval of the planeamiento and other delegated responsibilities for the municipality.

It has own mayor, chosen directly by his inhabitants.

== Administration ==
List of mayors
Legislatura	Nombre	Grupo
1979–1983	{}	{}
1983–1987	{}	{}
1987–1991	{}	{}
1991–1995	{}	{}
1995–1999	{}	{}
1999–2003	{}	{}
2003–2007	Francisco Javier Arbués	{}
2007–2011	Francisco Javier Arbués	{}

== Demography ==
Demographic evolution of Fuencalderas
1842	1877	1887	1897	1900	1910	1920	1930	1940	1950	1960	1970	1981 (1)	1991 (1)	2001 (1)
200	390	389	296	329	378	350	341	297	216	183	102	284	226	230

(1) The census of 1981 includes inhabitants of Biel.

== Natural environment and assets ==
It emphasizes especially all his natural environment. The wide levels difference of his municipal district does that is a great diversity forestal of beeches (some centenary ones), hollies, oaks, pine trees and boxwoods. The fauna is varied and it understands, between other, species of boars, deers, roes and foxes. a part of the mount is integrated in the nature reserve of Santo Domingo for several protected birds' conservation.

Also, Fuencalderas has singulars geomorphological accidents such as "O Salto" and "O Terrerno Blanco” (“White Field”); remains arquelógicos; remains of the last rural life such as farmyards, signals, etc.; legendary places as "Pata de Pierrondán" (“Leg of Pierrondan”); landscapes as the “Puente del Diablo” (“Fiend's Bridge”), the “peñas” of “Collas” and of the “Ferretes”, the cave of the “Caloyo”, the “Fayar” and magnificent views of the “Mallos de Riglos” and "Mallos de Agüero".

The village center has his origin in the 14th century. His characteristics are his internal design, based on a succession of small squares ("plazetas") and the construction of the houses, that still keep in mint condition his former physiognomy.

The current parish church of Our Lady of the Esperanza (“Hope”) was built on remains of another previous one. From the previous building are two chapels situated to feet and the tower, probably of the 14th century. It presents a style mix because of the elapsed time in his construction, although overall would be able to situate in the 16th century. The shed this built one in ashlars squared, is of rectangular plant and of only shed, completing with five lateral chapels. Covers, in barrel vault with “lunetos”, would be of the 18th century. His tower holds three bells and the public clock.

Saint Michael's of Liso hermitage is situated at the 10 km from the village center, in what is supposed are remains of the church of former Liso village. This hermitage conserve a romanesque apse of the 12th century, separated from the body of the building ("castillazo"). In the 17th century, once disappeared former Liso village, was reconstructed as romanesque church with “jaquesa” (“from Jaca”) influence, adding important architectural elements of the previous church (capitals, “ejedrezados”, funerary trails, an Aragonese “crismon”, etc.). Next to the hermitage there are the remains of a defensive an older turret. Additionally annexes, the so-called house of the recluse is found built with ashlars of the former church and that today is kept and used by Liso's Saint Michael Confraternity of Fuencalderas.

== Holidays and traditions ==
September 29, Saint Michael, pattern of the village, celebrating on Pentecost Sunday a pilgrimage to Liso's Saint Michael hermitage (until 1971 the pilgrimage was celebrated May 8, date in which the "visitation of the saint” is commemorated).

December 18, Virgin of the Esperanza (“Hope”).

January 19, San Sebastian's eve, the custom was practiced of turning on bonfires."Liso-Fuencalderas".

== Pattern ==
Saint Michael.

== Shield and flag ==
Through the Decree 168/2005 the Government of Aragon authorizes to the Town hall of Fuencalderas the adoption of the following municipal shield and flag:

Shield: square grassroots rounded, that brings, of azur, a pulled out gall oak of three raigones, golden; banding of silver with three sable boilers, two in the cantones of the head, and the other in the center of the tip. To the doorbell, closed Royal Crown.

Flag: blue pall, of proportion 2/3, a yellow gall oak and loaded white banding, in the angles, of four black boilers.

== Languages ==
Spanish and Aragonese.

== Distinguished personalities ==
In Fuencalderas have been born, among others, the following:

- Damián Iguacén Borau (February 12, 1916), priest (1941), bishop of Barbastro (1970–1974), Teruel-Albarracín (1974–1984) and Tenerife (1984), emeritus bishop of Tenerife (1991) and writer
- Ernesto Navarro Castán (July 25, 1934 - August 10, 1963, Grindelwald, canton of Bern, Swiss), alpinist y pioneer of the Aragonese mountaineering.

== Typical dishes ==
Herdsman's crumbs, lamb to the pastor, mushrooms and hunting (boar and deer).

== Activities and sports facilities ==
Fuencalderas has paths that allow that together the variety of his orografía it do ideal for the practice of the hiking. Fuencalderas is gone through by the Spanish GR-1 (long-distance footpath goes through the Iberian Peninsula, from Costa Brava to Galicia), has a varied natural environment and has a former assets architectura. Guidances about hiking in Fuencalderas have Been published of the mount of Fuencalderas.

The village has a “fronton” or “trinquet”.

Fuencalderas enjoys an associative important activity, taking into account the inhabitants number, and of a long tradition. Liso's Saint Michael Confraternity of Fuencalderas appears documented already in 1766. In April, 2000 became a Cultural Association registered in the record of the General Management of the Diputación General de Aragon (“General Council of Aragon”. In November, 2007 has 370 partners and it takes publishing the periodical bulletin Liso-Fuencalderas in an uninterrupted way from May 1971. In the same one history are picked up, traditions, nature, news, etc. relating to the village and to the confraternity.

== additional Bibliography ==
- "Fuencalderas" of Damián Iguacén Borau. 1979. Zaragoza.
- “Fuencalderas en mi recuerdo" (“Fuencalderas in my memory”) of José Arbués Posat. 1980. Girona.
- "Tradiciones, costumbres y lengua en Fuencalderas (Cinco Villas, Zaragoza)" of José Arbués Possat. 2013. Xordica Editorial. Zaragoza.
- "Historietas d'un lugar d'as Cinco Villas" of José Arbués Possat. Xordica Editorial. Zaragoza. 2015.
