= Marracos =

Coordinates: 41°12′32″N 0°46′33″W

- municipality
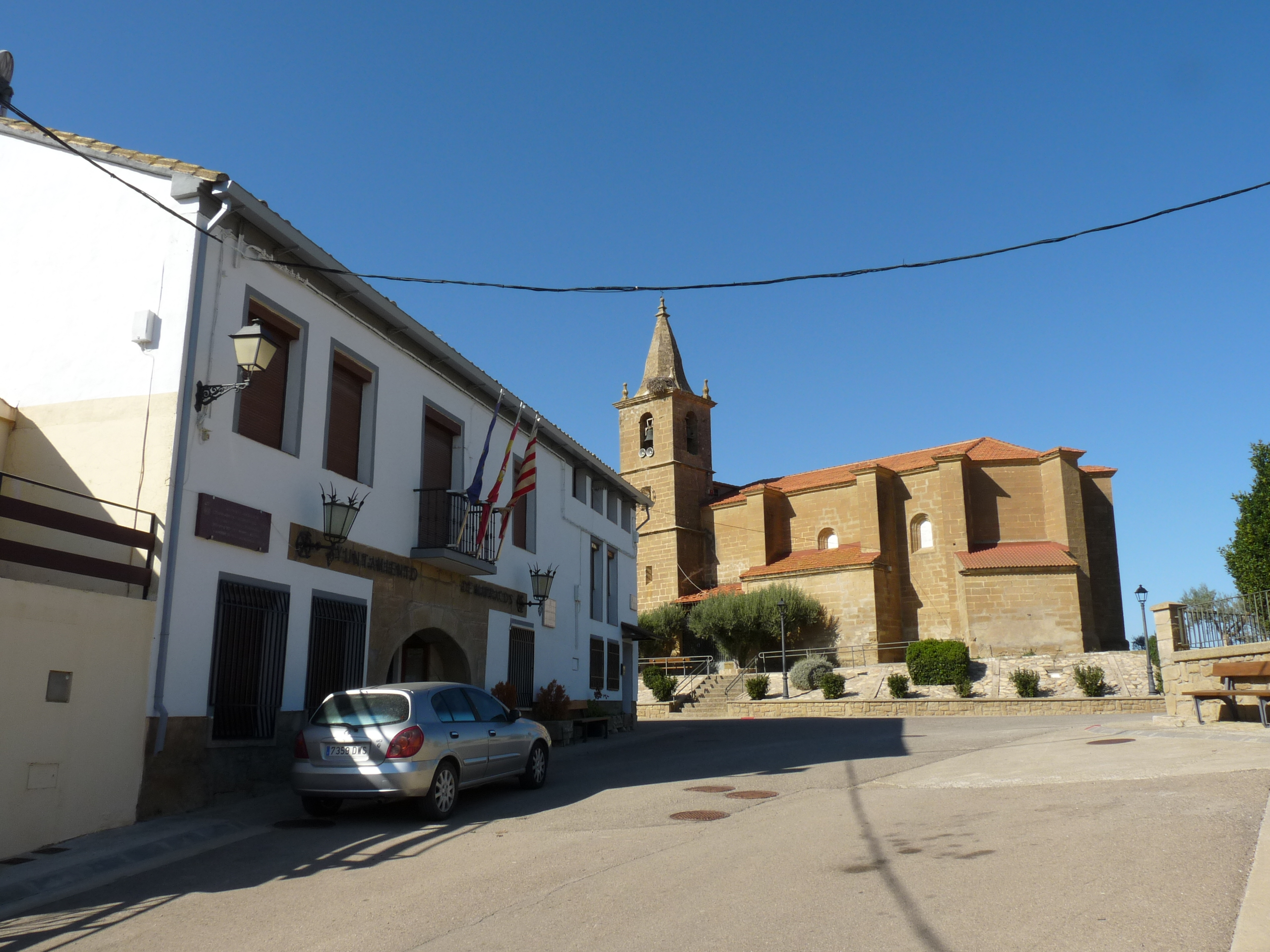
- Town hall and church in Marracos

- Flag Coat of arms
- Interactive map of Marracos
- Country: Spain
- Autonomous community: Aragon
- Province: Zaragoza
- Comarca: Cinco Villas
- Municipality: Marracos

Area
  - Total: 16.92 km^{2} (6.53 sq mi)

Population (2025-01-01)
  - Total: 82
  - Density: 4.8/km^{2} (13/sq mi)
- Time zone: UTC+1 (CET)
  - Summer (DST): UTC+2 (CEST)

Marracos is a municipality located in the province of Zaragoza, Aragon, Spain. According to the 2009 census (INE), the municipality has a population of 104 inhabitants. Its Postal Code is 50616

== See also ==
- List of municipalities in Zaragoza
