= Uncastillo =

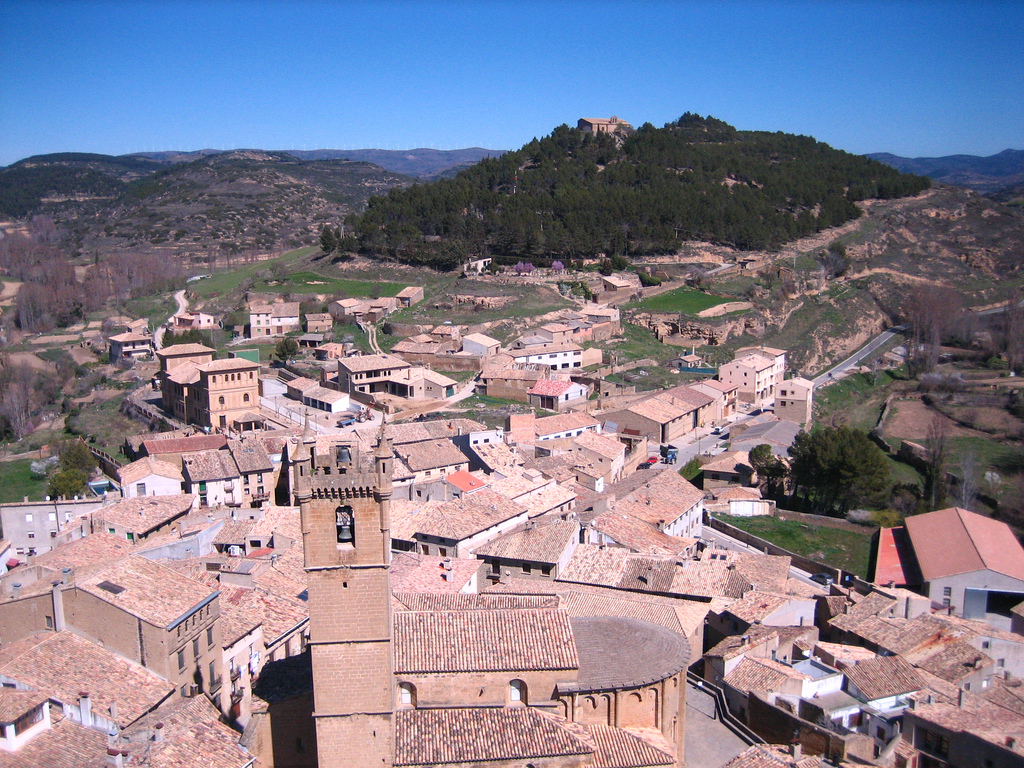

- Flag Coat of arms

- Location within Spain
- Coordinates: 42°22′N 1°08′W
- Country: Spain
- Autonomous community: Aragon
- Province: Zaragoza
- Comarca: Cinco Villas

Government
  - Mayor: Gemma de Uña

Area
  - Total: 231 km^{2} (89 sq mi)

Population (2025-01-01)
  - Total: 594
  - Density: 2.57/km^{2} (6.66/sq mi)
- Demonym: Uncastilleros
- Time zone: UTC+1 (CET)
  - Summer (DST): UTC+2 (CEST)

Uncastillo (Aragonese: Uncastiello) is a municipality in the province of Zaragoza, Aragon, eastern Spain. At the 2010 census, it had a population of 781.

Along with Sos d'o Rei Catolico, Exeya d'os Caballers, Sádaba and Tauste, Uncastillo is one of the five towns comprising the comarca of Cinco Villas.

In 1934 on October 5 violent events took place at Uncastillo as part of the Revolution of 1934 against the new government incorporating the reactionary CEDA party and resulted in severe reprisals in 1934 and again in 1936.

In 1966, Uncastillo was declared a Conjunto Histórico-Artístico. It has several Romanesque buildings, including the parish churches of St. Martin and Santa Maria and the churches of San Felices, San Andrés and San Juan. Its other landmarks include the castle and palace of Peter IV (14th century).

== Twin towns ==
- Morlaas, France

== See also ==
- Cinco Villas
- List of municipalities in Zaragoza
