= Navardún =

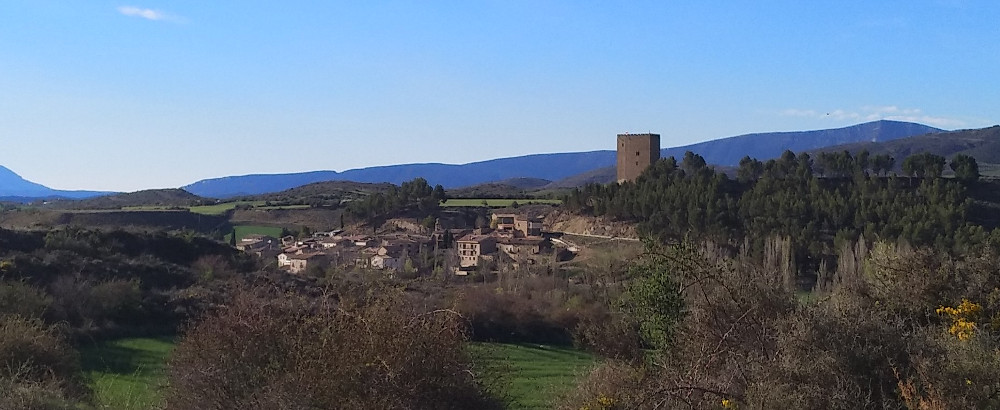

- Flag Coat of arms

- Location within Aragon Location within Spain Location within Europe
- Coordinates: 42°31′N 1°09′W
- Country: Spain
- Autonomous community: Aragon
- Province: Zaragoza
- Comarca: Cinco Villas
- Municipality: Navardún

Area
  - Total: 24 km^{2} (9.3 sq mi)

Population (2025-01-01)
  - Total: 35
  - Density: 1.5/km^{2} (3.8/sq mi)
- Time zone: UTC+1 (CET)
  - Summer (DST): UTC+2 (CEST)

Navardún is a municipality located in the province of Zaragoza, Aragon, Spain. According to the 2004 census (INE), the municipality has a population of 54 inhabitants.

== See also ==
- List of municipalities in Zaragoza
