= Longás =

Longás (Spanish) Longars (Aragonese)
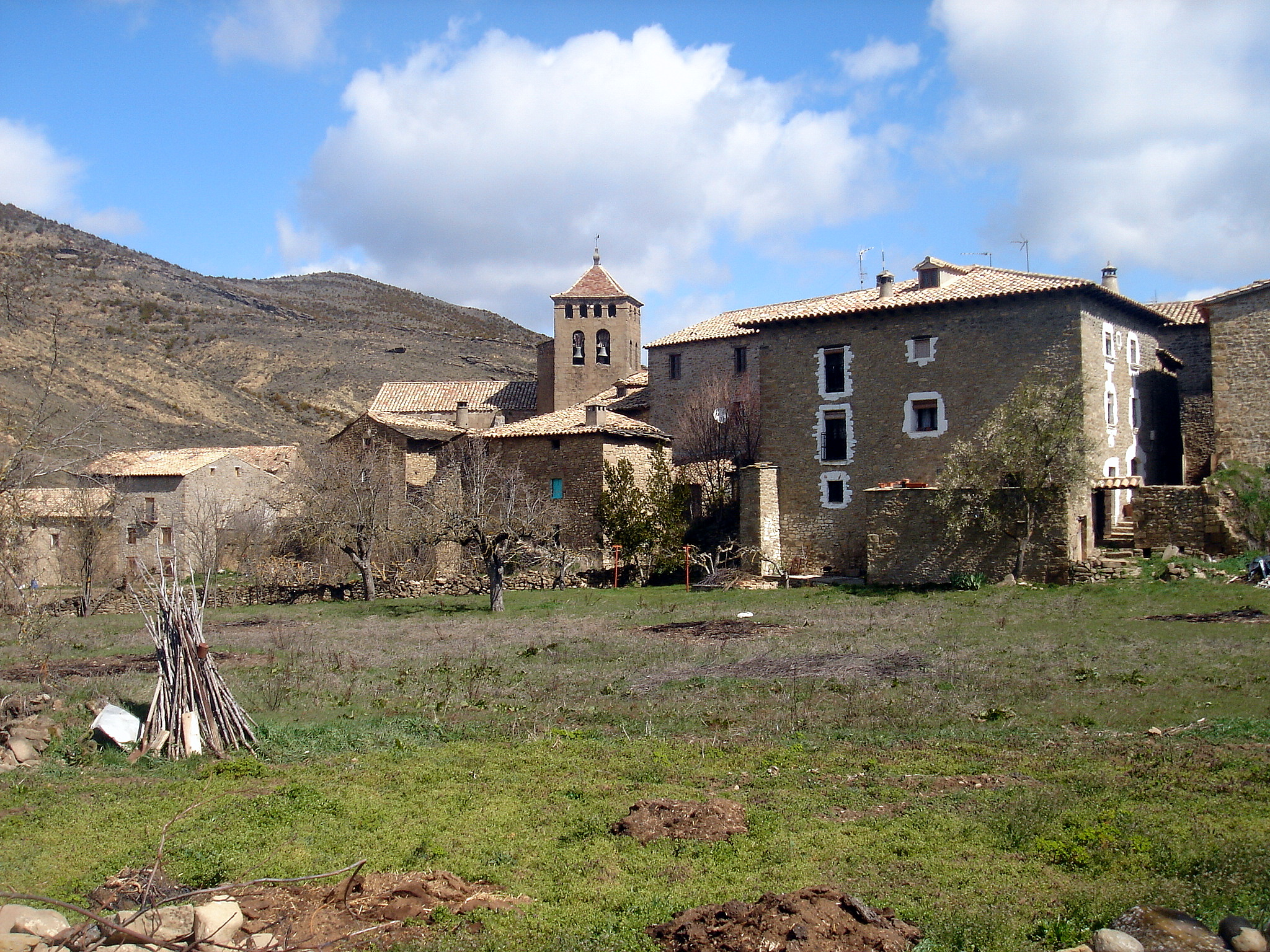

- Coat of arms

- Location within Aragon Location within Spain Location within Europe
- Country: Spain
- Autonomous community: Aragon
- Province: Zaragoza
- Comarca: Cinco Villas
- Municipality: Longás

Area
  - Total: 49 km^{2} (19 sq mi)

Population (2025-01-01)
  - Total: 45
  - Density: 0.92/km^{2} (2.4/sq mi)
- Time zone: UTC+1 (CET)
  - Summer (DST): UTC+2 (CEST)

Longás (in Aragonese: Longars) is a municipality located in the Cinco Villas comarca, province of Zaragoza, Aragon, Spain. According to the 2023 census (INE), the municipality has a population of 44 inhabitants.

== See also ==
- List of municipalities in Zaragoza
