= Erla =

- municipality
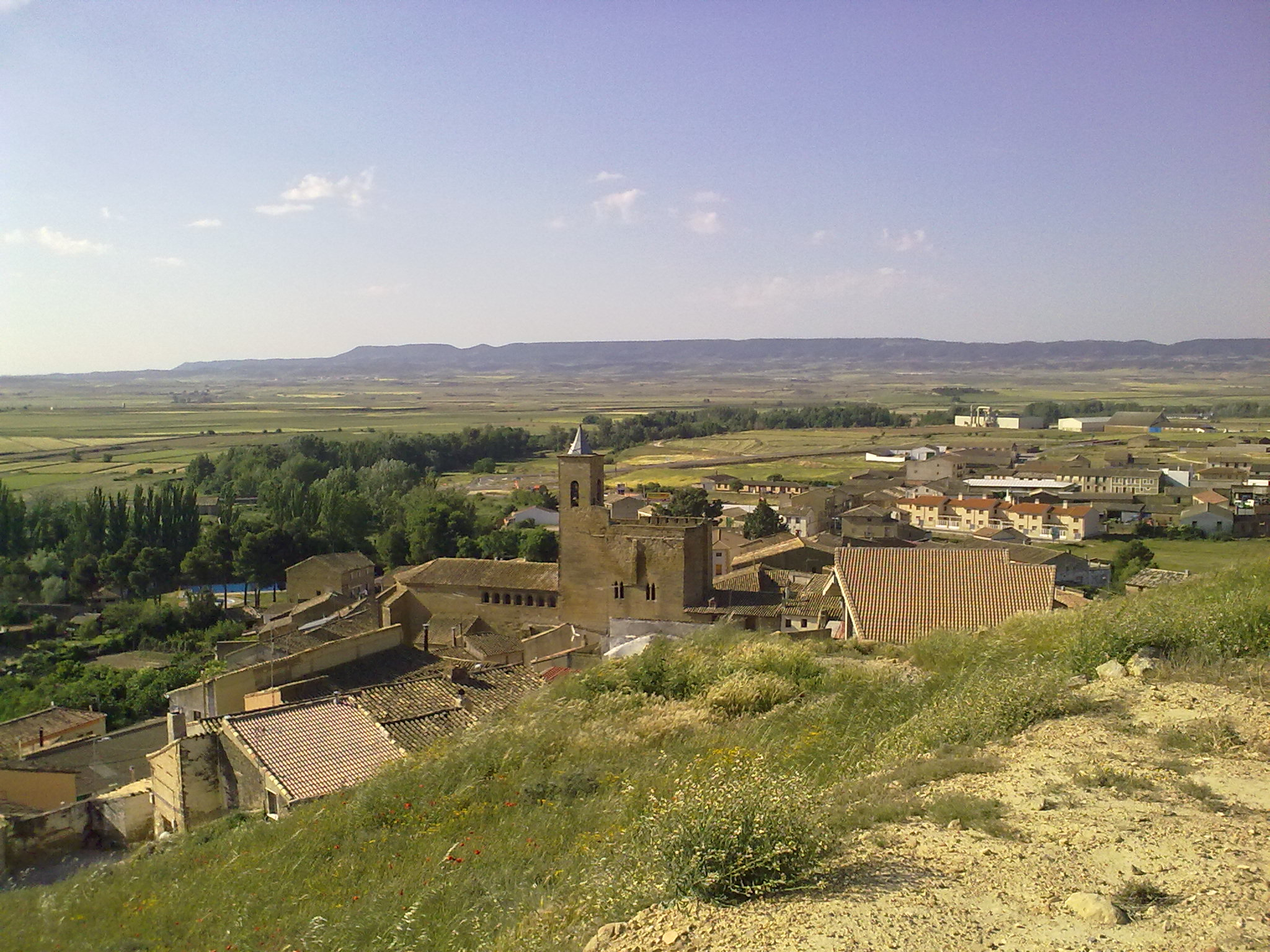

- Flag Coat of arms

- Location within Aragon Location within Spain Location within Europe
- Country: Spain
- Autonomous community: Aragon
- Province: Zaragoza
- Comarca: Cinco Villas, Aragon

Area
  - Total: 19 km^{2} (7.3 sq mi)

Population (2025-01-01)
  - Total: 374
  - Density: 20/km^{2} (51/sq mi)
- Time zone: UTC+1 (CET)
  - Summer (DST): UTC+2 (CEST)

Erla is a municipality in the province of Zaragoza, Aragon, Spain. According to the 2004 census (INE), the municipality has a population of 438 inhabitants.

== See also ==
- Castejón Mountains
- List of municipalities in Zaragoza
