= Sierra de Luna =

- municipality
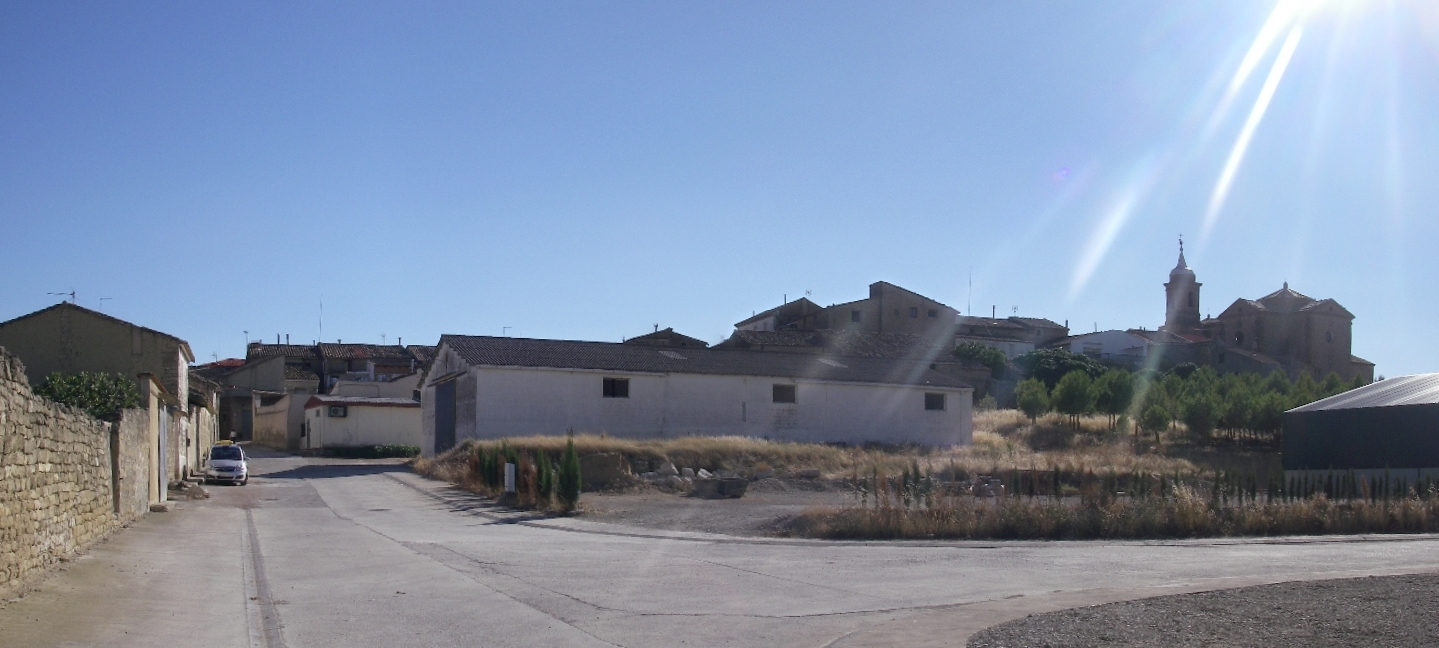

- Flag Coat of arms
- Interactive map of Sierra de Luna
- Coordinates: 42°03′N 0°55′W
- Country: Spain
- Autonomous community: Aragon
- Province: Zaragoza
- Comarca: Cinco Villas, Aragon

Area
  - Total: 43 km^{2} (17 sq mi)

Population (2025-01-01)
  - Total: 269
  - Density: 6.3/km^{2} (16/sq mi)
- Time zone: UTC+1 (CET)
  - Summer (DST): UTC+2 (CEST)

Sierra de Luna is a municipality located in the province of Zaragoza, Aragon, Spain. According to the 2004 census (INE), the municipality has a population of 269 inhabitants.

== See also ==
- List of municipalities in Zaragoza
