= Las Pedrosas =

Coordinates: 42°02′N 0°53′W

Las Pedrosas (Spanish) As Pedrosas (Aragonese)
- municipality
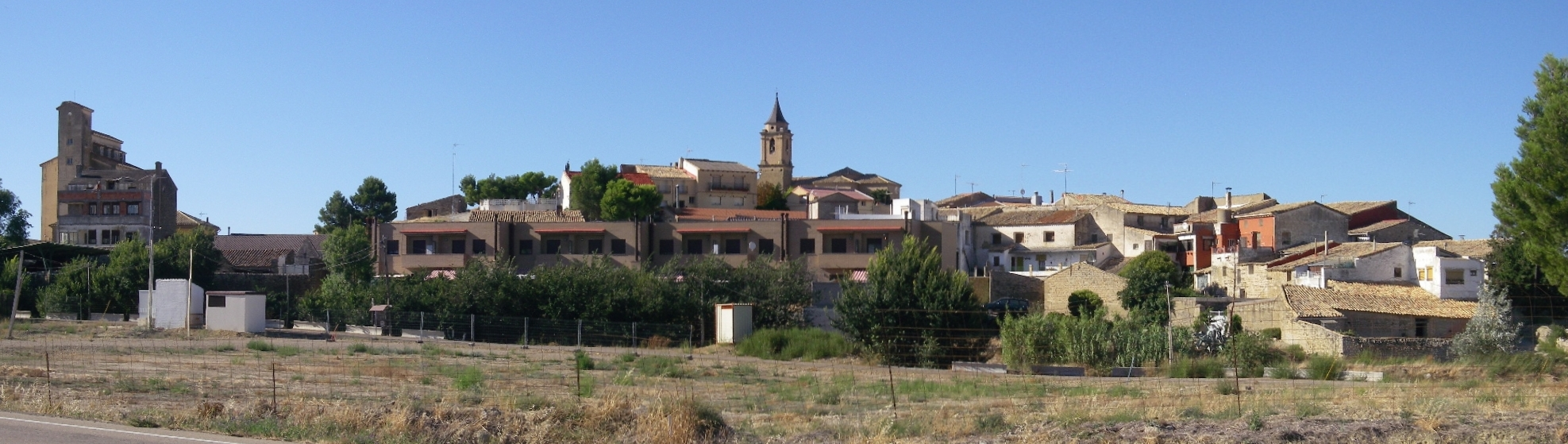
- view of Las Pedrosas

- Flag Coat of arms
- Interactive map of Las Pedrosas (Spanish)
- Country: Spain
- Autonomous community: Aragon
- Province: Zaragoza
- Comarca: Cinco Villas

Area
  - Total: 18 km^{2} (6.9 sq mi)
- Elevation: 475 m (1,558 ft)

Population (2025-01-01)
  - Total: 118
  - Density: 6.6/km^{2} (17/sq mi)
- Time zone: UTC+1 (CET)
  - Summer (DST): UTC+2 (CEST)
- Website: http://www.laspedrosas.net

Las Pedrosas (in Aragonese: As Pedrosas) is a municipality located in the province of Zaragoza, Aragon, Spain. According to the 2004 census (INE), the municipality has a population of 96 inhabitants.

== See also ==
- List of municipalities in Zaragoza
