= Asín =

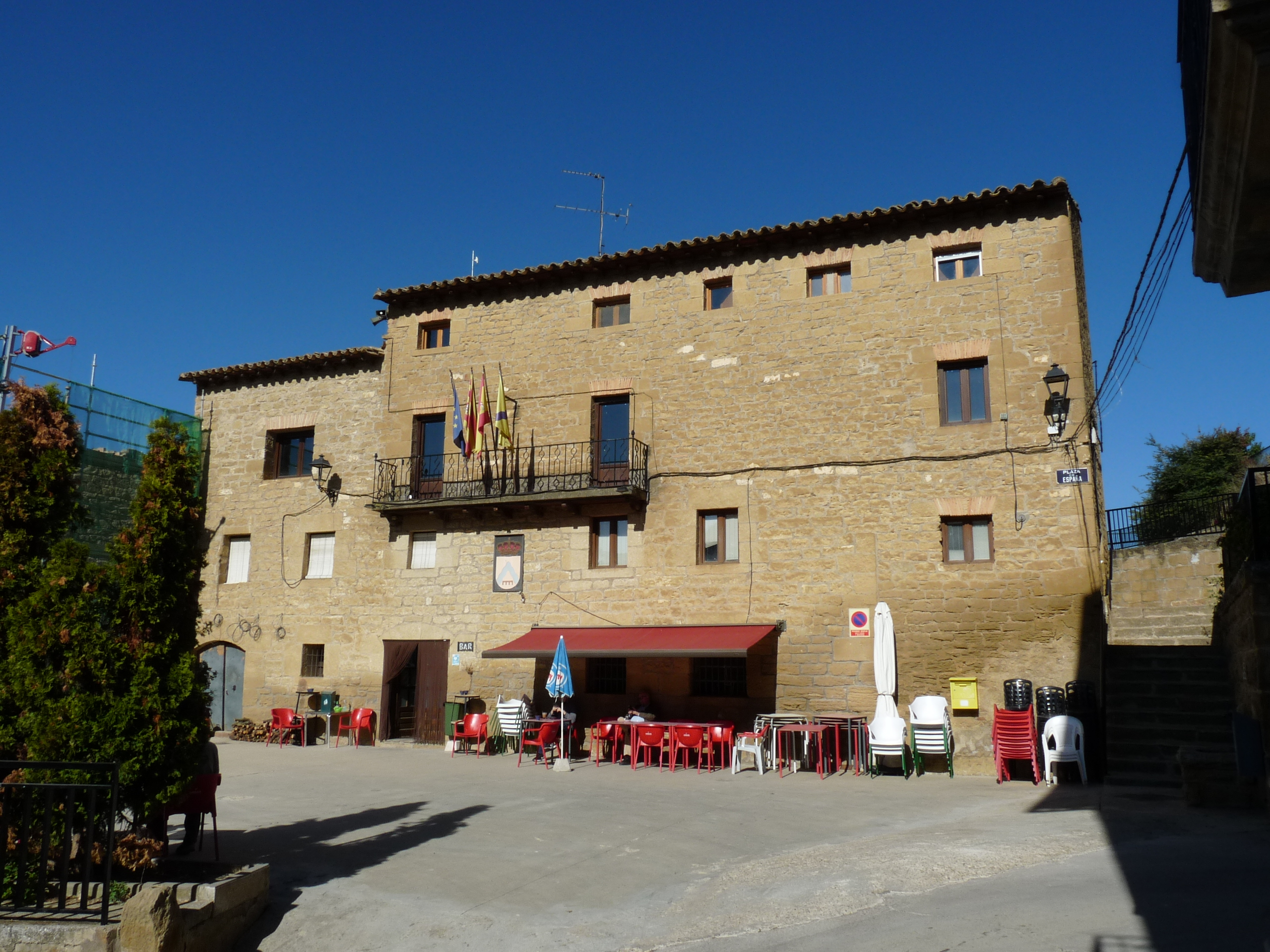
- Town hall

- Flag Coat of arms

- Location within Aragon Location within Spain Location within Europe
- Country: Spain
- Autonomous community: Aragon
- Province: Zaragoza
- Comarca: Cinco Villas, Aragon

Area
  - Total: 18 km^{2} (6.9 sq mi)

Population (2025-01-01)
  - Total: 88
  - Density: 4.9/km^{2} (13/sq mi)
- Time zone: UTC+1 (CET)
  - Summer (DST): UTC+2 (CEST)

Asín is a municipality located in the Cinco Villas comarca of the province of Zaragoza, Aragon, Spain, located a few kilometers west of Orés. According to the 2004 census (INE), the municipality has a population of 106 inhabitants.

== See also ==
- List of municipalities in Zaragoza
