= Piedratajada =

Coordinates: 42°07′N 0°48′W

Piedratajada (Spanish) Piedratallada (Aragonese)
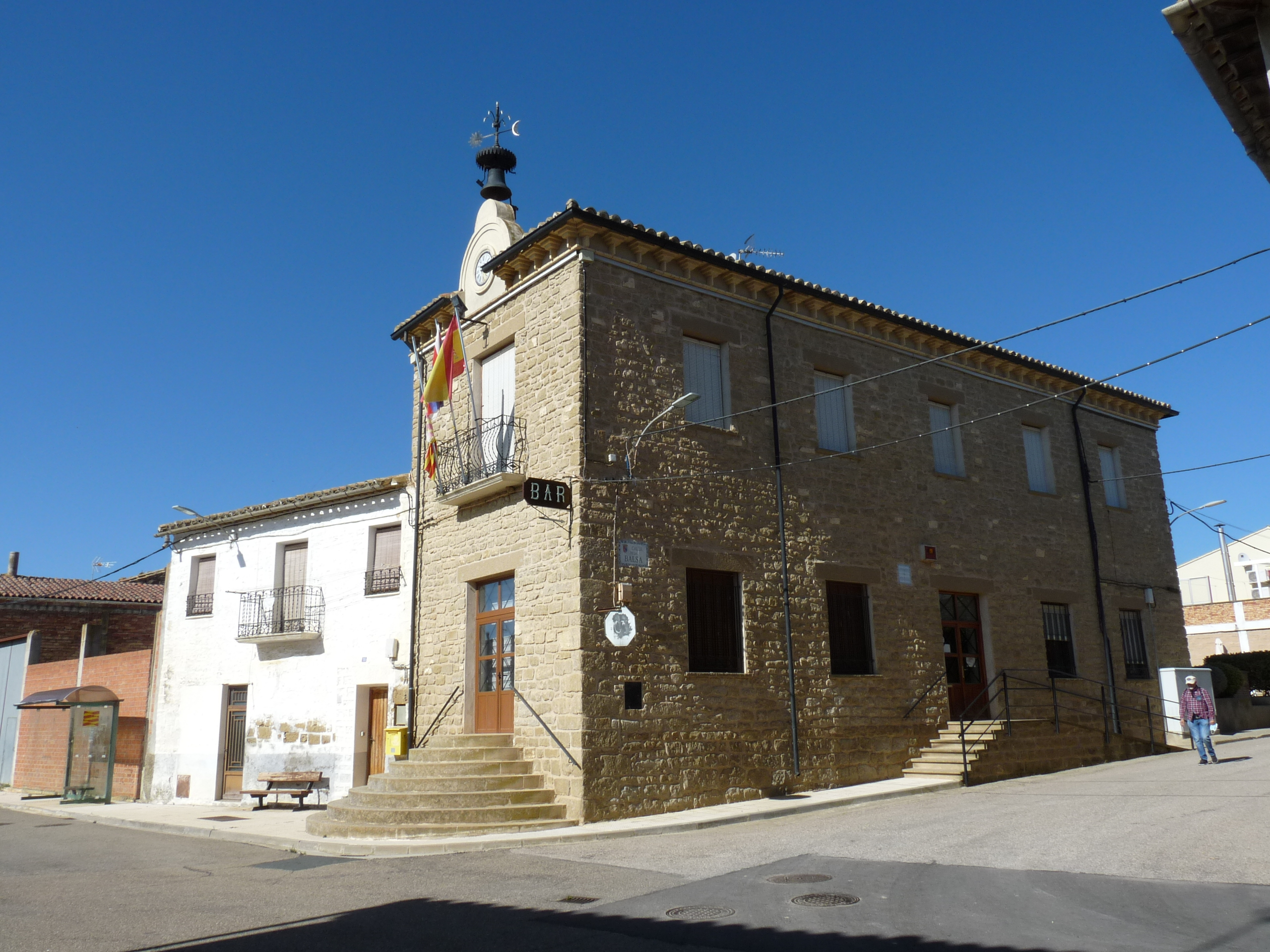
- Town hall

- Flag Coat of arms
- Interactive map of Piedratajada (Spanish)
- Country: Spain
- Autonomous community: Aragon
- Province: Zaragoza
- Comarca: Cinco Villas
- Municipality: Piedratajada

Area
  - Total: 39.5 km^{2} (15.3 sq mi)
- Elevation: 423 m (1,388 ft)

Population (2025-01-01)
  - Total: 96
  - Density: 2.4/km^{2} (6.3/sq mi)
- Time zone: UTC+1 (CET)
  - Summer (DST): UTC+2 (CEST)

Piedratajada (Piedratallada or Pietallada), is a municipality located in the province of Zaragoza, Aragon, Spain. According to the 2004 census (INE), the municipality has a population of 168 inhabitants.

== See also ==
- List of municipalities in Zaragoza
