= Los Pintanos =

Los Pintanos (Spanish) Os Pintanos (Aragonese)
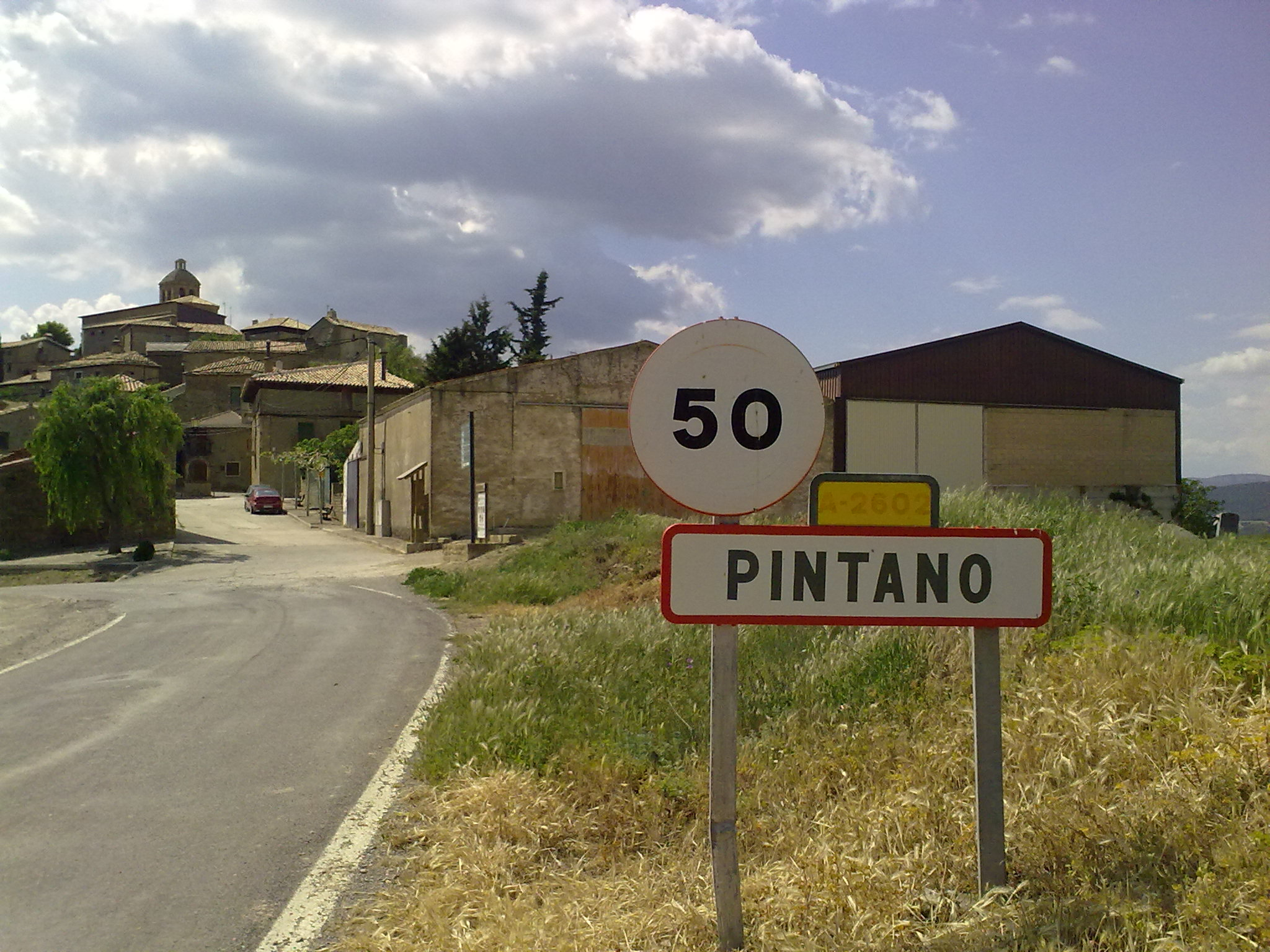
- Entrance to Los Pintanos Village
- Interactive map of Los Pintanos (Spanish)
- Coordinates: 42.5289°N 1.0211°W
- Country: Spain
- Autonomous community: Aragon
- Province: Zaragoza
- Municipality: Los Pintanos

Area
  - Total: 79 km^{2} (31 sq mi)

Population (2025-01-01)
  - Total: 37
  - Density: 0.47/km^{2} (1.2/sq mi)
- Time zone: UTC+1 (CET)
  - Summer (DST): UTC+2 (CEST)

Los Pintanos (in Aragonese: Os Pintanos) is a municipality located in the province of Zaragoza, Aragon, Spain. According to the 2004 census (INE), the municipality has a population of 102 inhabitants.

== See also ==
- List of municipalities in Zaragoza
