= Orés =

Coordinates: 42°17′N 1°00′W

- municipality
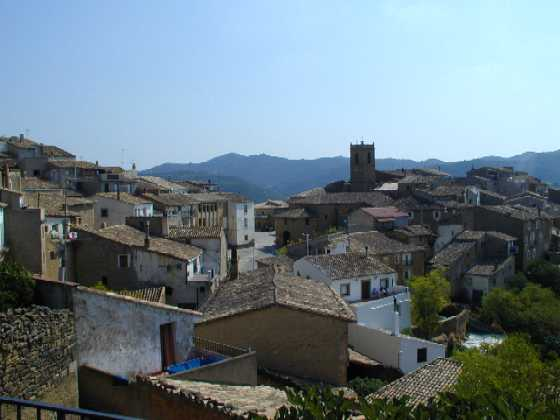
- View of Orés

- Flag Coat of arms
- Interactive map of Orés
- Country: Spain
- Autonomous community: Aragon
- Province: Zaragoza
- Comarca: Cinco Villas

Area
  - Total: 54.5 km^{2} (21.0 sq mi)
- Elevation: 647 m (2,123 ft)

Population (2025-01-01)
  - Total: 72
  - Density: 1.3/km^{2} (3.4/sq mi)
- Time zone: UTC+1 (CET)
  - Summer (DST): UTC+2 (CEST)

Orés is a municipality in the Cinco Villas, in the province of Zaragoza, in the autonomous community of Aragon, Spain. It is placed 104 km to the northwest of the provincial capital city, Zaragoza. Its coordinates are: 42° 17' N, 1° 00' W, and is located at 647 m over sea level. Nowadays Orés has only 101 inhabitants, although it attained a population of almost 1000 inhabitants during the 19th century.

== See also ==
- List of municipalities in Zaragoza
