= Castejón de Alarba =

Municipality in Zaragoza, Aragon, Spain

Castejón de Alarba, Spain
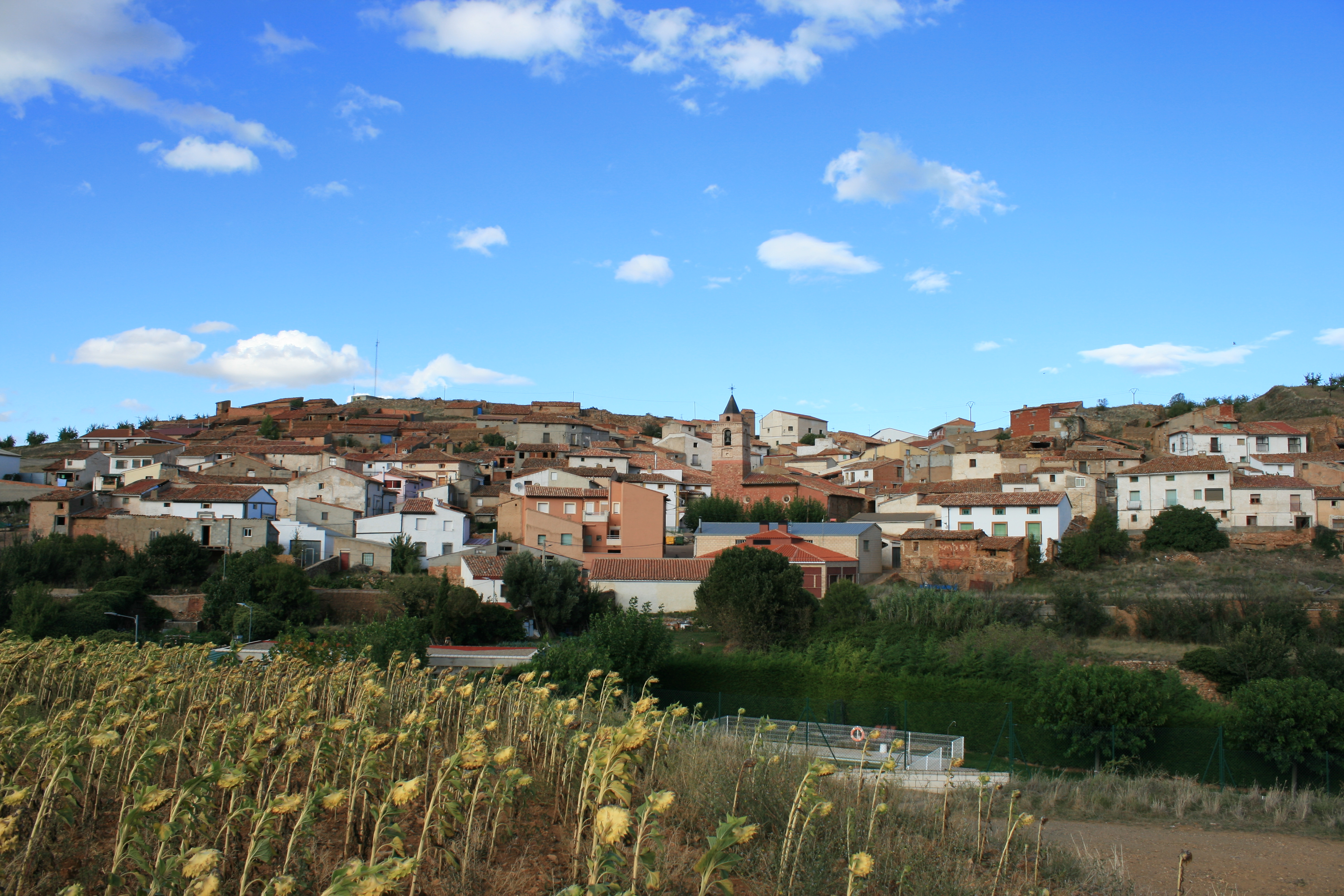

- Flag Coat of arms

- Location within Aragon Location within Spain Location within Europe
- Country: Spain
- Autonomous community: Aragon
- Province: Zaragoza
- Municipality: Castejón de Alarba

Area
  - Total: 17.48 km^{2} (6.75 sq mi)
- Elevation: 916 m (3,005 ft)

Population (2025-01-01)
  - Total: 75
  - Density: 4.3/km^{2} (11/sq mi)
- Time zone: UTC+1 (CET)
  - Summer (DST): UTC+2 (CEST)

Castejón de Alarba is a municipality located in the province of Zaragoza, Aragon, Spain. According to the 2004 census (INE), the municipality had a population of 98 inhabitants.

== See also ==
- List of municipalities in Zaragoza
