= Biel, Aragon =

Biel
- municipality
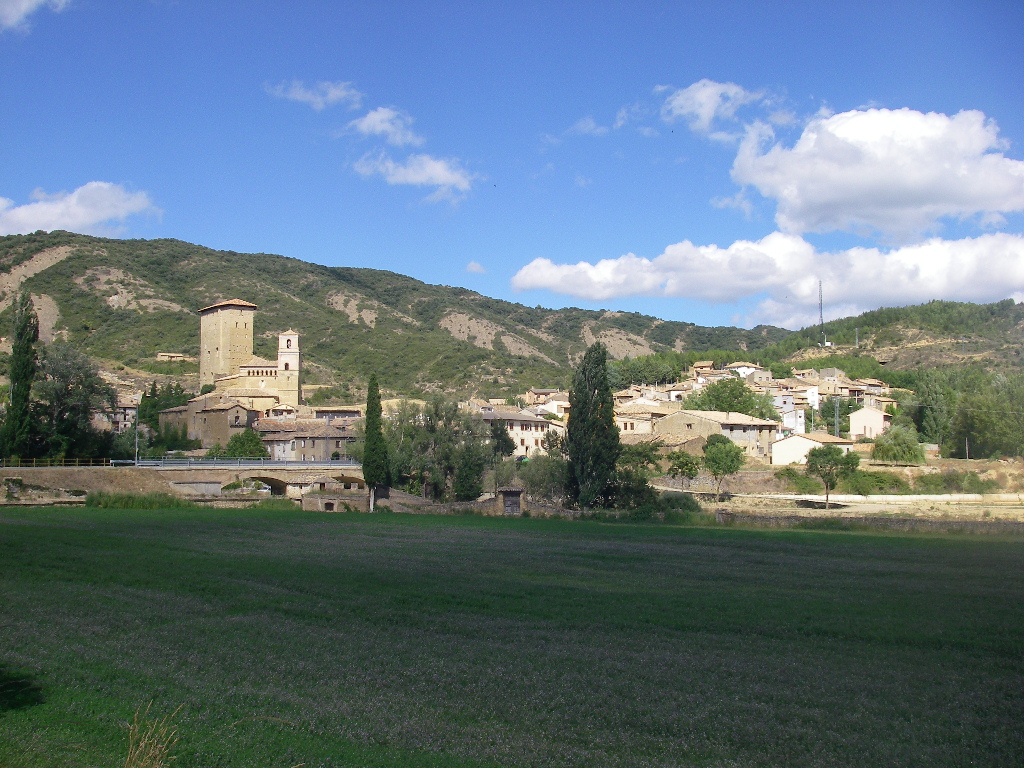

- Coat of arms

- Location within Aragon Location within Spain Location within Europe
- Coordinates: 42°23′13″N 0°56′09″W
- Country: Spain
- Autonomous community: Aragon
- Province: Zaragoza

Population (2025-01-01)
  - Total: 166
- Time zone: UTC+1 (CET)
  - Summer (DST): UTC+2 (CEST)

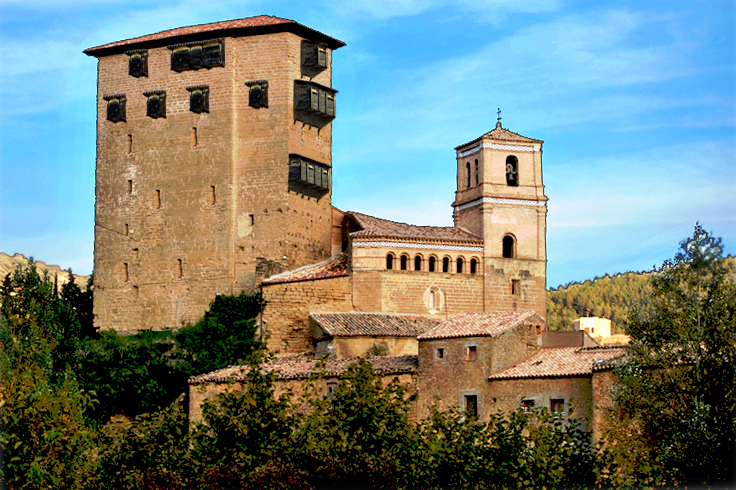
Castle of Biel: Hypothetical virtual reconstruction of the hoardings.

Biel is a municipality (pop. 186) in the Spanish province of Zaragoza, in the autonomous community of Aragon. Biel included the village or "Lower Local Entity" ("Entidad Local Menor") of Fuencalderas.

Historically, a Jewish community was present in Biel from the 13th century to the expulsion of the Jews in 1492.
