= Sos del Rey Católico =

Sos del Rey Católico (Spanish) Sos d'o Rei Catolico (Aragonese)
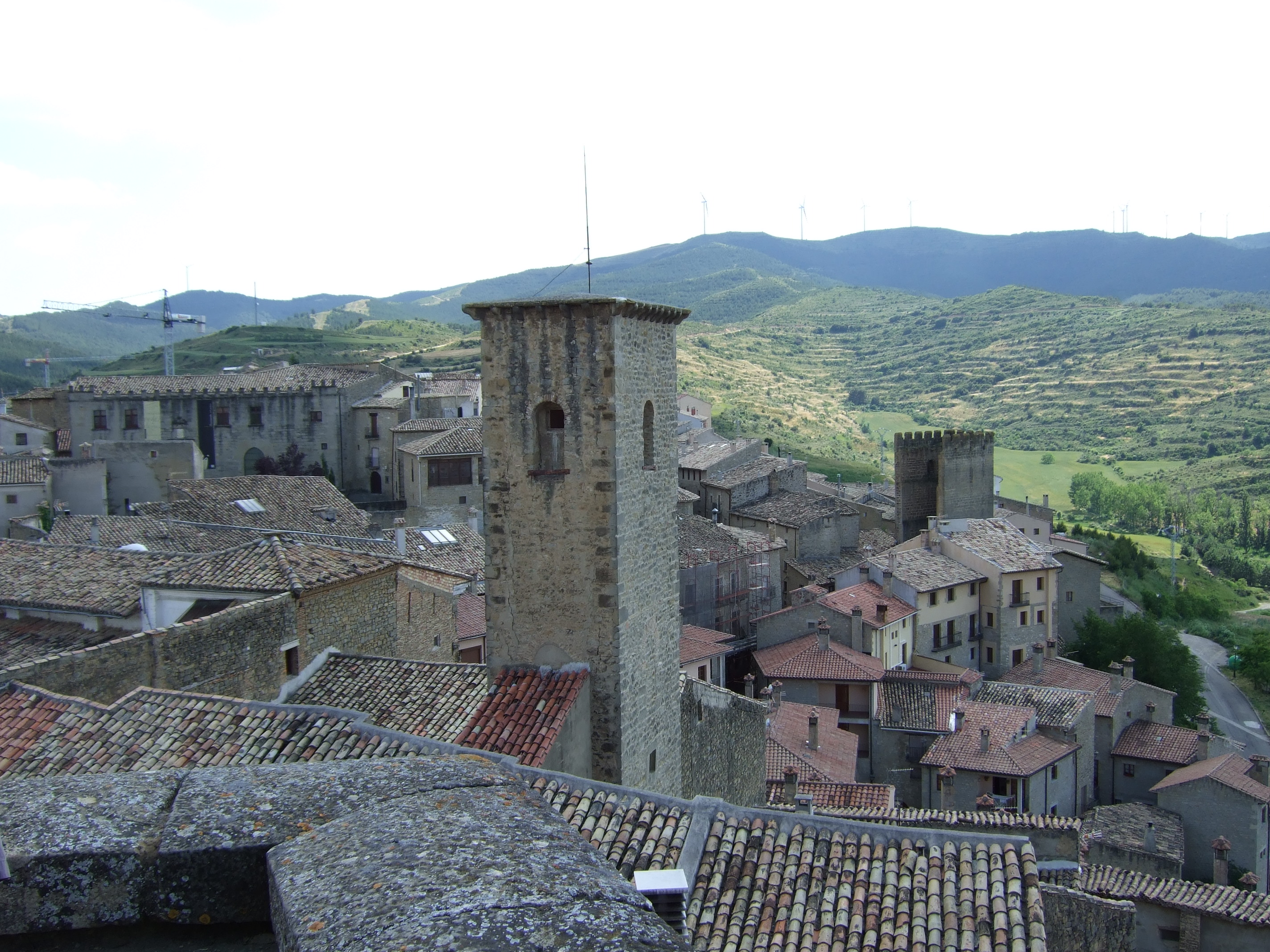

- Coat of arms

- Location in Spain.
- Coordinates: 42°29′48″N 1°12′53″W
- Country: Spain
- Autonomous community: Aragon
- Province: Zaragoza
- Comarca: Cinco Villas
- Municipality: Sos del Rey Católico
- Founded: 907

Government
  - Mayor: Jesús Iso

Area
  - Total: 216.62 km^{2} (83.64 sq mi)
- Elevation: 652 m (2,139 ft)

Population (2025-01-01)
  - Total: 582
  - Density: 2.69/km^{2} (6.96/sq mi)
- Demonym: Sosienses
- Time zone: UTC+1 (CET)
  - Summer (DST): UTC+2 (CEST)
- Postal Code: 50680

Spanish Cultural Heritage
- Type: Non-movable
- Criteria: Historic ensemble
- Designated: 6 June 1968
- Reference no.: RI-53-0000096

Sos del Rey Católico (in Aragonese: Sos d'o Rei Catolico) is a historic town and municipality in the Cinco Villas comarca, province of Zaragoza, in Aragon, Spain.

== History ==
Located on rocky and elevated terrain, this important border town served well as a stronghold from the year 907 when it was reclaimed by Sancho I of Pamplona.

It was incorporated in 1044 by Ramiro I into the Kingdom of Aragon.

In the year 1452, during the Navarrese Civil War, Queen Juana Enríquez de Córdoba moved to the town, then called "Sos". There she gave birth to the infante Ferdinand on March 10, 1452, who later became Ferdinand II of Aragon, one of the Catholic Monarchs. His birth added "del Rey Católico" to the name of the town, which translates as "of the Catholic King".

In 1711 it was named as the capital of the Cinco Villas.

== Main sights ==
The town's preserved historic center features historic city walls, churches, the Plaza de la Villa and the Palacio de los Sada, which was the birthplace of King Ferdinand II in 1452.

- Castillo de Sos de Aragón, in an inside light promontory rise this castle built by Ramiro II of Aragon in the 12th century, with further reforms. Has irregular plant, with a bucket provided with arrow slits and in the center, the most remarkable vestige that has been preserved of the 12th-century castle is the slender tower of homage, a square of 6 m side and topped by battlements, point from which the Pyrenean peaks can be seen, both Huescan as Navarrese. Previously to this it was in the same site a primitive wooden castle which were built around the houses, indeed that was the origin of the town. Of the original wooden castle nothing remains. As construction techniques evolved, the wood was replaced by stone.
- Palacio de los Sada, this palace dates from the late 15th century, in Gothic style, and reformed in 16th and 17th centuries. It was built on the ruins of a castle and belonged to the Sada family from the French Provence. Here it was where Queen Juana Enriquez gave birth to the infante Ferdinand. Its façade has oval doors, coats of arms and shot of battlements. It preserves the courtyard and remains of the walls and a fortified tower. But all interior of this building is new. Today beside the tourist office can find a museum and interpretive center of the monarch.

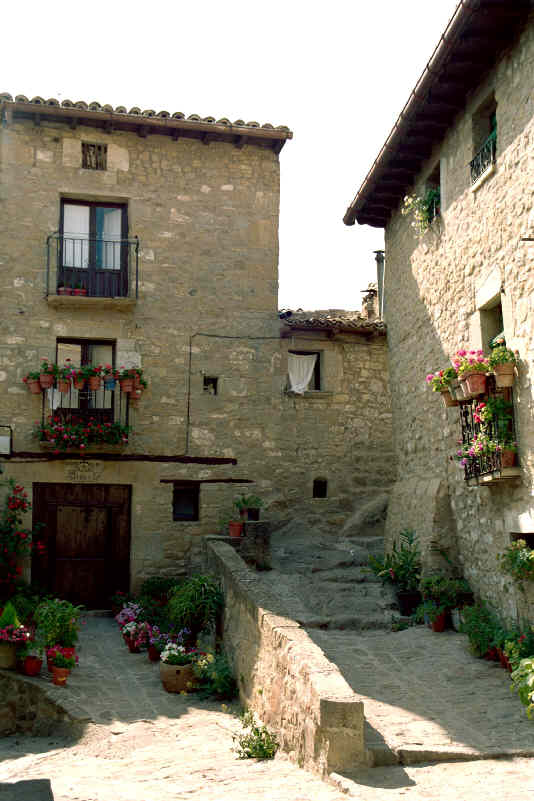
Jewish quarter

- Barrio judío (the Jewish quarter) had great importance during the medieval era, in it lived about 30 families who came to the village in the 12th century and had to migrate to the neighboring Kingdom of Navarre in 1492, date on which the Catholic Monarchs signed the decree expelling the Jews of the kingdom of Castile and Aragon. At the heart of the district is the known as Plaza de la Sartén and where it can see in one of its houses a slot where formerly the Jews placed the Mezuzah, a scroll which has written two verses from the Torah and is usually found in the right of all the Jewish houses. In the Jewish quarter also is located the Old Synagogue, today converted into a farmhouse. It can also see that there is a cross drawn on the walls of some doors, it has been determined that these houses belong to Jews converted to Christianity, to record carved this symbol at the entrance.
- City Walls, The town of Sos is located on a rocky spur and is surrounded by the Gothic walls, which are confused in some parts with buildings. Of which seven city gates are preserved:
- City Gates, the nature of border town between the neighboring kingdoms of Navarre and Aragon, made the medieval town has a defensive wall around the entire perimeter of the town. Are seven tower-shaped city gates of the walls, giving access to the intramural enclosure are preserved today.
1. Portal de Zaragoza, It gives the main access, to Calle Fernando el Católico leading to Plaza de la villa.
2. Portal de la Reina, called with this name, because according to tradition probably entered Queen Juana Enríquez from Navarre. This fortified tower has several loopholes windows and a machicolation and one of the stones of its gateway can see an inscription that made the soldiers of the Napoleonic French troops stationed in the town during the Peninsular War, which says "Merde pour les volantiers de Mina" that can be translated into English would mean "Shit to the volunteers of Mina" referring to the Espoz y Mina's Navarrese troops.
3. Portal de Sangüesa.
4. Portal de Jaca.
5. Portal de Uncastillo.
6. Portal de Bueno, this preserve only the arch with keystones..
7. Portal de El Mudo, of pointed arch.
- Plaza de la Villa (square and Medieval market), one of the Sos's most important places. On the one hand it find a portico where the weekly market was held during the Middle Ages and where stands a triangular hollow popularly known as "el quesito" in this site the market's officer or almutafaz placed the "romana", a scale for weighing products and thus prevent merchants deceive buyers. Right next to the triangle the "barra jaquesa" was placed, a measure of length used in this part of Aragon, exactly 772 millimeters and that all merchants could use to verify the length of fabrics, yarns or textiles they bought.

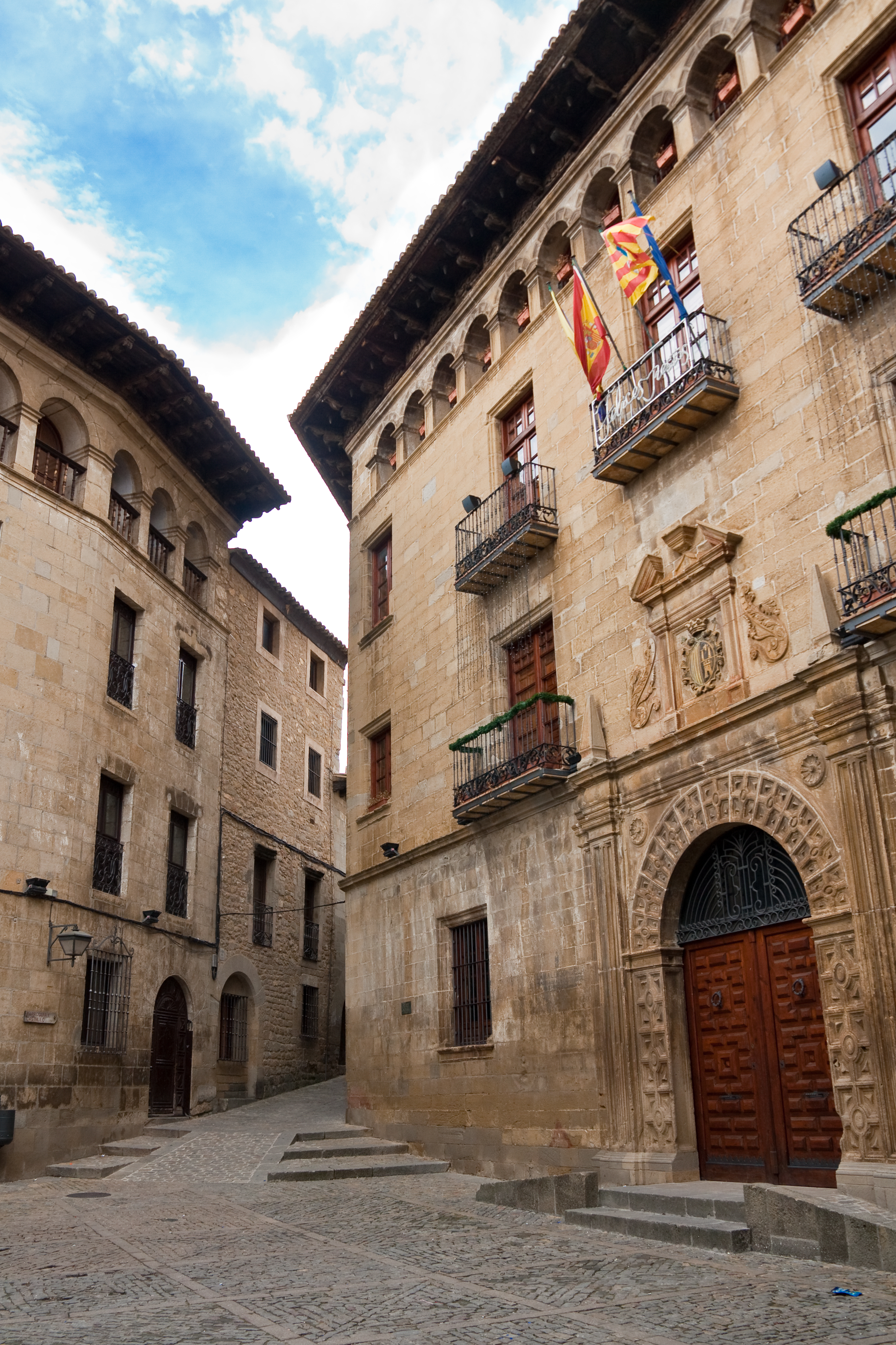
Casa de la Villa

- Casa de la Villa, (town hall), a Renaissance building from the late 16th century, renovated in the 19th century, and restored to adapt to its current role as administrative headquarters of the municipal offices, in the 1980s. in which highlights the town's coat of arms located on the front door and an inscription, of year 1681, on the right side of it where it can read "Dice Dios nuestro señor, en la casa del que jura no faltará desventura" (says God our Lord, in the house of who oath will not lack misfortune). The city hall has four floors, the main is believed to have been destined for the horses and local prison and the other three for administrative and justice functions. The courtyard has a special floor made up of a mosaic of pebbles, characteristic of the nobility constructions. The third floor has a gallery of small arches, typical of the Aragonese palaces.
- Colegio Isidoro Gil de Jaz, it can not visit as it is still in operation. Architect Don Isidoro Gil de Jaz was one of the ministers of King Charles III. During his childhood his family moved to the town of Sos, so it was here that his initial training began. For this reason, he always had a very special relationship with the municipality, in the mid-18th century he encouraged the creation of the Pious Schools for the children of Sos, on the site of the architect's house, expanding the space with some adjoining houses. Currently the building still houses the public school of the town for cycles for nursery and primary education, the Nature and Mentor classrooms. The building is located in Plaza de la Villa. The set includes the iglesia de San José de Calasanz.
- Loncha Medieval, is located next to the City Hall, it was built around the 15th century to house the large market and as a meeting place of the council of the town. Are still preserved the underground cistern, two water wells that were used as refrigerators and some crevices where the wine and oil jars were placed. Until a few years ago, in this recent was held one of the most important cultural fiestas of Aragon, the Festival Luna Lunera ended due to financial problems. Today houses the municipal library in the main building.
- Iglesia de San Esteban, this Romanesque church was started to build in the 13th century. It is in top of the town and attached to a tower. The tunnel that connects the crypt with the church, built in the 11th century and used as a burial site, which can be seen about 22 sepulchers are marked with a cross. It can access the church for the 12th century great Romanesque portal which features a Pantocrator surrounded by the four evangelists represented as Tetramorph. In the interior highlights the 8th century baptismal font, the Romanesque christ Cristo del Perdón which according to a church legend helped a woman to forgive the murderer of her son, and the recently restored Rococo organ. Inside it is strictly forbidden to take pictures.

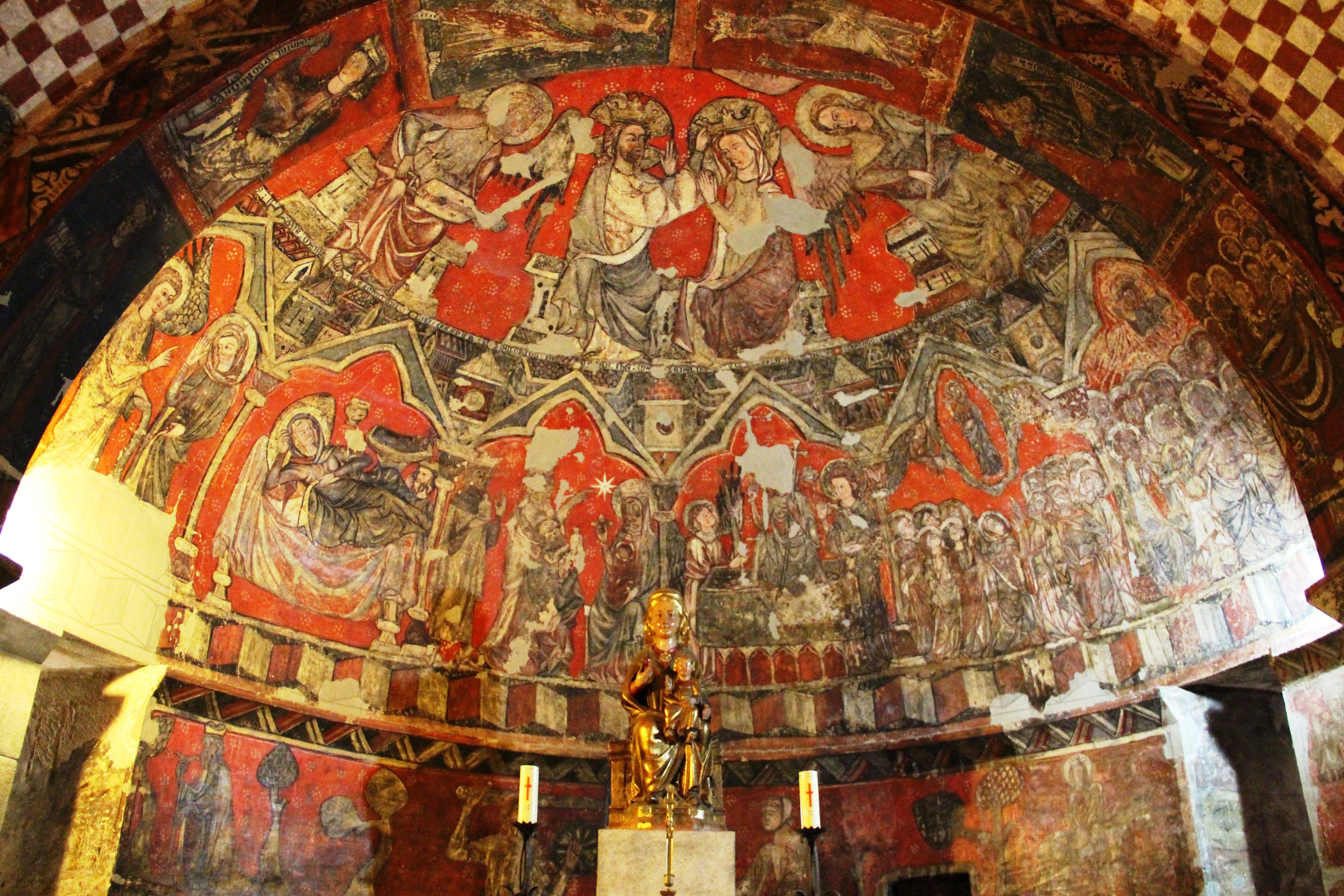
Crypt of Santa María del Perdón, whose construction began in the mid-11th century. Detail of Gothic mural paintings that preserve.

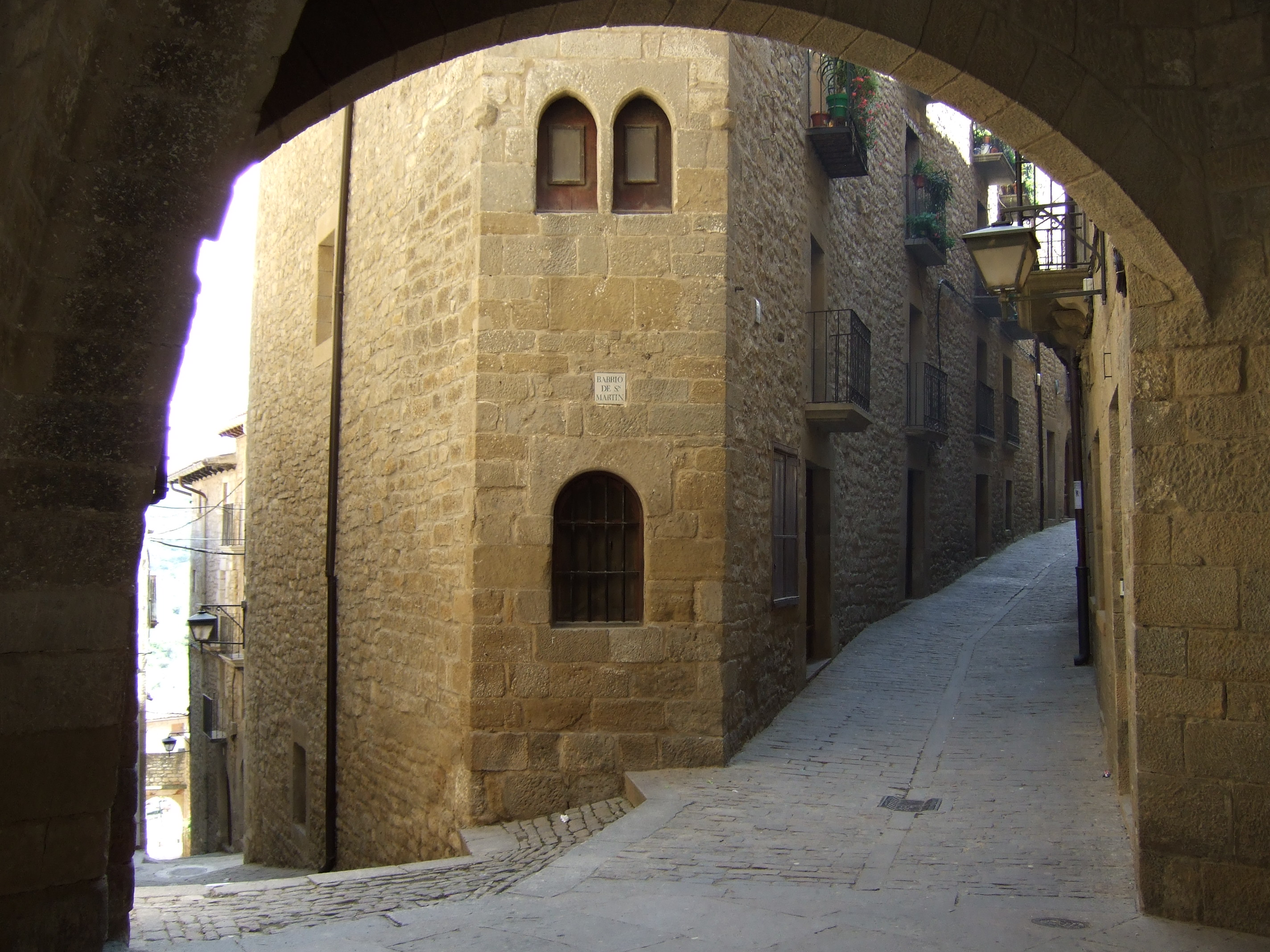
Street in Sos.

- Crypt of Santa María del Perdón, built in 1056 with donations of the Navarrese Queen Stephanie, Queen of Navarre. It has three small chapels decorated with frescoes depicting the life of Christ but are in very bad condition, in the crypt are two capitals made by Master Esteban, one of the architects of the Cathedral of Santiago de Compostela. Also inside is the 12th century virgin Virgen del Perdón.
- Iglesia de San Martín de Tours, it was the chapel of the primitive castle on that settled the Palacio de los Sada. Of Proto-Gothic style, built in the 13th century, consists of a rectangular nave and apse, wooden roof over pointed arches and preserves Gothic murals in the apse.
- Palacio Español de Niño, this building is in Renaissance style and was built as the nobility palace of the Español de niño of the late 16th century.
- The Parador.
- Ermita de Santa Lucía, it is a small church located outside the city walls. Built in the late-12th century or early-13th century. The facade of the church is simple. Originally, it was consecrated to Saint Michael, whom he referred to by the Gothic mural paintings preserved in the apse. Currently, the hermitage is visited on the Saint Lucia's day (December 13), before or after the offices held there.
- Palacio del Consistorio, an example of 16th-century Aragonese civil architecture.
- Historic center, all the historic center is well preserved and the town is declared Historic-Artistic grouping and Bien de Interés Cultural in the year 1968.
- Monasterio e iglesia de Valentuñana, built by the Discalced Carmelites at the end of the 17th century, is located about 2 kilometers from the town. It store a collection of overseas's pieces from the missions of Augustinians.

== Other places of interest ==
In 2009, on the occasion of the 25th anniversary of La Vaquilla film in the town, a set of sculptures were placed, made in bronze by sculptor José Luis Fernández. The sculptures represent life-size chair commonly used by film directors, and also one sculpture of the director.

== Infrastructure and public services ==
- Mentor Classroom, located in the Colegio Isidoro Gil de Jazbuilding, the Aula Mentor offers an open training system, flexible, to distance and tutorial support through Internet.
- Library, The Biblioteca municipal Isidoro Gil de Jaz reopened in May 2003 in the building of the Loncha medieval. In addition to own funds, for a few years it is part of the Library Network of Aragon, allowing users in Sos use funds from other libraries in the network for free.
- Music School, since 2002 when teaching music in Sos del Rey Católico recovered, there several steps have been taken in this field, and initiatives and projects that have emerged later, of the hand of the director, Javier Blanco.
- Nature Classroom, The Nature, Arts and Culture Classroom Project is a program of the Department of Education, Culture and Sports of the Government of Aragon. The project aims to promote knowledge of cultural artistic and social natural goods of Aragon, complementing the development of the educational curriculum in the Aragonese school in the levels of non-university education. For one week, students of schools of Aragon, accompanied by their teachers from the center, perform a full program of activities, which allows them to know the town, and the natural and artistic environment.
- Sports facilities in Sos del Rey Catolico are composed of: Summer municipal pools, with two pools, one for recreational and one for children; a Sports center, It has a multipurpose court for several sports; and a gymnasium.
- A toy library, an educational and meeting space for children.
- The Office Tourism, is located on the Calle del palacio de Sada, which also houses an interpretation center for Ferdinand II of Aragon

=== Other services ===
- Post Office, Guarcia Civil Barracks, bank entities, pharmacy, 24-hour health center, fuel station, Oficina Comarca Agraria (OCA) (Cormarca Agricultural Office), hotels, bars and restaurants.

== Fiestas ==
- Hogueras of San Sebastián (Bonfires of Saint Sebastian), January 19–20. The significance of these fires is in the purification of all evils through fire. Neighbors come together to light the fire in every neighborhood, and during a weekend gather to eat, drink, share and talk around the fire.
- Jornadas Fernandinas, March 4–13, the birth of King Ferdinand II of Aragon is a marked date in the activity of the town of his birth. Around the date of his birth on March 10, a series of events and conferences are organized to commemorate the birth of the most illustrious Sosian.
- Pascua de Valentuñana (Valentuñana's Easter), are the minor fiestas of the town. They held for Pentecost, so the date is unclear, and is based on Easter. Generally it coincides with the end of May, beginning of June. The festivals are held during the weekend, and Monday. There are activities for children, verbena, dancing, musical performances, and a solemn Mass celebrated in the iglesia del Monasterio de Valentuñana both Sunday and Monday, which all the neighbors come in pilgrimage.
- Feria Medieval (Medieval Fair), the first weekend of August, the streets are decorated as in medieval times, offering a medieval market distributed through the streets of the town, where artisans sell products, and offer demonstrations of how to make their products. Jewelry, leather, glass, silver, soaps, food, pastries, sausages, etc. these are some of the products each year returners to the market in the fiesta. In addition to the market, there street entertainment and planned events.
- Fiestas Mayores (The Major Fiestas), third week of August are held. Formerly, these were held to coincide with the day of the Feast of the Cross, on September 14, but moved to August to coincide with the dates of the summer and vacations. The festivities begin on Wednesday with the launch of the Chupinazo from the balcony of City Hall, and for five days, the feast take over the streets of the town. Confinements of heifers, parades, toro de fuego, inflatables, contests, and a big number of events.
- Día de la Cruz (Day of the Cross), September 14. In memory of the Patron Feasts that took place in the town on September 14, a solemn Mass is celebrated in the iglesia de San Esteban with the general bell ringing and then it organizes a popular food, and other leisure-festive events.
- Festival de la Luna Lunera, currently no longer exists.

== In film ==
The film La vaquilla was shot in Sos with many locals working as extras. It was directed by Luis García Berlanga.

== Twin towns – sister cities ==
Town	State/Region	Country
Madrigalejo	Extremadura	Spain

== Notable people ==
- Ferdinand II of Aragon (1452–1516), King of Aragon and Sicily

== Other towns within the municipality ==
- Barués
- Campo Reyal
- Castiello Barués
- Mamillas
- Novellaco
- O Reyal
- Sofuentes

== See also ==
- List of municipalities in Zaragoza

== Bibliography ==
- BAJÉN GARCÍA, LUIS MIGUEL and GROS HERRERO, MARIO. Archivo de la tradición oral. Vol. 1. La tradición oral en las Cinco Villas, Valdonsella y Alta Zaragoza. D.P.Z. Zaragoza, 1994.
- JIMÉNEZ DE ARAGÓN, JUAN JOSÉ. Cancionero aragonés. Canciones de jota Antiguas y populares en Aragón. Tip. La Academia. Zaragoza, 1925.
