= Castejón de Valdejasa =

Municipality in Zaragoza, Aragon, Spain

Castejón de Valdejasa (Spanish) Castellón de Val de Chasa (Aragonese)
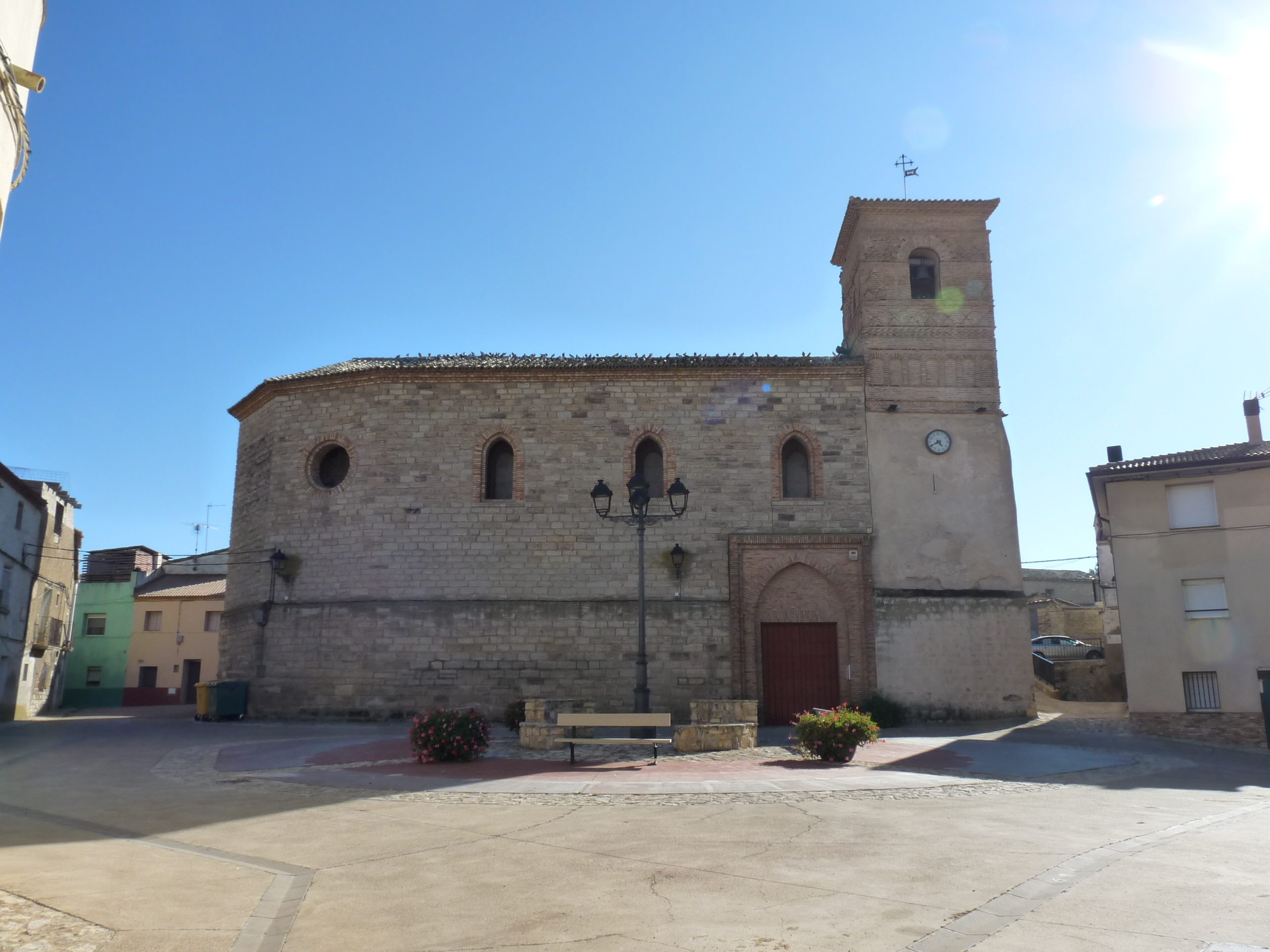
- Iglesia de Santa María la Mayor

- Coat of arms

- Location within Aragon Location within Spain Location within Europe
- Country: Spain
- Autonomous community: Aragon
- Province: Zaragoza
- Comarca: Cinco Villas

Area
  - Total: 110 km^{2} (42 sq mi)
- Elevation: 521 m (1,709 ft)

Population (2025-01-01)
  - Total: 188
  - Density: 1.7/km^{2} (4.4/sq mi)
- Time zone: UTC+1 (CET)
  - Summer (DST): UTC+2 (CEST)

Castejón de Valdejasa (Aragonese: Castellón de Val de Chasa) is a municipality located in the province of Zaragoza, Aragon, Spain. According to the 2004 census (INE), the municipality has a population of 315 inhabitants.

The town is located within the Castejón Mountains.

== See also ==
- List of municipalities in Zaragoza
