= Castejón, Cuenca =

Castejón
- Municipality
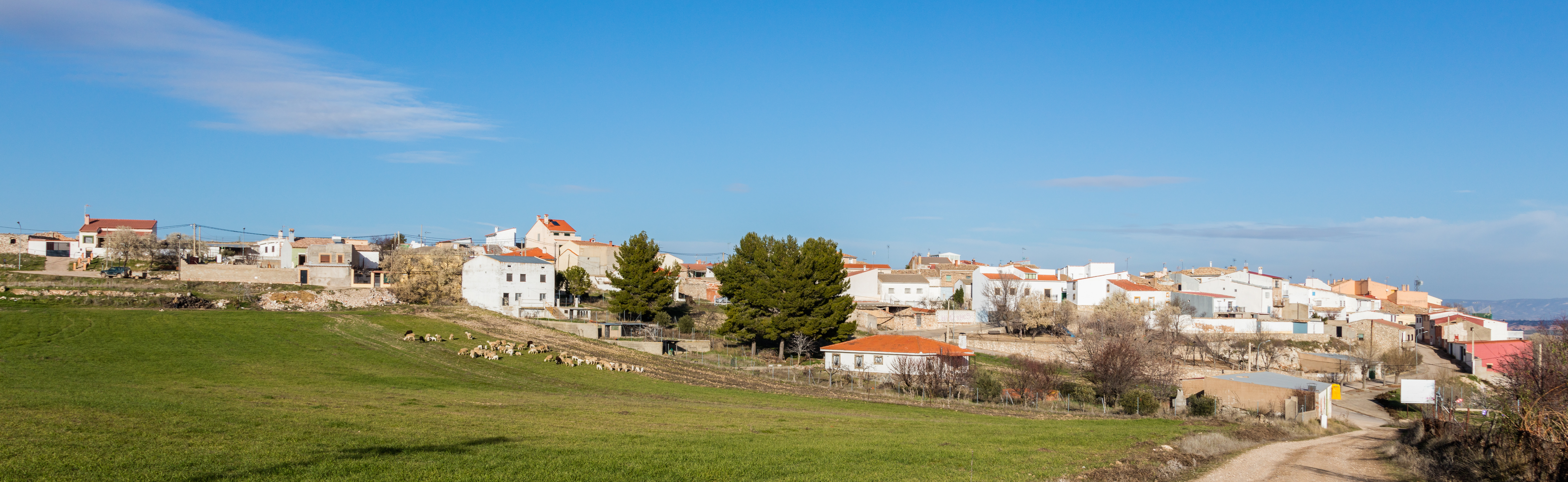

- Flag Coat of arms

- Location in Spain
- Coordinates: 40°22′56″N 2°32′51″W
- Country: Spain
- Autonomous community: Castile-La Mancha
- Province: Cuenca
- Comarca: La Alcarria

Government
  - Alcalde: José Álvaro Martínez Duque (1987) (PP)

Area
  - Total: 4,362 km^{2} (1,684 sq mi)
- Elevation: 910 m (2,990 ft)

Population (2025-01-01)
  - Total: 120
  - Density: 0.028/km^{2} (0.071/sq mi)
- Demonym(s): Castejonero, castejonera
- Time zone: UTC+1 (CET)
  - Summer (DST): UTC+2 (CEST)
- Postal code: 16856

Castejón is a municipality in the province of Cuenca, Castile-La Mancha, Spain. The municipality has 43.62 km^{2} and a population of 158 inhabitants, according to the 2015 census (INE).
