= Pozoantiguo =

Coordinates: 41°36′N 5°26′W

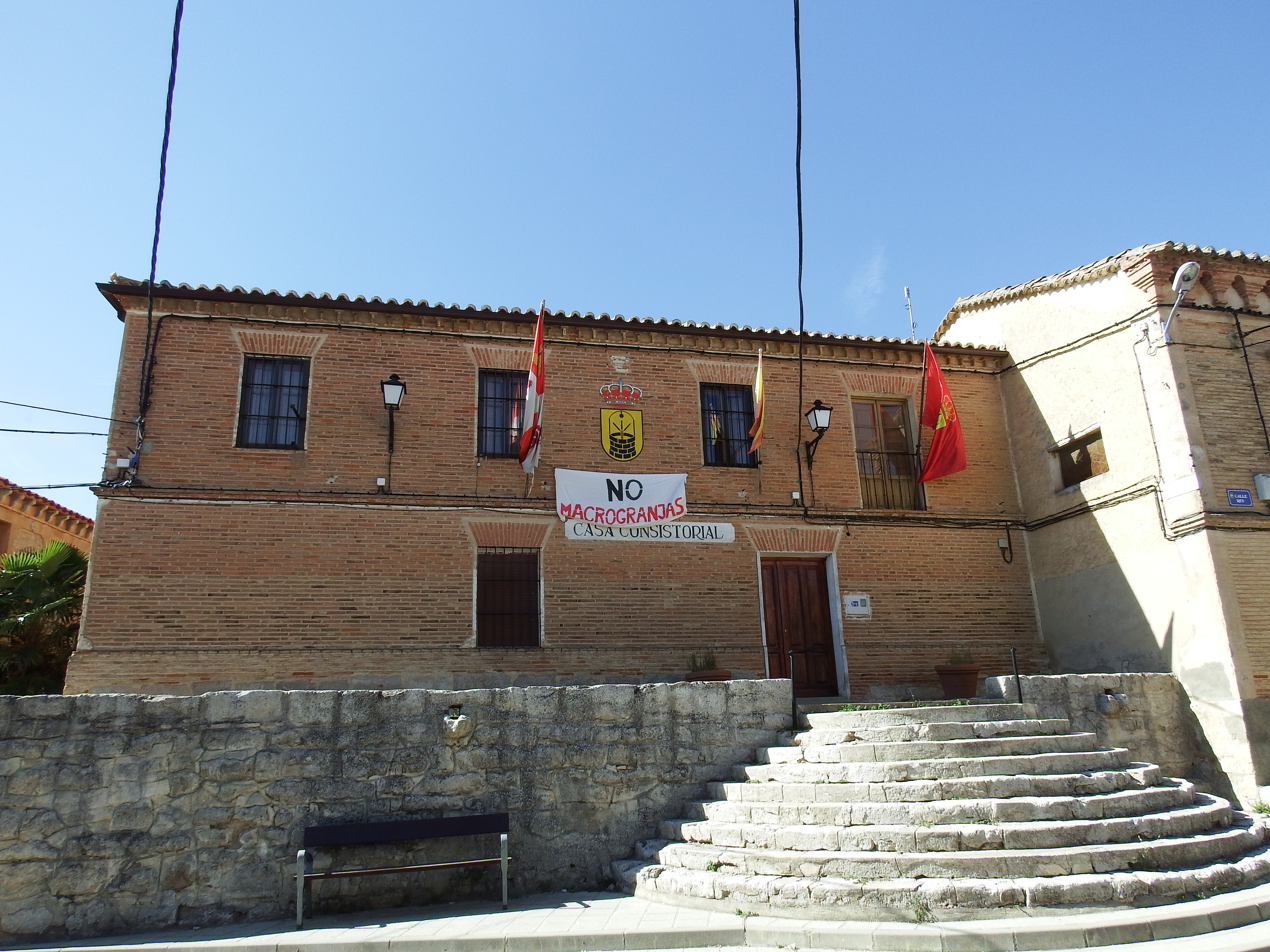

- Flag Coat of arms
- Interactive map of Pozoantiguo
- Country: Spain
- Autonomous community: Castile and León
- Province: Zamora
- Municipality: Pozoantiguo

Area
  - Total: 37 km^{2} (14 sq mi)

Population (2025-01-01)
  - Total: 188
  - Density: 5.1/km^{2} (13/sq mi)
- Time zone: UTC+1 (CET)
  - Summer (DST): UTC+2 (CEST)

Pozoantiguo is a municipality located in the province of Zamora, Castile and León, Spain. According to the 2004 census (INE), the municipality has a population of 306 inhabitants.
