= Castejón Mountains =

Mountain range in Aragon, Spain

- Montes de Castejón
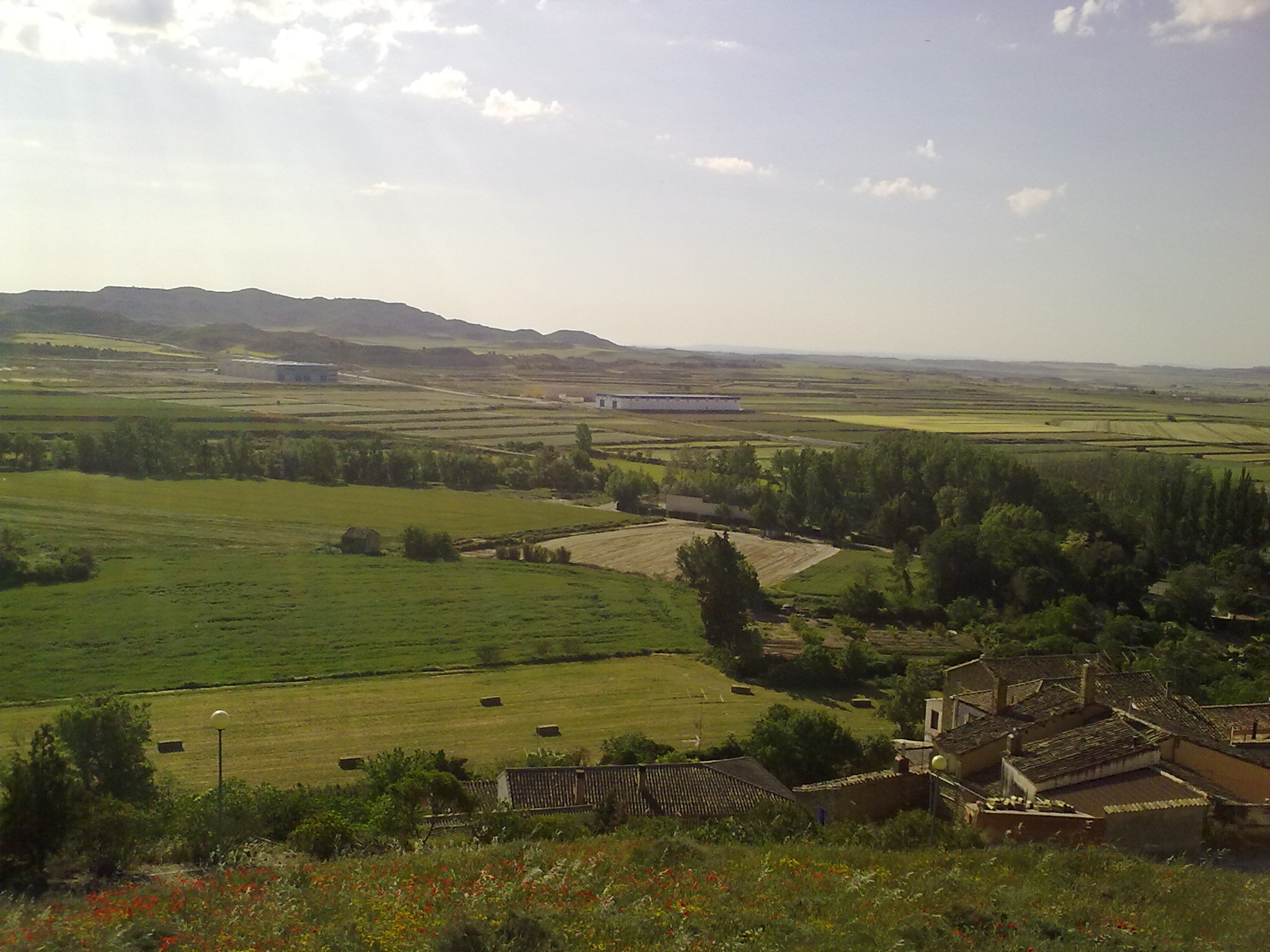
- The NW end of the mountains near Erla

Highest point
- Peak: Esteban
- Elevation: 747
- Listing: List of mountains in Aragon
- Coordinates: 41°56′35″N 00°59′10″W

Dimensions
- Length: 30 km (19 mi) NW/SE
- Width: 10 km (6.2 mi) NE/SW

Geography
- Location within Spain
- Location: Cinco Villas (Aragon)

Geology
- Mountain type(s): Sedimentary rock, Miocene

Climbing
- First ascent: Unknown
- Easiest route: Drive from Castejón de Valdejasa

The Castejón Mountains (Spanish: Montes de Castejón) are a mountain range in the Cinco Villas comarca of Aragon, Spain, located about 30 km (19 mi) to the north of Zaragoza. They are named after the town of Castejón de Valdejasa in the midst of the range.

== Description ==
The Castejón Mountains are covered with low and mostly sparse forest made up mainly Carrasca (Quercus ilex) and pine trees, often subject to wildfires during droughts. The ridge's highest summit is Esteban (747 m). Other important summits are Guarizo (745 m), Pogallinero (639 m), Escalerilla (585 m) and Lomaza (476 m).

The northwestern part of the range is also known as Sierra de Erla, after the town of Erla, located further north, or as Montes de Sora, after the Sora Castle.

There are also wind turbines installed in some of the upper ridges.

== See also ==
- Cinco Villas, Aragon
- List of mountains in Aragon
