= Puendeluna =

Coordinates: 42°09′N 0°45′W

Puendeluna (Spanish) Puent de Luna (Aragonese)
- municipality
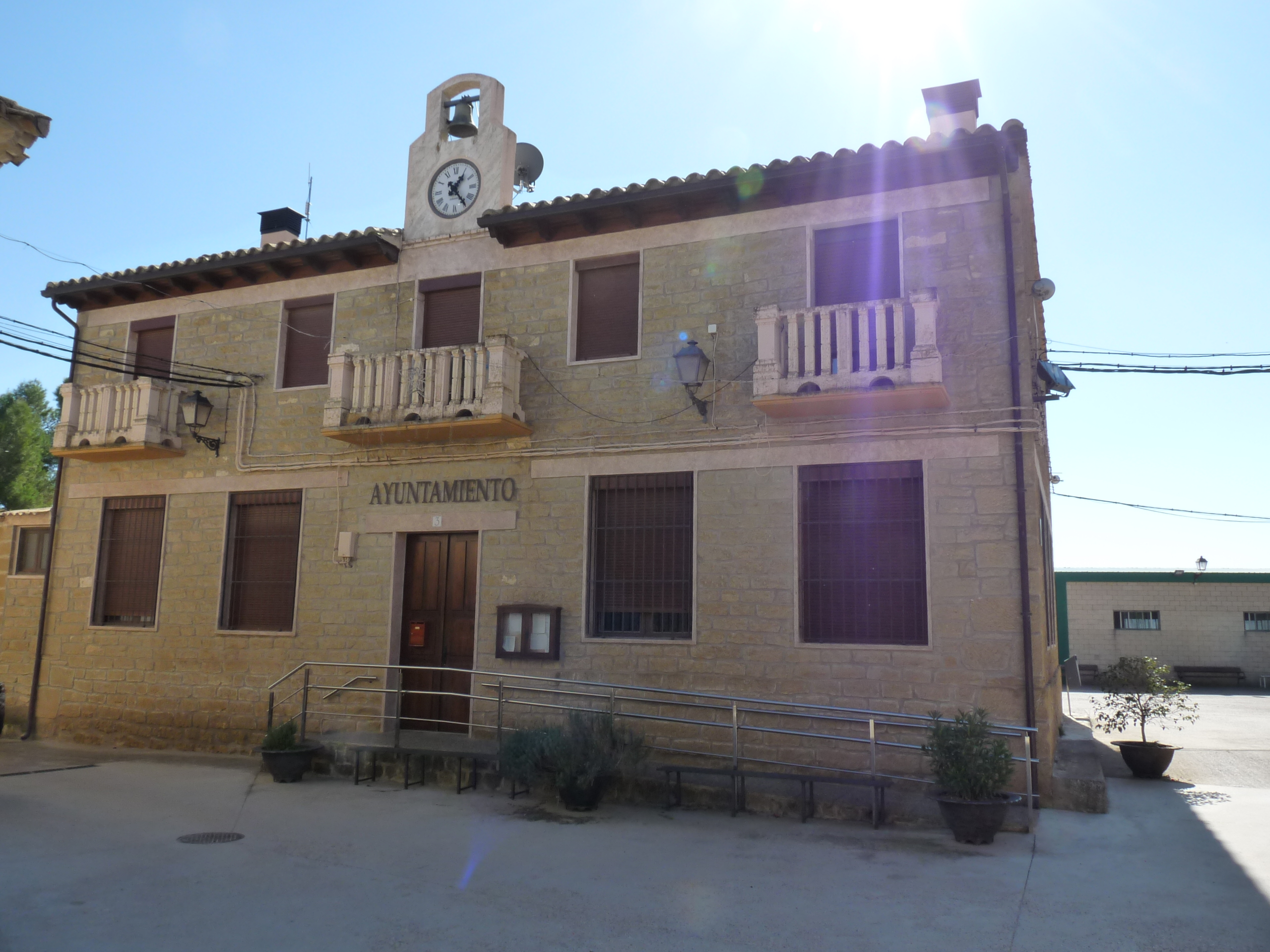
- Town hall

- Flag Coat of arms
- Interactive map of Puendeluna (Spanish)
- Country: Spain
- Autonomous community: Aragon
- Province: Zaragoza

Area
  - Total: 9 km^{2} (3.5 sq mi)

Population (2025-01-01)
  - Total: 42
  - Density: 4.7/km^{2} (12/sq mi)
- Time zone: UTC+1 (CET)
  - Summer (DST): UTC+2 (CEST)

Puendeluna (in Aragonese: Puent de Luna) is a municipality located in the province of Zaragoza, Aragon, Spain.

According to the 2004 census (INE), the municipality has a population of 65 inhabitants.

== See also ==
- List of municipalities in Zaragoza
