= Íñigo López, Lord of Biscay =

Íñigo López (floruit 1040–1076; dead by 1079?) was the first Lord of Biscay. Although the date is not known precisely, Íñigo's government of Biscay began between 1040 and 1043 at the latest. He was appointed by the king, García Sánchez III of Navarre, and did not govern Biscay by hereditary right. At some point during the 1040s he received or inherited the rank of count (comes in Latin). Around the end of his life he began using the style "by the grace of God" (gratia Dei), recorded for the first time written in legal documents after 1072. This style indicated a new claim to govern Biscay through the agency of God (i.e., by right) and not merely at the king's will.

Íñigo's origins are obscure, but he may have been a son of Lope Velázquez de Ayala, a lord in Álava, Cantabria and nearby parts of Biscay. He married Toda Ortiz (Fortúnez), probably a daughter of Fortún Sánchez, the godfather of García Sánchez. His father-in-law and García Sánchez both died in the Battle of Atapuerca in 1054 and Íñigo may have succeeded the former as tenente (lord "holding" the government on behalf of the king) in Nájera. Documents place his rule in Nájera between 1063 and 1075, often through a vicar. Besides Biscay and Nájera, Íñigo also ruled Durango.

In 1051, when García Sánchez granted fueros to Biscay, he officially associated Íñigo with him in the decree, as the head of the local aristocracy (omnes milites), recognising the rights and privileges of the monasteries. Íñigo is further associated with monastic renovation by his making or confirming the donations of the churches (monasteria) of San Juan de Gaztelugatxe, Santa María de Mundaca, and Bermeo to San Juan de la Peña, and of Axpe de Busturia and San Martín de Yurreta to San Millán de la Cogolla. In 1076, after the assassination of Sancho Garcés IV and the division of Navarre by the armies of his cousins, Sancho I of Aragon and Alfonso VI of León and Castile, Íñigo accepted the overlordship of the Leonese-Castilian monarch. In the surviving text of the fuero given to Nájera that year Íñigo's eldest son, Lope, appears swearing fealty to Alfonso, but he is not recorded in documents as count in Biscay until 1079. These dates being the termini ad et post quem of his death. He is last recorded in a donation he made to San Millán on behalf of his late wife. In the donation he names as their children, beside Lope: García, Galindo, Mencía, and Sancho, who died young.

Preceded by Vacant	Lord of Biscay; 1040–1077	Succeeded by Lope Íñiguez
