= Medieval wall of Vitoria-Gasteiz =

Walled enclosure fortified in the Middle Ages in the town of Vitoria

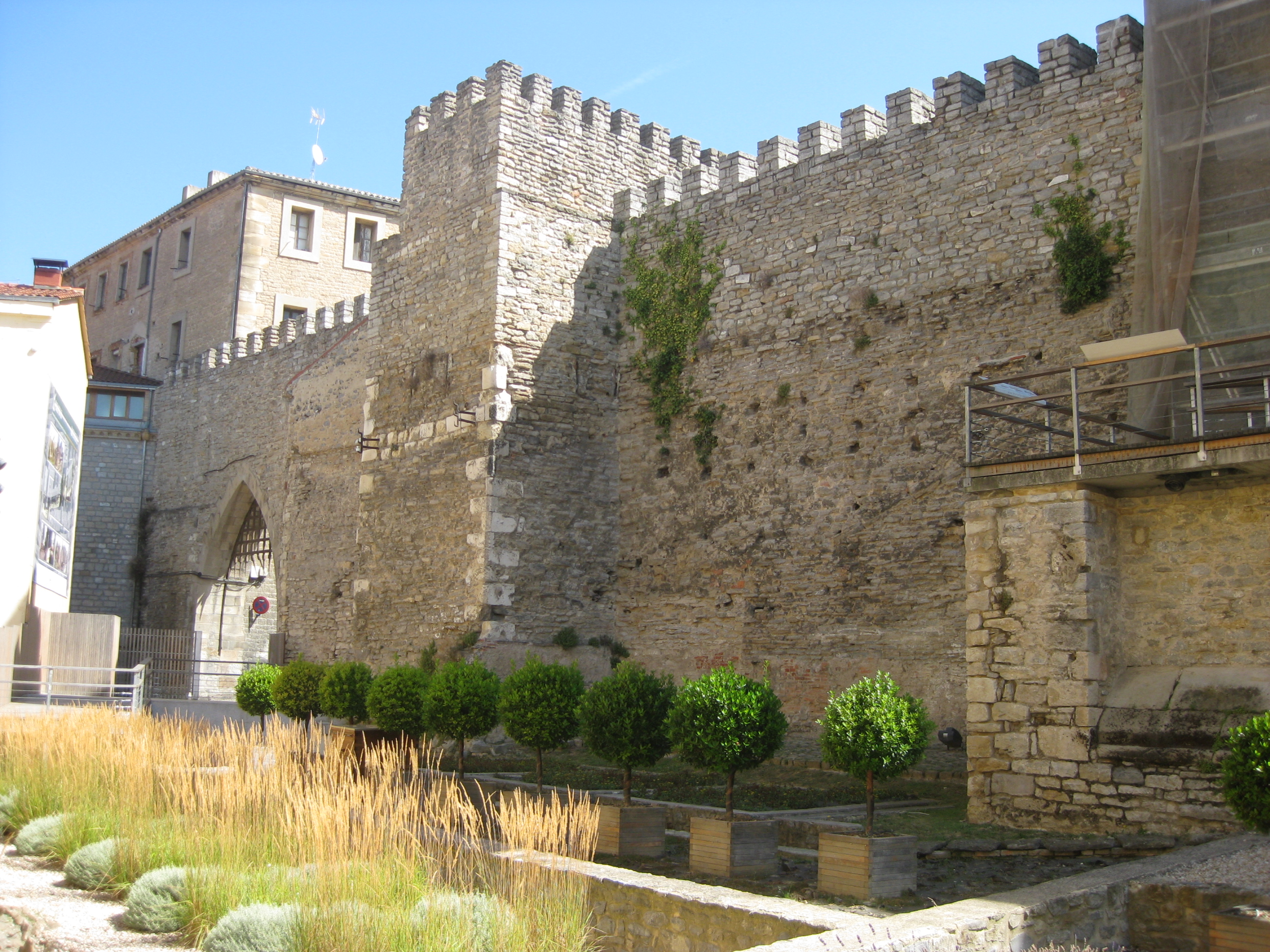
Muralla medieval de Vitoria

The wall of Vitoria was a walled enclosure fortified in the Middle Ages in the town of Vitoria. It was built in the late 11th century. It retains about half of the total volume, and was recovered in the early 21st century in a performance that received the award given by the organization Europa Nostra in 2010.

== History ==
Few places take name and surname as Vitoria-Gasteiz. The walled medieval enclosure of the city was constructed at the end of the 11th century, a century before the foundation of the city for King Sancho IV of Navarre in 1881 under the name of New Victory. By then it was a walled town which represented a defensive outpost of the kingdom of Navarre. The name Vitoria is the village that was located on the hill. Vitoria has historically enjoyed a strategic position because it is on the shortest route between the Castilian plateau and northern Europe. Throughout its history it has always had a strong commercial aspect. Historians have found that in the 13th century three weekly markets were held and after 1399, two annual fairs gathered many visitors. During the last centuries, it remained hidden among the buildings of the old town. In 2001, a team of archaeological researchers from the University of the Basque Country conducted archaeological excavations in the basement of the Cathedral of Santa Maria and the remains of the foundations of the old wall were discovered.

After analyzing the remains it was found that the foundations correspond to the first wall that surrounded the town but were older than the founding of the city. This would denote a certain economic power and social leadership, unknown to this day who could be your drivers or they defended using many resources for this.

== Rehabilitation ==
Though the walled enclosure had a total length of approximately 900 meters and had approximately 22 towers, now only half remains. After the discovery realized in the excavations of the cathedral it was decided to carry out a restoration of the remains of the wall that were remaining in the hillside west.

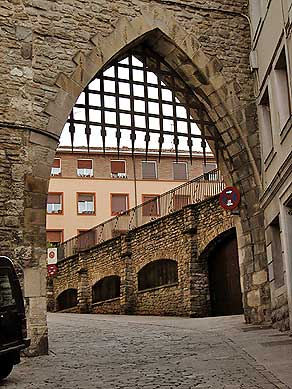
Canton pulmonias

- First stage: in 2006 was uncovered the section that corresponds to the rear of numbers 98 to 104 Street Raid. They were discovered about 136 meters from the ancient walls and remains of slaughterhouse and 19th-century market.
- Second stage: was released in 2010 and offers the chance to see 160 meters in the rear wall of San Miguel through a wooden lattice that mimics the shape of the wall that is not preserved.
- Third stage: is between the first two phases and is still to be adapted.

== Visit the wall ==
Through the Cathedral of Santa Maria Foundation can arrange guided tours that take tourists through the two reclaimed areas. They can be observed from the misguided restorations carried out in the style of the time in the 1960s, through the different construction types, the most modern lattice cedar that recreates the dimensions of the wall at its best.

The itinerary, across a walk landscaped of 3,000 square meters, allows to cross part of the defensive wall and to contemplate from a system of walkways to the 136 meters of wall bounded by two large towers. The wall reaches its highest point at 11 meters and the towers rising up to 15 meters.

The wall is not preserved exactly as it was in the 11th century, because throughout the ages have been adding other elements.

The gateway through which visitors can return to the 11th century runs around the perimeter of the passage round and sound, through a ramp to a lookout placed on the abutment attached to the Palace of Escoriaza Esquivel.
