= Ramón Garcés =

Pamplonan prince, c. 1044–1079

Ramón Garcés (Basque: Raimundo Gartzeitz; died after 1079) was an infante (prince) of the Kingdom of Pamplona. He is best known for assassinating his brother King Sancho IV with the complicity of their sister Ermesinda.

Ramón was born around 1044. He was one of the sons of King García Sánchez III and Queen Estefania. Upon the death of his father in 1054, the throne of Pamplona passed to his brother Sancho IV. Ramón was a constant companion of Sancho and a witness to his royal acts. He became lord of Cameros.

Sancho incurred the displeasure of his nobles, who considered him unjust, and his family eventually turned against him. Ramón and another sibling, Ermesinda, conspired against Sancho in 1076. They invited their brother on a hunt, his favorite pastime. On 4 June, the hunting party reached a rocky outcrop at Peñalén. They stopped and Sancho went to take a view on the precipice overlooking the Aragón, only to be pushed to his death. Ramón and Ermesinda may have been motivated by a desire to take up rule of the kingdom, but the execution of such a plot left them little chance of success. Sancho's kingdom was instead invaded and partitioned by the neighboring kings, their cousins Alfonso VI of León and Sancho I of Aragon.

After the murder, Ramón fled to Zaragoza, where he was given a pension by Ahmad al-Muqtadir, his fallen brother's ardent enemy, as well as houses and lands in the city and countryside of Zaragoza. Ramón probably had a daughter; his heir in 1132 was a granddaughter named Marquesa, who donated her inheritance to Santa María de Zaragoza.
