= Ermesinda Garcés =

Pamplonan princess, c. 1046–1110

Ermesinda Garcés (Basque: Hermesinda or Ermesenda Gartzeitz; died after 1 July 1110) was an infanta (princess) of the Kingdom of Pamplona. She is best known for assassinating her brother King Sancho IV with another brother, Ramón, as an accomplice.

Ermesinda was born around 1046. She was one of the daughters of King García Sánchez III and Queen Estefania. Upon the death of her father in 1054, the throne of Pamplona passed to her brother Sancho IV. From her mother, Ermesinda received as inheritance "Villa Mediana et Matres".

Ermesinda was constantly in the entourage of King Sancho and witnessed his royal acts. The nobility of Pamplona became discontented with Sancho's policies, viewing him as unjust, and eventually his own family turned against him. In 1076, Ermesinda and another brother, Ramón, invited Sancho on a hunt, the king's favorite pastime. On 4 June, the hunting party stopped on a rocky outcrop at Peñalén, overlooking a precipice above the Aragón. Sancho went to enjoy the view, and was pushed off to his death. The siblings may have wished to claim the throne for themselves; if so, the conspiracy had virtually no chance of succeeding, and it was Kings Alfonso VI of León and Sancho I of Aragon who profited, partitioning the Kingdom of Pamplona between themselves.

In the aftermath of the murder, Ermesinda sought refuge at the court of Alfonso, who arranged for her to marry a Pamplonese nobleman, Fortún Sánchez de Yárnoz. She died after 1 July 1110, when she and Fortun gave the village of Yéqueda to the monastery of Leyre. She probably left no children.
