= Stephanie, Queen of Navarre =

Queen consort of Navarre

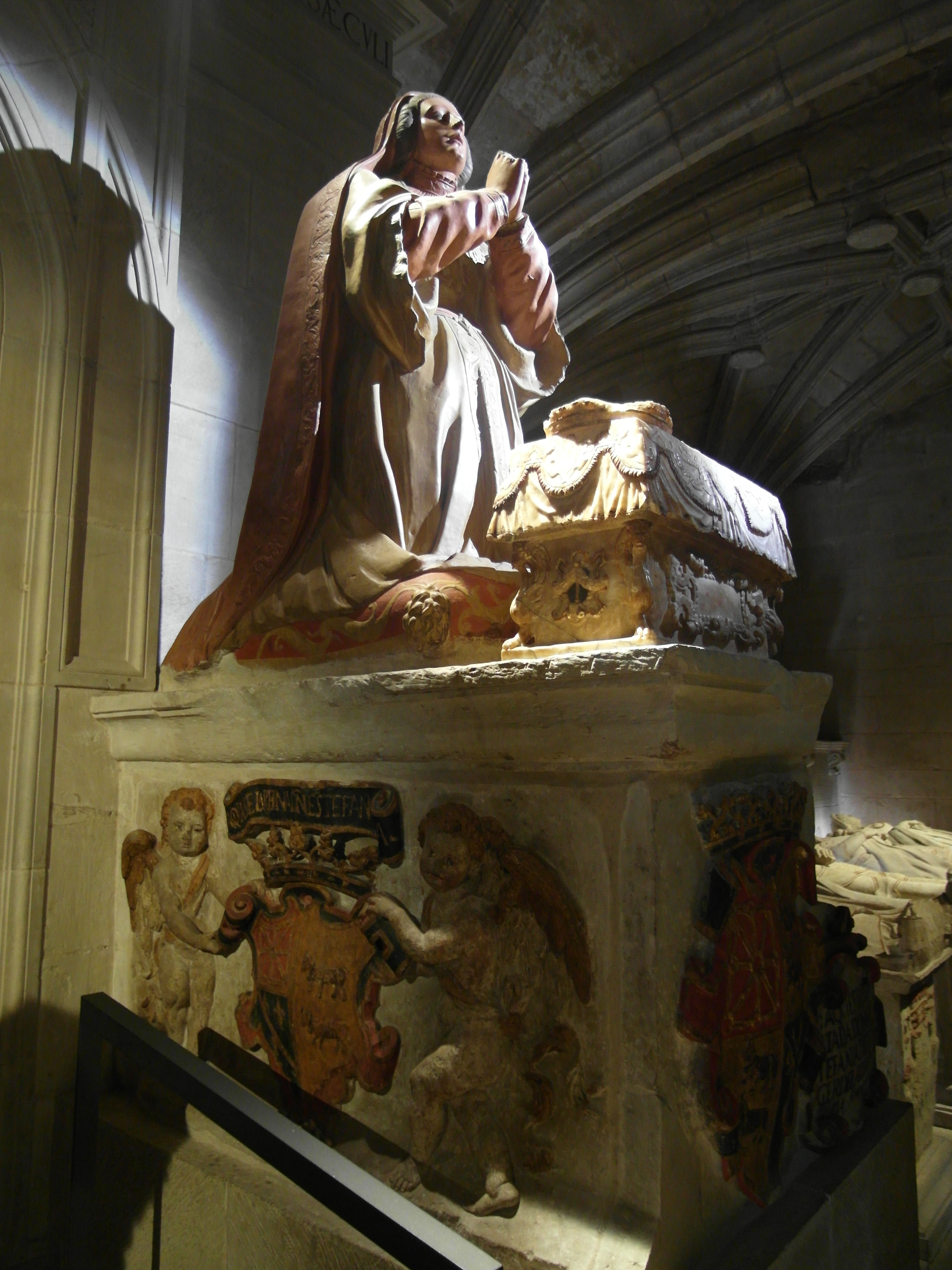
Tomb monument of Stephanie in Santa María la Real, Nájera, La Rioja.

Stephanie or Estefania (died after 1066) was Queen of Navarre as the wife of García Sánchez III of Navarre. Early chroniclers are in conflict over her parentage.

== Origins ==
=== Parentage ===
Stephanie was born at an unknown date, and is first recorded as wife of García in a document dated 1038/40. There are two theories concerning Stephanie's parentage. The first is that she was the daughter of Berenguer Ramon I, Count of Barcelona. Another theory is Stephanie was the daughter of Bernard-Roger, Count of Bigorre and his wife Garsenda.

=== Possible first marriage ===
There are other hints, besides the dubious account of the Chronicle of Saint-Pierre-le-Vif, to an earlier marriage by Stephanie. Histoire Générale de Languedoc, giving no quote or source reference, reports the existence of a 1036 marriage contract attributed to Stephanie. An episode related in the Chronica Naierensis tells that a daughter of queen Stephanie by a prior husband was promised as wife to Sancho II of Castile, but she was abducted and married by an illegitimate son of García. Jaime de Salazar y Acha suggests that this represents the authentic account of the marriage of García's bastard son, Sancho Garcés, Lord of Uncastillo, to his wife Constanza, though traditional accounts give her different parentage. He recognizes the problem with identifying the father with Roger I of Tosny and follows an alternative reconstruction that would make the Iberian crusader a distinct Roger de Tosny, nephew of Roger I.

== Issue ==
Stephanie had the following children by García:

- Sancho IV "El de Peñalén", king of Navarre, married Placencia
- Ramiro (d.1083), lord of Calahorra
- Ferdinand Garcés, lord of Bucesta
- Ramón Garcés "the Fratricide" (Ramón el Fratricida), lord of Murillo and Cameros
- Ermesinda Garcés, married Fortún Sánchez de Yarnoz
- Mayor Garcés
- Urraca Garcés (d.1108), married Castilian count García Ordóñez
- Jimena

She may also have been mother by an earlier marriage, perhaps to Roger Ι of Tosny, of:

- Constanza, wife of Sancho Garcés, Lord of Uncastillo

== Sources ==
- Graham-Leigh, Elaine (2005). The Southern French Nobility and the Albigensian Crusade. The Boydell Press.
- Jackman, Donald C. (2019). Agnes through the Looking Glass, Parts I, II & III. Editions Enplage.
