= Sancho IV of Pamplona =

King of Pamplona from 1054 to 1076

Sancho Garcés IV
- Effigy of Sancho IV on a heavily worn billon obol

King of Pamplona
- Reign: 1054–1076
- Predecessor: García Sánchez III
- Successor: Sancho Ramírez
- Died: 4 June 1076
- Consort: Placencia
- House: Jiménez
- Father: García Sánchez III of Pamplona
- Mother: Stephanie

Sancho Garcés IV (Basque: Antso IV.a Gartzez; c. 1039 – 4 June 1076), nicknamed Sancho of Peñalén (Basque: Antso Peñalengoa, Spanish: Sancho el de Peñalén), was King of Pamplona from 1054 until his death. He was the eldest son of García Sánchez III and his wife, Stephanie, and was crowned king of Pamplona after his father was killed during the Battle of Atapuerca.

== Reign ==
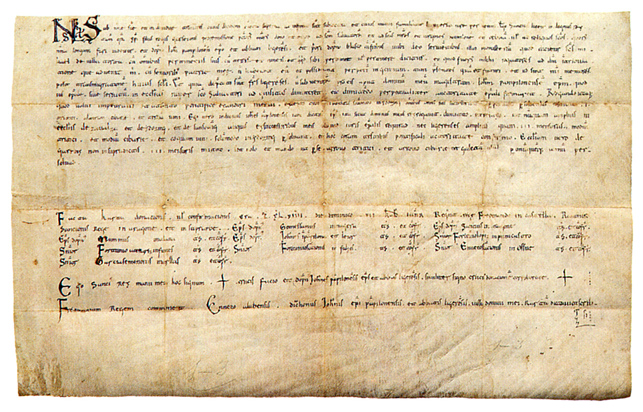
Diploma issued by Sancho IV

Sancho was the eldest son and heir of García Sánchez III and his wife Stephanie. García was killed at the Battle of Atapuerca on 1 September 1054 during a war with the Kingdom of León. Sancho, who was then fourteen years of age, was proclaimed king by the army in the camp by the field of battle with the consent of the king of León, Ferdinand I, also his uncle. Sancho's mother served as his regent until her death on 25 May 1058. Remaining faithful to her husband's policies, she continued to support the monastery of Santa María la Real of Nájera.

Soon after Sancho's accession, many lords in the west of the kingdom went over to the Leonese. Only Íñigo López, lord of Biscay, and Sancho Fortúnez, lord of Pancorbo, remained loyal. On 29 December 1062, Sancho and Ferdinand signed a treaty defining their shared border. Ferdinand was recognised as king of all Castile and Sancho's authority was recognised in the Rioja, Álava, Biscay, and implicitly Guipúzcoa.

As king, Sancho received support from his other uncle, King Ramiro I of Aragon. Out of gratitude for "his friendship, his fidelity, his help and his council", Sancho gave Ramiro possession of Lerda, Undués and the castle of Sangüesa. These places were probably to be held as fiefs or in a similar arrangement. Beginning in 1060, Sancho put pressure on al-Muqtadir, king of Zaragoza, and exacted from him annual payments of tribute, parias.

== War and assassination ==
From 1065, he was in conflict with Castile, raised to a kingdom for Ferdinand's son Sancho II of Castile. This culminated in the so-called War of the Three Sanchos (1067–1068). Years before, Sancho's father had managed to retain a series of frontier lands, including Bureba and Alta Rioja, which had been claimed by Ferdinand. Sancho the Strong sought to reconquer these lands for his kingdom. Faced with an invasion by his cousin Sancho of Castile, Sancho of Pamplona asked for aid from his other cousin, Sancho I of Aragon. Their forces were defeated by Sancho of Castile and his trusted alférez (supreme commander) El Cid. Sancho of Pamplona lost Bureba, Alta Rioja, and Álava to Sancho of Castile.

Sancho IV was assassinated in Peñalén (Funes), whence his nickname, by a conspiracy headed by his brother Ramón and sister Ermesinda. During a scheduled hunt, Sancho was forced from a cliff by his siblings. Upon his assassination, the kingdom was invaded and ultimately partitioned between Sancho of Aragon and Alfonso VI of León and Castile, brother and successor of Sancho II. Alfonso occupied La Rioja and Sancho was proclaimed king in Pamplona.

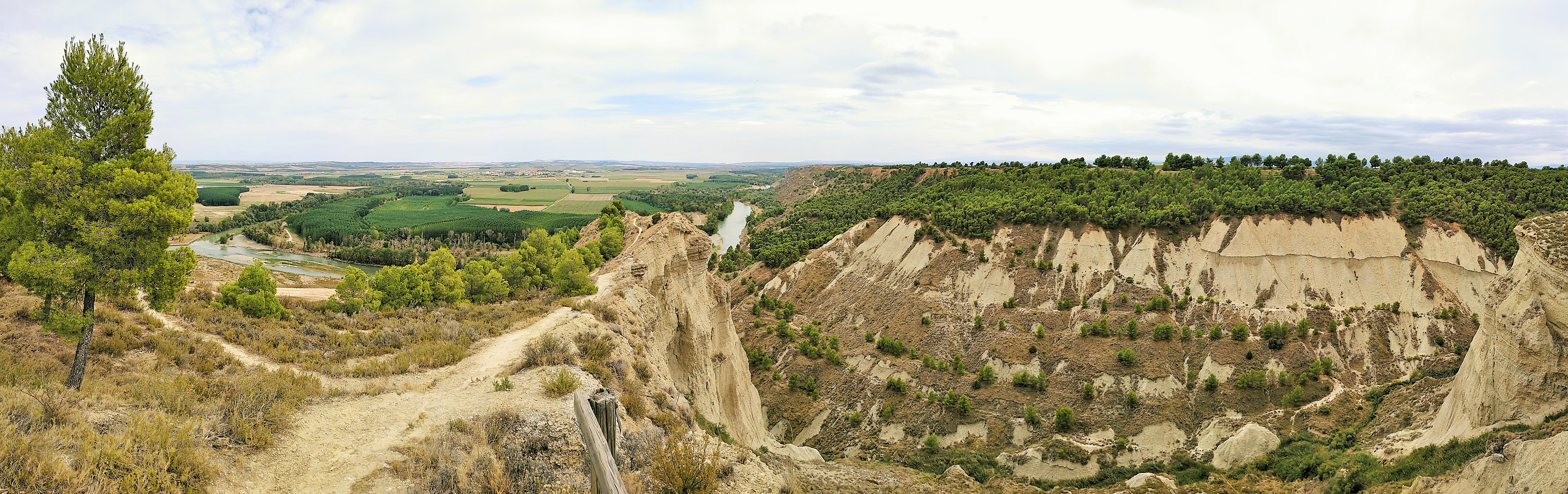
Location of Sancho's assassination in Peñalén, with the confluence of rivers Aragon and Arga on the left far background

== Marriage and family ==
Sancho Garcés IV married a French woman, Placencia, in 1068. with whom he had two children:

- García Sánchez, who was removed from the line of succession by Sancho Ramírez after the death of Sancho Garcés IV in 1076. García Sánchez died in Toledo around the year 1092.
- García Sánchez, with the same name as the eldest son, dead after 1092. His existence is confirmed on a diploma from the Monastery of Valvanera dated in 1092, which states Garsea et alter Garsea, germani, filii Sanchii regis Nagerensis.

Sancho Garcés had a lover named Jimena with whom he had two illegitimate children:

- Raimundo Sánchez, lord of Esquiroz.
- Urraca Sánchez

== Sources ==
- "Sancho IV (king of Navarre)". Encyclopædia Britannica Online. 2010.
- Martín Duque, Ángel J. (2002). "Vasconia en la Alta Edad Media: Somera aproximación histórica". Príncipe de Viana. 63 (227): 871–908.
- Narbaitz, Pierre (2007). Navarra o cuando los vascos tenían reyes. Editorial Txalaparta.
- Reilly, Bernard F. (1995). The Contest of Christian and Muslim Spain 1031–1157. Blackwell Publishing.
- Salas Merino, Vicente (2008). La Genealogía de Los Reyes de España [The Genealogy of the Kings of Spain] (in Spanish) (4th ed.). Madrid: Editorial Visión Libros. ISBN 978-84-9821-767-4.

Preceded by García Sánchez III	King of Pamplona; 1054–1076	Succeeded by Sancho V
