= Placencia (queen) =

Placencia (Latin: Placentia) was the queen consort of Navarre as the wife of King Sancho IV from 1068 until his assassination in 1076. Her family and background are unknown, but the name Placencia (Plaisance) was most common in southern France. Given her lack of known connections, it is unlikely that Sancho reaped much political benefit from the marriage.

Placencia appears in acts alongside her husband. Early in their marriage, king and queen commissioned a silver and ivory reliquary to hold the relics of Saint Aemilian for the saint's monastery at La Cogolla. It was broken up by Napoleonic troops in 1809, but a description by Prudencio de Sandoval, first published in 1601, survives. On the front of the reliquary, the royal couple were depicted kneeling in devotion. The portraits of the royal couple are lost.

Placencia survived her husband and was still living in 1088. An inscription on the reliquary recorded that it was "in memory" (divae memoriae) of the queen, and this was probably added later. She was buried in the monastery of Santa María la Real of Nájera. While Sancho had several illegitimate children before his marriage, he and Placencia had only one known child together, a son named García. He was probably born around 1072.. He was still living in 1095. Another legitimate son named Sancho recorded in a 12th-century source, is probably apocryphal.
