= García Sánchez III of Pamplona =

King of Pamplona from 1034 to 1054

García III Sánchez
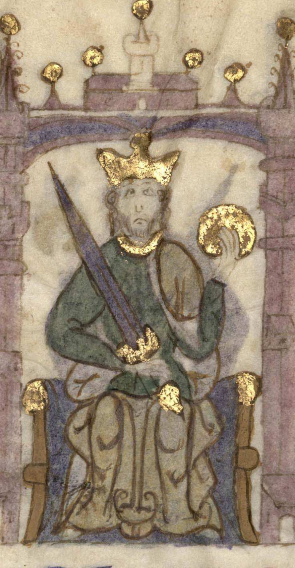
- Late medieval representation of García Sánchez III (Madrid, Biblioteca Nacional de España, MS 7415)

King of Pamplona/Navarre King of the Kingdom of Najera
- Reign: 1035–1054
- Predecessor: Sancho III
- Successor: Sancho IV
- Born: c. 1012; Nájera, Kingdom of Pamplona
- Died: 1 September 1054; Atapuerca, County of Castile
- Burial: Monastery of Santa María la Real of Nájera
- Spouse: Stephanie
- Issue more...: Sancho IV; Ermesinda; Ramiro, Lord of Calahorra; Ramón, Lord of Murillo and Agoncillo; Sancho, Lord of Uncastillo; (ill.)
- House: Jiménez
- Father: Sancho III of Pamplona
- Mother: Muniadona of Castile

García III Sánchez (Basque: Gartzea III.a Sanoitz; c. 1012 – 1 September 1054), nicknamed García from Nájera (Basque: Gartzea Naiarakoa, Spanish: García el de Nájera) was King of Pamplona from 1034 until his death. He was also Count of Álava and had under his personal control part of the County of Castile. As the eldest son of Sancho III he inherited the dynastic rights over the crown of Pamplona, becoming feudal overlord over two of his brothers: Ramiro, who was given lands that would serve as the basis for the Kingdom of Aragón; and Gonzalo, who received the counties of Sobrarbe and Ribagorza. Likewise, he had some claim to suzerainty over his brother Ferdinand, who under their father had served as Count of Castile, nominally subject to the Kingdom of León but brought under the personal control of Sancho III.

== Biography ==
García Sánchez inherited the crown of Pamplona after the death of his father Sancho III in 1035, bypassing the late king's eldest son Ramiro, who was illegitimate. In 1043, he defeated his half-brother in battle, setting the eastern border of the kingdom. García Sánchez III took advantage of the weakened state of the numerous Islamic taifa kingdoms that arose after the dissolution of the Caliphate of Córdoba to push the southern border over their territory, taking the city of Calahorra in 1045. He also inherited from his father the County of Álava and a great part of the County of Castile (La Bureba, Trasmiera, Montes de Oca, the Encartaciones and Las Merindades).

In 1037, he joined his brother Ferdinand, the nominal Count of Castile, in a battle against the Kingdom of León that took place near the river Pisuerga and that came to be known as Battle of Tamarón. Bermudo III, King of León, was defeated and killed in battle, ending a dynasty of monarchs that went back to Peter of Cantabria. Ferdinand would then be crowned King of León. The relationship between the two brothers would however turn sour by the conflictive distribution of the lands of Castile between León and Pamplona, leading to the Battle of Atapuerca, where García Sánchez would perish.

== Marriage and family ==
García Sánchez III married Stephanie of Foix in Barcelona in 1038. Stephanie was the youngest daughter of either Bernard-Roger, Count of Bigorre or Berenguer Ramon I, Count of Barcelona. They had nine children:

- Sancho Garcés, nicknamed Sancho the Noble, who reigned as king of Pamplona from 1054 until his death in 1076 and married a Norman woman named Placencia
- Urraca Garcés, married in 1074 to García Ordóñez, lord of Nájera and Grañón
- Ermesinda Garcés, married to Fortún Sánchez, lord of Yéqueda
- Ramiro Garcés, lord of Calahorra
- Fernando Garcés, lord of Bucesta, Jubera, Lagunilla and Oprela
- Ramón Garcés, lord of Murillo and Agoncillo. Ramón became known as the fratricidal, after he murdered his brother and King Sancho IV. Afterwards he escaped to the Taifa of Zaragoza. In an 1134 charter, Marquesa, wife of Aznar López, referred to her grandfather as "rex Raymundi" (literally 'king' Ramón). However, in medieval Navarre there are examples of the term being used by infantes, so this need not signify he claimed the throne on his brother's death.
- Jimena Garcés, lady of Corcuetos, Hornos de Moncalvillo and Daroca.
- Mayor Garcés, lady of Yanguas.
- Sancha Garcés

García Sánchez had two illegitimate children by unknown women:

- Sancho Garcés, lord of Uncastillo, married to Constanza. His son, Ramiro Sánchez, would be the father of García Ramírez, who became King of Pamplona.
- Mencía Garcés, married to Fortún Ochoiz, lord of Cameros.

== Sources ==
- Jackman, Donald C. (2019). Agnes through the Looking Glass, Parts I, II & III. Editions Enplage.
- Martínez Díez, Gonzalo (2007). Sancho III el Mayor Rey de Pamplona, Rex Ibericus. Madrid.
- Salas Merino, Vicente (2008). La Genealogía de Los Reyes de España [The Genealogy of the Kings of Spain] (in Spanish) (4th ed.). Madrid: Editorial Visión Libros. pp. 216–218. ISBN 978-84-9821-767-4.
- Salazar y Acha, Jaime de (1992). "Reflexiones sobre la posible historicidad de un episodio de la Crónica Najarense". Príncipe de Viana, Anejo 14:537–564.

Preceded by Sancho III as King of Pamplona	King of Navarre; 1035–1054	Succeeded by Sancho IV
