= Gaztelugatxe =

Islet on the coast of Biscay belonging to the municipality of Bermeo, Basque Country

Coordinates: 43.447°N 2.785°W

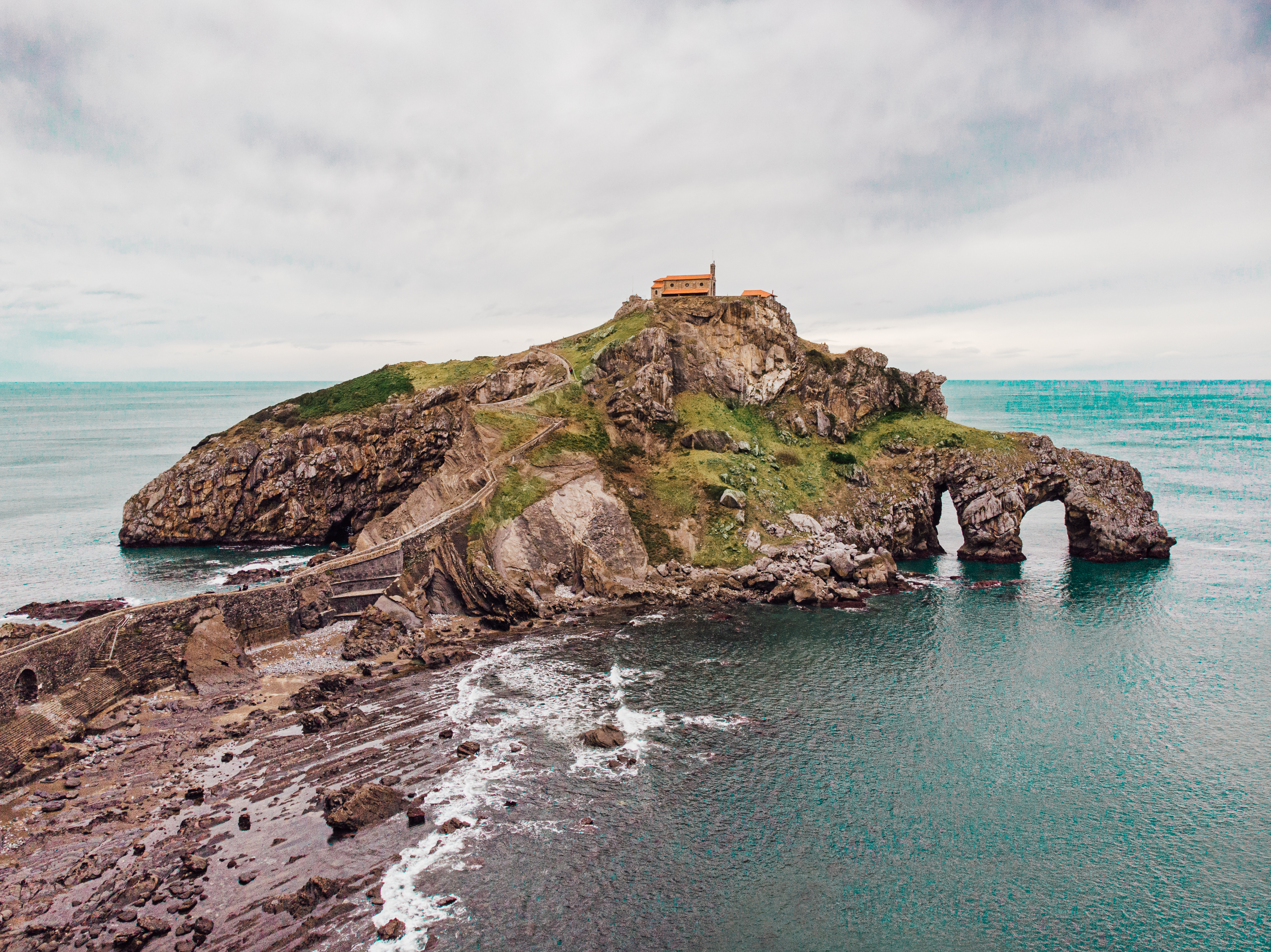
Gaztelugatxe

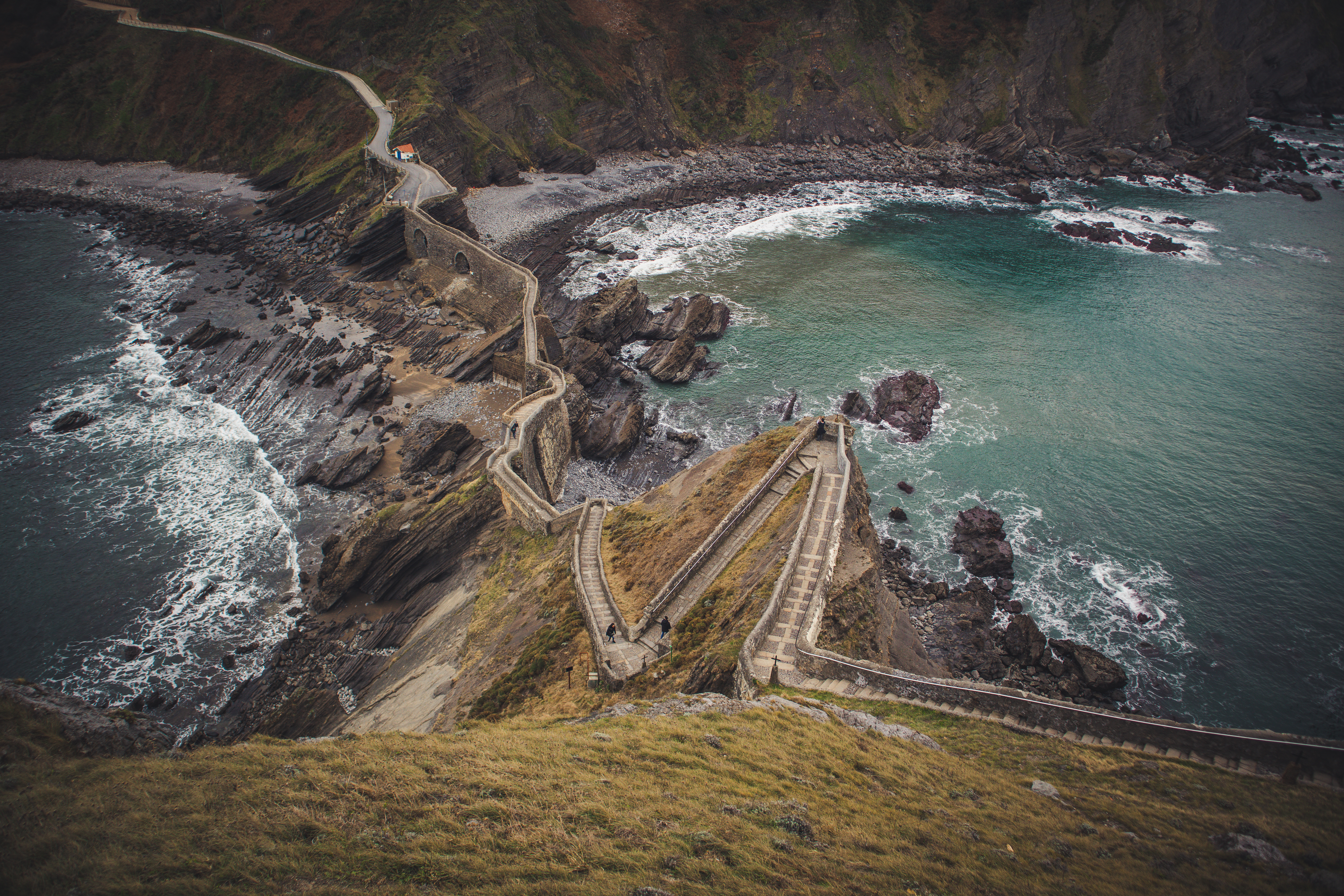
Stairway and path up the crag

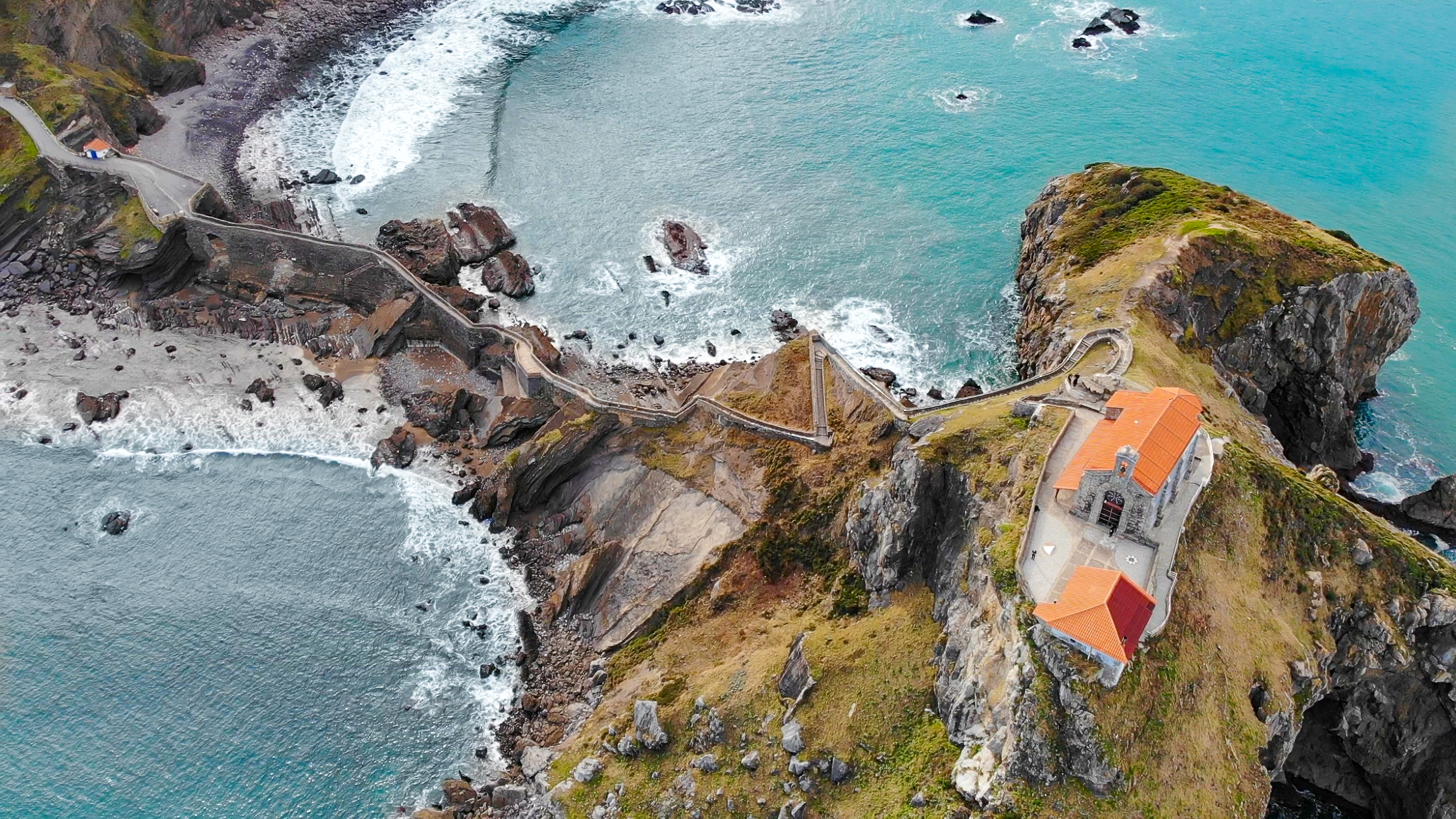
Stairway and path up the crag with drone

Gaztelugatxe is an islet on the coast of the Bay of Biscay belonging to the Biscayan municipality of Bermeo, in the Basque Autonomous Community. It is connected to the mainland by a footbridge.

A hermitage named Gaztelugatxeko Doniene in Basque (or San Juan de Gaztelugatxe in Spanish), dedicated to John the Baptist, is on top of Gaztelugatxe. Discoveries indicate a structure was on the island during the 9th century. The current structure was built in 1980 after the previous structure was destroyed in a fire. The hermitage belongs to the parish of San Pelaio in Bakio.

== Etymology ==
The Basque word gaztelugatxe [ɡas̻teluɡatʃe] may have two complementary meanings, both using gaztelu ["castle"] as main subject, and differing between the suffix -atx (derived from the ancient noun haitz ) ["rock"], forming "the rock castle" (-atx and its derivatives are usual in Basque toponyms related to rocky summits: Aketx, Untzillatx, Atxulo...) in one way, or -gatx ["hard"/"inaccessible"], translated as "inaccessible castle" (referring to the difficulty of its conquest), in the other.

== Ecosystem ==
With another small neighboring island, Aketx, which is a sanctuary for marine birds, Gaztelugatxe forms a protected biotope that extends from the town of Bakio to Cape Matxitxako, on the Bay of Biscay.

The rough sea continuously erodes the rocky coast creating tunnels, arches, and caves.

== Access ==
The hermitage, 80 metres above sea level, is accessed by one of two narrow paths from the parking area, crossing the solid stone bridge, which is protected from the wind, and walking up 241 steps. Visitors can ring the bell three times and make a wish; however, the sound disturbs birds.

The hermitage also houses votive offerings from sailors who survived shipwrecks.

Next to the hermitage, there is a small shelter with sea views that is used for picnicking and for refuge from the wind.

== History ==
Discoveries indicate a structure was on the island during the 9th century.

In 1334, the island was one of the places where the Lord of Biscay, Juan Núñez III de Lara, confronted Alfonso XI, King of Castile.

In 1593, it was attacked and sacked by Francis Drake.

In 1594, it was attacked by the Huguenots of La Rochelle, who threw the caretaker into the sea.

In 1937, during the Spanish Civil War, the Battle of Cape Machichaco took place nearby.

A fire destroyed the church in 1978; it was rebuilt in 1980.

=== Filming location ===
Between July and October 2016, HBO filmed scenes for season 7 of Game of Thrones at the islet. Gaztelugatxe stood in for Dragonstone, with a digitally created castle on top of the islet.

== Gallery ==
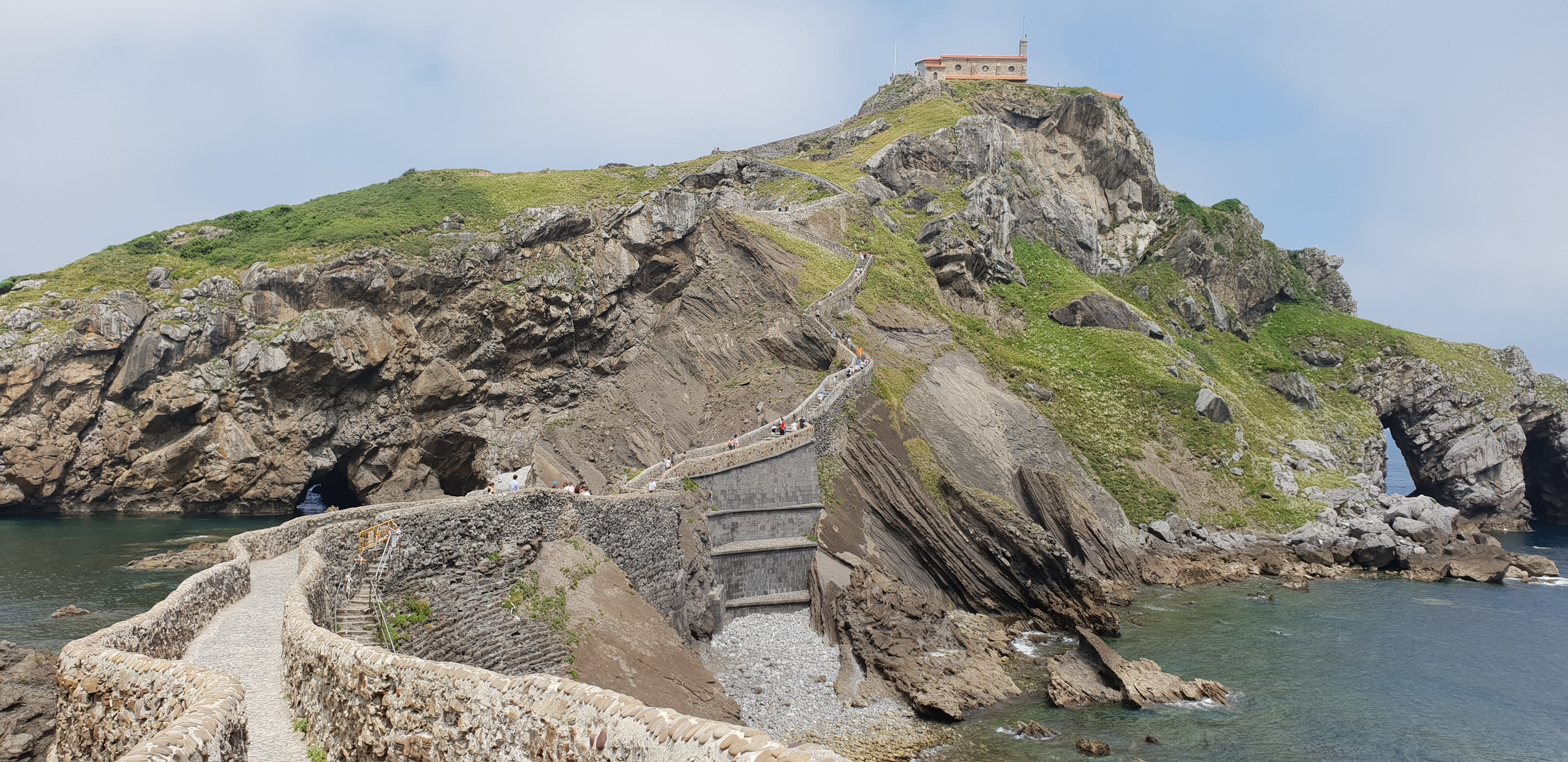

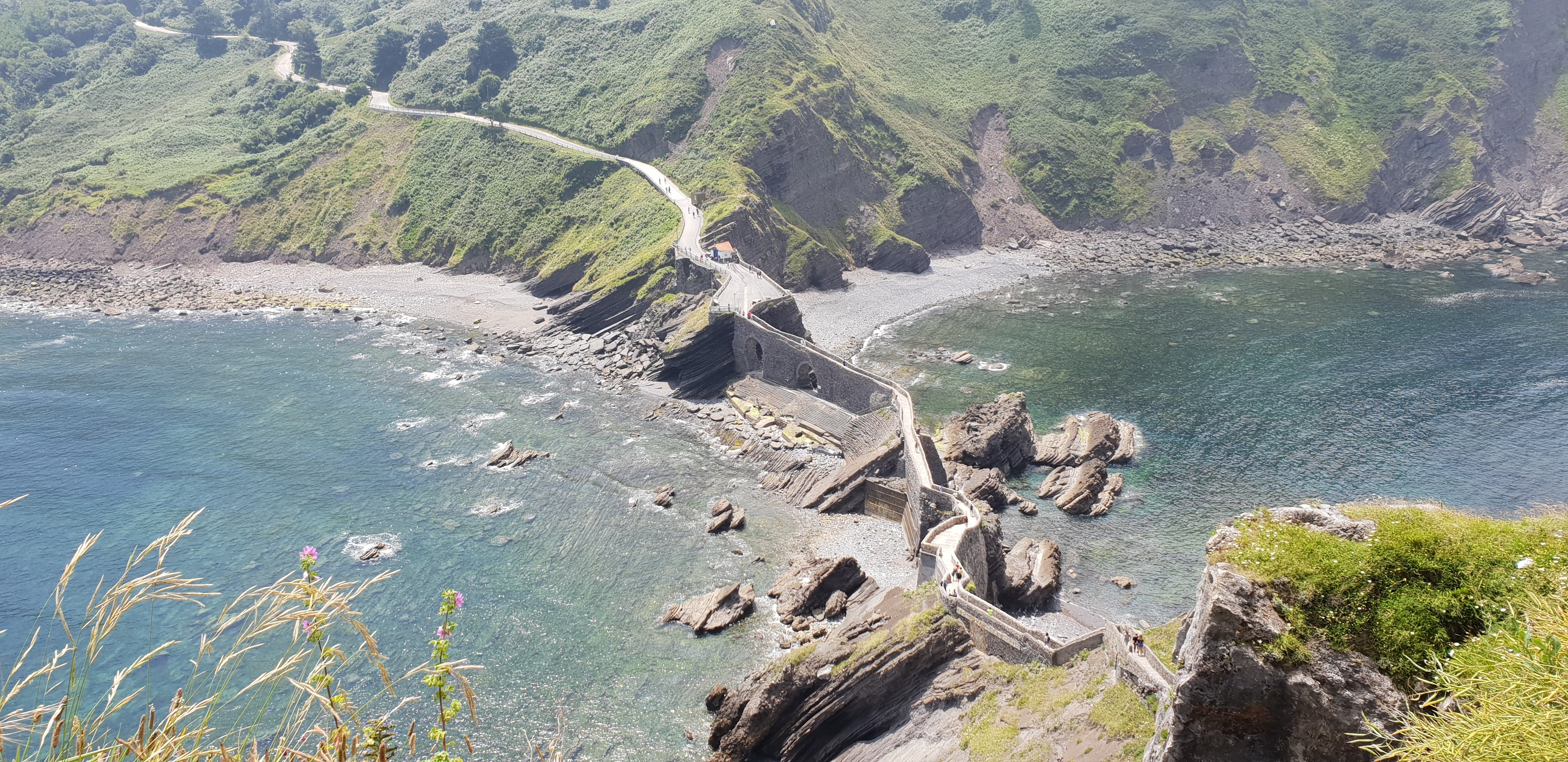

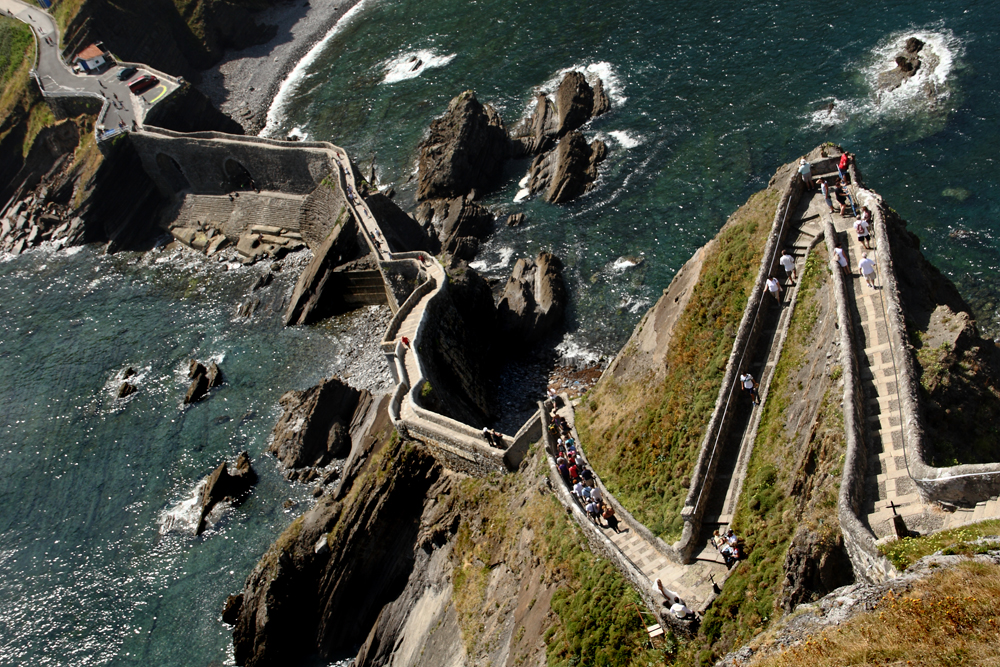

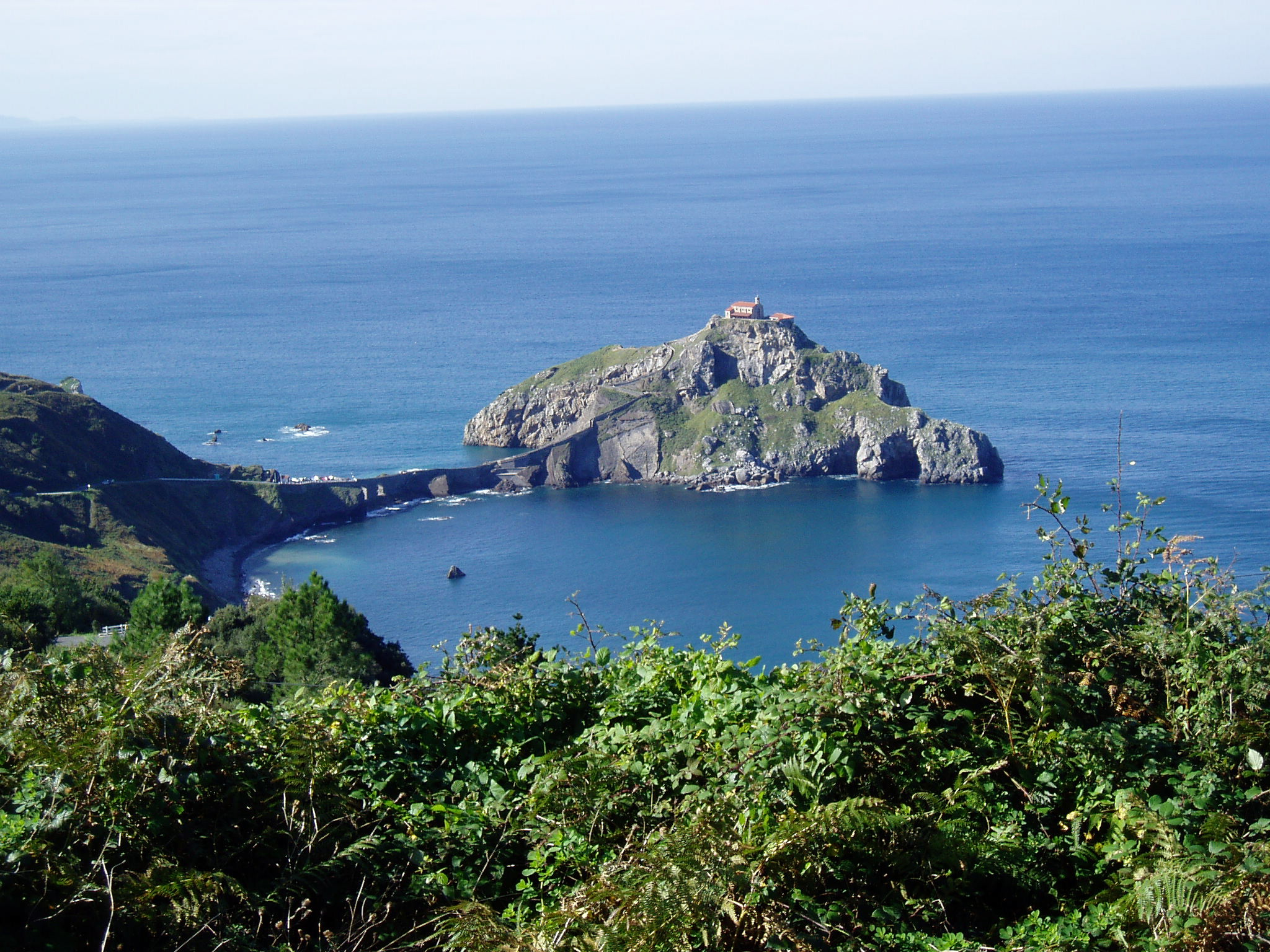

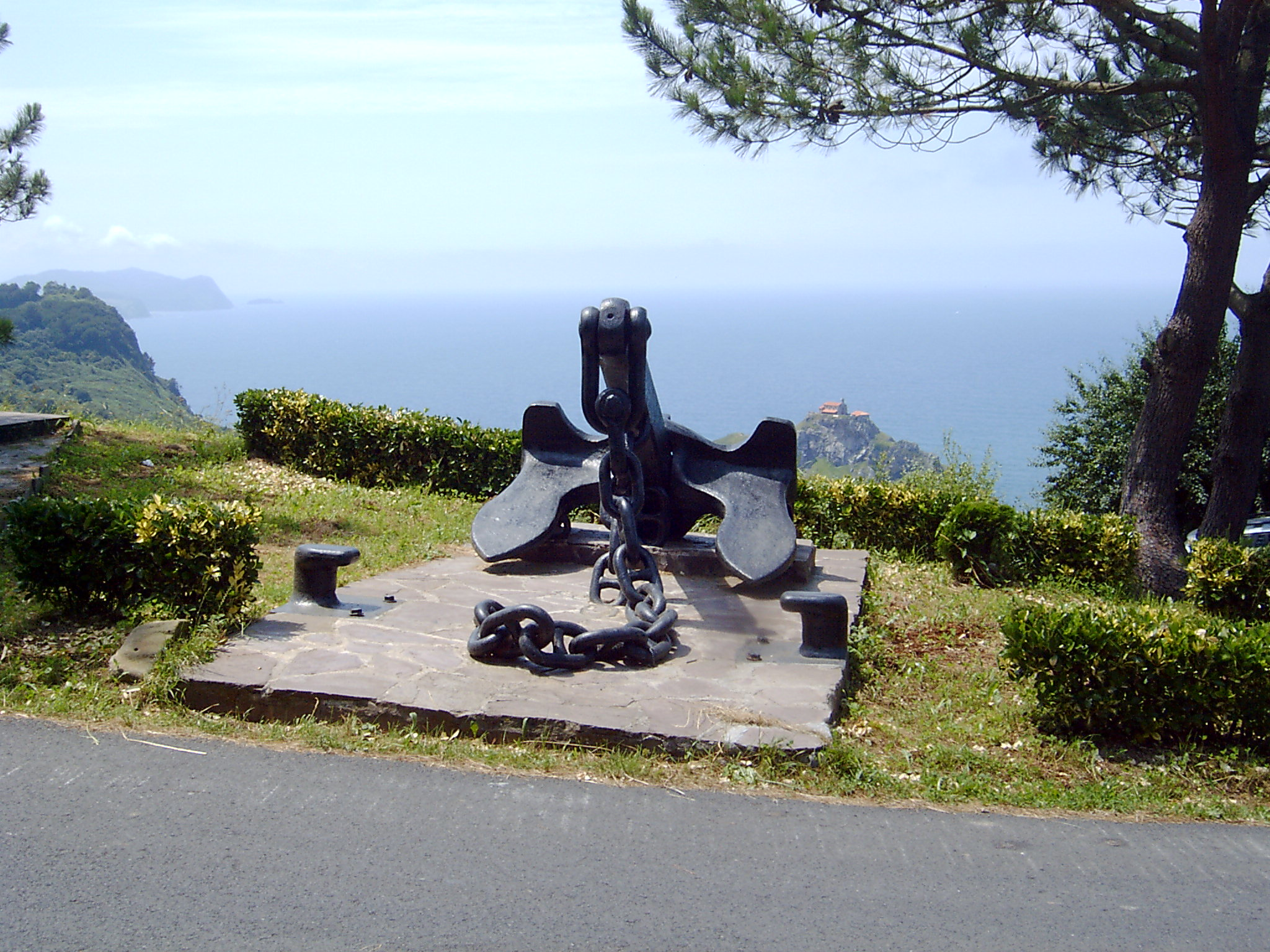

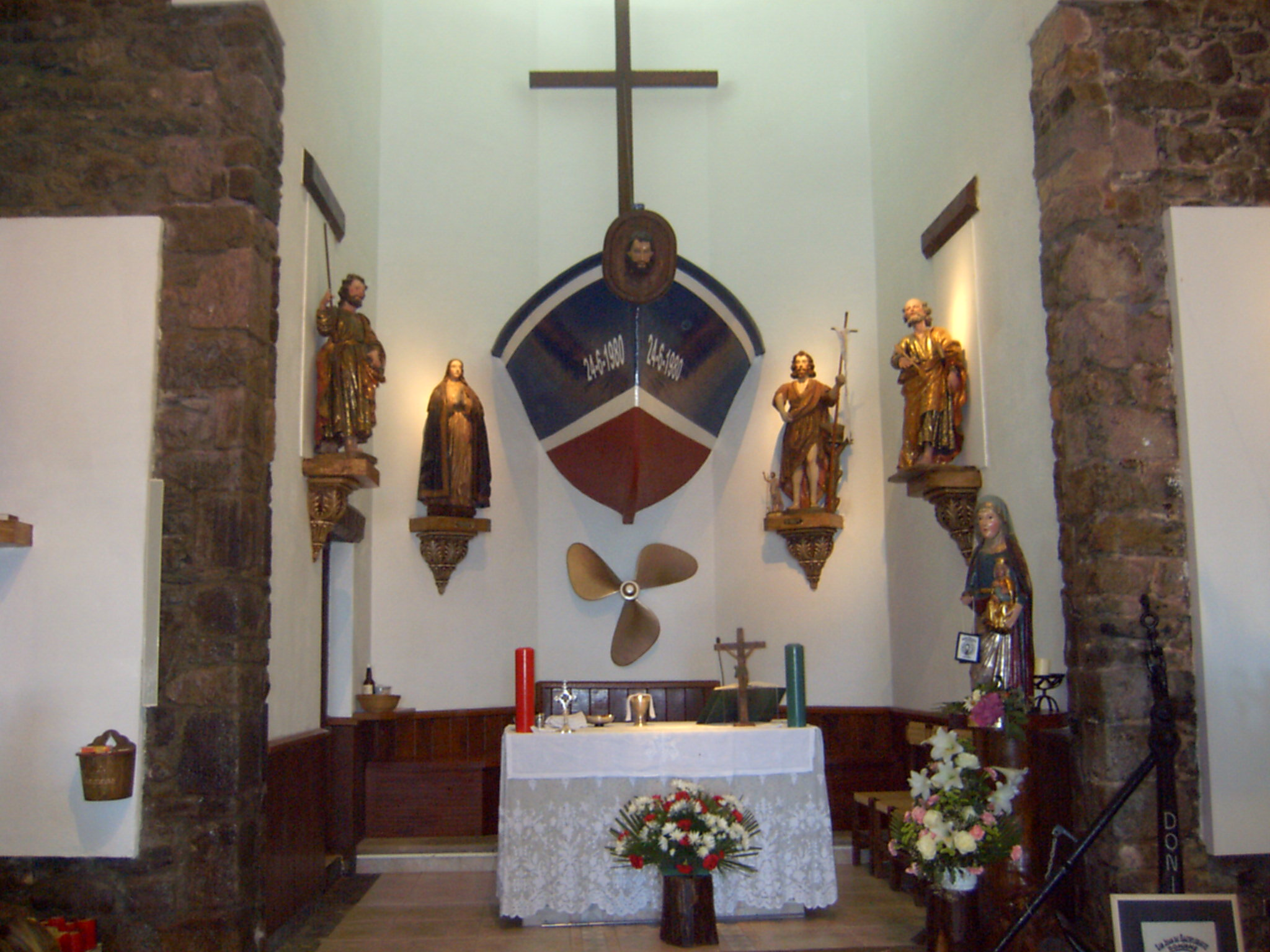

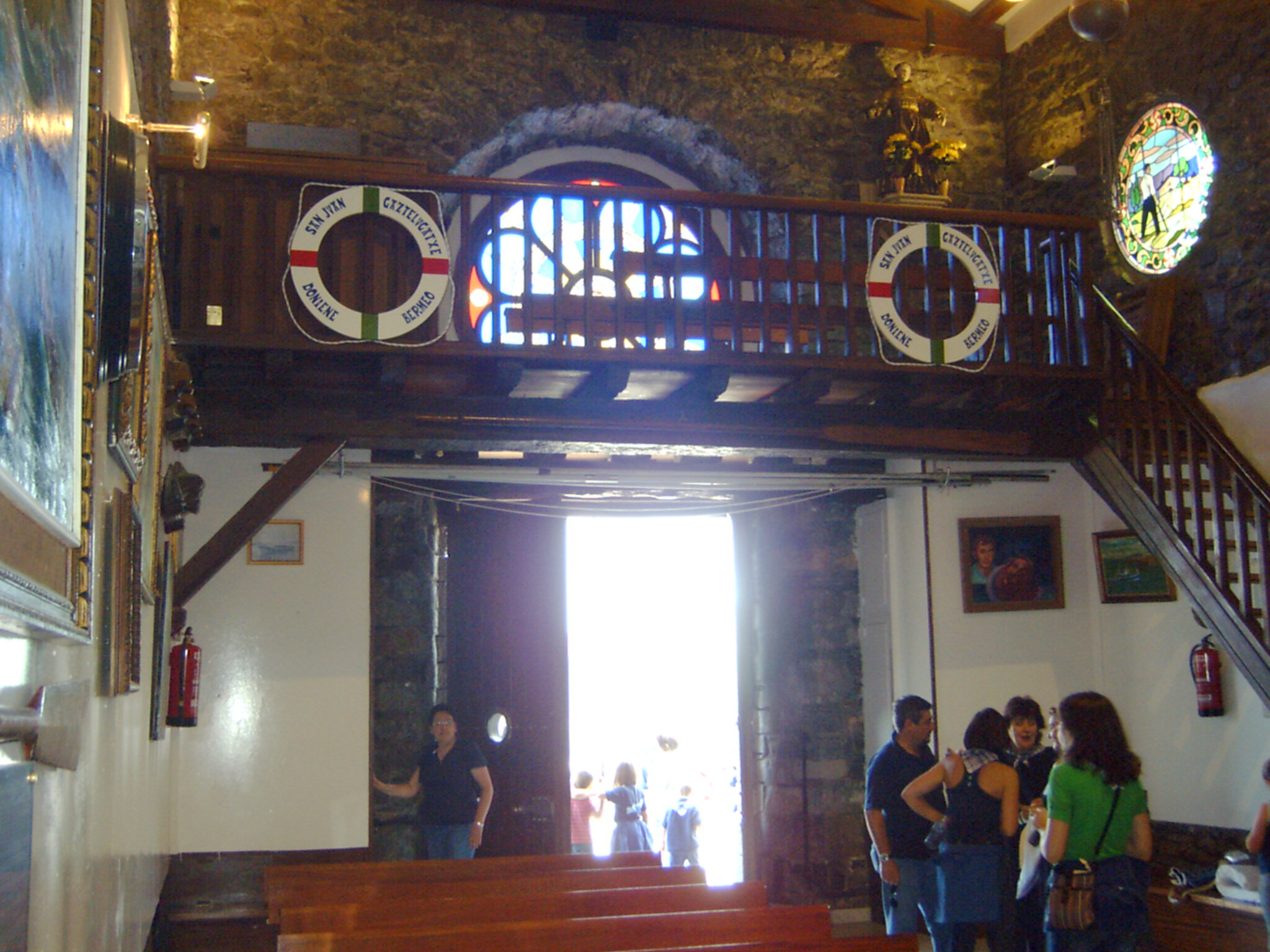

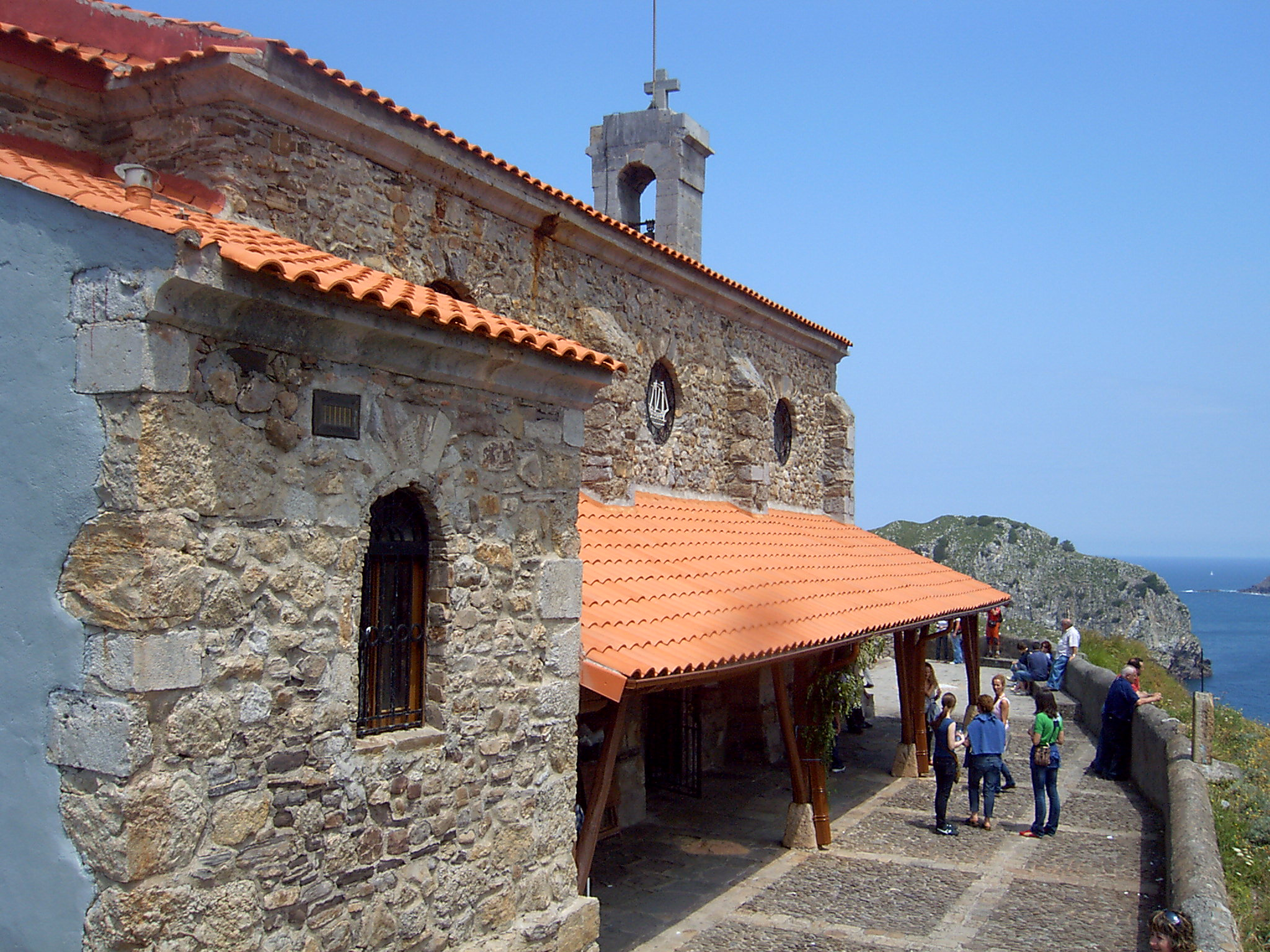

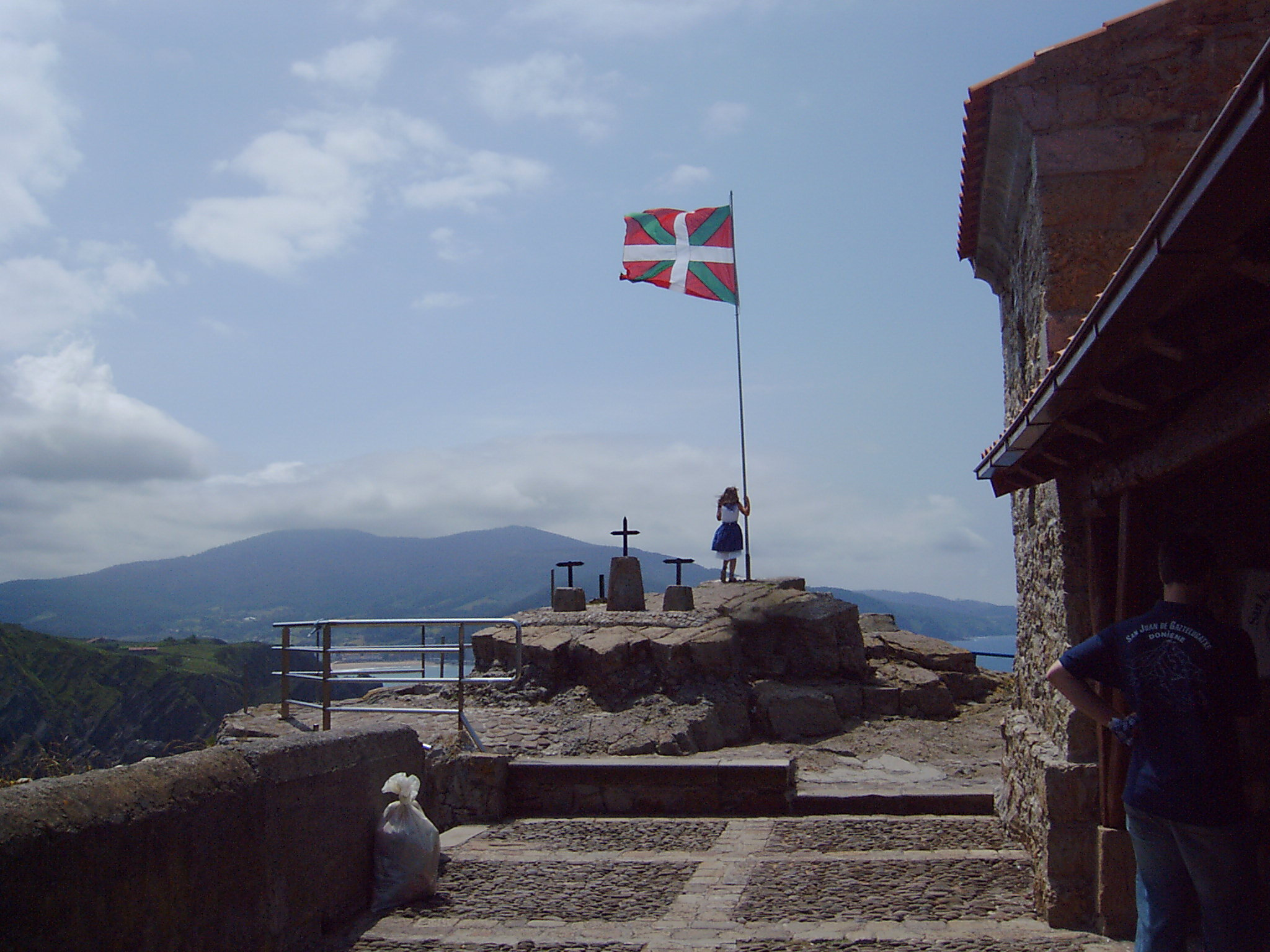
Gaztelugatxe, with Flag of Basque Country

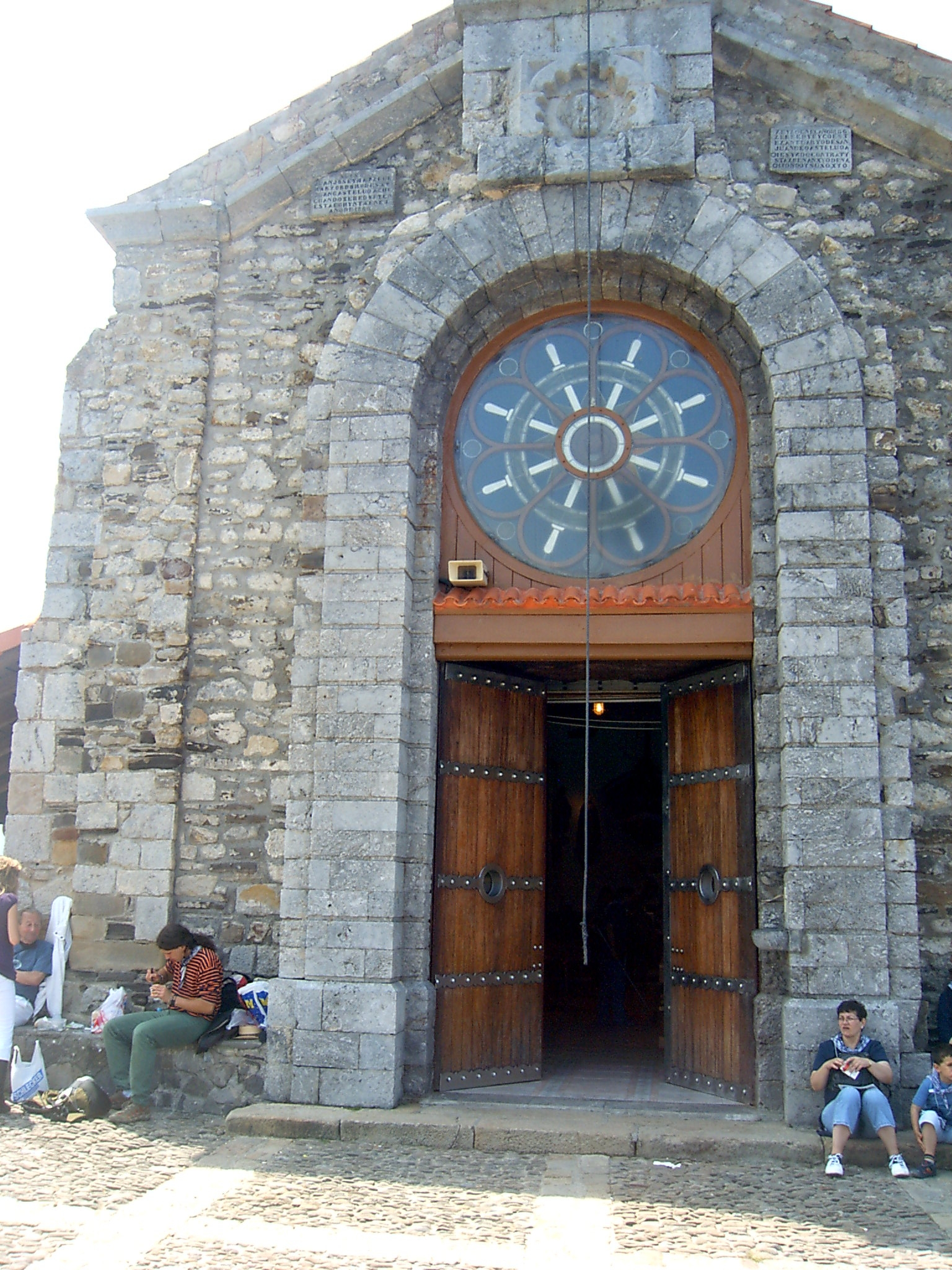

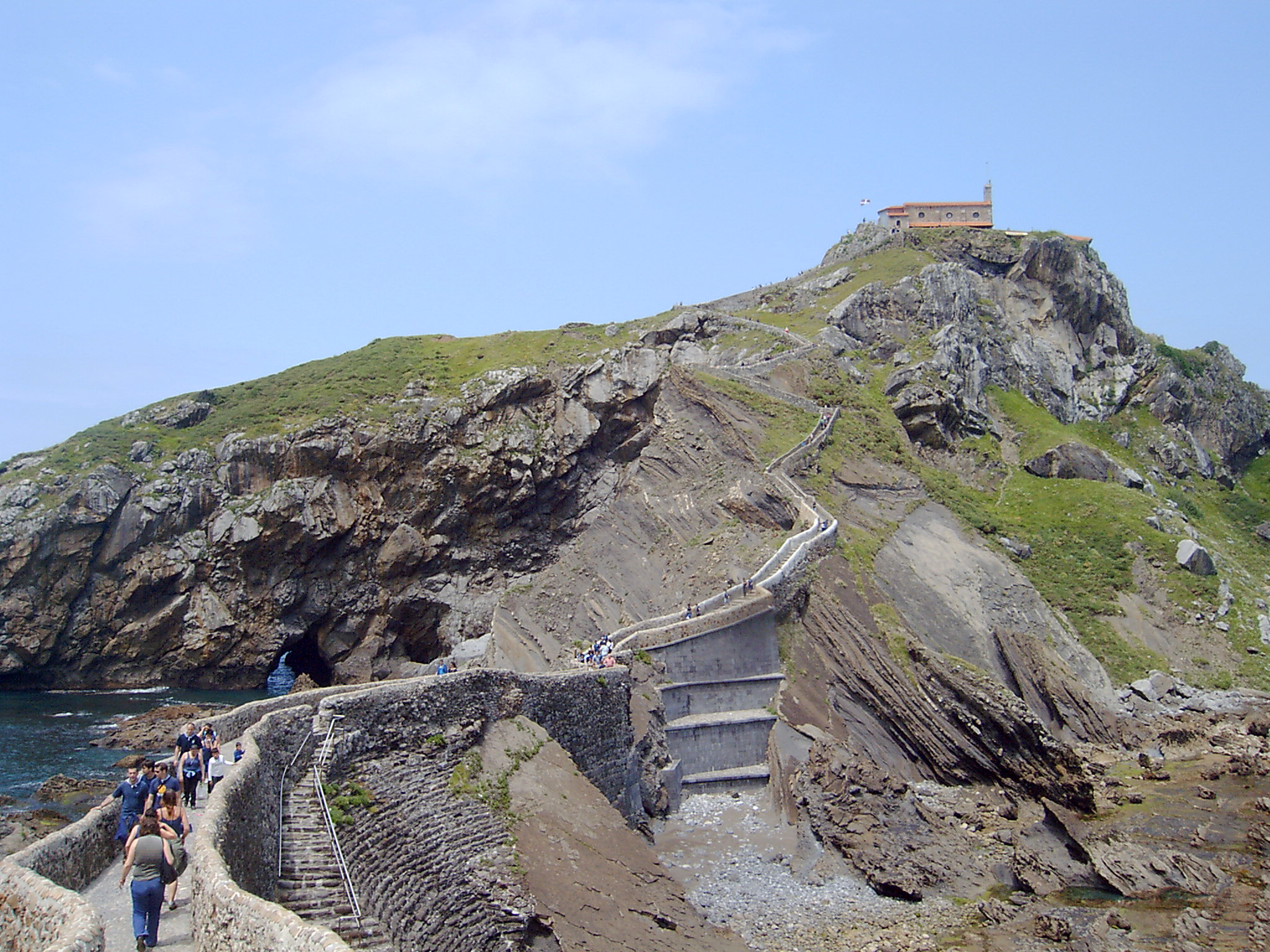

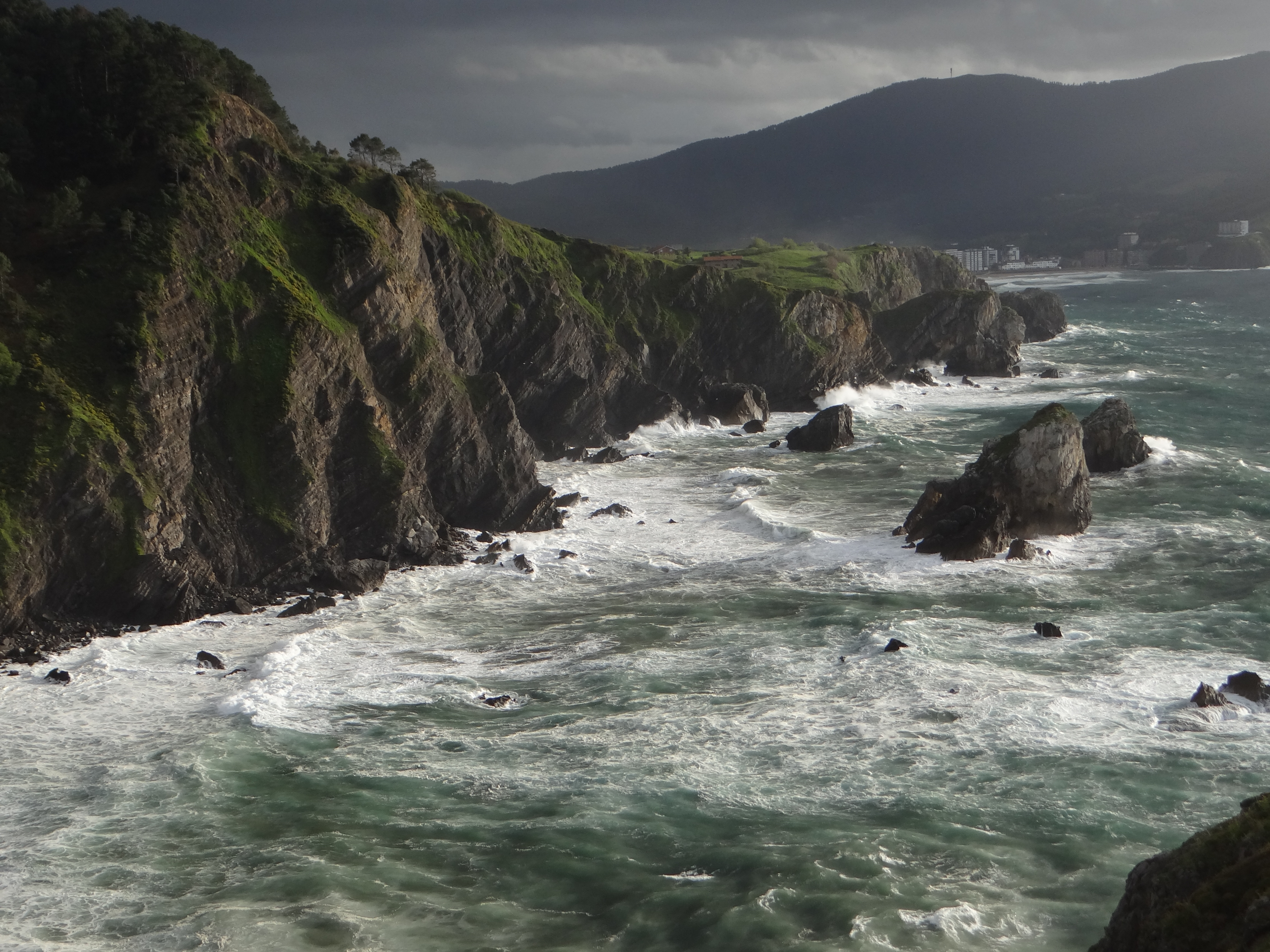

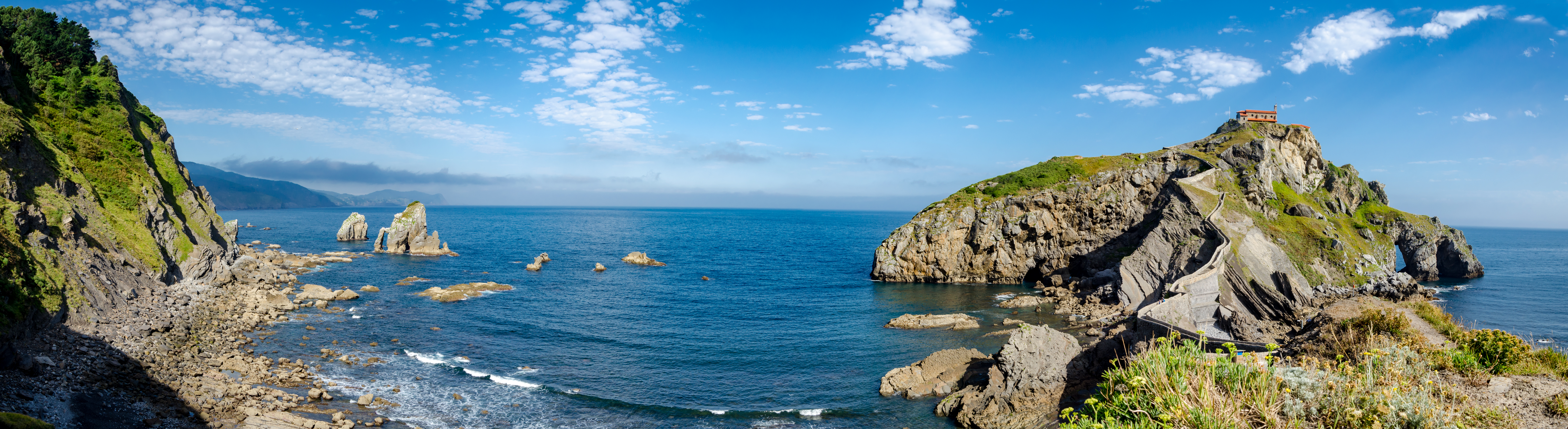
A panoramic view of Gaztelugatxe
