= Undués de Lerda =

Coordinates: 42°34′N 1°10′W

Undués de Lerda, Spain
- Flag Coat of arms
- Interactive map of Undués de Lerda, Spain
- Country: Spain
- Autonomous community: Aragon
- Province: Zaragoza
- Municipality: Undués de Lerda

Area
  - Total: 43 km^{2} (17 sq mi)
- Elevation: 633 m (2,077 ft)

Population (2025-01-01)
  - Total: 60
  - Density: 1.4/km^{2} (3.6/sq mi)
- Time zone: UTC+1 (CET)
  - Summer (DST): UTC+2 (CEST)

Undués de Lerda is a municipality located in the province of Zaragoza, Aragon, Spain. According to the 2004 census (INE), the municipality has a population of 60 inhabitants.

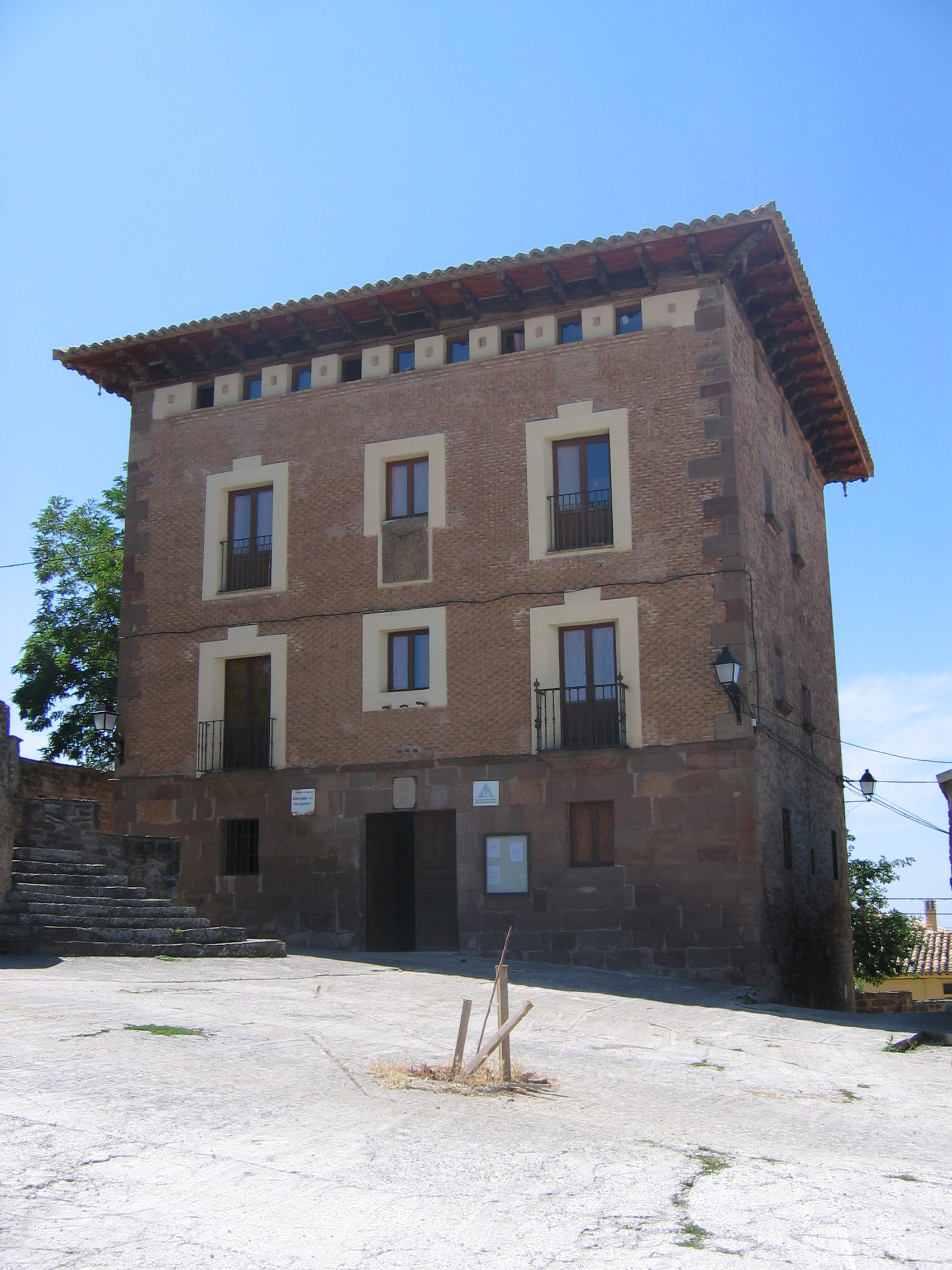
Youth Hostel in Undués de Lerda

== See also ==
- List of municipalities in Zaragoza
