= Church of Santa Maria (Busturia) =

Church in Basque Country, Spain

Church of Santa Maria de Axpe
- Iglesia de Santa María
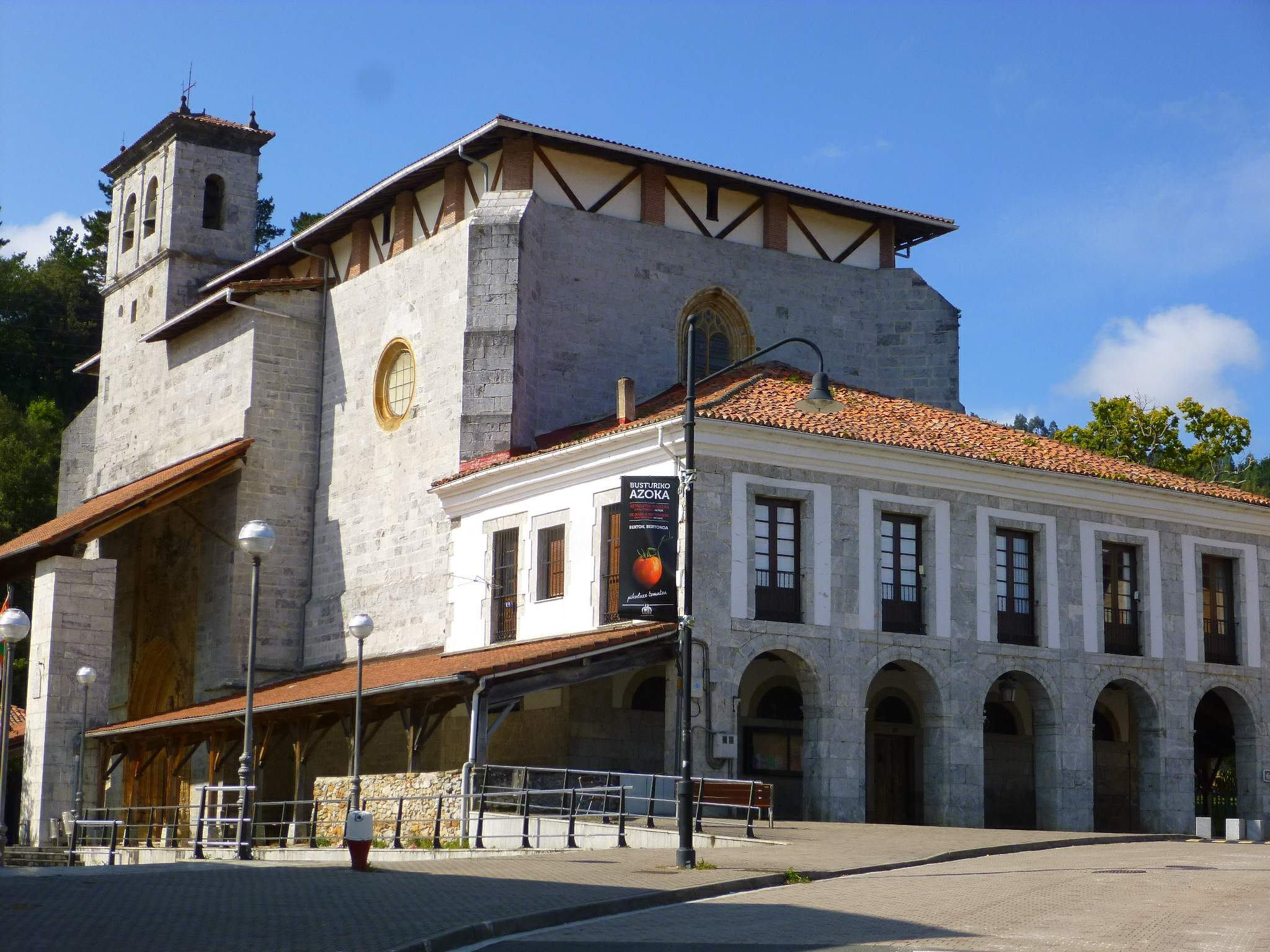
- Church in 2015

- Location of the church within Basque Country
- 43°22′57″N 2°42′01″W
- Address: Axpe Auzoa, 2, 48350 Busturi-Axpe, Bizkaia, Spain
- Country: Spain
- Denomination: Roman Catholic

Architecture
- Style: Late Gothic
- Completed: 16th century

Administration
- Diocese: Diocese of Bilbao

The Church of Santa Maria de Axpe (Spanish: Iglesia de Santa María; Basque: Andra Maria eliza) is a church located in the Axpe neighborhood of Busturia and serves as a Parish church for the town under the Diocese of Bilbao. It is recognized for its Gothic style and high level of preservation despite its age.

== History ==
According to oral history, in 1051, the Count of Biscay granted the bishop of Álava ownership over the monastery of the local parish, along with its land holdings which now encompass the church, including a nearby manor house that belongs to the church.

The church was rebuilt to be larger at the beginning of the 16th century, in a Basque Gothic style. It has an altarpiece that had been worked on by Pedro Aboítiz, Alejandro de Aguilar and Juan de Bilialdea, completed in 1638.

In 1852, Manuel Antonio de Luzarraga visited his hometown of Mundaka from his residence in Ecuador, and donated a bronze bell to the church. It has an inscription reading:

Spanish: "Fue dorado este Altar y erigido su nuevo presbiterio a expensas de Don Manuel Antonio de Luzárraga."

English (translation): "This altar was and its new presbytery erected at the expense of Don Manuel Antonio de Luzárraga."

== Design ==
The church is a stone building in the late Gothic style, with a single nave. It has a flat hevet and a side chapel that protrudes from the building. The outer roof is formed by a gable with a framework of wooden beams. The walls have been built with ashlars and the exterior support is buttressed on the four corners, while the interior support has four half-columns located on the sides of the building, and two in the corners at the presbytery and two at the corbels. There is a tower protruding for the bells in the church.

There are few openings to the church; there are two windows, located at the top of the building, and at the bottom, and two on the sides and two ogives on the sides at the back. This causes interior lighting to be quite poor.

== Gallery ==
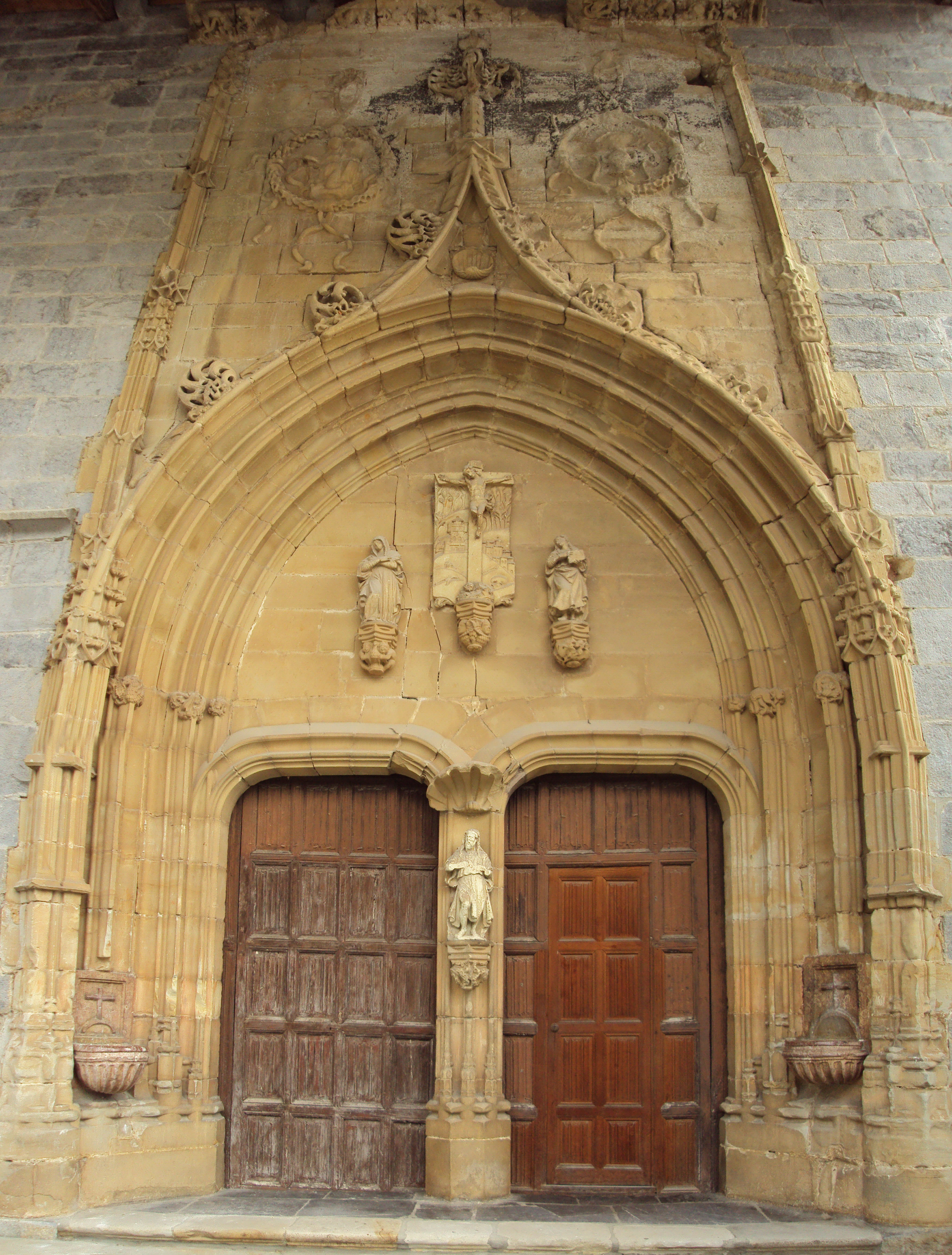
Entrance to the church

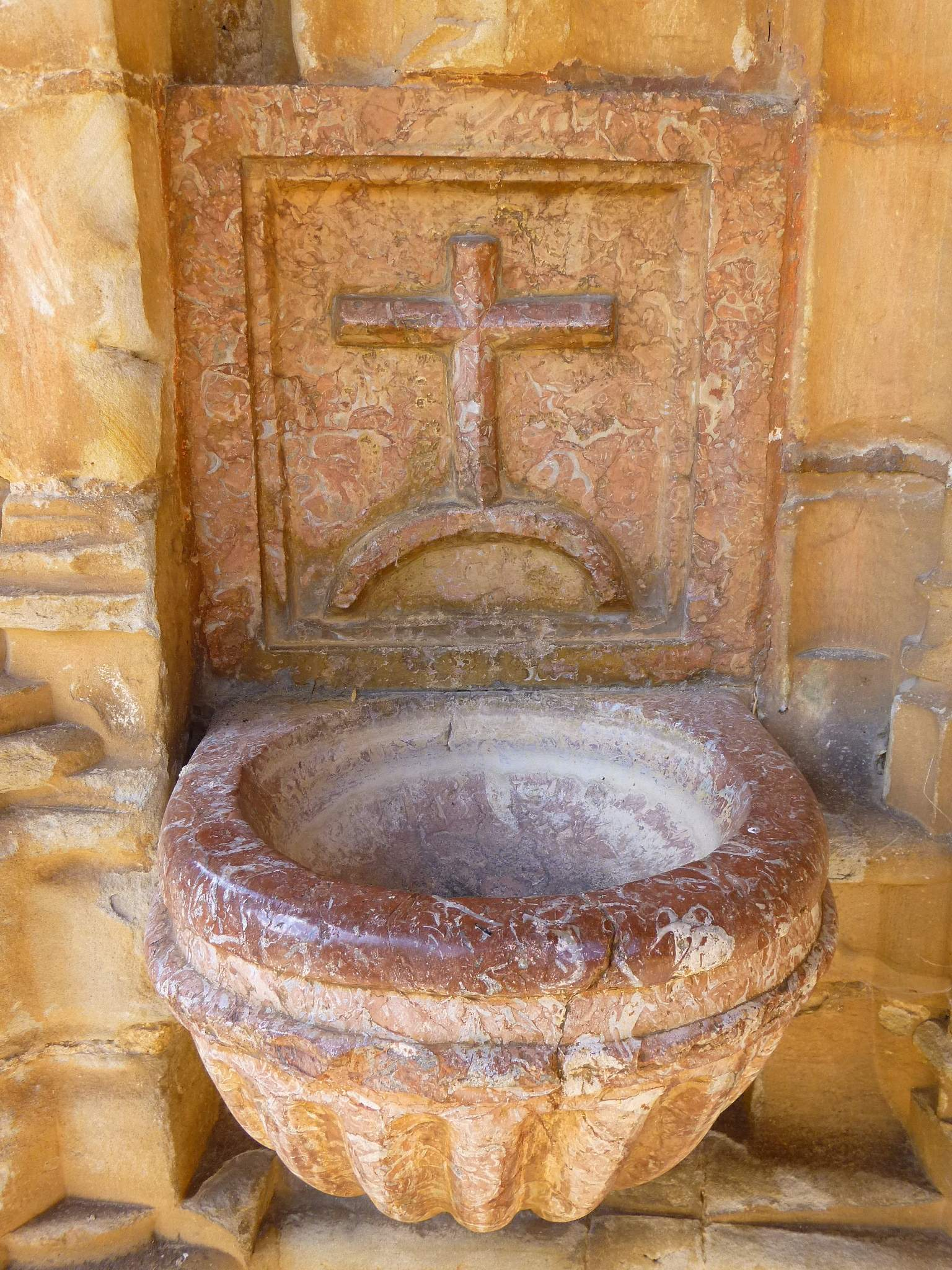
Masonry details of the exterior

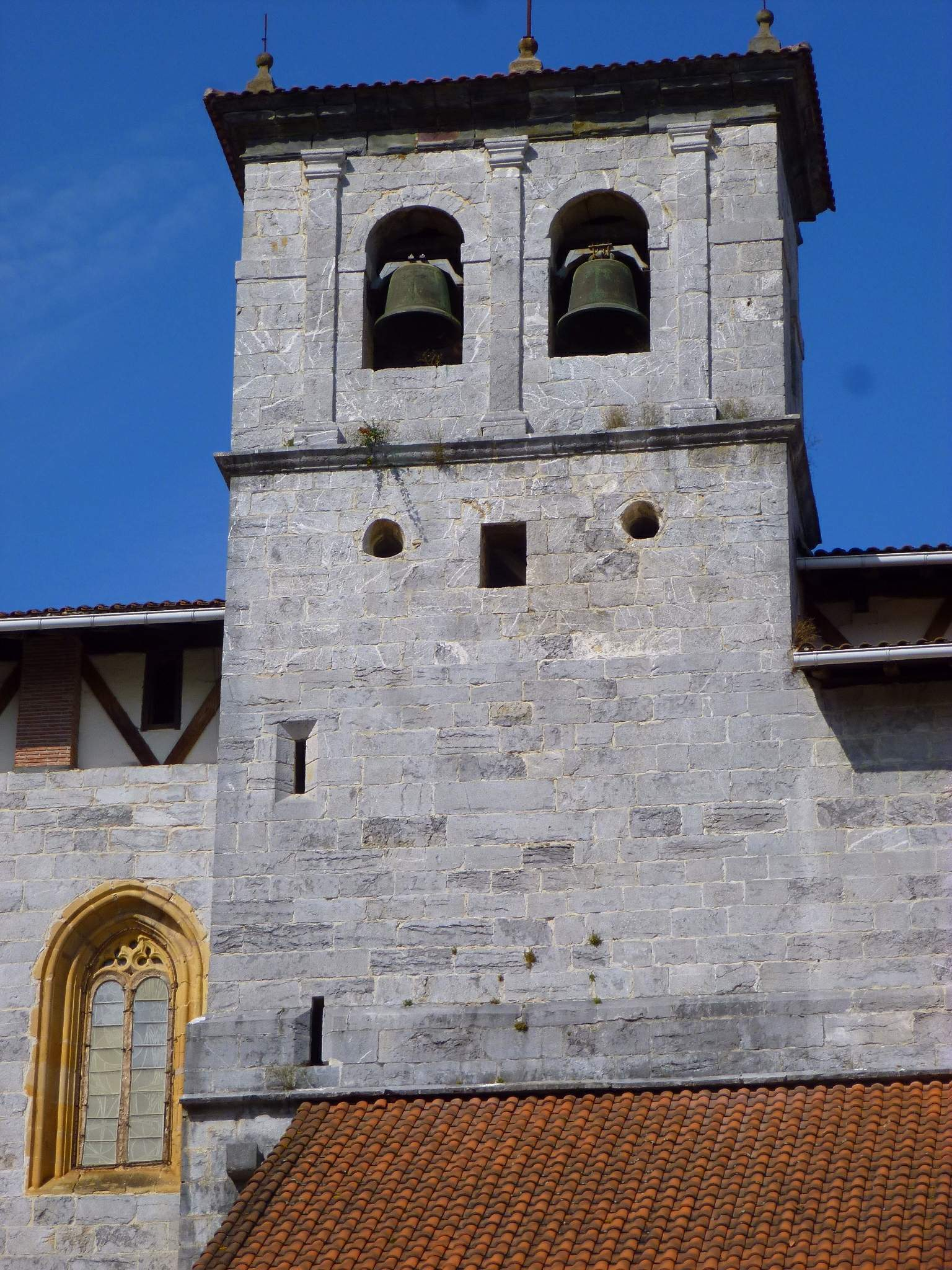
Bells tower
