= Agnes of Aquitaine, wife of Ramiro II of Aragon =

Queen of Aragon from 1135 to 1137

Agnes

Queen consort of Aragon
- Tenure: 1135– 1137
- Died: c. 1159
- Spouse: Aimery V, Viscount of Thouars; Ramiro II of Aragon
- Issue: William I, Viscount of Thouars; Guy, Lord of Oiron; Geoffrey IV, Viscount of Thouars; Petronilla, Queen of Aragon
- House: Poitiers
- Father: William IX, Duke of Aquitaine
- Mother: Philippa, Countess of Toulouse

Agnes of Aquitaine (French: Agnès, Spanish: Inés; c. 1105– c. 1159) was Queen of Aragon during her brief marriage to King Ramiro II, a former monk. The couple separated after the birth of their only child, Queen Petronilla, and retired to monasteries. Agnes chose the Abbey of Fontevraud, from where she continued to take part in the affairs of her sons from her first marriage to Viscount Aimery V of Thouars.

== First marriage ==
Agnes was the daughter of Duke William IX of Aquitaine and Countess Philippa of Toulouse. (Note: Jean Dunbabin indicates an unnamed daughter of William IX and Philippa married Viscount of Thouars) She was the namesake of her aunt Agnes, wife of King Peter I of Aragon and Navarre. Her first marriage, to Viscount Aimery V of Thouars, was celebrated some time prior to 9 January 1117, when the couple confirmed the possessions of the abbey of Saint-Laon de Thouars. Before Aimery's death in 1127, the couple had three sons:

- William I (died 1151), succeeded his father
- Guy, lord of Oiron (died c. 1149)
- Geoffrey IV (died 1173), succeeded William. Father of Guy of Thouars who married Constance, Duchess of Brittany. Grandfather of Alix of Thouars.

== Second marriage ==
On 13 November 1135 in the cathedral of Jaca, the ancient capital of the Kingdom of Aragon, Agnes married King Ramiro II, a monk who had resigned the bishopric of Roda in order to succeed his childless brother Alfonso the Battler. The anonymous contemporary author of the Chronica Adefonsi imperatoris attributes the initiative in Ramiro's marriage to the Aragonese:

They elected Alfonso's brother king. This man was a monk, and his name was Ramiro. They gave him the sister of the Count of Poitiers for a wife. Even though this was a great sin, the Aragonese did it, for they had lost their king and hoped that there would be an offspring from the royal family. . . King Ramiro went to his wife, and she conceived and gave birth to a daughter. . . He transferred the kingdom to his daughter and acknowledged his sins. He then did penance.

Agnes' age (approximately thirty) and proven fertility in her prior marriage were probably the main reasons the Aragonese sought her out. Agnes' brother, Duke William X, was also one of the few regional supporters of Antipope Anacletus II, who, as the weaker claimant to the papacy, might be persuaded to support Ramiro's irregular (and uncanonical) accession. Agnes' dowry was a church at Loscertales.

In a document from the same month as his marriage, Ramiro declares that he "took a wife not out of carnal lust, but for the restoration of the blood and the lineage" (uxorem quoque non carnis libidine, set sanguinis ac proienici restauratione duxi). Later medieval and early modern historians, embarrassed by the disregard for canon law, invented explanations to reconcile the marriage of a bishop with what was current in their own day. The fourteenth-century Chronicle of San Juan de la Peña records that messengers were sent to the pope to obtain the proper dispensation. The Aragonese translation of the same chronicle places Ramiro's religious status in doubt ("some chronicles say that he was not in holy orders", algunas cronónicas dizen que no era en sacres órdenes). At the Second Lateran Council in 1139, the church, perhaps influenced by the case of Ramiro and Agnes, declared the marriages of clerics to be null and void. Prior to this, they were legitimate, but illegal, marriages.

== Queenship ==
The first known royal diploma in which Agnes appears as queen is an original dated 29 January 1136. By August Agnes had borne Ramiro a daughter, Petronilla. Agnes' last appearance in an Aragonese document is from October 1136: a joint donation with her husband of a mill and a horse at Loscertales to the monastery of San Pedro de Antefruenzo. She and Ramiro may have separated shortly after this. Her brother died on a pilgrimage to Santiago de Compostela on 3 April 1137. It was probably during his passage through Iberia that his consent to the proposed marriage of the infant Petronilla was obtained; there is no evidence that Agnes took any part in arranging the future of her daughter.

In a series of acts between 11 August and 13 November 1137, Ramiro betrothed his daughter to the powerful Count Raymond Berengar IV of Barcelona, made his subjects swear an oath of allegiance to the count and then handed over the royal power to him. The transfer of power done, Ramiro returned to religious life and Agnes retired to the Abbey of Fontevraud, where her mother had lived. She is recorded there between 1141 and 1147, and there she died around 1159.

== Sources ==
- Dunbabin, Jean (1985). France in the Making 843-1180. Oxford University Press.
- Fletcher, Richard A. (1984). Saint James's Catapult: The Life and Times of Diego Gelmírez of Santiago de Compostela. Oxford: Oxford University Press.
- Imbert, Hugues (1876). Cartulaire de l'abbaye de Saint-Laon de Thouars. Niort: L. Clouzot.
- Lipskey, Glenn Edward (1972). The Chronicle of Alfonso the Emperor: A Translation of the Chronica Adefonsi imperatoris, with Study and Notes (PhD dissertation). Northwestern University.
- Lourie, Elena (1975). "The Will of Alfonso I, El Batallador, King of Aragon and Navarre: A Reassessment". Speculum. 50 (4): 635–51. doi:10.2307/2855471. JSTOR 2855471.
- Martindale, Jane (2001). "'An unfinished business': Angevin Politics and the Siege of Toulouse, 1159". In Gillingham, John (ed.). Anglo-Norman Studies XXIII: Proceedings of the Battle Conference 2000. The Boydell Press.
- McDougall, Sara (2016). Royal Bastards: The Birth of Illegitimacy, 800-1230. Oxford University Press.
- Reilly, Bernard F. (1998). The Kingdom of León–Castilla Under King Alfonso VII, 1126–1157. Philadelphia: University of Pennsylvania Press.
- Ubieto Arteta, Antonio (1987). Historia de Aragón: creación y desarrollo de la corona de Aragón. Zaragoza: Anubar. Archived from the original on 2014-07-15.
- Vajay, Szabolcs de (1966). "Ramire II le Moine, roi d'Aragon, et Agnès de Poitou dans l'histoire et dans la légende". Mélanges offerts à René Crozet. Poitiers: Société d'Etudes Médiévales. pp. 727–50.
- Waag, Anaïs (2022). Church, Stephen D. (ed.). "Rulership, Authority, and Power in the Middle Ages: The Proprietary Queen as Head of Dynasty". Anglo-Norman Studies XLIV: Proceedings of the Battle Conference 2021. The Boydell Press: 71–104.

== See also ==
- Dukes of Aquitaine family tree

Agnes of Aquitaine, wife of Ramiro II of Aragon House of Poitiers Born: circa 1105 Died: circa 1159
Royal titles
Preceded by Urraca of Léon	Queen consort of Aragon; 1135– 1137	Succeeded by Ramon Berenguer IV as consort
