= Sipan =

Sipan may refer to:

- Šipan, a Croatian island
- Sipán, a Moche archaeological site in northern Peru
- Mount Sipan, a mountain near Lake Van
- Sipan, Armenia
- Sipán, Spain, a village in the municipality of Loporzano

== See also ==
- Saipan (disambiguation)
