= Chronicle of the Peninsular States =

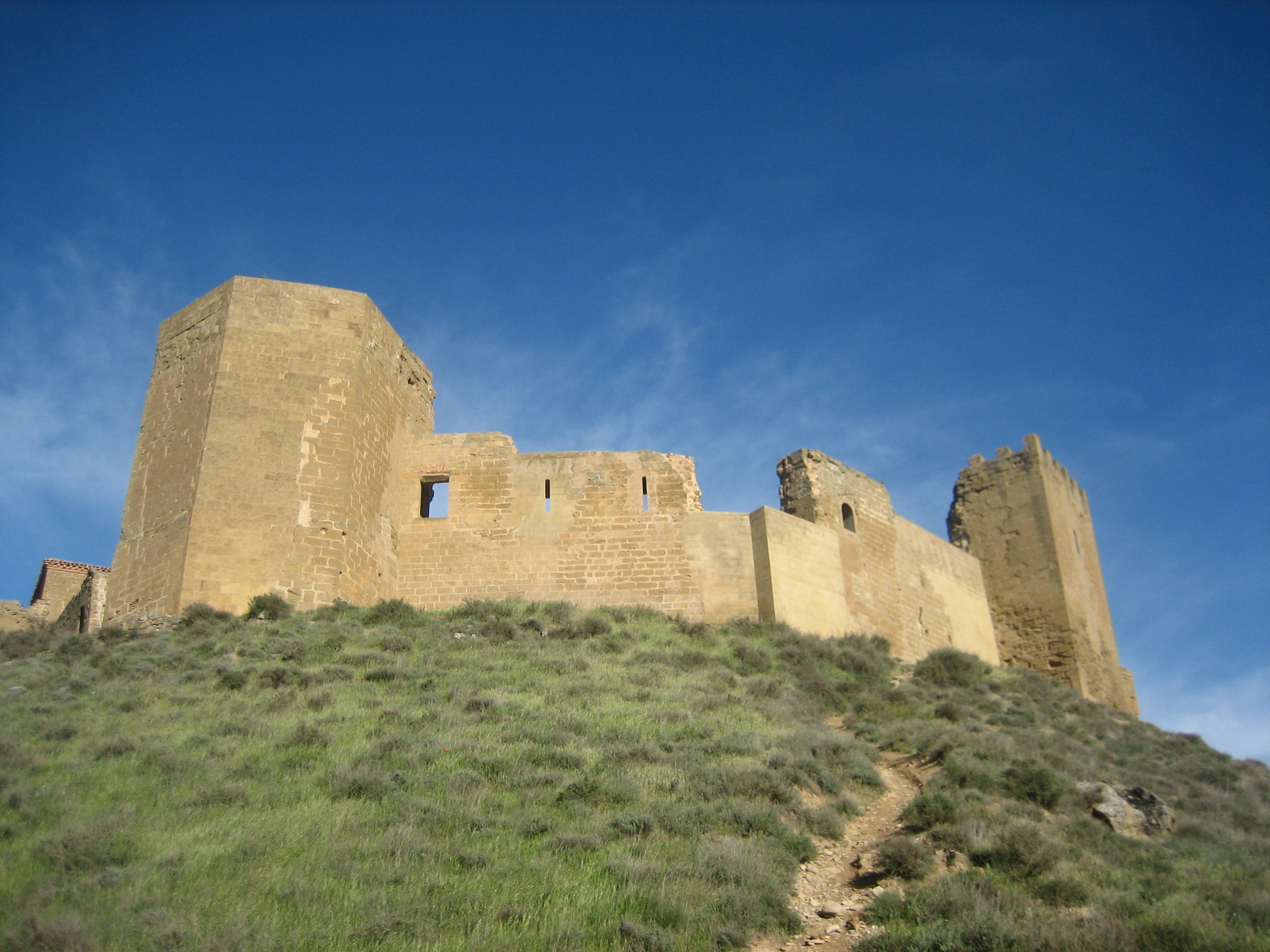
- Castle of Montearagón where the Chronicle was written
- Author: Anonymous monk
- Original title: Crónica de los Estados peninsulares
- Language: Catalan
- Genre: History
- Publication place: Spain

The Chronicle of the Peninsular States, also known as the Crónica de los estados peninsulares or Crónica navarro-aragonesa, is a general history of Spain written in the Aragonese language and focused on the kingdom of Aragon and its legendary origins in the kings of Sobrarbe preceding those of Navarre, whose first edition was completed in 1305, with its expansion in 1328. According to Antonio Ubieto Arteta, it was written by a monk from the Castle of Montearagón.

== Origins ==
=== Historical context ===
Its sources are mainly the Historia de rebus Hispaniae by Rodrigo Jiménez de Rada through its Aragonese version Estoria de los godos (1253) and the Crónicas de San Victorián, in addition to oral history. Its author points out that "this is found in some crown sources, especially in those of Sant Vitorián de Ribagorza. It, in turn, served as a source for the expanded version of the Crónica de San Juan de la Peña.

The chronicle seems to lack the beginning (which would narrate the Islamic conquest) and its end, which would cover the last kings of Aragon. Some relevant historical episodes in the history of Aragon are extensively treated, such as the Battle of Alcoraz (by which Huesca was won), the interventions of El Cid in this kingdom, or the conquests of Alfonso I the Battler, highlighting his military expedition through Andalusia.

The Archives of the Crown of Aragon, which make Barcelona a privileged city for research into medieval history, are a very complex whole; the unforgettable Jesus-Ernesto Martínez Ferrando fortunately published in 1958, with the help of his collaborators, a useful little guide: Guia abreviada del Archivo de la Corona de Aragón. We are pleased that in that same year, 1958, he also started a Cronological Index of the Colección de Documentos Inéditos del Archivo de la Corona de Aragón, the famous collection whose publication began in Madrid in 1847. Many less used deposits and less known in France offer great riches, not only the other Barcelona archives, in particular those of the city (Archivo Histórico de la Ciudad), those of the notaries (Archivo de Protocolos), those of the cathedral, those of the Biblioteca Central, but also the Valencian and Majorcan deposits, and the archives which are found in many other cities, notably in Zaragoza. Under the tenacious leadership of the current director of the Municipal Archives of Barcelona, Pedro Voltes Bou, useful publications for the use of this repository have been made; it was first for modern history, but now a recent volume of Aportaciones a la historia económica y social de la ciudad is of great interest to medievalists; three catalogs or guides constitute this volume: a directory of documents concerning overseas consuls and the sea consulate; a very long notice on the archives of the maritime consulate; finally, useful especially for historians of modern times, a list of merchants established in Barcelona from 1479 to 1696. As for the archives of Valencia, four publications in particular deserve to be noted: Los archivos de Valencia, by F. Mateu y Llopis; an inventory, due to Mr. Dualde Serrano, of the Testamentos de soberanos medievales preserved en el Archivo Real de Valencia, the Inventario de la documentación notarial del archivo municipal de Valencia, also drawn up by Mr. Dualde Serrano, and the Inuentario de los pergaminos del archivo de la catedral de Valencia, due to E. Olmos Canalda. Among the other inventories or catalogs drawn up in recent years, let us cite on the one hand the list of Aragonese and Navarrese deposits where documents written in Arabic or Hebrew are kept, on the other hand an analysis of the funds of the Order of Saint - John of Jerusalem, preserved at the Archivo Histórico Nacional in Madrid; these funds are a useful source for the study of the Aragonese Middle Ages, due to the role played by this order in the Reconquista. Finally, we must not forget that numerous documents concerning the history of the Crown of Aragon are found in the Colección Solazar, kept at the Real Academia de la Historia in Madrid; An Index of this collection has been published in several volumes, and it is in the first volume of this Index that we find the list of letters and documents concerning the countries of the Aragonese Crown: spread from 1213 to 1516. The Archives of the Crown of Aragon, which make Barcelona a privileged city for research into medieval history, are a very complex whole; the unforgettable Jesus-Ernesto Martínez Ferrando fortunately published in 1958, with the help of his collaborators, a useful little guide: Guia abreviada del Archivo de la Corona de Aragón. We are pleased that in that same year, 1958, he also started a Cronological Index of the Colección de Documentos Inéditos del Archivo de la Corona de Aragón, the famous collection whose publication began in Madrid in 1847. Many less used deposits and less known in France offer great riches, not only the other Barcelona archives, in particular those of the city (Archivo Histórico de la Ciudad), those of the notaries (Archivo de Protocolos), those of the cathedral, those of the Biblioteca Central, but also the Valencian and Majorcan deposits, and the archives which are found in many other cities, notably in Zaragoza. Under the tenacious leadership of the current director of the Municipal Archives of Barcelona, Pedro Voltes Bou, useful publications for the use of this repository have been made; it was first for modern history, but now a recent volume of Aportaciones a la historia económica y social de la ciudad is of great interest to medievalists; three catalogs or guides constitute this volume: a directory of documents concerning overseas consuls and the sea consulate; a very long notice on the archives of the maritime consulate; finally, useful especially for historians of modern times, a list of merchants established in Barcelona from 1479 to 1696. As for the archives of Valencia, four publications in particular deserve to be noted: Los archivos de Valencia, by F. Mateu y Llopis; an inventory, due to Mr. Dualde Serrano, of the Testamentos de soberanos medievales preserved en el Archivo Real de Valencia, the Inventario de la documentación notarial del archivo municipal de Valencia, also drawn up by Mr. Dualde Serrano, and the Inventario de los pergaminos del archivo de la catedral de Valencia, due to E. Olmos Canalda. Among the other inventories or catalogs drawn up in recent years, let us cite on the one hand the list of Aragonese and Navarrese deposits where documents written in Arabic or Hebrew are kept, on the other hand an analysis of the funds of the Order of Saint - John of Jerusalem, preserved at the Archivo Histórico Nacional in Madrid; these funds are a useful source for the study of the Aragonese Middle Ages, due to the role played by this order in the Reconquista. Finally, we must not forget that numerous documents concerning the history of the Crown of Aragon are found in the Colección Solazar, kept at the Real Academia de la Historia in Madrid. An Index of this collection has been published in several volumes, and it is in the first volume of this Index that we find the list of letters and documents concerning the countries of the Aragonese Crown: spread from 1213 to 1516.

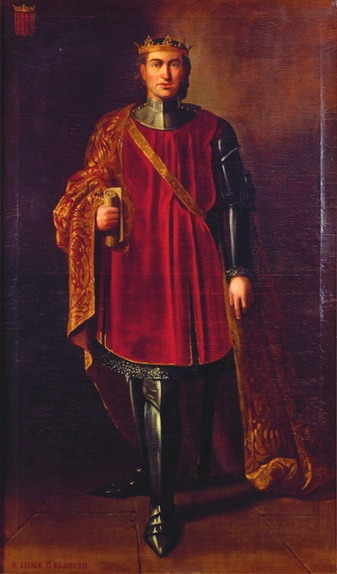
Imaginary portrait of King James II of Aragon (1267-1327), who was the son of King Peter III of Aragon and Queen Constance II of Sicily and also brother and successor of King Alfonso III of Aragon.

Indeed, from 1089, the Augustinian community which was located at the Monastery of San Juan de la Peña was transferred to the new castle that was simply built, and this confirming the new key role of the Castle-Monastery of Montearagón, in order to better protect the Augustinian religious community in the face of military unrest in particular.

=== Document context ===
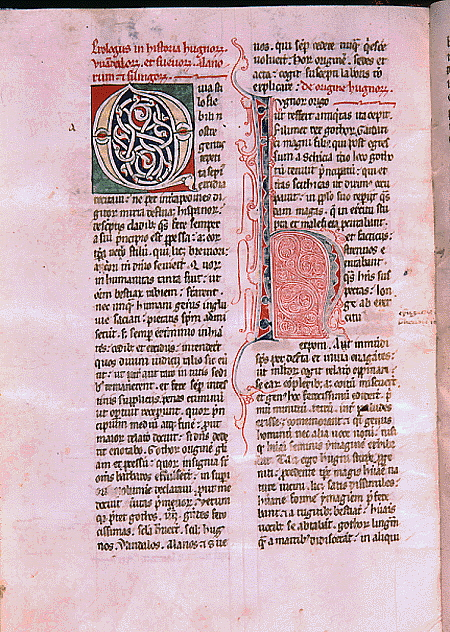
Manuscript of “De rebus Hispaniae”.

The writing of the "Aragonese Chronicle" came into being following the composition of a literary document entitled "De rebus Hispaniae", or "historia gótica" whose author is none other than the bishop of Toledo Rodrigo Jiménez de Rada. In fact, King Ferdinand III, known as the holy king of Castile, supported the Bishop of Toledo in the writing of this chronicle, the first production of which made it possible to use Latin as the vernacular language.

In late medieval Castilian royal chronicles, the way in which rulers are shown disempowering their subjects, and what this meant for them, evolved significantly between the mid-14th, 19th centuries, and mid-15th century. Stories of removal from royal power are most often framed by descriptions of legal proceedings. Yet the nature of this justice and the way in which rulers acted to separate person and power changed greatly during this period. These changes were the consequence of two key periods of innovation in judicial institutions and expressions of royal authority, one in the last decades of the fourteenth century, the other after 1420. Depictions of sovereigns despoiling specific assets to punish crimes have given way to sovereigns deploying their authority, justified by their interests, to limit the ability of their rivals to exercise.

Also in 1253, the Aragonese version was published as Estoria de los Godos, allowing both versions of the history of the Goths to trace the legendary origins of the kingdom of Aragon, and Castile, in a context where the Christian kingdoms sought to legitimize their powers in order to regain control over the Iberian territories conquered by the Muslims since 711, where the Visigoth kingdom ceased to exist leading to the primacy of the Emirate of Cordoba between the 8th century and the 10th century. The Chronicle of San Juan de la Peña followed the second reissue of the "Aragonese Chronicle" republished in 1328. Indeed, the King of Aragon Peter IV participated in the rewriting of a legendary history of the kings of Aragon in its translation into Latin, allowing his legitimate power to be rooted in a dynastic heredity specific to the kings of Aragon.

== Characteristics ==
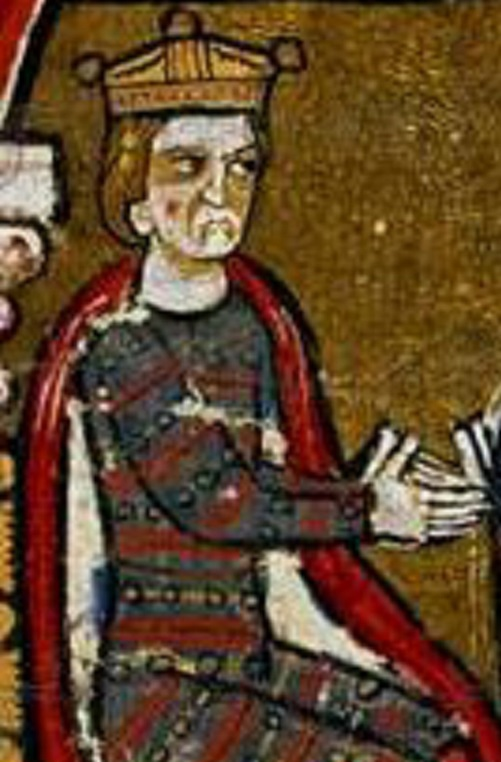
Peter II “the Catholic”, illumination from the “Liber feudorum” Ceritaniae. Unique contemporary representation of the sovereign, made between 1200 and 1209. fol. 64v. Reg. n.º 4. Archives of the Crown of Aragon.

=== Literary facts ===
The very first literary characteristic noted in the "Aragonese Chronicle" concerns the Catalan term poagra, whose root comes from the Greek podágra. This term was first documented, notably because of a disease marked by an increase in uric acid concentrated in the blood and which also affects the feet. A very specific mention explained and written down in the Aragonese chronicle shows the cause of the death of the king of León, Ordoño IV or Bermudo II, nicknamed "el Gotoso" because of adverse effects caused by poagra.

=== Historical facts ===
Secondly, the "Aragonese Chronicle" relates above all the context of the Reconquista, and the role played by the successions of kings of Aragon against the Muslims established in the Iberian Peninsula with sovereigns such ^{as} Peter I. of Aragon, Peter II of Aragon, Peter III of Aragon “called the Great”; but also through the childhood of the future king of Aragon Peter IV “called the Ceremonious ”, and who was still only the presumptive heir to the Aragonese crown at the time of the second reissue of the vernacular chronicle in 1328. We can cite in particular the battle of Las Navas de Tolosa which took place in 1212, in which the Castillo-Aragonese coalition led by Peter I ^{of} Aragon, and Alfonso VIII of Castile defeated the Muslim army, which allowed the chronicle to show how the kings of Aragon had their own roles to play, to liberate the Hispanic territories from Muslim domination at the beginning of the 13th ^{century}. The battle of Alcoraz won by the Aragonese in the 10th century, the role played by Rodrigo Díaz de Vivar nicknamed “El Cid Campeador”, making it possible to fight effectively against the Moors established in the Iberian Peninsula, through his reconquest of the city of Toledo in the 11th ^{century} in particular, testify to central elements of the "Aragonese Chronicle" , rooting the legitimacy of the literary and iconographic document propagated thanks to its publication, and considered as a history of dynastic origins conducive to the flourishing of the kingdom of Aragon, and linked in parallel to its territorial struggle against the Muslims during the context of the Reconquista, but also with the aim of strengthening the power of the kings of Aragon.

== See also ==
- Castle of Montearagón
- Chronicle of San Juan de la Peña
- De rebus Hispaniae
