= Agnes, Queen of Aragon =

Agnes, Queen of Aragon may refer to:

- Agnes, wife of Ramiro I of Aragon, (fl. 1054–1062), perhaps of Aquitaine, perhaps identical to the Countess of Savoy
- Agnes of Aquitaine, Queen of Aragon and Navarre, (1072–1097), wife of King Peter I of Aragon and Navarre
- Agnes of Aquitaine, wife of Ramiro II of Aragon, (c. 1105 – c. 1159) wife of Aimery V of Thours and Ramiro II of Aragon
