= Ayera =

- Locality
- Location within Aragon Location within Spain
- Coordinates: 42°10′32″N 0°18′3″W
- Country: Spain
- Autonomous community: Aragon
- Province: Province of Huesca
- Municipality: Loporzano
- Elevation: 584 m (1,916 ft)

Population
  - Total: 12

Ayera is a locality located in the municipality of Loporzano, in Huesca province, Aragon, Spain. As of 2020, it has a population of 12.

== Geography ==
Ayera is located 18km east-northeast of Huesca.
