= La Almunia del Romeral =

- Locality
- Location within Aragon Location within Spain
- Coordinates: 42°12′23″N 0°16′49″W
- Country: Spain
- Autonomous community: Aragon
- Province: Province of Huesca
- Municipality: Loporzano
- Elevation: 641 m (2,103 ft)

Population
  - Total: 36

La Almunia del Romeral is a locality located in the municipality of Loporzano, in Huesca province, Aragon, Spain. As of 2020, it has a population of 36.

== Geography ==
La Almunia del Romeral is located 24km northeast of Huesca.
