= Bandaliés =

- Locality
- Location within Aragon Location within Spain
- Coordinates: 42°9′48″N 0°17′53″W
- Country: Spain
- Autonomous community: Aragon
- Province: Province of Huesca
- Municipality: Loporzano
- Elevation: 562 m (1,844 ft)

Population
  - Total: 57

Bandaliés is a locality located in the municipality of Loporzano, in Huesca province, Aragon, Spain. As of 2020, it has a population of 57.

== Geography ==
Bandaliés is located 16km east-northeast of Huesca.
