= Abbey of San Pedro el Viejo =

Former Benedictine monastery in Spain

Coordinates: 42°08′17″N 0°24′26″W

- Monasterio de San Pedro el Viejo
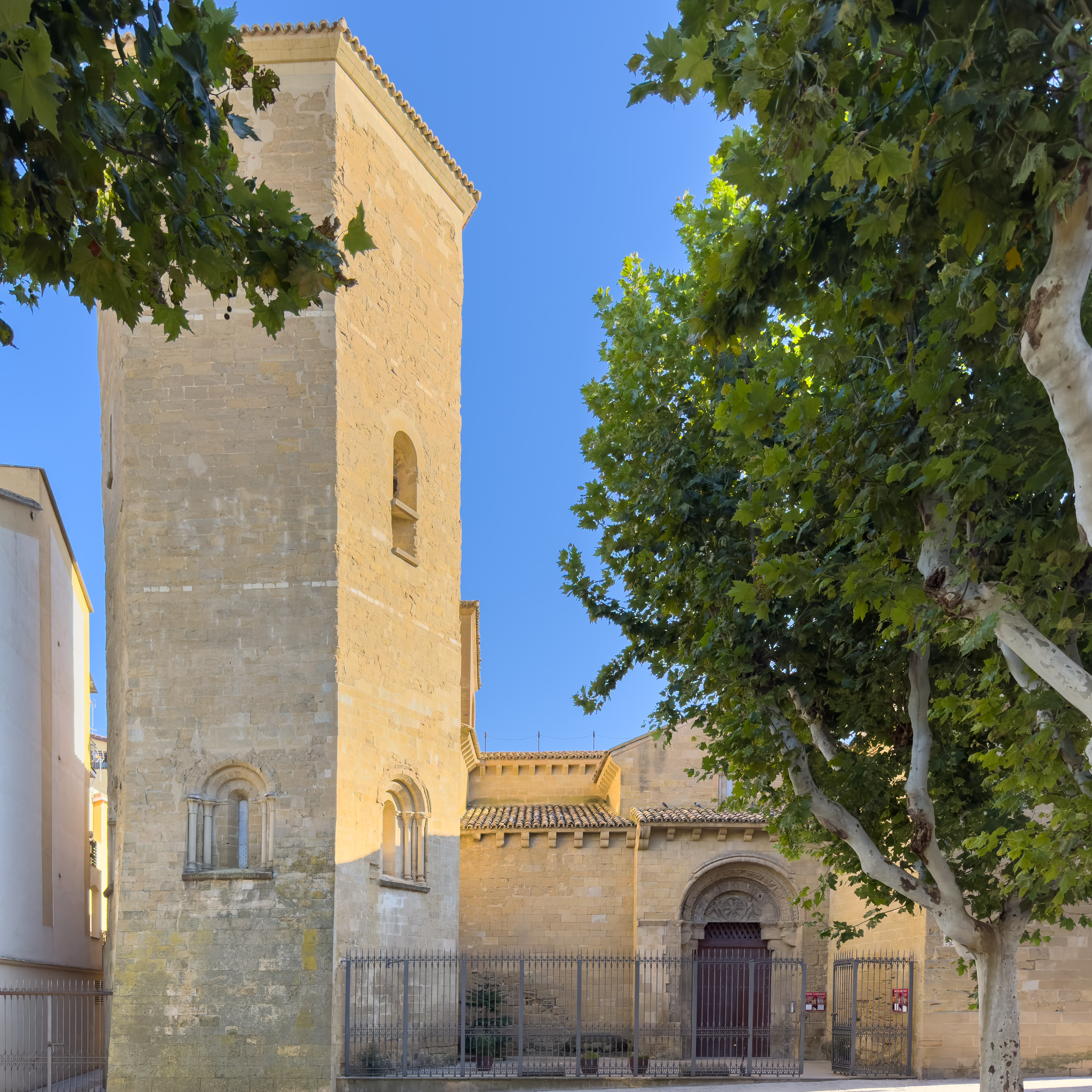

Religion
- Affiliation: Catholic Church
- Region: Aragon

Location
- Location: Huesca
- Country: Spain
- Interactive map of Abbey of San Pedro el Viejo

Architecture
- Type: Romanesque
- Founder: Order of Saint Benedict
- Established: 12th century

The Abbey of San Pedro el Viejo (Spanish: Monasterio de San Pedro el Viejo) is a former Benedictine monastery in the old town of Huesca, Aragon, Spain.

== History ==
The present Romanesque structure was built by the Benedictines in the 12th century. The name "San Pedro el Viejo", or "Saint Peter the Old", refers to the fact that the Visigothic monastery building that was given to them predated the Moorish occupation.

The site now consists mostly of the cloisters and the church. It has been a national monument since 1886, and is one of the most important buildings for the Romanesque architecture of Aragon.

The abbey celebrated the 900th anniversary of its construction in 2017.

The former chapter room has been since the 13th century the Chapel of San Benito or Royal Pantheon (Panteón Real) and contains the tombs of two kings of Aragon: Alfonso I, the Battler, and his brother and successor Ramiro II, the Monk.

== Architecture ==
The building has two main parts: the church and the cloister.

The church consists of three ships and their apses. The altarpiece is polychrome wood by Juan de Ali (artist Navarre) in the early 17th century. The church chapels surrounding the show interesting artwork from different periods:

- Altarpiece of the Virgin of Hope (16th century). Renaissance.
- Altarpiece of Saints Just and Pastor (17th century). Baroque.
- Altarpiece of the Annunciation (15th-16th century). Gothic.
- 13th century murals.
- Wooden choir stalls (17th century)

== Gallery ==
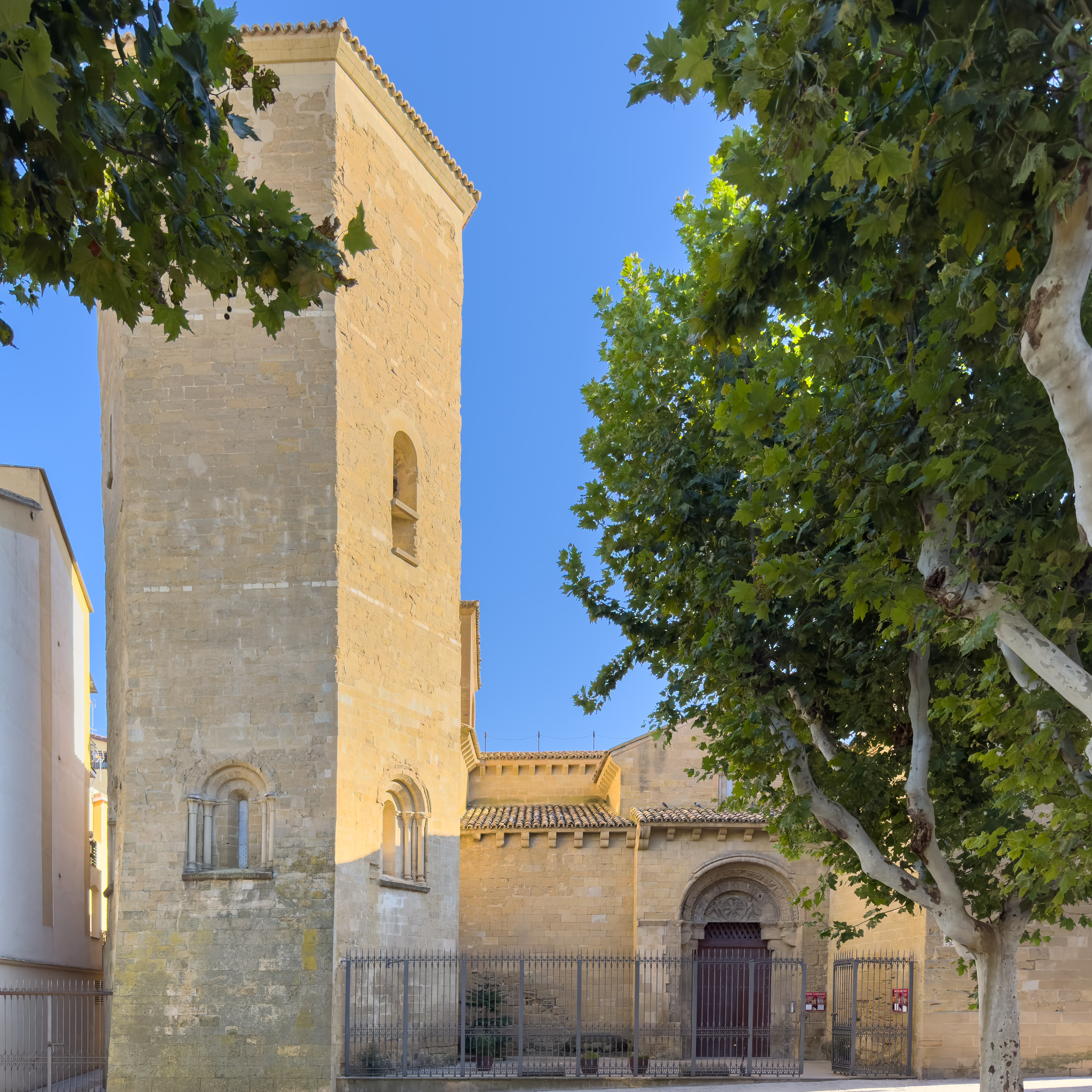
Exterior

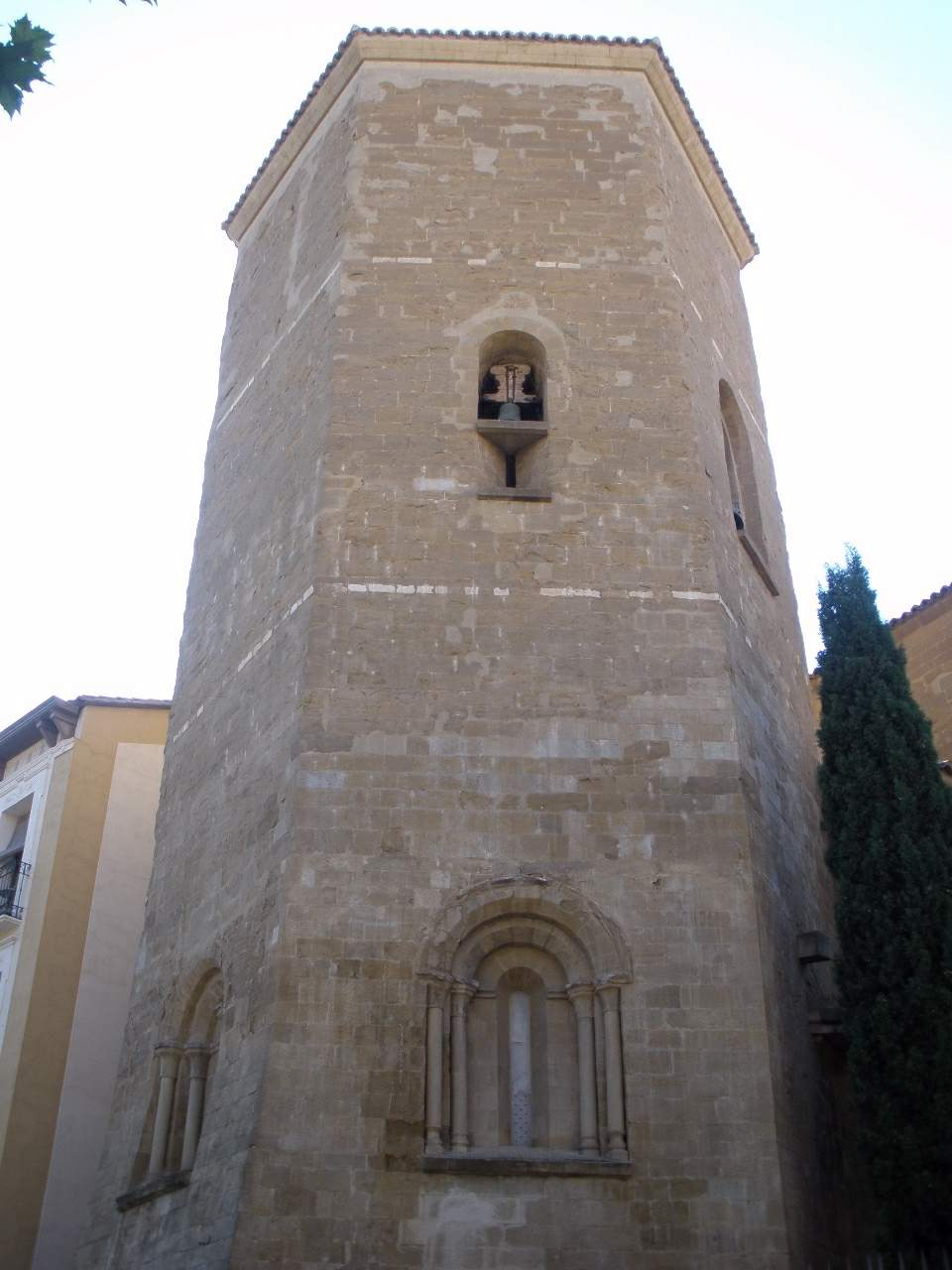
Tower

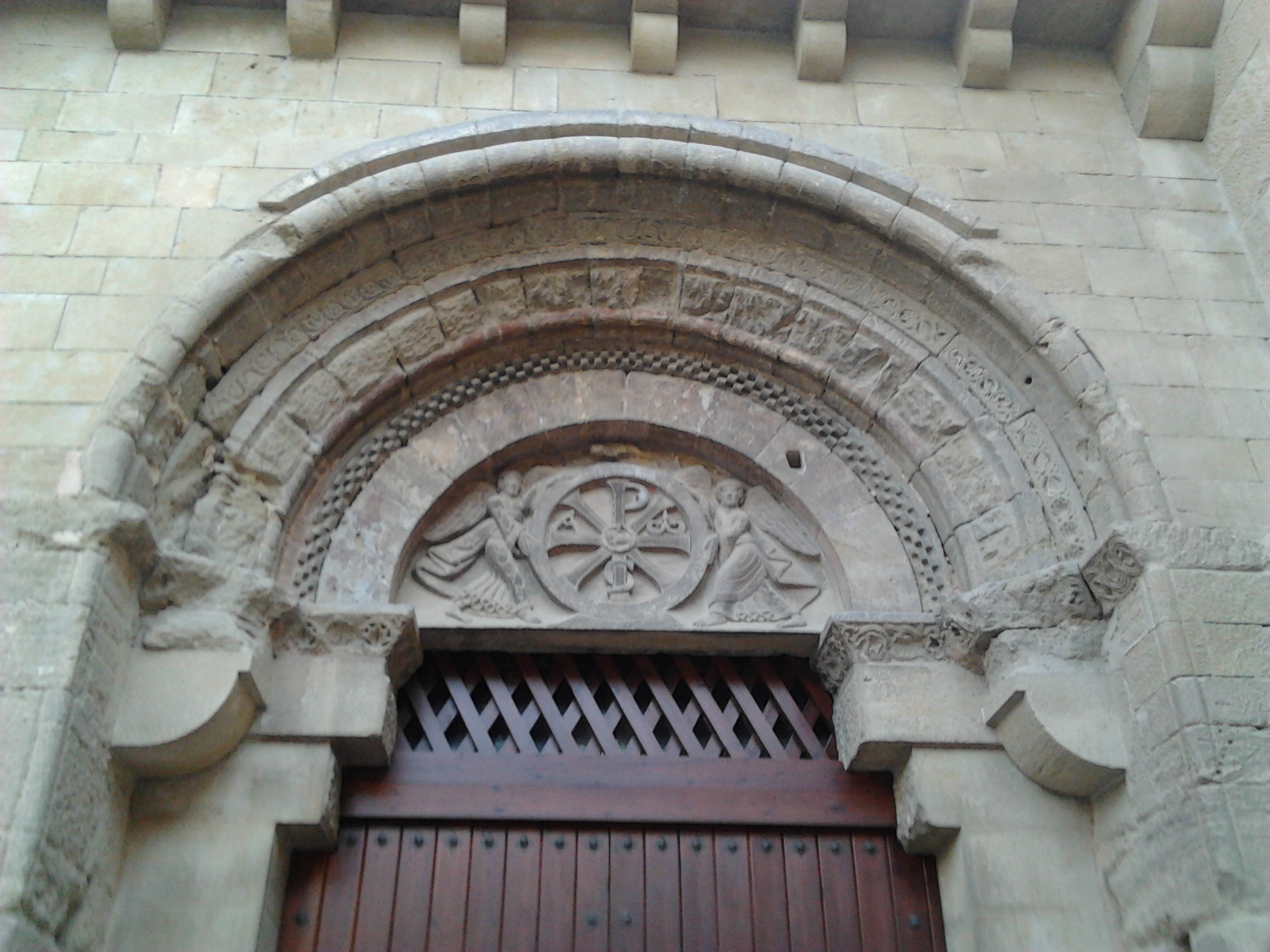
Portal. Note the checkered pattern above the tympanum

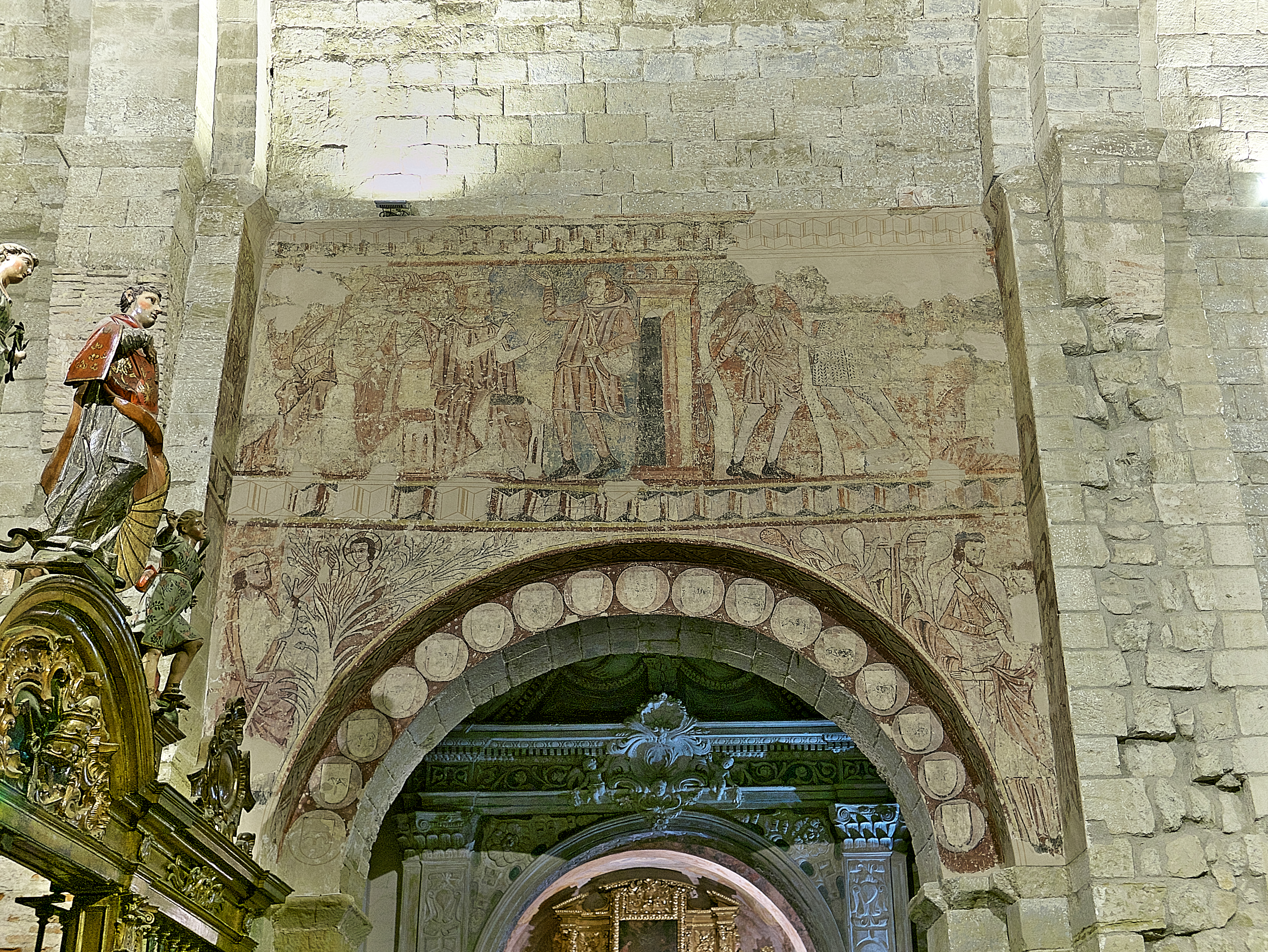
Gothic wall paintings with the story of David

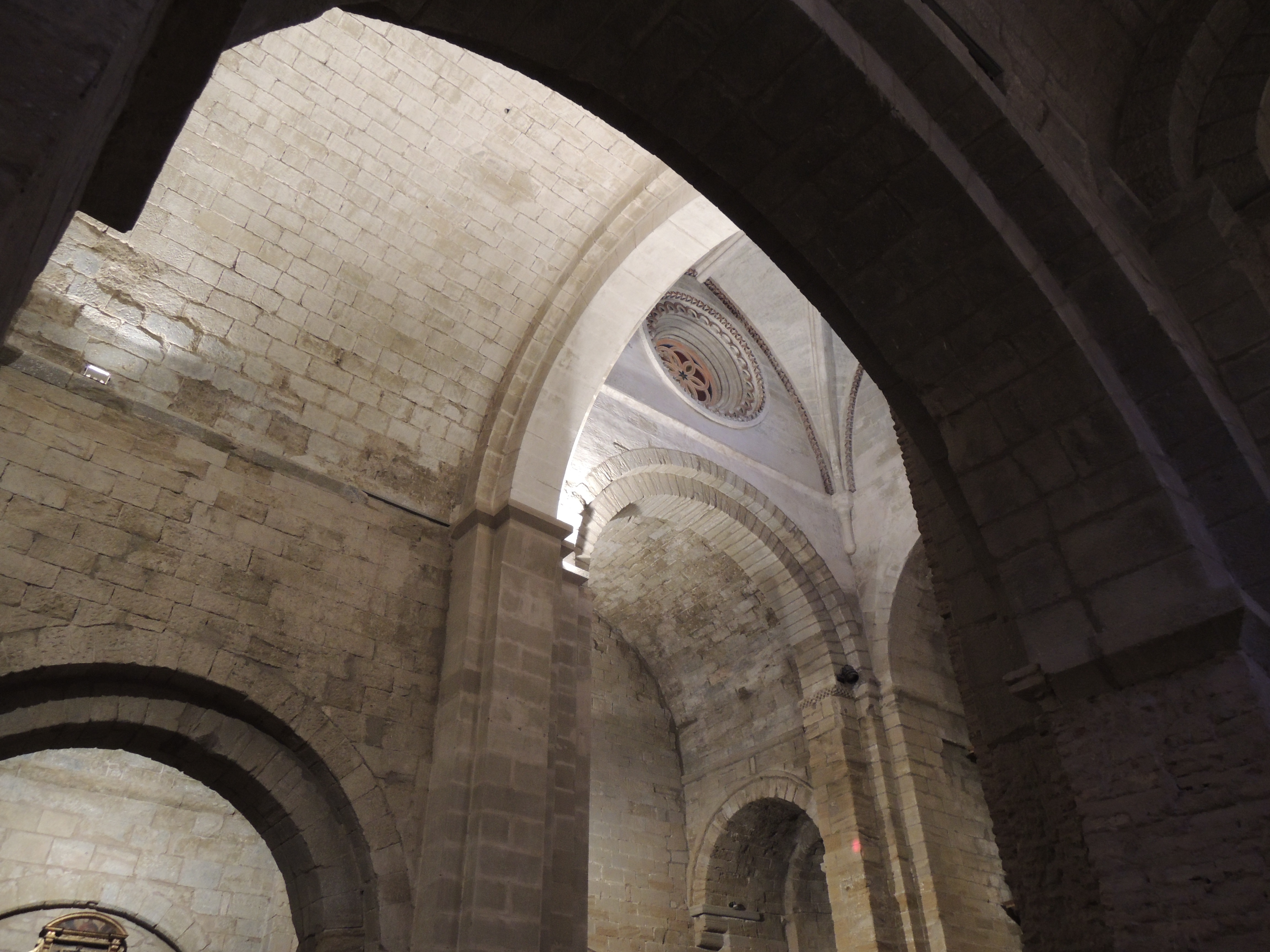
Crossing of the church

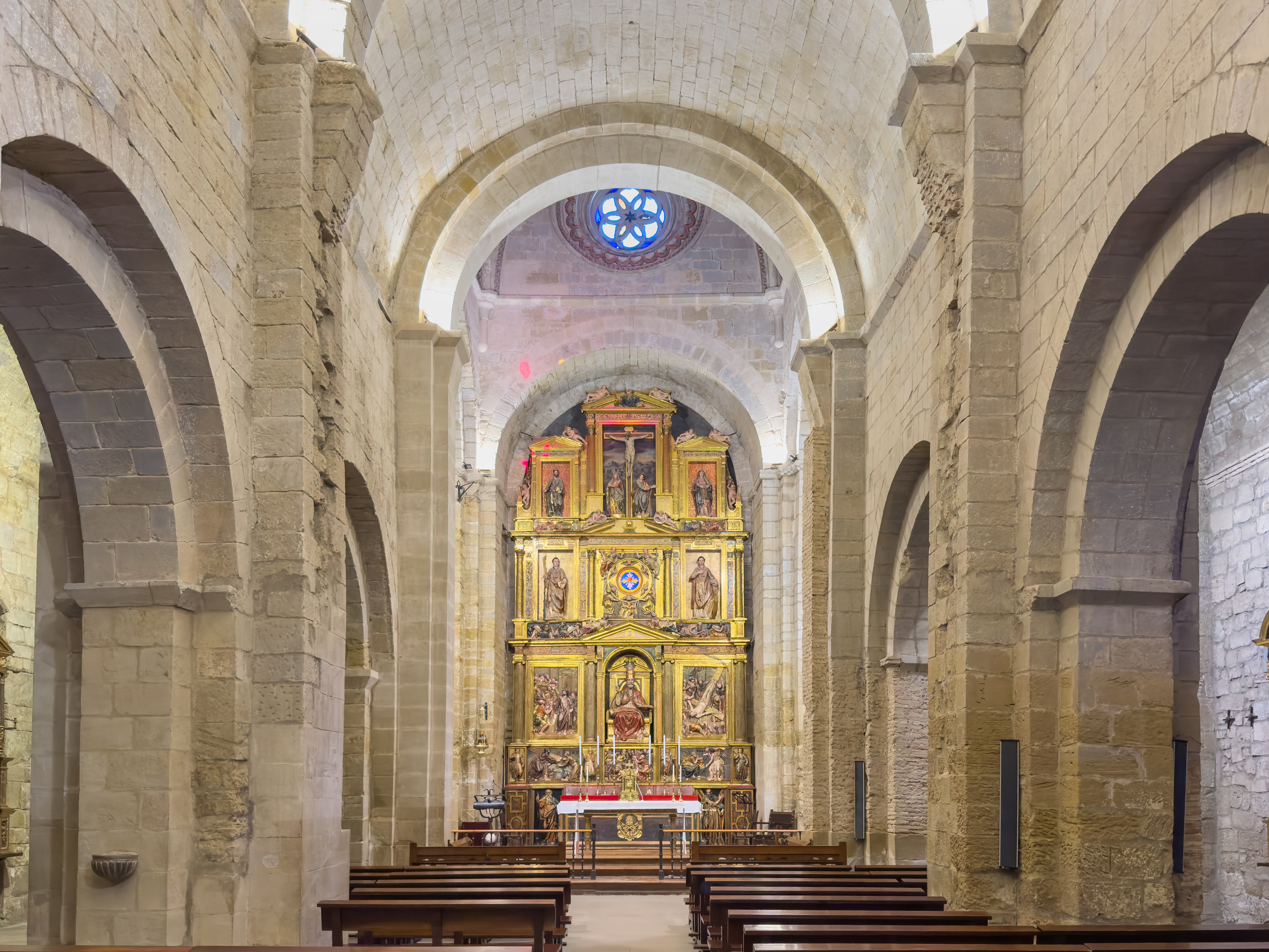
Nave of the church

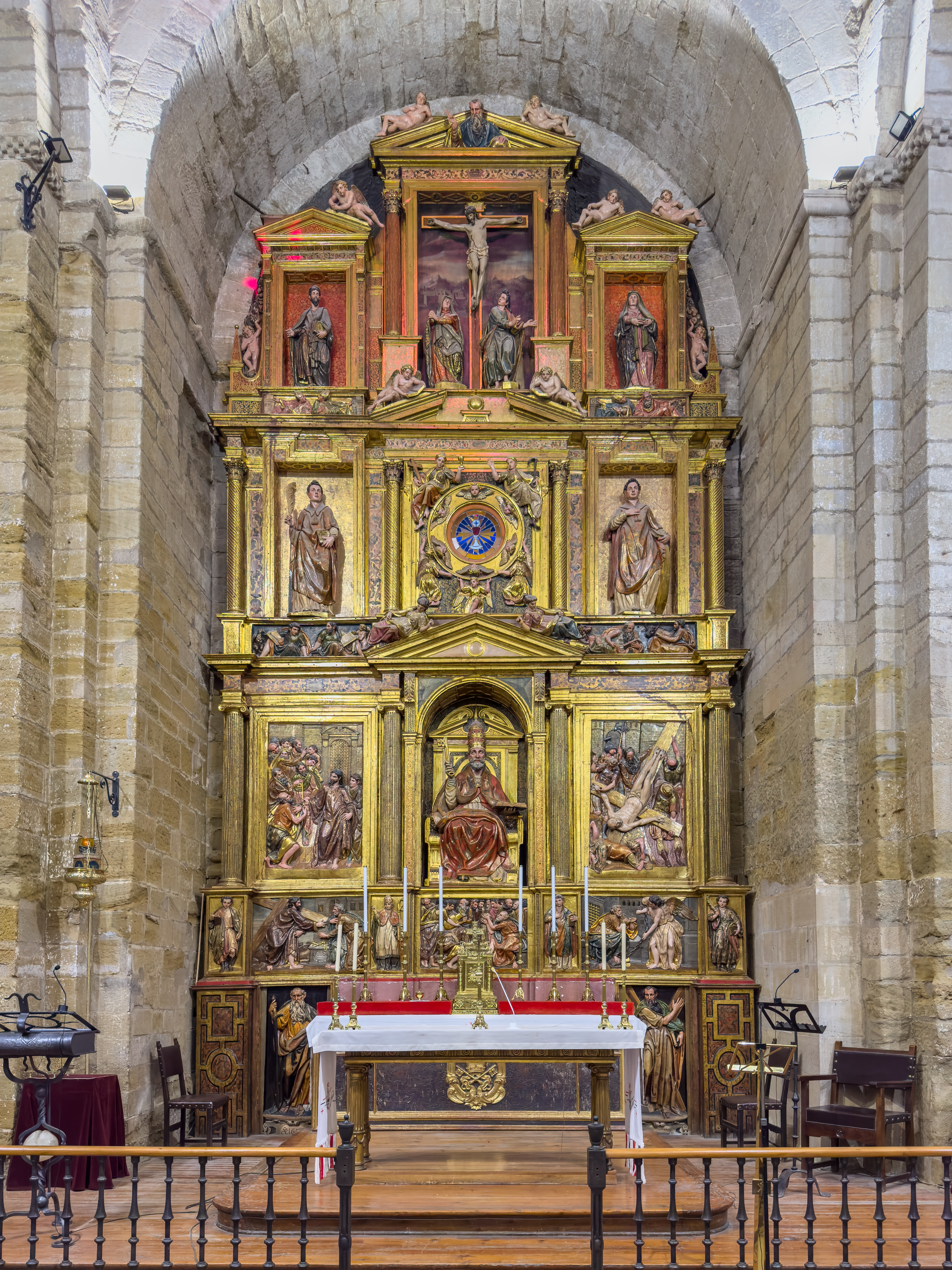
High altar (1602)

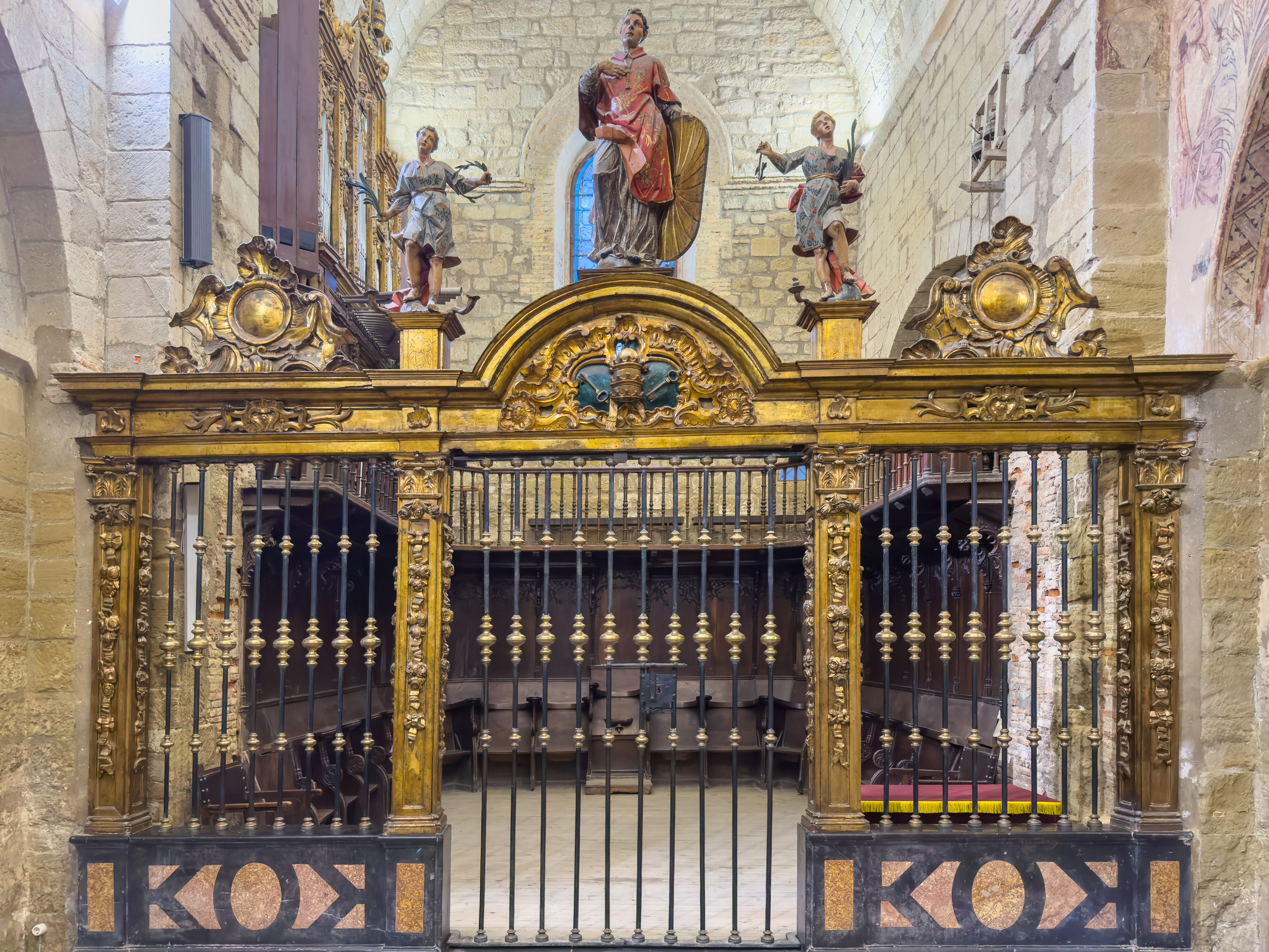
Interior

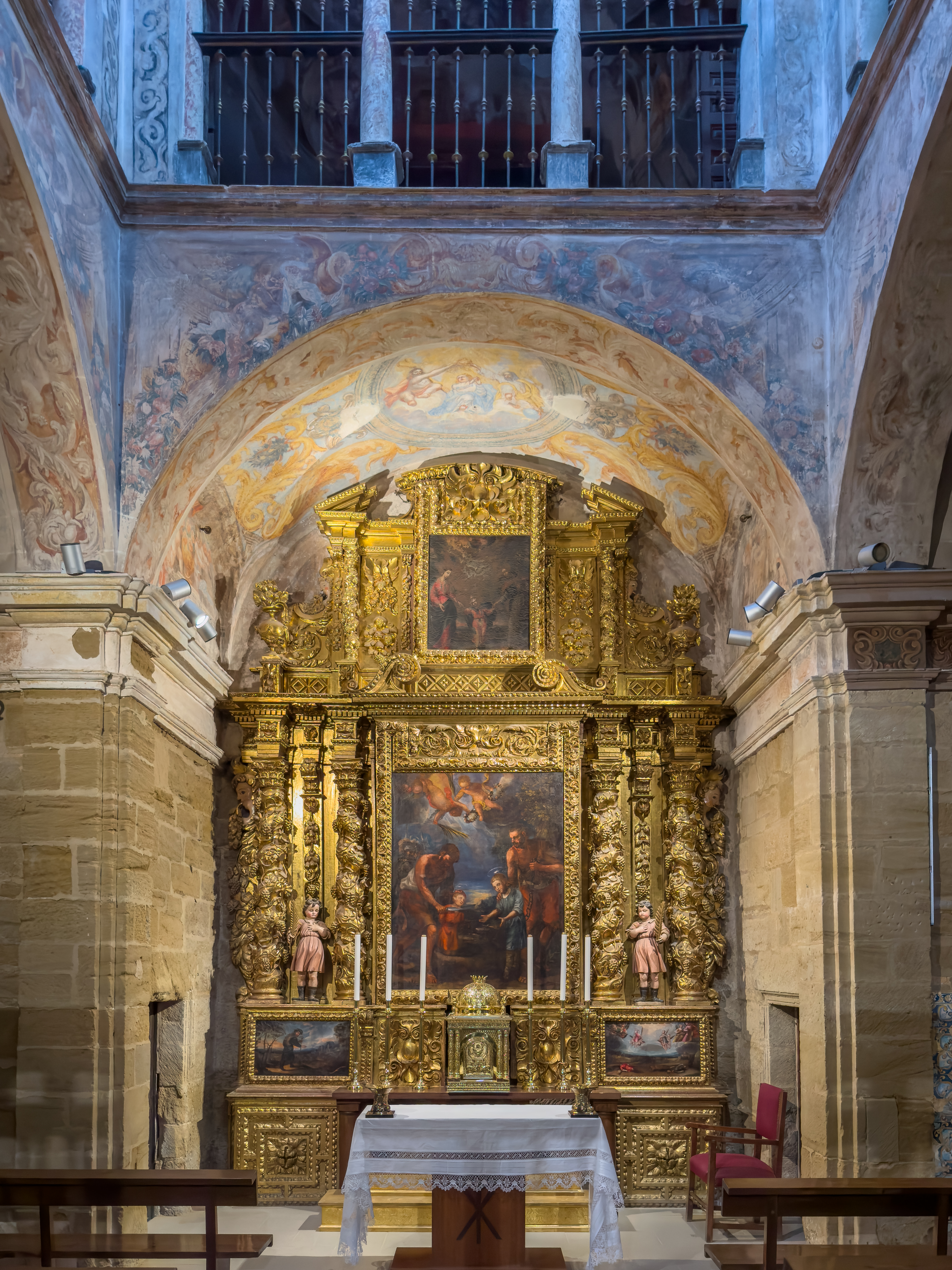
Capilla de los Santos Justo y Pastor

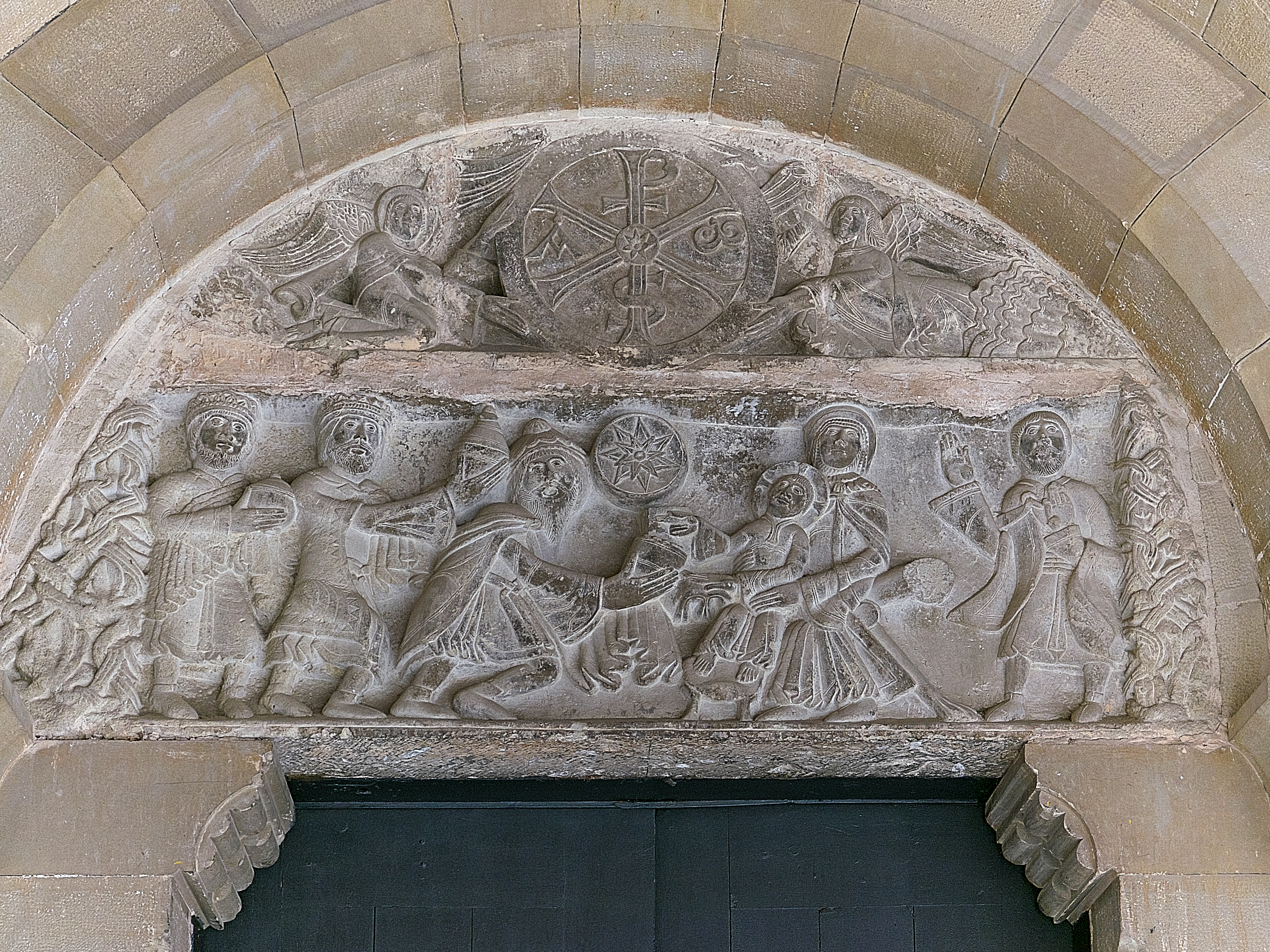
Tympanum of the portal to the cloister. Above, Chi Rho, below Epiphany

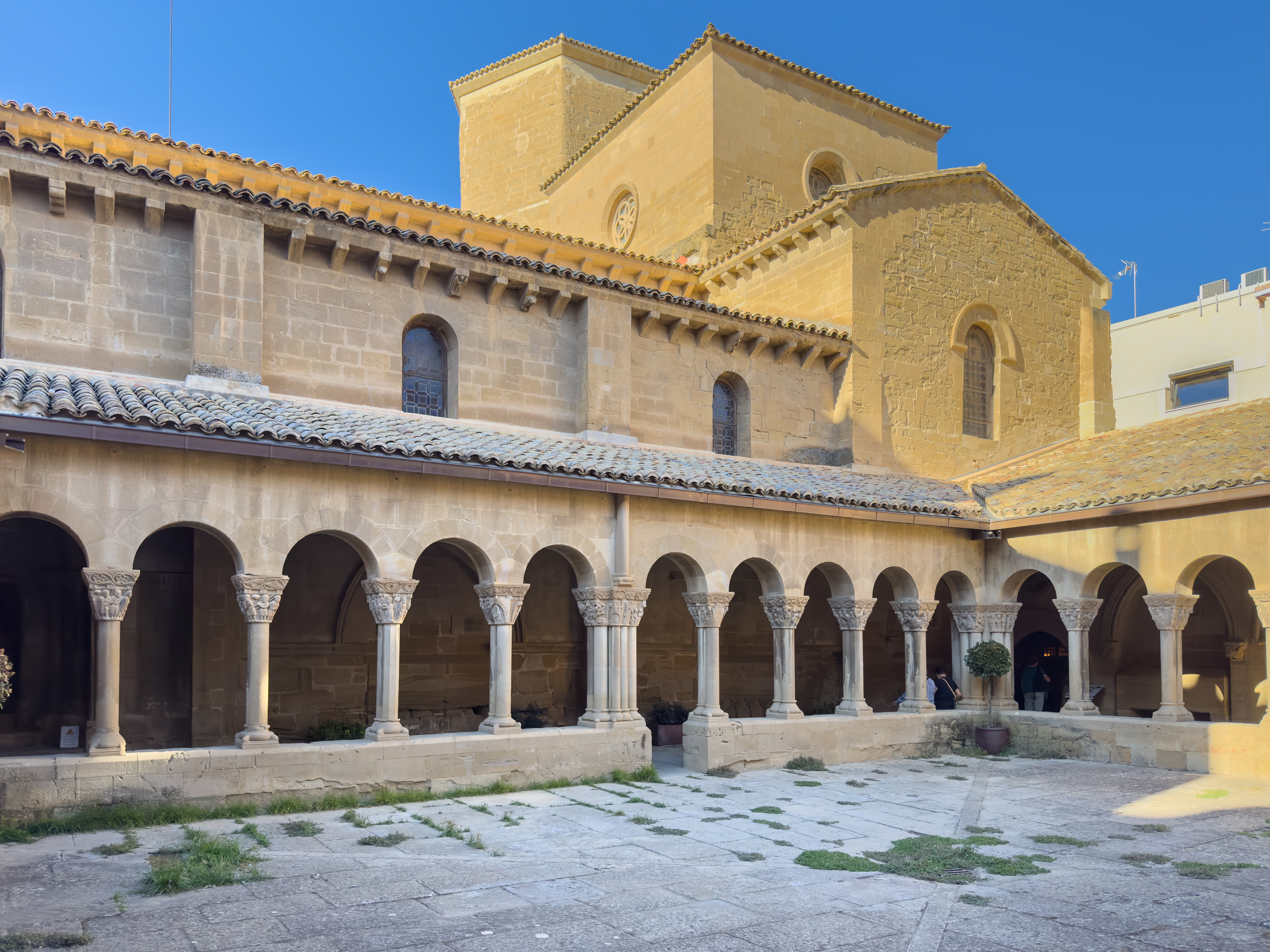
Transept of the church and north and east galleries of the cloister

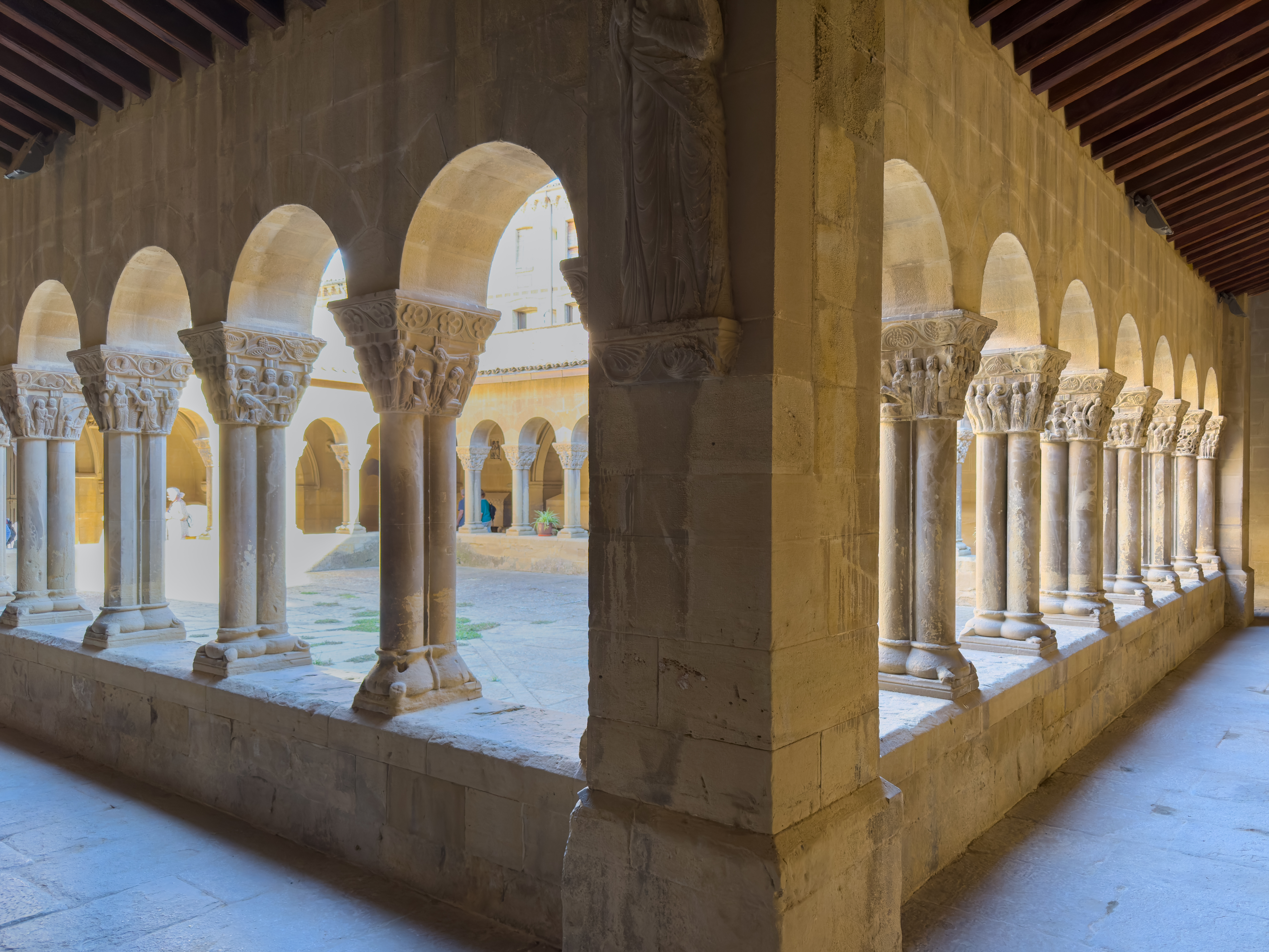
Cloister

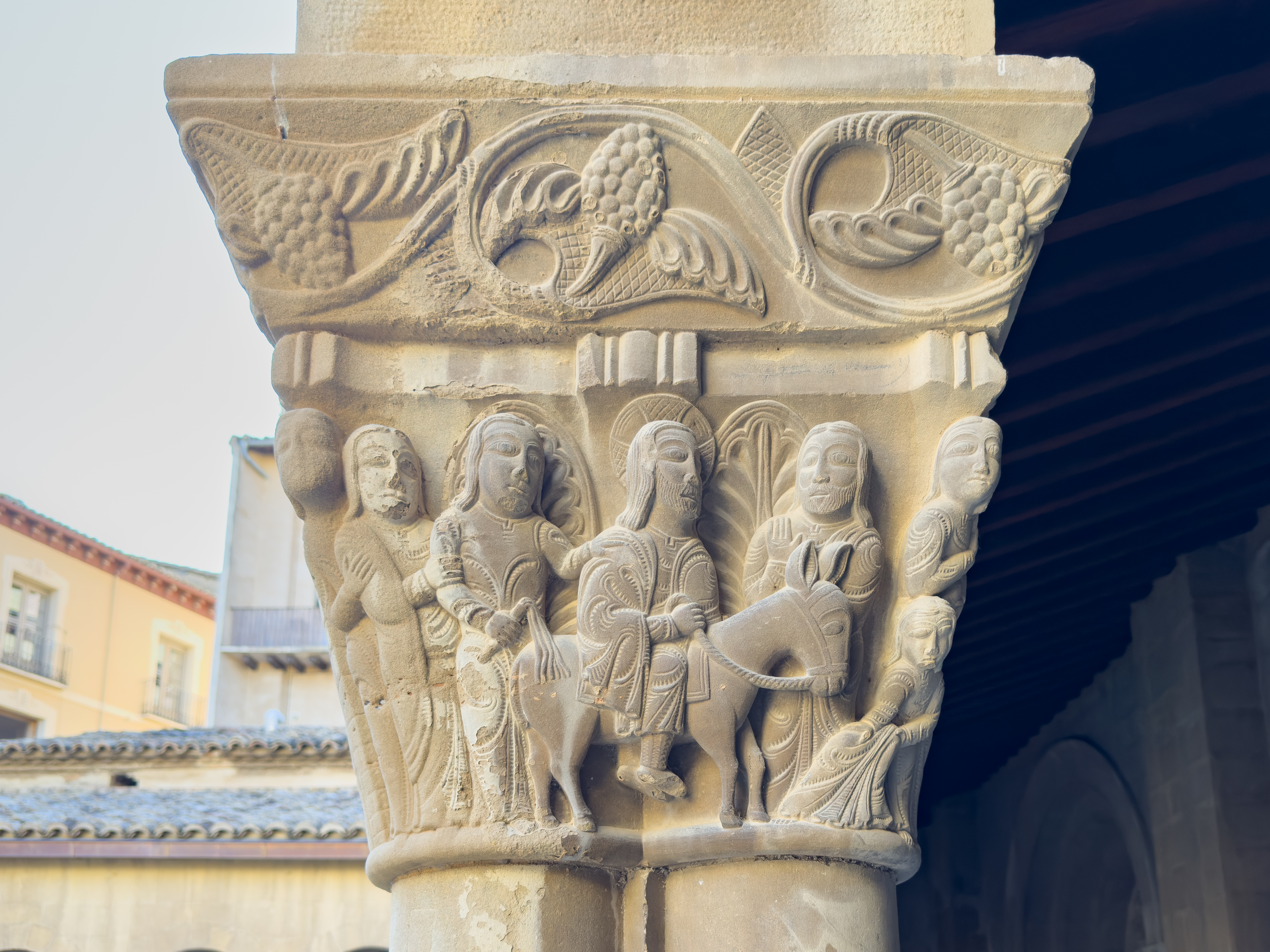
Triumphal entry into Jerusalem

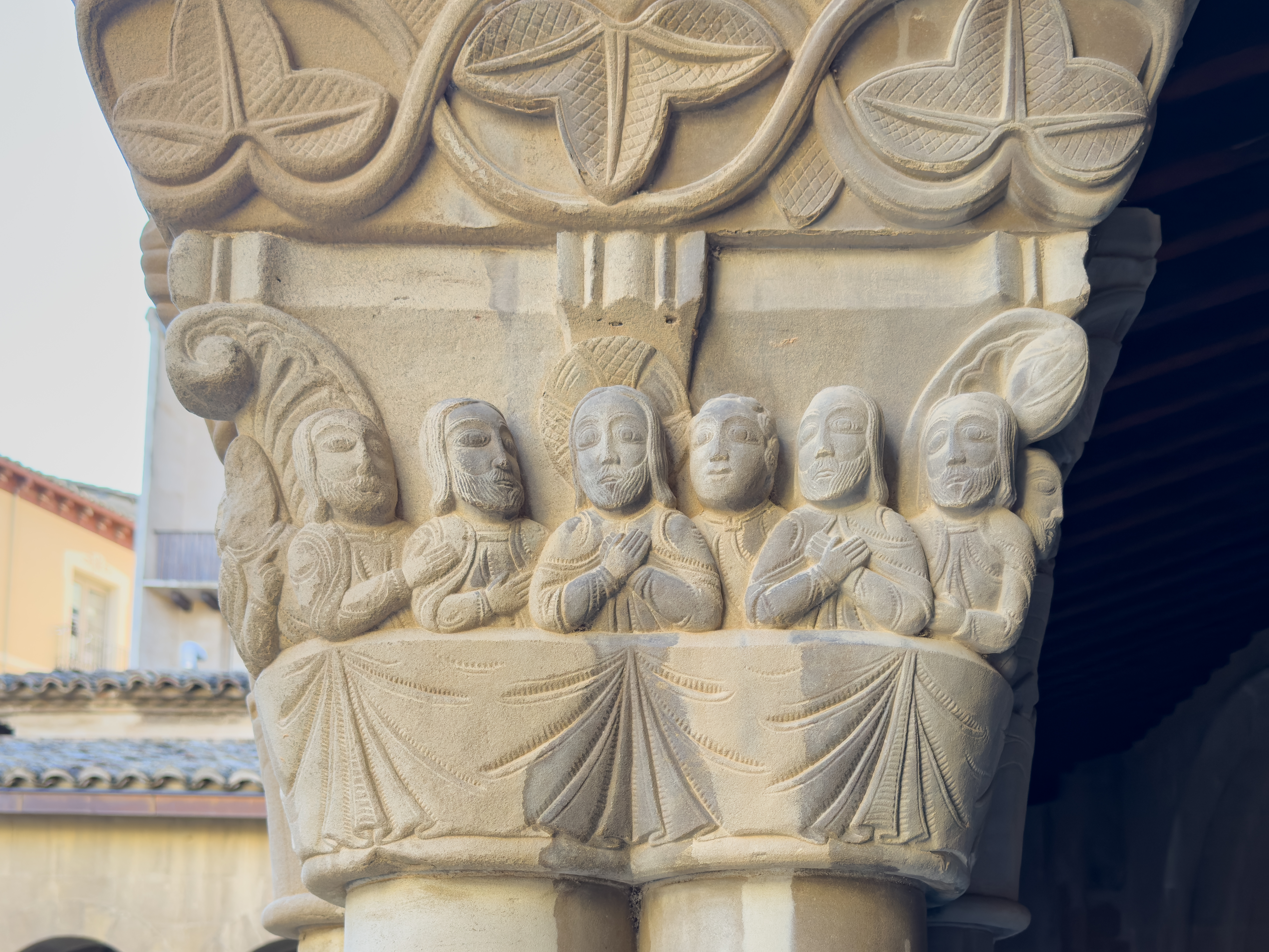
Last Supper

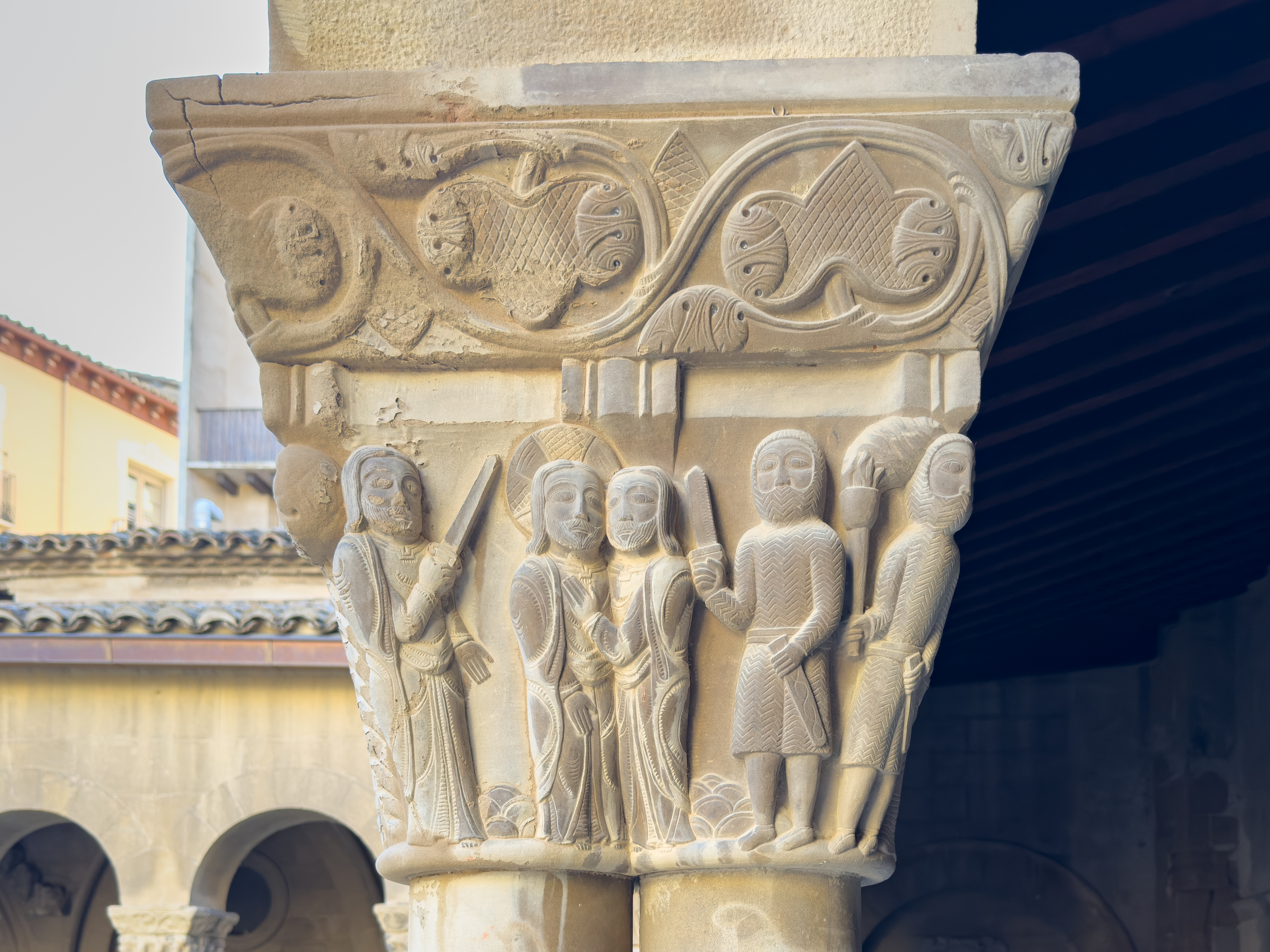
Kiss of Judas

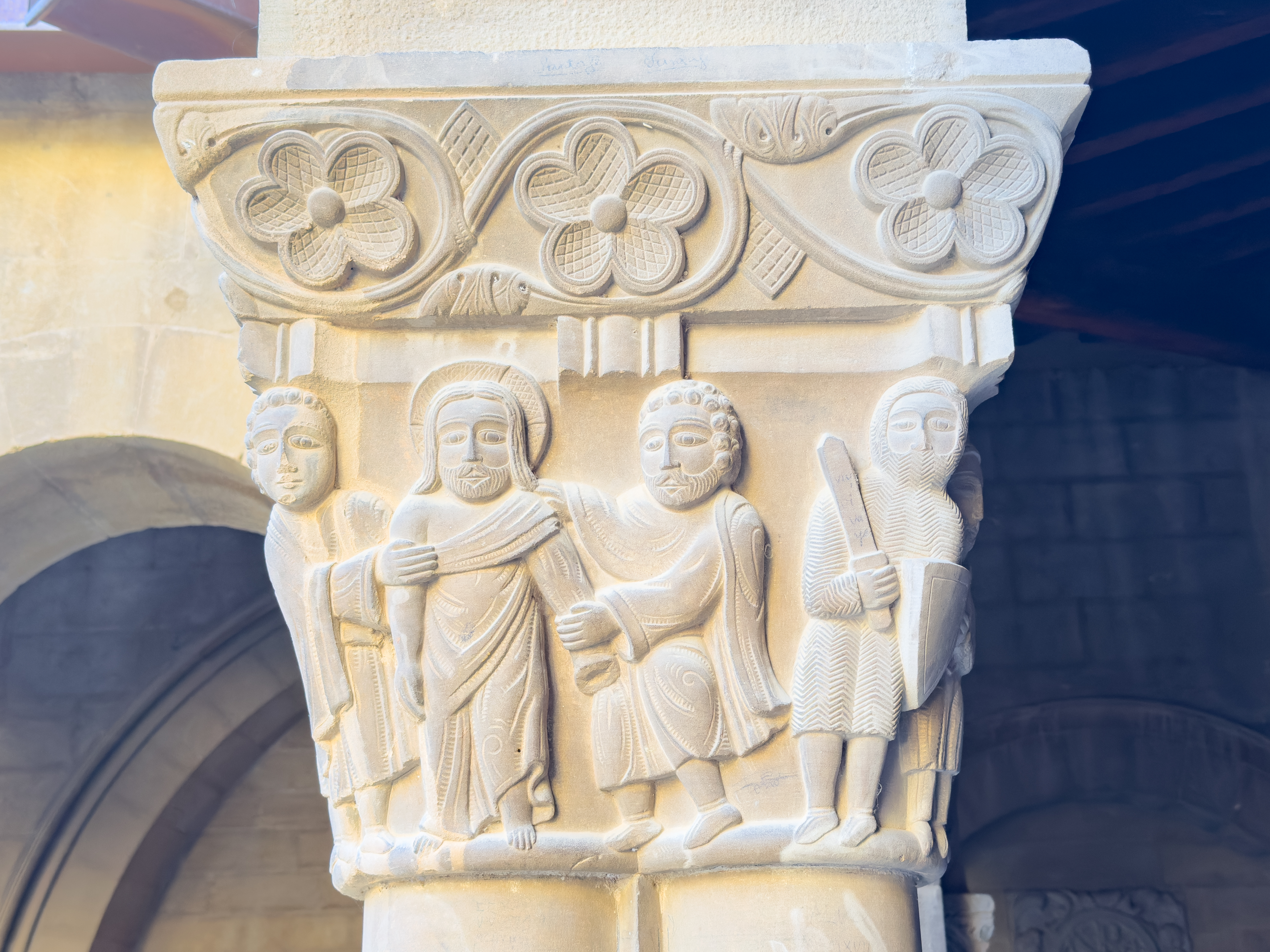
Division of the Robes

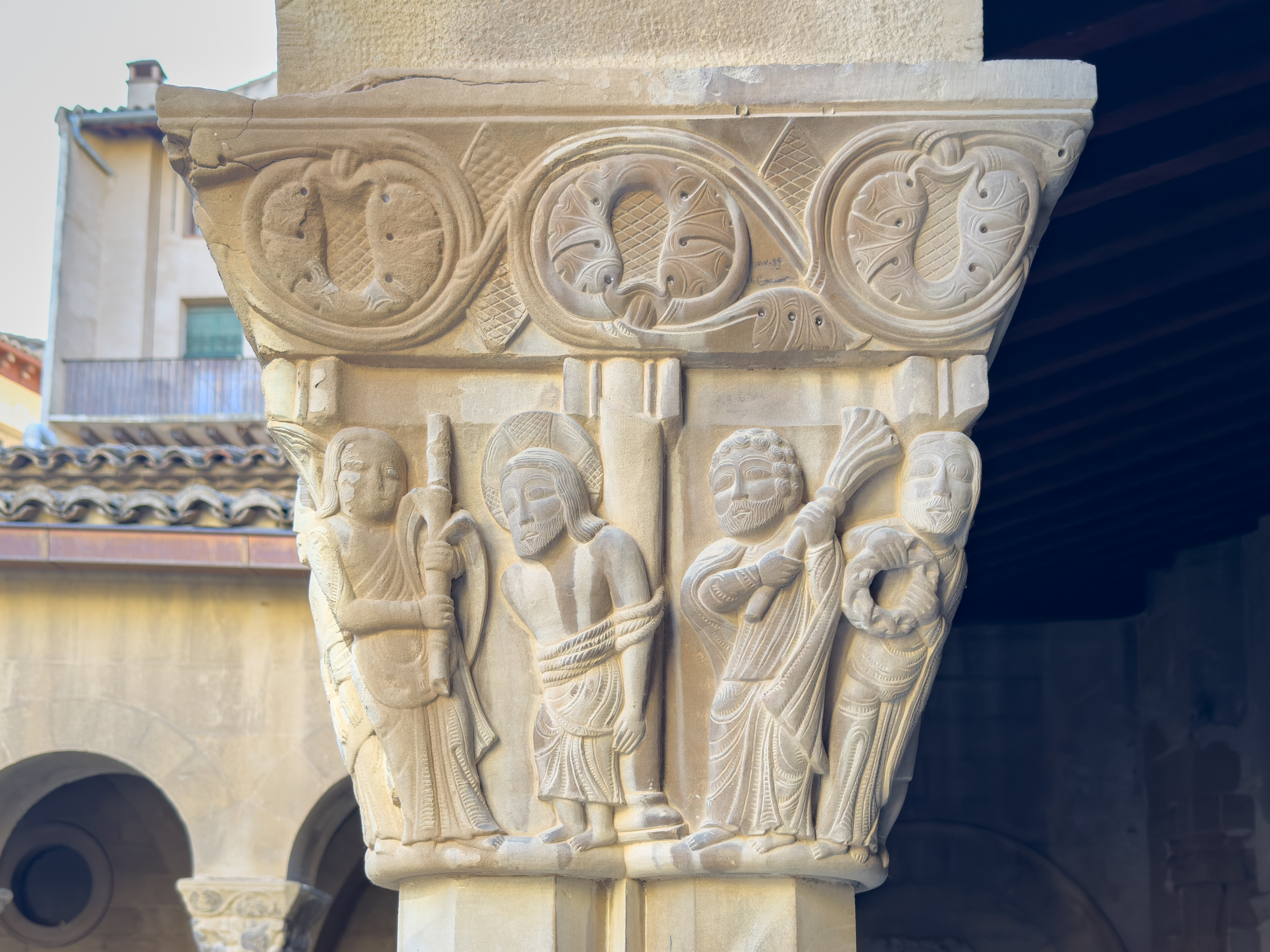
Flagellation of Christ

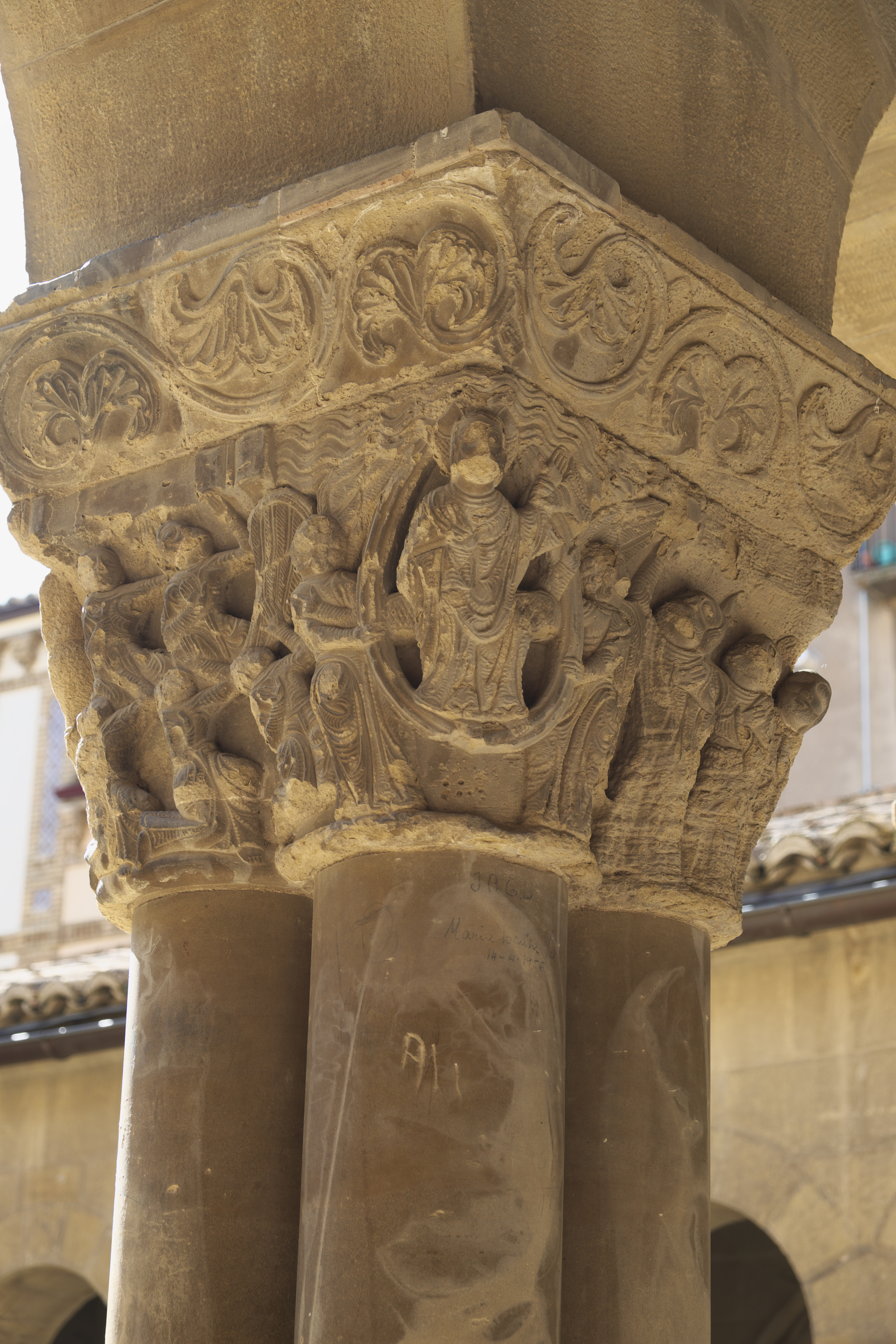
Ascension of Jesus. Galería east, capital 19

== In culture ==
Javier Sierra's novel The Invisible Fire ("El fuego invisible"), which won the Premio Planeta de Novela, featured San Pedro el Viejo prominently.

== See also ==
- Order of St. Benedict
