= Sasa del Abadiado =

- Locality
- Location within Aragon Location within Spain
- Coordinates: 42°11′7″N 0°19′41″W
- Country: Spain
- Autonomous community: Aragon
- Province: Province of Huesca
- Municipality: Loporzano
- Elevation: 606 m (1,988 ft)

Population
  - Total: 34

Sasa del Abadiado is a locality located in the municipality of Loporzano, in Huesca province, Aragon, Spain. As of 2020, it has a population of 34.

== Geography ==
Sasa del Abadiado is located 18km northeast of Huesca.
