= Los Molinos de Sipán =

- Locality
- Los Molinos
- Location within Aragon Location within Spain
- Coordinates: 42°11′10″N 0°16′9″W
- Country: Spain
- Autonomous community: Aragon
- Province: Province of Huesca
- Municipality: Loporzano
- Elevation: 585 m (1,919 ft)

Population
  - Total: 5

Los Molinos de Sipán or Los Molinos is a locality located in the municipality of Loporzano, in Huesca province, Aragon, Spain. As of 2020, it has a population of 5.

== Geography ==
Los Molinos is located 21km east-northeast of Huesca.
