= Saipan (disambiguation) =

Saipan is a Pacific island that is part of the Mariana Islands archipelago. It is one of the 14 islands that constitute the Northern Mariana Islands, an unincorporated territory of the United States.

Saipan may also refer to:

== Geography ==
- Saipan International Airport, an airport in Saipan
- Saipan International School, an international school
- Saipan Katori Shrine, a Shintō shrine
- Saipan Southern High School, a senior high school

== Military ==
- Battle of Saipan, a World War II battle
- Saipan class aircraft carrier, built by the United States Navy during World War II
  - USS Saipan (CVL-48), the lead ship of the class
- USS Saipan (LHA-2), a Tarawa-class amphibious assault ship

== Flora and fauna ==
- Saipan Jungle Fowl, a breed of chicken
- Saipan reed warbler, a critically endangered songbird

== Other uses ==
- Saipan: Conquest of the Marianas, a 1975 board wargame that simulates the World War II battle
- Saipan incident, a public falling-out between Irish football player Roy Keane and manager Mick McCarthy prior to the 2002 FIFA World Cup
- Saipan (film), a 2025 film about the Saipan incident
- Saipan Sucks, a political website

== See also ==
- Sipan (disambiguation)
