= Coscullano =

- Locality
- Location within Aragon Location within Spain
- Coordinates: 42°11′36″N 0°14′20″W
- Country: Spain
- Autonomous community: Aragon
- Province: Province of Huesca
- Municipality: Loporzano
- Elevation: 658 m (2,159 ft)

Population
  - Total: 34

Coscullano is a hamlet located in the municipality of Loporzano, in Huesca province, Aragon, Spain. As of 2020, it has a population of 34.

== Geography ==
Coscullano is located 24km east-northeast of Huesca.
