= San Julián de Banzo =

- Locality
- Location within Aragon Location within Spain
- Coordinates: 42°13′35″N 0°20′55″W
- Country: Spain
- Autonomous community: Aragon
- Province: Province of Huesca
- Municipality: Loporzano
- Elevation: 717 m (2,352 ft)

Population
  - Total: 28

San Julián de Banzo is a locality located in the municipality of Loporzano, in the Huesca province, Aragon, Spain. As of 2020, it has a population of 28.

== Geography ==
San Julián de Banzo is located 23km north-northeast of Huesca.
