= Siege of Lleida (1123) =

- Part of the Reconquista
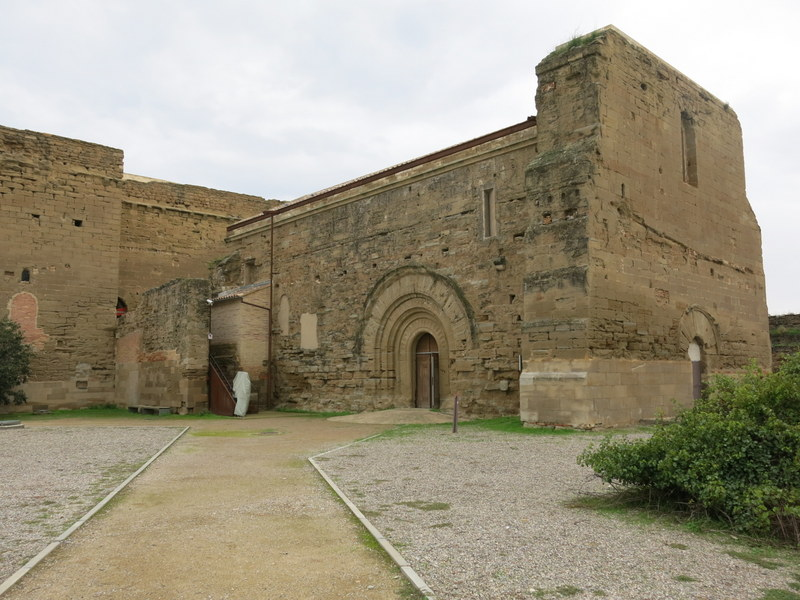
- Gardeny Castle, which was built by Alfonso the Battler to besiege Lleida.
Date	February – May 1123
Location	Lleida
Result	Almoravid victory

Belligerents
Almoravid dynasty County of Barcelona; Duchy of Aquitaine	Kingdom of Aragon

Commanders and leaders
Abu Hilal; Count of Barcelona; Duke of Aquitaine	Alfonso the Battler

The Siege of Lleida took place in 1123 when Alfonso the Battler, King of Aragón and Pamplona unsuccessfully attempted to capture the city of Lleida which was held by the Almoravids in the former Taifa of Zaragoza.

== Background ==
Following the conquest of the city of Zaragoza in 1118, Alfonso continued his campaign to take control of the Ebro River valley. Between the city of Zaragoza and the Christian County of Barcelona on the Mediterranean Sea, the territory stood as an open frontier held by the Almoravids. In that territory, the fortified city of Lleida remained under the control of the Muslims and separated the two Christian principalities. Lleida at that time had been held continuously by the Muslims for approximately four hundred years, for a period as a part of the Taifa of Zaragoza, and since 1102 by the Almoravids.

Both Alfonso and Ramon Berenguer III, Count of Barcelona desired to eventually take control of the city of Lleida and to add it to their respective domains. After the fall of the city of Zaragoza, the Muslim governor of Lleida, Abu Hilal, felt threatened by Alfonso and sought the protection of Berenguer by means of an alliance. In 1120, Abu Hilal and Berenguer entered into a pact whereby Berenguer agreed that he would defend Lleida against attack by Alfonso. In return, Abu Hilal agreed to give Berenguer the castles located at Corbins and Soses along with the payment of tribute.

After securing his western borders with the Leonese kingdom, Alfonso made plans to attack and capture the city of Lleida. This action ultimately led to a direct confrontation between Alfonso and Berenguer.

== Siege ==
In February 1123, Alfonso and his forces marched to Lleida where they build a fortification on a hill overlooking the city. The fortification became known as “Gardeny Castle” and allowed Alfonso’s army to implement a blockade of the city that included halting the flow of materials received by means of the Segre River. Although Alfonso’s tactic trapped Lleida’s inhabitants inside the city and reduced their available rations, the Almoravid defenders maintained their defensive presence and declined to surrender the city.

In the April/May timeframe, the Count of Barcelona accompanied by William IX, Duke of Aquitaine arrived in Lleida with a relief force. It was recorded that the two Christian forces did not engage in direct combat to any substantial degree. Rather than fight, historical accounts suggest that the two forces postured to demonstrate their military strength and that the Count of Barcelona positioned his troops in such a way that the continued execution of Alfonso’s siege was untenable. As a result, Alfonso ended the siege and left the environs of the city before the end of May.
