= Alfonso the Battler =

King of Aragon and Navarre from 1104 to 1134

Alfonso I
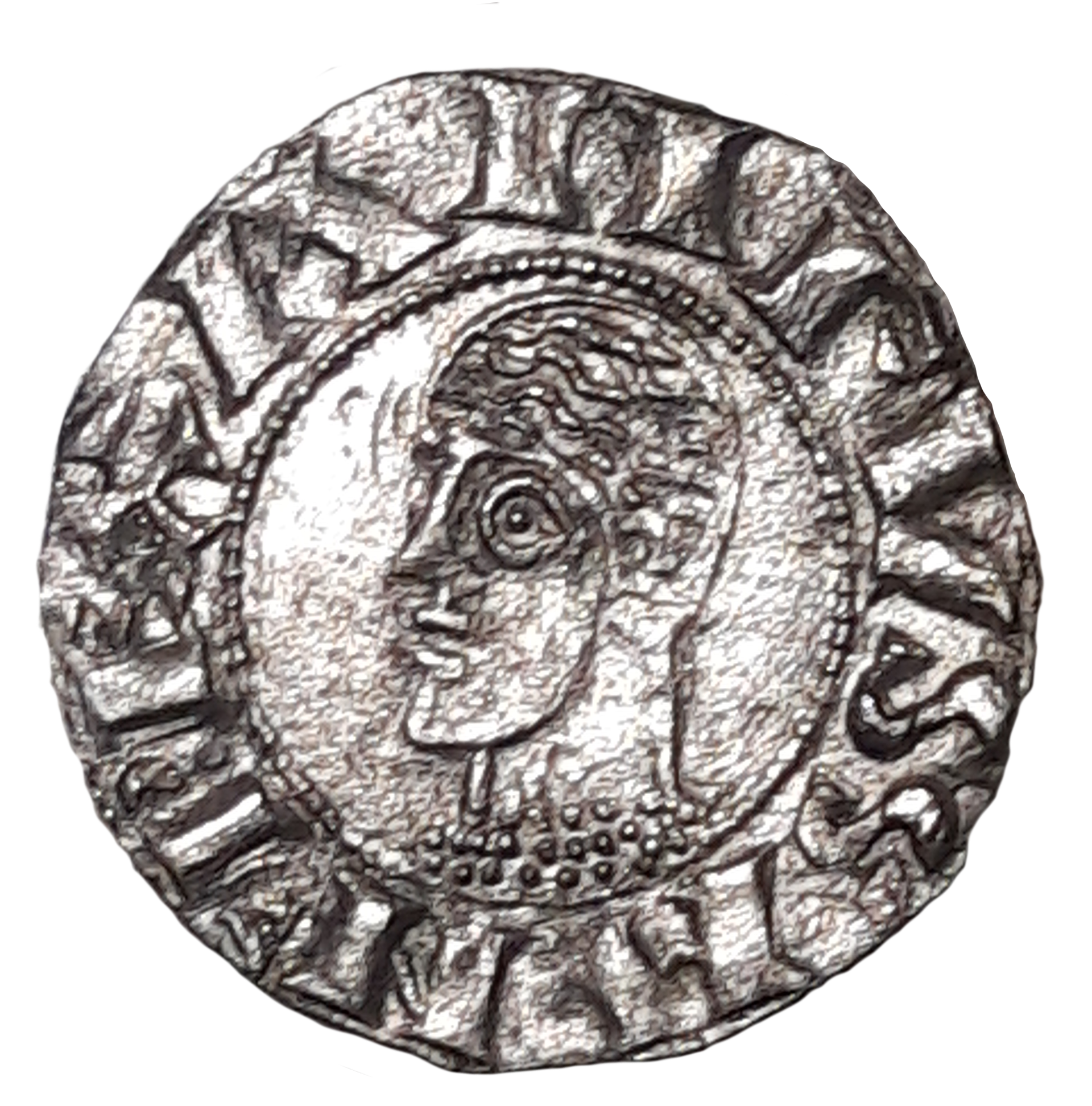
- Alfonso's Aragonese coin

King of Aragon and Navarre
- Reign: 28 September 1104 – 7 September 1134
- Predecessor: Peter I
- Successor: Ramiro II of Aragon; García Ramírez of Navarre

Emperor of All Spain
- Reign: 1109–7 September 1134
- Predecessor: Alfonso VI
- Successor: Alfonso VII
- Co-monarch: Urraca (1109–1126)
- Anti-emperor: Alfonso VII (1126–1134)
- Born: c.. 1073/1074
- Died: 7 September 1134 (aged c.. 60); Poleñino, Spain
- Burial: Abbey of San Pedro el Viejo
- Spouse: Urraca of León and Castile (m. 1109; ann. 1112)
- House: House of Jiménez
- Father: Sancho Ramírez
- Mother: Felicie de Roucy

Alfonso I (c. 1073/1074 (Note: According to the fourteenth-century Crónica de San Juan de la Peña he died in his sixty-first year) – 7 September 1134), called the Battler or the Warrior (Spanish: el Batallador), was King of Aragon and Navarre from 1104 until his death in 1134. He was the second son of King Sancho Ramírez and successor of his brother Peter I. With his marriage to Urraca, queen regnant of Castile, León and Galicia, in 1109, he began to use, with some justification, the grandiose title Emperor of Spain, formerly employed by his father-in-law, Alfonso VI. Alfonso the Battler earned his sobriquet in the Reconquista. He won his greatest military successes in the middle Ebro, where he conquered Zaragoza in 1118 and later took Ejea, Tudela, Calatayud, Borja, Tarazona, Daroca, and Monreal del Campo. He died in September 1134 after an unsuccessful battle with the Muslims at the Battle of Fraga.

Alfonso's nickname comes from the Aragonese version of the Chronicle of San Juan de la Peña (c. 1370), which says that "they called him lord Alfonso the battler because in Spain there wasn't as good a knight who won twenty-nine battles" (clamabanlo don Alfonso batallador porque en Espayna no ovo tan buen cavallero que veynte nueve batallas vençió).

== Early life ==
His earliest years were passed in the monastery of Siresa, learning to read and write and to practice the military arts under the tutelage of Lope Garcés the Pilgrim, who was repaid for his services by his former charge with the county of Pedrola when Alfonso came to the throne.

During his brother's reign, he participated in the taking of Huesca (the Battle of Alcoraz, 1096), which became the largest city in the kingdom and the new capital. He also joined El Cid's expeditions in Valencia. His father gave him the lordships of Biel, Luna, Ardenes, and Bailo.

A series of deaths put Alfonso directly in line for the throne. His brother's children, Isabella and Peter (who married María Rodríguez, daughter of El Cid), died in 1103 and 1104 respectively.

== Matrimonial conflicts ==
A passionate fighting-man (he fought twenty-nine battles against Christian or Moor), he was married (when well over 30 years and a habitual bachelor) in 1109 to the ambitious Queen Urraca of León and Castile, a passionate woman unsuited for a subordinate role. The marriage had been arranged by her father Alfonso VI of León in 1106 to unite the two chief Christian states against the Almoravids, and to supply them with a capable military leader. But Urraca was tenacious of her right as queen regnant and had not learnt chastity in the polygamous household of her father. Husband and wife quarrelled with the brutality of the age and came to open war, even placing Urraca under siege at Astorga in 1112. Alfonso had the support of one section of the nobles who found their account in the confusion. Being a much better soldier than any of his opponents he won the Battle of Candespina and the Battle of Viadangos, but his only trustworthy supporters were his Aragonese, who were not numerous enough to keep Castile and León subjugated. The marriage of Alfonso and Urraca was declared null by the pope, as they were second cousins, in 1110, but he ignored the papal nuncio and clung to his liaison with Urraca until 1114. During his marriage, he had called himself "King and Emperor of Castile, Toledo, Aragón, Pamplona, Sobrarbe, and Ribagorza" in recognition of his rights as Urraca's husband; of his inheritance of the lands of his father, including the kingdom of his great-uncle Gonzalo; and his prerogative to conquer Andalusia from the Muslims. He inserted the title of imperator on the basis that he had three kingdoms under his rule.

== Church relations ==
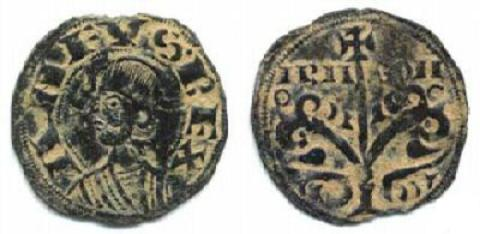
A denarius of Alfonso's, minted at Jaca, bearing his effigy and the inscription ANFUS-REX ARA-GON (Anfusus rex Aragonensium, King Alfonso of Aragon).

The king quarrelled with the church, and particularly the Cistercians, almost as violently as with his wife. As he defeated her, so he drove Archbishop Bernard into exile and replaced the abbot of Sahagún with his brother. He was finally compelled to give way in Castile and León to his stepson, Alfonso VII of Castile, son of Urraca and her first husband. The intervention of Pope Calixtus II brought about an arrangement between the old man and his young namesake.

In 1122 in Belchite, he founded a confraternity of knights to fight against the Almoravids. It was the start of the military orders in Aragon. Years later, he organised a branch of the Militia Christi of the Holy Land at Monreal del Campo.

== Military expansion ==
Alfonso spent his first four years as king in near-constant war with the Muslims. In 1105, he conquered Ejea and Tauste and refortified Castellar and Juslibol. In 1106, he defeated Ahmad II al-Musta'in of Zaragoza at Valtierra. In 1107, he took Tamarite de Litera and San Esteban de Litera. Then followed a period dominated by his relations with Castile and León through his wife, Urraca. He resumed his conquests in 1117 with Fitero, Corella, Cintruénigo, Murchante, Monteagudo, and Cascante.

In 1118, the Council of Toulouse declared a crusade to assist in the conquest of Zaragoza. Many Frenchmen consequently joined Alfonso at Ayerbe. They took Almudévar, Gurrea de Gállego, and Zuera, besieging Zaragoza itself by the end of May. The city fell on 18 December, and the forces of Alfonso occupied the Azuda, the government tower. The great palace of the city was given to the monks of Bernard. Promptly, the city was made Alfonso's capital. Two years later, in 1120, he defeated a Muslim army intent on reconquering his new capital at the Battle of Cutanda. He promulgated the fuero of tortum per tortum, facilitating taking the law into one's own hands, which among others reassumed the Muslim right to dwell in the city and their right to keep their properties and practice their religion under their own jurisdiction as long as they maintained tax payment and relocated to the suburbs.

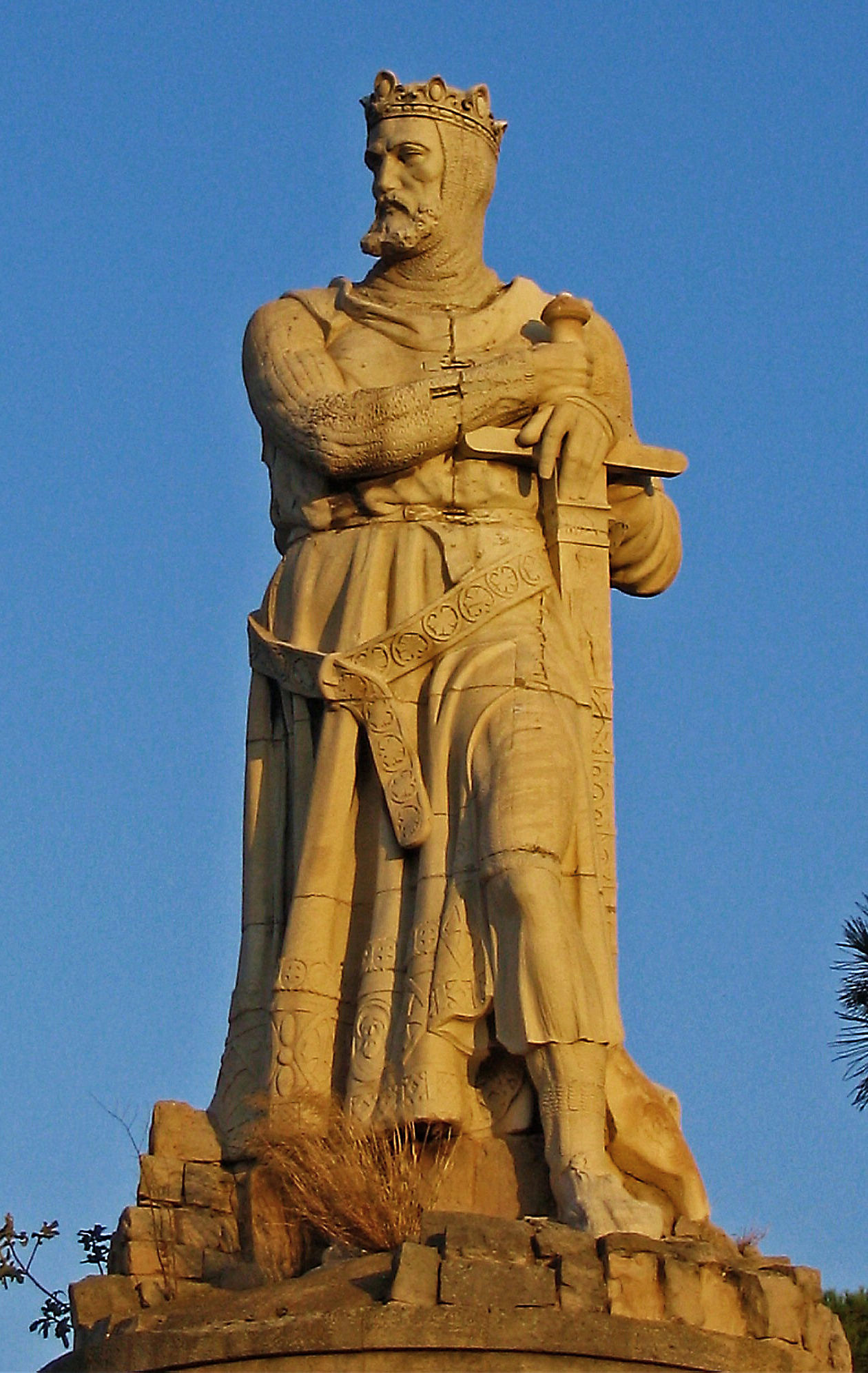
Modern statue of Alfonso as a warrior in the Parque Grande José Antonio Labordeta, Zaragoza

In 1119, he retook Cervera, Tudejen, Castellón, Tarazona, Ágreda, Magallón, Borja, Alagón, Novillas, Mallén, Rueda, Épila and populated the region of Soria. He began the siege of Calatayud, but left to defeat the army at Cutanda trying to retake Zaragoza. When Calatayud fell, he took Bubierca, Alhama de Aragón, Ariza, and Daroca (1120). In 1123, he besieged Lleida, which was in the hands of the count of Barcelona. From the winter of 1124 to September 1125, he was on a risky expedition to Peña Cadiella deep in Andalusia.

In the great raid of 1125, he carried away a large part of the subject Christians from Granada, and in the south-west of France, he had rights as king of Navarre. From 1125 to 1126, he was on campaign against Granada, where he was trying to install a Christian prince, and Córdoba, where he got only as far as Motril. In 1127, he reconquered Longares, but simultaneously lost all his Castilian possessions to Alfonso VII. He confirmed a treaty with Castile the next year (1128) with the Peace of Támara, which fixed the boundaries of the two realms.

He conquered Molina de Aragón and populated Monzón in 1129, before besieging Valencia, which had fallen again upon the Cid's death.

He went north of the Pyrenées in October 1130 to protect the Val d'Aran. Early in 1131, he besieged Bayonne. It is said he ruled "from Belorado to Pallars and from Bayonne to Monreal."

At the siege of Bayonne in October 1131, three years before his death, he published a will leaving his kingdom to three autonomous religious orders based in Palestine and politically largely independent – the Knights Templars, the Hospitallers, and the Knights of the Holy Sepulchre, whose influences might have been expected to cancel one another out. The will has puzzled some historians, who have read it as an unusual gesture of extreme piety, though not out of line with his purported devotion for militant Christianity. Elena Lourie (1975) suggested instead that it was Alfonso's attempt to neutralize the papacy's interest in a disputed succession – Aragon had been a fief of the papacy since 1068 – and to fend off Urraca's son from her first marriage, Alfonso VII of Castile, for the papacy would be bound to press the terms of such a pious testament. (Note: Pope Innocent II indeed did write Alfonso VII to just this effect, 10 June 1135 or 1136.) Generous bequests to important churches and abbeys in Castile had the effect of making the noble churchmen there beneficiaries who would be encouraged by the will to act as a brake on Alfonso VII's ambitions to break it – and yet among the magnates witnessing the will in 1131 there was not a single cleric. In the event it was a will that his nobles refused to carry out – instead bringing his brother Ramiro from the monastery to assume royal powers – an eventuality that Lourie suggests was Alfonso's hidden intent.

His final campaigns were against Mequinenza (1133) and Fraga (1134), where García Ramírez, the future king of Navarre, and a mere 500 other knights fought with him. It fell on 17 July. He was dead by September. His tomb is in the monastery of San Pedro in Huesca.

== Death ==
=== Succession ===
A box (reliquary) containing the bones (relics) of Alfonso the Battler, with the skull centre, facing the viewer. Photograph by Enrique Capella (May 1920).

The testament of Alfonso leaving his kingdom to the three orders was dismissed out of hand by the nobility of his kingdoms, and possible successors were sought. Alfonso's only brother, Ramiro, had been a Benedictine monk since childhood, and his commitment to the church, his temperament and vow of celibacy made him ill-suited to rule a kingdom under constant military threat and in need of a stable line of succession. The step-son of the deceased king, Alfonso VII of León, as reigning monarch and legitimate descendant of Sancho III of Navarre, put himself forward but garnered no local support. The nobility of Navarre aligned behind Pedro de Atarés, the grandson of Alfonso's illegitimate uncle, while the Aragonese nobility rallied around the abbot-bishop Ramiro. A convention was called at Borja in order to develop a consensus. Pedro de Atarés had so alienated his own partisans there with his perceived arrogance that they had abandoned him, yet at the same time were unwilling to accept Alfonso's younger brother Ramiro. The convention then broke up without ever arriving at a compromise, and the two regional factions proceeded to act independently.

The choice of the Navarrese lords fell on García Ramírez, Lord of Monzón, descendant of an illegitimate son of García Sánchez III and protégé of Alfonso VII to be their king. The Aragonese took Ramiro out of a monastery and made him king, marrying him without papal dispensation to Agnes, sister of the Duke of Aquitaine, then betrothing their newborn daughter to Ramon Berenguer IV, Count of Barcelona, who was then named Ramiro's heir. "The result of the crisis produced by the result of Alfonso I's will was a major reorientation of the peninsula's kingdoms: the separation of Aragon and Navarre, the union of Aragon and Catalonia and – a moot point but stressed particularly by some Castilian historians – the affirmation of 'Castilian hegemony' in Spain" by the rendering of homage for Zaragoza by Alfonso's eventual heir, Ramon Berenguer IV of Barcelona.

=== Pseudo-Alfonso the Battler ===
Sometime during the reign of Alfonso II of Aragon, the Battler's grandnephew, a man came forward claiming to be Alfonso the Battler. The only contemporary references to this event are two letters of Alfonso II addressed to Louis VII of France; they were carried to Louis by Berengar, the Bishop of Lleida, but are not dated. According to the second of these, the pretender was then living in Louis's domains, meaning the Principality of Catalonia, which was ruled by Alfonso under Louis's suzerainty. This pretender was an old man (appropriately, since the Battler had died some decades earlier) and Alfonso II expressed confidence that Louis would arrest him at the earliest possible moment and bring him to justice. The first letter supplies sufficient information to date it approximately, since the Bishop sojourned at the court of Louis on his way to Rome. It is known from other sources that Berengar attended the Third Lateran Council in March 1179. The letters were probably written towards the end of 1178 or in January 1179 at the latest. According to an annalist source for the years 1089–1196, the pretender was received with honour and pomp in Zaragoza, Calatayud, and Daroca, which the Battler had conquered, but after it was found out that he was false he was executed before the city of Barcelona in 1181. Modern historian Antonio Ubieto Arteta has hypothesised that the Aragonese lords of the tenancies of Zaragoza, Calatayud, and Daroca – Pedro de Luesia, Loferrench de Luna, Pedro de Castillazuelo (lord of Calatayud), Pedro Cornel (lord of Murillo de Gállego), and the majordomo Jimeno de Artusilla, all of whom disappear between 1177 and 1181 in the documentation of their tenancies – supported, at least initially, the pretender. These lords also appear in the later legend of the Bell of Huesca, which has no historical basis, as the victims of Ramiro II (1136). Since, historically, they were not active in the 1130s, it is possible that the historically based legend of the pseudo-Alfonso had some influence on the genesis of the Bell of Huesca.

The earliest chronicle source for the imposture is Rodrigo Jiménez de Rada, writing in the middle of the thirteenth century, who records that there were several legends then current about the death of Alfonso the Battler: some believed he perished in the battle of Fraga, some that his body had never been recovered, others that he was buried in the monastery of Montearagón, and still others that he had fled from Fraga in shame after his defeat and became a pilgrim as an act of penance. Some years later, Rodrigo writes, though he does not give a year, an impostor arose and was received by many as the Battler, though Alfonso II had him arrested and hanged. This is the earliest reference to the impostor's end. The legend was amplified in later years. According to the fourteenth-century Crónica de los Estados Peninsulares, the Battler went on a pilgrimage to Jerusalem, where he lived for many years. The Crónica de San Juan de la Peña also recounts the incident, but it depends entirely on Rodrigo and the Estados Peninsulares. It is not until the seventeenth-century historian Jerónimo Zurita penned his Anales de la Corona de Aragón that new details were added to the legend. Zurita dates the impostor's appearance to the death of Raymond Berengar IV of Barcelona, who had been exercising power in Aragon, and the succession of the child Alfonso II in 1162. The death of the impostor, by hanging, must have occurred in 1163.

== Competitors for succession ==
Candidates to succeed Alfonso the Battler

Muniadona of Castile	Sancho III of Pamplona	Sancha of Aybar
Stephanie of Barcelona	García; Sánchez III of Pamplona	(mistress)	Ferdinand I of León	Garsendis of Foix	Ramiro I of Aragon	Amuña
Sancho IV of Navarre	Sancho; Garcés of Uncastillo	Alfonso VI of León and Castile	Felicia of Roucy	Sancho; Ramírez of Navarre and Aragon	Isabella of Urgell	Sancho; Ramírez; Count of Ribagorza
Ramiro; Sánchez of Monzón	Urraca of León and Castile	Alfonso the Battler	Ramiro II of Aragon	Peter I of Navarre and Aragon	García; Sánchez of Atarés
García; Ramírez of Navarre	Alfonso VII of León and Castile	Petronilla of Aragon	Ramon; Berenguer IV; Count of Barcelona	Peter of Atarés

Candidates for the crowns of Navarre and Aragon in 1134
Marriage and legitimate descent
Liaison and illegitimate descent

== Sources ==
- Constable, Olivia Remie; Zurro, Damian, eds. (2012). "Grants to Military Christian Orders". Medieval Iberia: Readings from Christian, Muslim, and Jewish Sources. Translated by Brodman, James W. University of Pennsylvania Press. pp. 203–208.
- Lacarra, José María (1978). Alfonso el Batallador. Guara Editorial.
- Lourie, Elena (1975). "The Will of Alfonso I, El Batallador, King of Aragon and Navarre: A Reassessment". Speculum. 50:4 October (4): 635–651. doi:10.2307/2855471. JSTOR 2855471. S2CID 159659007.
- Reilly, Bernard F. (1995). The Contest of Christian and Muslim Spain, 1031-1157. Blackwell.
- Ubieto Arteta, Antonio. "La aparición del falso Alfonso I el Batallador." Argensola, 38 (1958), 29–38.

Regnal titles
Preceded by Peter I	King of Aragon; 1104–1134	Succeeded by Ramiro II
Preceded by Peter I	King of Navarre; 1104–1134	Succeeded by García Ramírez
Preceded by Alfonso VI of León and Castile	Emperor of All Spain; 1109–1134 with Urraca of León (1109–1126); Alfonso VII (1126–1134)	Succeeded by Alfonso VII of León and Castile
