= Chibluco =

- Locality
- Location within Aragon Location within Spain
- Coordinates: 42°12′43″N 0°21′28″W
- Country: Spain
- Autonomous community: Aragon
- Province: Province of Huesca
- Municipality: Loporzano
- Elevation: 684 m (2,244 ft)

Population
  - Total: 31

Chibluco is a locality located in the municipality of Loporzano, in Huesca province, Aragon, Spain. As of 2020, it has a population of 31.

== Geography ==
Chibluco is located 22km north-northeast of Huesca.
