= Barluenga =

- Locality
- Location within Aragon Location within Spain
- Coordinates: 42°11′59″N 0°20′17″W
- Country: Spain
- Autonomous community: Aragon
- Province: Province of Huesca
- Municipality: Loporzano
- Elevation: 671 m (2,201 ft)

Population
  - Total: 40

Barluenga is a locality located in the municipality of Loporzano, in Huesca province, Aragon, Spain. As of 2020, it has a population of 40.

== Geography ==
Barluenga is located 19km northeast of Huesca.
