= Aguas (Huesca) =

- Locality
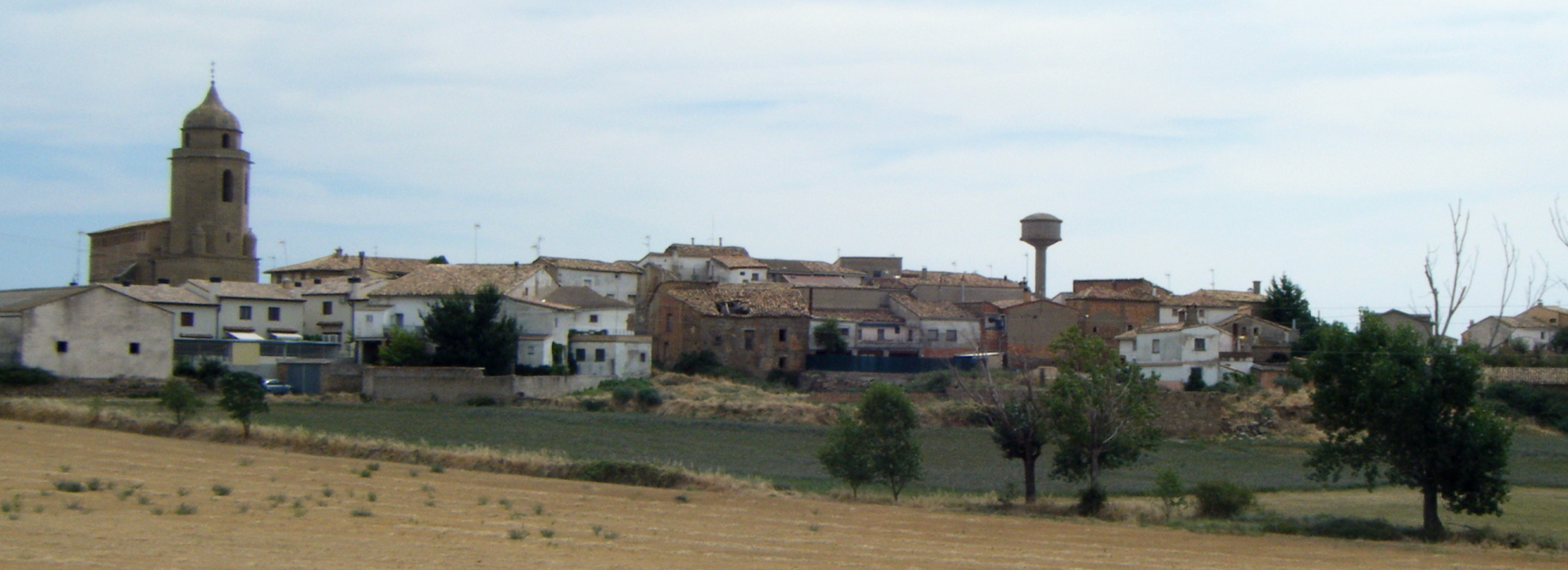

- Location within Aragon Location within Spain
- Coordinates: 42°12′4″N 0°12′32″W
- Country: Spain
- Autonomous community: Aragon
- Province: Province of Huesca
- Municipality: Loporzano
- Elevation: 701 m (2,300 ft)

Population
  - Total: 32

Aguas is a locality located in the municipality of Loporzano, in Huesca province, Aragon, Spain. As of 2020, it has a population of 32.

== Geography ==
Aguas is located 29km east-northeast of Huesca.
