= Vadiello =

- Locality
- Location within Aragon Location within Spain
- Coordinates: 42°14′17″N 0°16′55″W
- Country: Spain
- Autonomous community: Aragon
- Province: Province of Huesca
- Municipality: Loporzano
- Elevation: 751 m (2,464 ft)

Population
  - Total: 0

Vadiello is a locality located in the municipality of Loporzano, in Huesca province, Aragon, Spain. As of 2020, it has a population of 0.

== Geography ==
Vadiello is located 28km northeast of Huesca.
