= Santa Eulalia la Mayor =

- Locality
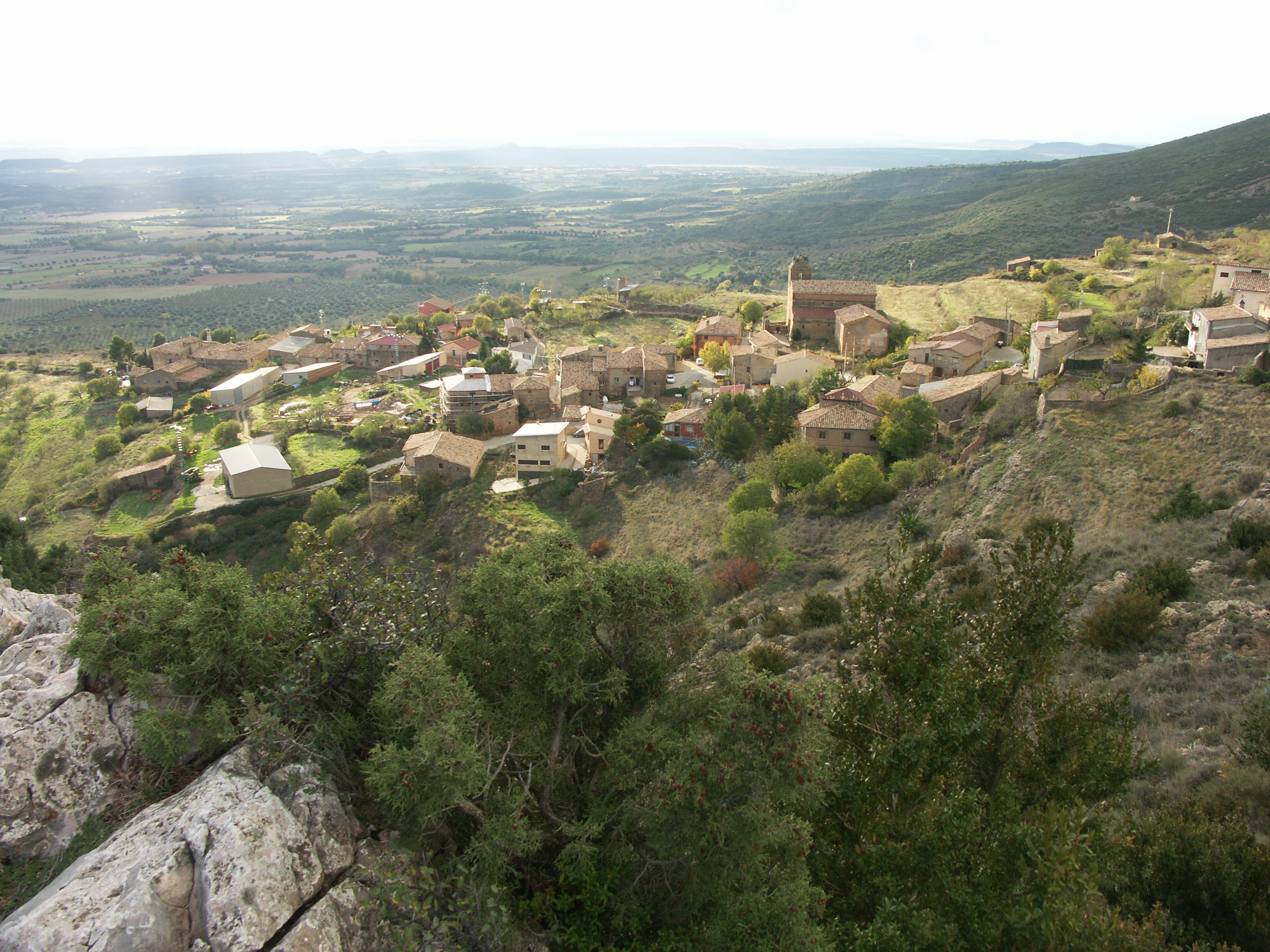

- Location within Aragon Location within Spain
- Coordinates: 42°12′41″N 0°17′45″W
- Country: Spain
- Autonomous community: Aragon
- Province: Province of Huesca
- Municipality: Loporzano
- Elevation: 873 m (2,864 ft)

Population
  - Total: 58

Santa Eulalia la Mayor is a locality located in the municipality of Loporzano, in Huesca province, Aragon, Spain. As of 2020, it has a population of 58.

== Geography ==
Santa Eulalia la Mayor is located 24km northeast of Huesca.
