= Peace of Támara =

1127 treaty between Aragon and Castile

The Peace of Támara also known as the Pact of Támara was a peace treaty signed in Támara de Campos in June 1127 which delimited the territorial domains of Kings Alfonso I of Aragón (the Battler) and Alfonso VII of Castile.

After Alfonso VII took the castle of Burgos in April 1127, Alfonso the Battler met his counterpart in the valley of Támara, where they negotiated to return Castile to the boundaries of 1054, after the battle of Atapuerca and to return the lands acquired in 1076, after the murder of Sancho of Peñalén. In the pact, Alfonso the Battler was recognized as the sovereign of Vizcaya, Álava, Guipúzcoa, Belorado, La Bureba, Soria, San Esteban de Gormaz and La Rioja. In addition, Alfonso the Battler renounced the title of emperor of Spain.

== Sources ==
- Urzainqui Mina, Tomás. La Navarra marítima (1998), Navarra: Pamiela. ISBN 84-7681-293-0
- Serrano Izko, Bixente, Navarra. Las tramas de la historia (2006) Pamplona: Euskara Kultur Elkargoa. ISBN 84-932845-9-9
