= Castilsabás =

- Locality
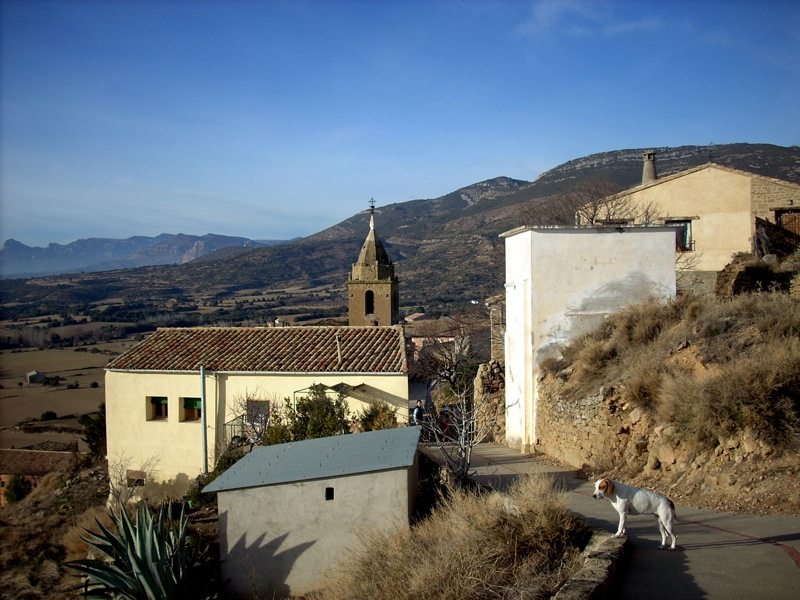

- Location within Aragon Location within Spain
- Coordinates: 42°11′45″N 0°18′17″W
- Country: Spain
- Autonomous community: Aragon
- Province: Province of Huesca
- Municipality: Loporzano
- Elevation: 733 m (2,405 ft)

Population
  - Total: 21

Castilsabás is a locality located in the municipality of Loporzano, in Huesca province, Aragon, Spain. As of 2020, it has a population of 21.

== Geography ==
Castilsabás is located 21km northeast of Huesca.
