= Sipán, Spain =

Sipán
- Locality
- Location within Aragon Location within Spain
- Coordinates: 42°10′41″N 0°15′58″W
- Country: Spain
- Autonomous community: Aragon
- Province: Province of Huesca
- Municipality: Loporzano
- Elevation: 599 m (1,965 ft)

Population
  - Total: 11

Sipán is a locality located in the municipality of Loporzano, in Huesca province, Aragon, Spain. As of 2020, it has a population of 11.

== Geography ==
Sipán is located 20km east-northeast of Huesca.
