= Loporzano =

Municipality in Spain

Coordinates: 42°10′N 0°19′W

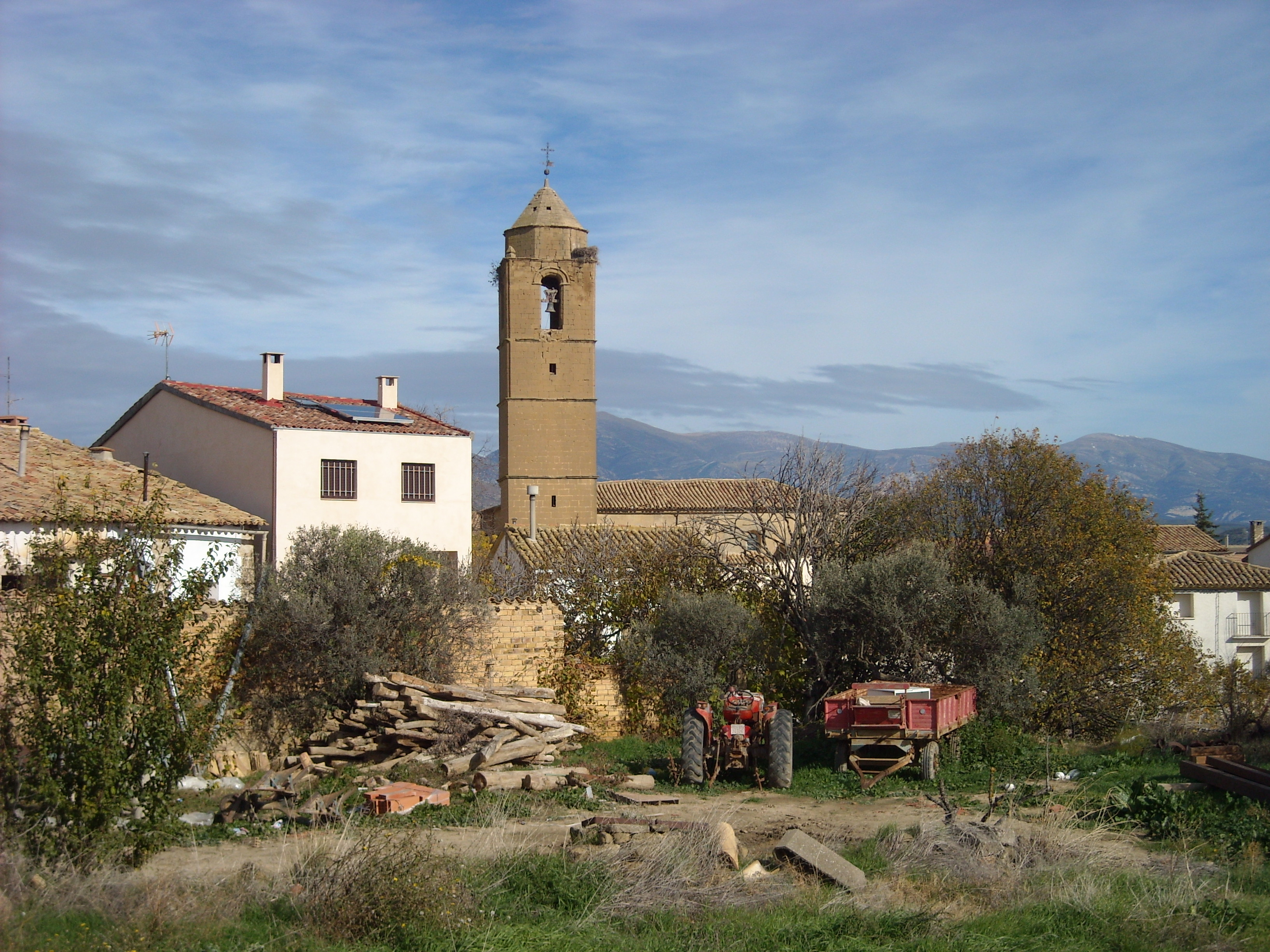
Church in Loporzano

Loporzano's flag

Loporzano's coat of arms

Loporzano is a municipality in the province of Huesca, Spain. As of 2010, it has a population of 540 inhabitants.

== Geography ==
Villages: Aguas, La Almunia del Romeral, Ayera, Bandaliés, Barluenga, Castilsabás, Coscullano, Chibluco, Loscertales, Los Molinos, San Julián de Banzo, Santa Eulalia la Mayor, Sasa del Abadiado, Sipán and Vadiello.

== See also ==
- List of municipalities in Huesca
