= Loscertales =

- Locality
- Location within Aragon Location within Spain
- Coordinates: 42°11′4″N 0°15′34″W
- Country: Spain
- Autonomous community: Aragon
- Province: Province of Huesca
- Municipality: Loporzano
- Elevation: 607 m (1,991 ft)

Population
  - Total: 7

Loscertales is a locality located in the municipality of Loporzano, in Huesca province, Aragon, Spain. As of 2020, it has a population of 7.

== Geography ==
Loscertales is located 22km east-northeast of Huesca.
