= Chronicle of San Juan de la Peña =

Aragonese chronicle written in Latin around before 1359

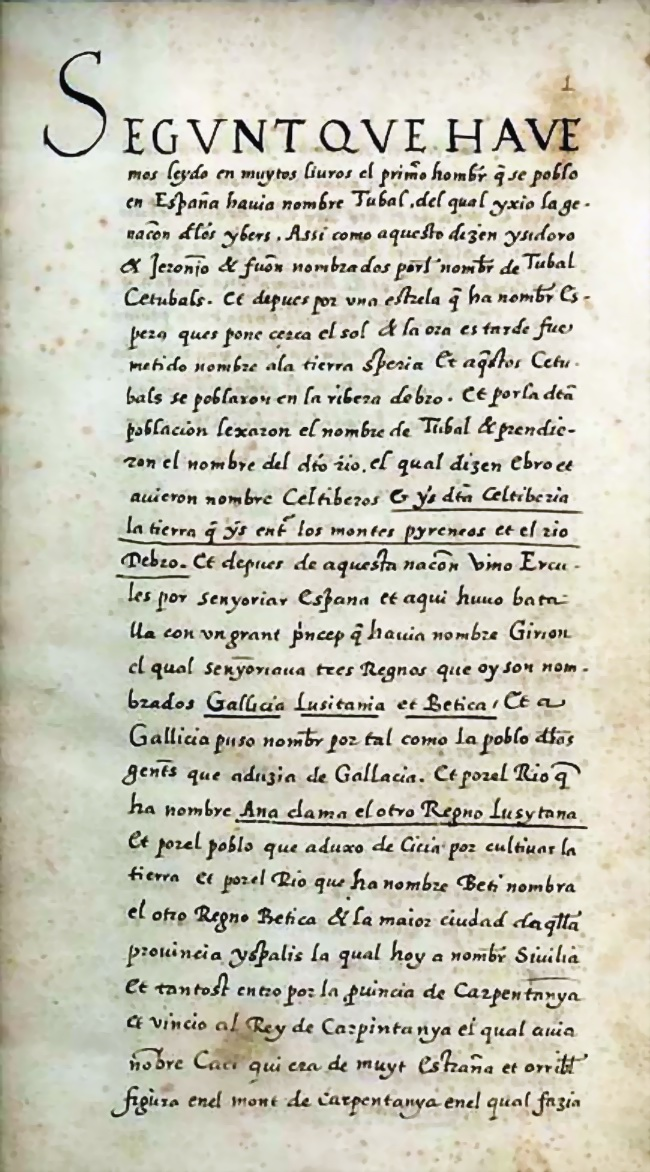
Crónica de San Juan de la Peña (fol. 1r).

The Chronicle of San Juan de la Peña (or Crónica pinatense) is an Aragonese chronicle written in Latin around before 1359 in the monastery of San Juan de la Peña at the behest of Peter IV of Aragon. It was the first general history of Aragon and was probably designed both to justify the royal prerogatives of the Crown of Aragon against the baronage and to match the comparable Castilian work of a century earlier, the Estoria de España. Between 1369 and 1372, Navarro-Aragonese and Catalan translations were produced.

The Chronicle is a compilation from various sources, some more historically solid than others. Though named after the monastery of San Juan, it was only partially compiled there. As early as 1345 Peter IV had asked the monasteries of San Juan and Ripoll to begin compiling material for a general history of the realm. Ripoll's only contribution was a version of the 1162 Gesta comitum Barchinonensium updated to 1310. Only those sections (approximate a third) dealing with events specific to the monastery were probably written in it. The monks of San Juan relied heavily for the history of Spain up to 1137 on De rebus Hispaniae, the work of the Navarrese Rodrigo Jiménez de Rada. The materials compiled at Ripoll and San Juan were eventually sent to Barcelona to be worked together. A finished copy of the work was sent by the king to the Cathedral of Valencia in 1372 and this original still resides in the cathedral library.

A modern Spanish translation by Antonio Ubieto Arteta appeared in 1964, an English translation by Lynn H. Nelson in 1991.
