= Battle of Morella =

1080s battle in Spain

Coordinates: 40.6167°N 0.1°W

- Part of the Reconquista
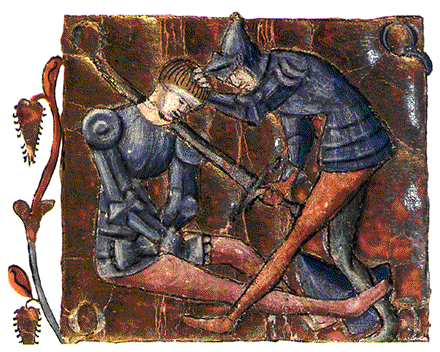
- El Cid, slaying an enemy in battle, from a miniature of 1344.
Date	14 August 1084–88
Location	Morella, southwest of Tortosa, Spain
Result	Zaragozan victory

Belligerents
Aragon–Navarre	Taifa of Zaragoza

Commanders and leaders
Sancho Ramírez	Yusuf al-Mu'tamin; Rodrigo Díaz de Vivar

Strength
Unknown	Unknown

Casualties and losses
2,000 prisoners	Unknown

The Battle of Morella (14 August 1084×88), southwest of Tortosa, was fought between Sancho Ramírez, King of Aragon and Navarre, and Yusuf al-Mu'tamin, King of Zaragoza, while the former was engaged in a campaign of conquest against the latter. All surviving sources for the battle are either later by a generation or literary in character, and they are confused on the chronology and dating of the event. The encounter was a defeat for Sancho and sparked a brief reversal of fortunes in the Navarro-Aragonese Reconquista. The Castilian hero, Rodrigo Díaz de Vivar, El Cid, was a general for al-Mu'tamin at the time. According to the Aragonese Crónica de San Juan de la Peña (c.1370), Sancho later sought out El Cid, who had also defeated his father in the Battle of Graus (1063), and defeated him in the year 1088. However, the Crónica is the only source mentioning such an encounter and, as it was written three hundred years later, most leading scholars give no credence to this claim, which was probably intended to justify the prerogatives of Peter IV of the Crown of Aragon.

In 1084 Sancho attacked the kingdom of Zaragoza. On 5 April he took Arguedas, across the Ebro from Tudela, which he may have attacked but did not take. Moving east he captured Secastilla (Castella) on 22 June (or the tenth kalends of June, that is, 23 May, according to the Crónica), an important position that offered defence of Graus, which he had conquered in 1082. According to the Historia Roderici, El Cid and the king of Zaragoza, setting out from Monzón, perpetrated a five-day raid on Aragon. Then El Cid targeted the southeast of the Taifa of Tortosa, ravaging the territory around Morella, even re-fortifying the castle at Olocau. Sancho, who had avoided confrontation during the raid on his own kingdom, joined with Mundhir al-Hayib, the ruler of the united realms of Denia, Lleida, and Tortosa, and camped by the Ebro. El Cid reportedly replied to the king's demand that he retire with an uncompromising message, and when the two armies joined in battle the former scored "an overwhelming victory" in mid-August, probably 14 August. The Crónica dates it to the Saturday after the capture of Secastilla, that is, 25 May in its calculation. The year 1084 was accepted by Ramón Menéndez Pidal, but Antonio Ubieto Arteta suggested 1088, the year under which the Crónica refers to Sancho seeking out El Cid and defeating him. Bernard Reilly argued for a date of 1084 on the grounds that it would best explain the events of 1085. Ubieto Arteta elsewhere places the Battle of Piedra Pisada in 1084, the unsuccessful culmination of Sancho's campaign into Zaragozan territory.

== Prisoners ==
The aforementioned Historia adds that El Cid chased his fleeing Christian enemies and took 2,000 Aragonese and Navarrese prisoner. Sixteen of whom were important enough for the anonymous author to name:

- Ramón Dalmacio, Bishop of Roda (1077–94)
- Sancho Sánchez, Count of Pamplona (died 1116), nephew of Sancho IV of Navarre
- Blasco Garcés, royal majordomo
- Seven Aragonese and Navarrese tenentes:
  - Pepino Aznar (fl. 1075–93), held Alquézar (1084) and helped repopulate Barbastro (1100)
  - García Aznar (fl. 1063–86), assassinated Centule I of Bigorre and went into exile among the Moors (1088)
  - Íñigo Sánchez (fl. 1082–1116), held Monzón, Calasanz, Monclús (1082–93), and Estada, which he repopulated after its conquest (1087)
  - Jimeno Garcés of Buil
  - Laín Pérez of Pamplona
  - Fortún Garcés of Aragon
  - Sancho Garcés of Alquézar
- Five Leonese-Castilians, probably exiles of Alfonso VI:
  - Nuno II Mendes, Count of Portugal (until 1070)
  - Anaya Suárez (Galicia)
  - Nuño Suárez (León)
  - García Díaz (Castile)
  - Gudesteo González
- A certain Calvet

El Cid also sacked Sancho's camp and carried an enormous booty back to Zaragoza. He was even greeted by celebrant Zaragozans at Fuentes some distance away.
