= Battle of Almenar (1082) =

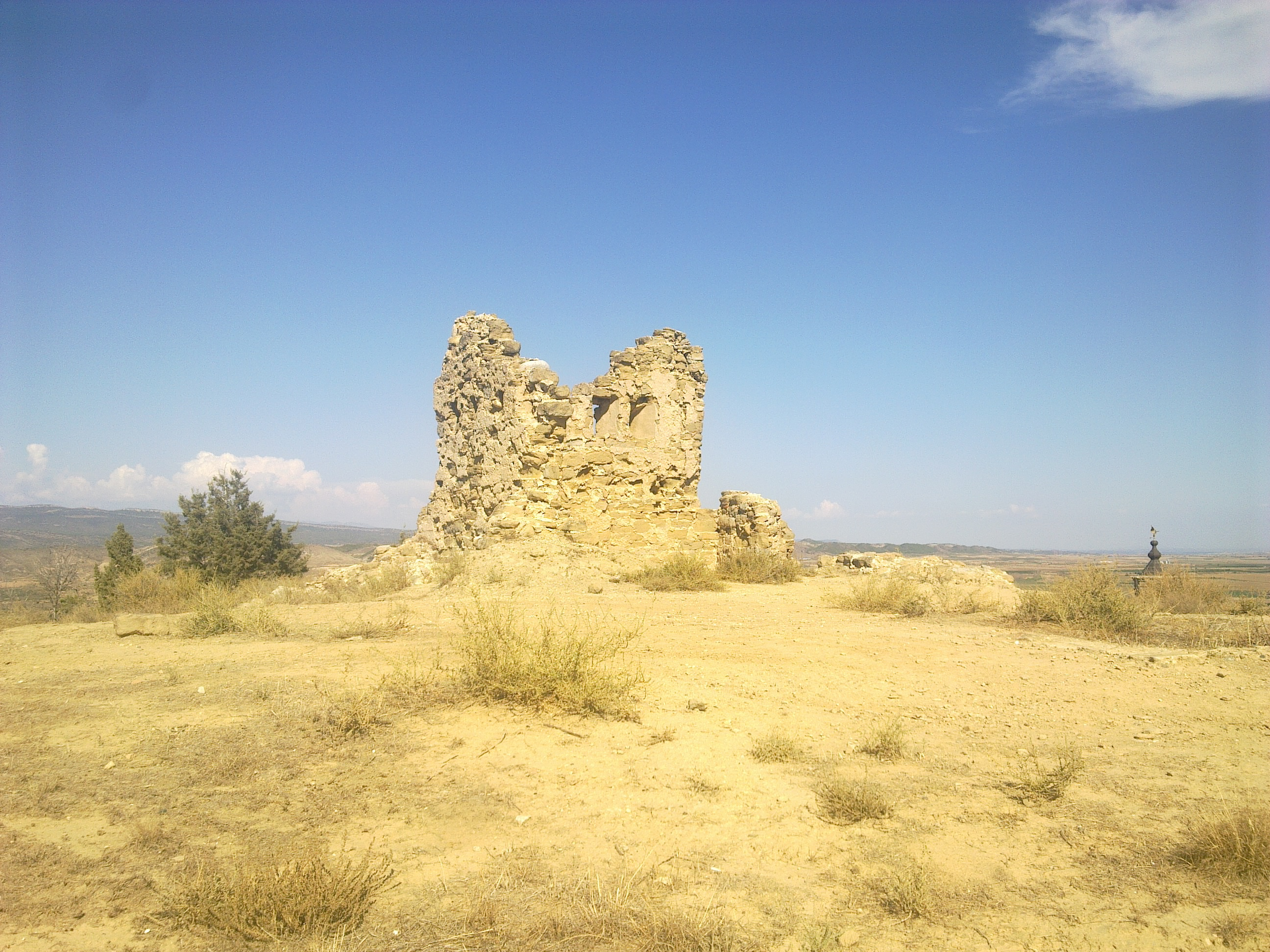
- Ruins of the castle of Almenar today
| Date | Spring or summer 1082 |
| Location | Almenar, Spain |
| Result | Zaragozan victory |

Belligerents
| Taifa of Zaragoza | Taifa of Lleida; County of Barcelona; County of Besalú; County of Carcassonne; County of Cerdanya; County of Empúries; County of Roussillon |

Commanders and leaders
| El Cid | Mundhir al-Ḥājib; Berenguer Ramon II of Barcelona (POW) |

The battle of Almenar was fought in the spring or summer of 1082 between the taifa kingdom of Zaragoza and the taifa kingdom of Lleida. The Zaragozan army under El Cid defeated the Lleidan army and its Catalan allies, thus relieving a siege of Almenar. Count Berenguer Ramon II of Barcelona was taken captive, but was soon released.

== Background ==
Exiled from Castile, El Cid entered the service of Zaragoza in the summer of 1081. In the autumn, the ill ruler al-Muqtadir divided his taifa between his sons, with al-Muʾtamin receiving the western portion based on Zaragoza and Mundhir al-Ḥājib the eastern one based on Lleida. Al-Muqtadir died around July 1082, after the battle of Almenar.

After the division of the taifa, Mundhir allied with King Sancho Ramírez of Aragon and Navarre against his brother. In late 1081 or early 1082, the allies threatened to seize Monzón in the north of al-Muʾtamin's realm. El Cid marched in a single day the 75 kilometres (47 mi) from Zaragoza to Peralta de Alcofea in a show of force directed against Mundhir. The next day he marched 25 kilometres (16 mi) to Monzón, where he negotiated the surrender of the city, which marked its acceptance of al-Muʾtamin as lord. According to the Historia Roderici, a biography of El Cid, Sancho had sworn not to let El Cid take Monzón. He did not challenge El Cid, however, after he had been cut off from Mundhir. El Cid then marched 20 kilometres (12 mi) to accept the submission of Tamarite de Litera. There, according to the late Primera Crónica General, he defeated a detachment of Aragonese knights.

== Lleida forms an alliance ==
According to the Historia, the conflict the culminated at Almenar was ignited by al-Muʾtamin and El Cid's decision to refortify Almenar, only 20 kilometres (12 mi) from Lleida, after their successes at Monzón and Tamarite. In response, the ruler of Lleida, Mundhir formed a coalition with all of the Catalan counties save Pallars. He was joined by Count Berenguer Ramon II of Barcelona, Count William I of Cerdanya, Count Bernard II of Besalú, Count Hugh II of Empúries, Count Giselbert II of Roussillon, the brother of Count Ermengol IV of Urgell and the governor of the county of Carcassonne.

Mundhir's success in recruiting Christian allies probably owed something to their fear of Zaragozan expansionism. At the time, Barcelona was co-governed by two brothers, Berenguer Ramon II and Ramon Berenguer II. The former became involved in the Almenar episode because he had inherited the parias (tribute) of Lleida and thus an obligation to protect it.

== Siege and negotiations ==
After El Cid left Almenar to force the submission of the castle of Escarp some 45 kilometres (28 mi) south, Mundhir and his allies marched on Almenar and besieged it. The siege lasted long enough that the garrison was running short of water. When El Cid learned of the attack while still at Escarp, he sent messengers to inform al-Muʾtamin. As the siege dragged on, he sent a second round of messages recommending immediate action. This prompted al-Muʾtamin to leave the city of Zaragoza. He joined forces with El Cid at Tamarite, about 11 kilometres (6.8 mi) northeast of Almenar.

According to the Historia Roderici, al-Muʾtamin was dissuaded by El Cid from launching an immediate counterattack against the besiegers. El Cid sent envoys to Mundhir and the Catalan princes offering money in exchange for lifting the siege and retiring to their own territory. After these terms were rejected, El Cid marched on Almenar.

The primary motivation for bribing the besiegers was that the allied army was much larger than the forces of Zaragoza and El Cid's personal mesnada (retinue). El Cid probably expected that the Catalans, who did not stand to gain territory anyway, could be persuaded to abandon their ally for money. He may also have wished to avoid if possible having to fight fellow Christians.

== Battle and aftermath ==
The two armies met just outside Almenar. The battle took place in the spring or summer of 1082. The Carmen Campi Doctoris, a poem in praise of El Cid, has a long description of El Cid arming himself for battle, but the text has been damaged and the description of the battle itself is lost. In the Carmen, Almenar is the third fight of El Cid's career, after his combat with the anonymous Navarrese champion and his conflict with García Ordóñez.

The battle began with frontal charges and quickly devolved into a rout of the besiegers. Berenguer Ramon was captured, while Mundhir fled the field. Perhaps because Mundhir and the Lleidans quickly abandoned the field, command seems to have devolved to Berenguer Ramon. According to the Historia Roderici, the number of killed and captured was enormous.

The captives were taken to al-Muʾtamin at Tamarite. They were released five days later. Although later Castilian historiography claims that al-Muʾtamin acted on the urging of El Cid, the Historia Roderici mention no such thing. It is more likely that the captives agreed to pay a large ransom or to sign a peace treaty. The victorious army was received in celebratory fashion by the population of Zaragoza. Al-Muʾtamin rewarded El Cid with gold, silver and jewels and he was regarded thereafter as second-in-command in the taifa.

The Carmen Campi Doctoris was probably written shortly after the battle by a monk of Santa Maria de Ripoll, which lay within the territory of Ramon Berenguer II. It is thus a celebration of the defeat of Berenguer Ramon II.

Almenar was conquered by the Aragonese in 1093.

== Bibliography ==
- Barton, Simon; Fletcher, Richard (2000). The World of El Cid: Chronicles of the Spanish Reconquest. Manchester University Press.
- Fletcher, Richard (1989). The Quest for El Cid. Oxford University Press.
- Martínez Diez, Gonzalo (2007) [1999]. El Cid histórico. Editorial Planeta.
