= Taifa of Lérida =

Muslim state (1039/1046–1102/1110)

Lérida in the ṭāʾifa of Zaragoza, with Denia and Tortosa: these three were separated from Zaragoza from 1081–1102

The Taifa of Lérida (Note: Sometimes called the "Kingdom of Lérida", Spanish Reino de Lérida.) (Arabic: طائفة لاردة) was a factional kingdom (ṭāʾifa) in Muslim Iberia between 1039/1046 and 1102/1110. Based on the city of Lérida (Catalan Lleida, Arabic Lārida), the ṭāʾifa was not an independent state throughout this period but was sometimes a part of the larger ṭāʾifa of Zaragoza ruled by a governor (wālī).

Under the late Córdoban caliphate, Lérida was ruled by wālīs of the Banū Tujīb. In 1039, it was taken from them, along with Zaragoza, by al-Mustaʿīn of the Banū Hūd. At some point prior to his death in 1046, al-Mustaʿīn placed his younger son, Yūsuf ibn Sulaymān ibn Hūd al-Muẓaffar, in charge of Lérida, while in 1046 the elder son, Aḥmad al-Muḳtadir, inherited Zaragoza. From 1045, Count Ramon Berenguer I of Barcelona forced the brothers to pay tribute (parias) in return for his not attacking them. In 1064, the brothers had a falling-out over the loss of Barbastro to an international Christian army, for which defeat al-Muḳtadir blamed Yūsuf, although the city was soon recovered.

After al-Muḳtadir of Zaragoza acquired the ṭāʾifa of Tortosa in 1061 and the ṭāʾifa of Denia in 1076, he and his brother fought a civil war in 1078–81, resulting in the reunification of al-Mustaʿīn's principality in al-Muḳtadir's hands. When al-Muḳtadir died in late 1081, the ṭāʾifa was divided between his two sons. The younger, al-Mundhir, who was already governing Denia and Tortosa as his father's ḥājib, inherited Lérida also.

The ṭāʾifa of Lérida, as the northeasternmost of the states to come out of the division of 1081, bore the brunt of the conflict with Sancho Ramírez, king of Aragon, and his son, Peter, king of Sobrarbe, who steadily advanced down the valley of the Cinca. In 1083, they took Graus; then, between 1087 and 1093, Peter took Estada, Monzón and Almenar. In 1089, Count Ermengol IV of Urgell launched an attack towards Balaguer, possibly even taking the city temporarily.

In 1090, al-Mundhir died and was succeeded by his son, Sulaymān ibn Hūd, a minor. Sulaymān's regents divided the ṭāʾifa, separating Denia and Tortosa to their own advantage and leaving him a rump Lérida. In 1100, Peter, now king of Aragon, captured Barbastro, the second city of the ṭāʾifa, and Sariñena. In 1101, the capture of Pomar de Cinca and Albalate de Cinca brought the Aragonese up to Lérida itself.

Under al-Mundhir and his son, Lérida paid tribute to Count Ramon Berenguer III of Barcelona and Count Ermengol V of Urgell. Ermengol V died in the battle of Mollerussa fighting the North African Almoravids, who were trying to subdue the ṭāʾifa of Lérida, in September 1102. Lérida appears to have fallen to the Almoravids that year, although others have it lasting until 1110. The Almoravids appointed wālīs to govern it until it was captured by the Catalans in 1149.

== Rulers of Lérida ==
- Yūsuf ibn Sulaymān ibn Hūd al-Muẓaffar (1039/1046–1078/1081)
- Mundhir al-Ḥājib (1081–1090), nephew of predecessor.
- Sulaymān ibn Hūd (1090–1102/1110), son of predecessor.

== Sources ==
- Bisson, Thomas N. (1986). The Medieval Crown of Aragon: A Short History. Oxford: Clarendon Press.
- Bosch Vilá, Jacinto (1986). "Lārida". The Encyclopaedia of Islam. Vol. 5, Khe–Mahi (new ed.). Leiden: Brill. pp. 682–83.
- Fletcher, Richard A. (1989). The Quest for El Cid. New York: Alfred A. Knopf.
- Lladonosa i Pujol, Josep (1972). Història de Lleida. Vol. 1, Lleida antiga. Tarrega.
- Lladonosa i Pujol, Josep (1974). Lérida medieval. Vol. 1. Dilagro.
- Martínez Díez, Gonzalo (1999). El Cid histórico: un estudio exhaustivo sobre el verdadero Rodrigo Díaz de Vivar. Barcelona: Editorial Planeta.
- Mendonsa, Eugene L. (2008). The Scripting of Domination in Medieval Catalonia: An Anthropological View (PDF). Carolina Academic Press. ISBN 978-1-59460-486-7.
- Miret i Sans, Joaquim (1904). "La casa condal de Urgell en Provenza". Butlletí de la Reial Acadèmia de Bones Lletres de Barcelona. 2 (9).
- Mora Giné, Xavier (2010). Un poble del comtat d ́Urgell: Alberola. Edicions de la Universitat de Lleida.
- Pita Mercé, Rodrigo (1974). Lérida árabe. Lleida: Dilagro Ediciones.
- Reilly, Bernard F. (1993). The Medieval Spains. Cambridge University Press.
- Stalls, William Clay (1995). Possessing the Land: Aragon's Expansion Into Islam's Ebro Frontier under Alfonso the Battler, 1104–1134. Leiden: Brill.
- Turk, Afif (1978). El reino de Zaragoza en el siglo XI de Cristo (V de la Hégira). Madrid: Publicaciones del Instituto Egipcio de Estudios Islamicos.
