= Conquest of Balaguer =

1106 battle during the Reconquista

- Part of the Reconquista
Date	1106
Location	Balaguer, Taifa of Lérida
Result	Christian victory

Belligerents
County of Barcelona; County of Urgell	Almoravid Empire

Commanders and leaders
Pedro Ansúrez	Unknown

Strength
Unknown	Unknown

Casualties and losses
Unknown	Unknown

The Conquest of Balaguer was the capture of the city of Balaguer and its citadel from the Almoravids in 1106 by Pedro Ansúrez, the guardian for Ermengol VI of Urgell - a child at the time. The conquest was accomplished with the assistance of Ramon Berenguer III of Barcelona.

== Background - Geography ==
Lubb ibn Muhammad, after defeating Wilfred the Hairy by mortally wounding him in the raid of 897, built a defensive fortress/citadel in Balaguer that protected the northern approaches of the Taifa of Lérida from Christian incursions coming from the Pyrenees and the County of Urgell. By the 11th century, the Muslim rulers had transformed the citadel from strictly a military site into a lavish and beautiful palace known as a Suda.

== Background - Muslim rulers ==
In 1039, al-Mustaʿīn conquered the Taifa of Zaragoza and reigned throughout the Upper March. Prior to his death in 1046, al-Mustaʿīn placed his younger son, Yūsuf ibn Sulaymān ibn Hūd al-Muẓaffar, in charge of Lérida. Later in 1046 at the time of al-Mustaʿīn's death, Aḥmad al-Muḳtadir, the elder son, inherited Zaragoza.

Al-Muḳtadir of Zaragoza grew his domain and acquired the Taifa of Tortosa in 1061 and the Taifa of Denia in 1076. Two years later in 1078, civil war between al-Muḳtadir and his brother, al-Muẓaffar ensued. In the war, Al-Muḳtadir defeated al-Muẓaffar and put him in prison. One year later in 1079, al-Muẓaffar was forced to renounce his claim to Lérida.

In 1081, al-Muḳtadir died, passing the reunified kingdom to his two sons. The younger son al-Mundhir, inherited Lérida, Tortosa, and Denia while the older son, Yusuf al-Mu'taman inherited Zaragoza. In 1090, al-Mundhir died and was succeeded by his son, Sulaymān ibn Hūd, a minor. Sulaymān's regents divided the kingdom, separating Denia and Tortosa to their own advantage leaving him a rump Lérida.

== The conquest ==
At the start of 1094, Ermengol V of Urgell captured Balaguer as part of his long-term goal to expand the County of Urgell southward. His victory was short-lived, however, as by the end of the year, Sayyid-ad-Dawla with the assistance of the Almoravids regained controlled of the city. Since 1086, the Almoravids had been moving into al-Andalus to assist the taifa kingdoms halt the Christian Reconquista and in this case they provided Sayyid-ad-Dawla with the extra military force necessary to drive Ermengol's forces back out of the city.

The struggle for the city, however, continued to be a back-and-forth affair. In the winter of 1100/1101, Ermengol V reconquered Balaguer only to lose the city to the Almoravids again in 1103.

In 1106, the battle for Balaguer reached a conclusion when Pedro Ansúrez and Ramon Berenguer III of Barcelona besieged the city. At the outset, entry and egress to the city was cut off in order to weaken the city's defense before attempting a direct assault on the protective walls.

The defenders attempted to fight off the besiegers by means of mounted sorties and also through coordinated volleys of projectiles from defensive positions. In addition, the Almoravid governor sought the assistance of relief forces from the emirs of neighboring taifas. None of the tactics had much success, and after a prolonged period, the Christians attacked in force, eventually breaking through the city walls to gain entry and capture the city including the citadel.

== Consequences ==
With the conquest in 1106, the Counts of Urgell occupied the Suda to temporarily make it their residence and set themselves the target of capturing the major, fortified Muslim city of Lleida. Over the next 25 years, however, the process of eliminating Muslim control in the Segrià region was long and incremental. The Christian expansion in the territory suffered fluctuating fortunes with many surrounding areas, including places near Balaguer temporarily held or retaken by Almoravid forces. The territory surrounding Balaguer was not fully secured until approximately 1130 and the city of Lleida itself was not captured until 1149.
