= Battle of Piedra Pisada =

- Part of the Reconquista
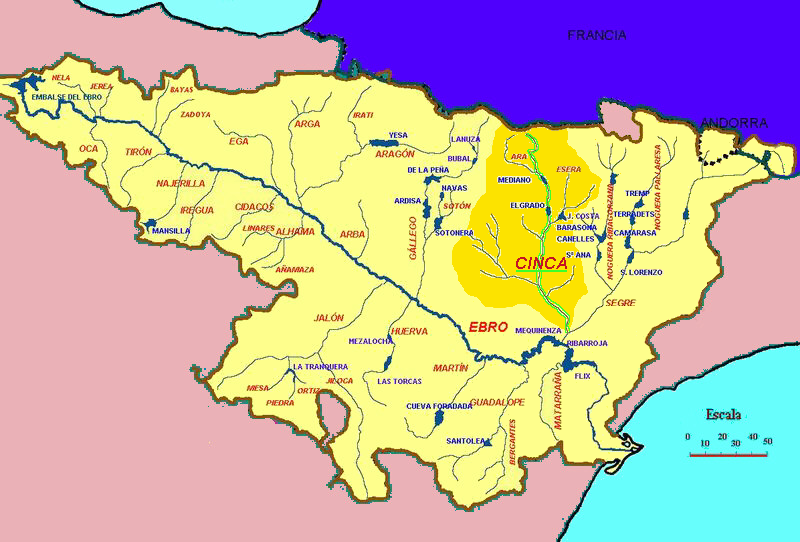
- The course of the Cinca, showing El Grado, a few miles downstream from the battle
Date	25 December 1084
Location	Coto de Pisa, near Naval, Aragón
Result	Muslim (Zaragozan) victory
Territorial changes	Aragonese loss of Naval shortly after the battle

Belligerents
Christian Aragon	Muslim Zaragoza

Commanders and leaders
Sancho Ramírez	Unknown

On 25 December 1084, at the Battle of Piedra Pisada, the Taifa of Zaragoza fought and probably defeated the Kingdom of Aragon on the road south from Naval to El Grado. The battle was a minor engagement of the ongoing Reconquista of Aragon, the process by which the riverine valleys of the southern slopes of the Pyrenees were gradually conquered and returned, after centuries of Muslim rule, to the control of Christian princes. The ruler of Aragon, who personally led his men in battle at Piedra Pisada, Sancho Ramírez, also ruled Kingdom of Navarre and was a major figure in the contemporary Reconquista.

The battle is only recorded in two later sources, the Aragonese and Latin versions of the Chronicle of San Juan de la Peña. The former says that "in the year of our Lord 1083 ... [Sancho Ramírez] did battle in Piedra-pissada with the Moors on Christmas day." The Latin translation reads: "And [Sancho] made battle before Petram Pisadam with the Moors, the day of the Nativity in the year of our Lord 1084." The two texts differ in the year, and neither specifies the winner of the engagement. The location of Petra Pisata was long thought to be Piedratajada, but this is unlikely on linguistic grounds. In a document nearly contemporary with the battle, Peter I of Aragon and Navarre, Sancho's son and successor, enumerated the parishes whose tithes belonged to the church of Santa María of Alquézar in geographic order from east to west, placing Petra Pisata between Naval and Salinas de Hoz. A forged document from the late twelfth or more likely the thirteenth century purportedly from October 1099 lists the same parishes owing tithes to Alquézar, but in a less orderly manner, naming among them Petra Piza. In the thirteenth century, the name of the site had degenerated further to simply Pisa, which has been identified with the coto redondo de Pisa, a collection of farms south of Naval.

The Reconquista of what are today the comarcas of Bajo Cinca, Cinca Medio, Ribagorza, Sobrarbe and Somontano de Barbastro was effected along two ancient routes, probably of Roman origin. One followed the river Ésera through the important town of Graus south to Monzón and the lower reaches of the river Cinca. East of the Cinca lay the other route, connecting Boltaña and Barbastro. The Reconquista of the Cinca valley and surrounding territory to its west was rapid. By 1049 Perarrúa was the most advanced position on the Ésera, held by a don Suniero, and by 1062 Laguarres was the most advanced position on the Isábena. Both faced the formidable city of Graus, which was unsuccessfully besieged as early as 1055 and again in 1063 with disastrous results, finally falling to the Christians on 14 April 1083. By 1083 all lands north of the Sierra de Estada were in Aragonese hands. On the other side of the Cinca the town of Castejón de Sobrarbe fell in 1057 and that of Abizanda in 1059, but further progress was slower. Naval, which was essential to the defence of Barbastro (which was briefly occupied in 1063–64), and Arguedas were not taken until 1084, and shortly lost to the Moors for a decade.

Since Piedra Pisada (Pisa) lies on the road south from Naval, the Aragonese army would have had to bypass an important enemy fortification in order to fight there, unless Naval had already been taken. It is most likely therefore that the date of 1084 found in the Latin chronicle is correct. Since the loss of Naval posed a threat to Barbastro, it is likely that forces from the taifa were sent to retake it later in 1084 and that it was these forces which Sancho Ramírez met on the road south from Naval. Since neither surviving record of the battle, both Christian, records the outcome and Naval is known to have lapsed out of Christian control soon after its conquest, it is probable that the battle was a loss for Sancho.

In the aftermath of the defeat at Piedra Pisada, in 1085 Sancho invested his son Peter as king of Ribagorza and Sobrarbe under Aragonese suzerainty. Estada was conquered in July 1087, and Monzón with the aid of some defecting Muslims in 1089. In 1095 Peter accepted the surrender of the garrison of the castle Naval, and in October 1099 he made an accord with its Christian populators.
