= Mundhir al-Hajib =

al-Muqtadir's taifa c. 1080, showing the territories of Lleida, Dénia and Tortosa set aside for Mundhir

ʿImād al-Dawla Mundhir ibn al-Muqtadir (died 1090 [AH 483]), called al-Ḥājib, was the Hudid ruler of the taifas of Dénia, Lleida and Tortosa from 1081 until his death.

Prior to 1081, Mundhir ruled Dénia and Tortosa in the name of his father, al-Muqtadir. (Dénia had been conquered by al-Muqtadir in 1076.) According to the Memoirs of ʿAbd Allāh of Granada, "his aged father, however, allowed him no money lest, in view of his impetuosity and thrusting nature, he should oppose his brother" al-Muʾtamin. In the autumn of 1081, the ill al-Muqtadir divided his realm between his sons, with al-Muʾtamin receiving the western portion based on Zaragoza and Mundhir the eastern one based on Lleida, including Dénia and Tortosa. Al-Muqtadir died around July 1082.

Mundhir, according to ʿAbd Allāh, "would not submit to al-Muʾtamin, but considered himself his equal because he was good to the troops and displayed generosity towards them", garnering their loyalty. According to the Historia Roderici, "a cruel and most durable discord full of hate" arose between Mundhir and his brother so that at one point they even fixed a date and place for a duel.

Mundhir, however, struck an alliance with King Sancho Ramírez of Aragon and Navarre. In late 1081 or early 1082, the allies threatened to seize Monzón in the north of al-Muʾtamin's realm. The Christian warrior Rodrigo Díaz de Vivar, better known as El Cid, who had entered the service of al-Muqtadir and remained loyal to al-Muʾtamin, marched to Peralta de Alcofea in a show of force directed against Mundhir. The next day he forced the surrender of Monzón and its acceptance of al-Muʾtamin as lord. Sancho, having been cut off from Mundhir, elected not to challenge El Cid, who then accepted the submission of Tamarite de Litera.

Mundhir then expanded his alliance with the Catalan counties under the leadership of Count Berenguer Ramon II of Barcelona. His success in recruiting Christian allies probably owed something to their fear of Zaragozan expansionism. At the time, Barcelona was co-governed by two brothers, Berenguer Ramon II and Ramon Berenguer II. The former had inherited the parias (tribute) of Lleida and thus an obligation to protect it. With his new allies, Mundhir laid siege to Almenar. He rejected the offer of a ransom to abandon the siege. A relief force under El Cid defeated the allies in the spring or summer of 1082 at the Battle of Almenar.

In 1084, El Cid raided the territory around Morella and Olocáu in the taifa of Tortosa. Mundhir and Sancho Ramírez then jointly invaded Zaragoza but were defeated by El Cid on the banks of the Ebro in August.

Mundhir made peace with El Cid in 1090 and died later that year. He was succeeded by a young son, Sulaymān Sayyid al-Dawla.

== Bibliography ==
- Barton, Simon; Fletcher, Richard (2000). The World of El Cid: Chronicles of the Spanish Reconquest. Manchester University Press.
- Catlos, Brian A. (2014). Infidel Kings and Unholy Warriors: Faith, Power, and Violence in the Age of Crusade and Jihad. New York: Farrar, Straus and Giroux.
- Dunlop, D. M. (1971). "Hūdids". In Lewis, B.; Ménage, V. L.; Pellat, Ch. & Schacht, J. (eds.). The Encyclopaedia of Islam, Second Edition. Volume III: H–Iram. Leiden: E. J. Brill. pp. 542–543. OCLC 495469525.
- Fletcher, Richard (1989). The Quest for El Cid. Oxford University Press.
- Forcada, Miquel (2023). "Al-Muʾtaman ibn Hūd in Context: Kingship and Philosophy in al-Andalus (10th–11th Centuries)". Studia Islamica. 118 (1): 1–47. doi:10.1163/19585705-12341474.
- Martínez Diez, Gonzalo (2007) [1999]. El Cid histórico. Editorial Planeta.
- Stalls, William Clay (1995). Possessing the Land: Aragon's Expansion Into Islam's Ebro Frontier under Alfonso the Battler, 1104–1134. Brill.
- Tibi, Amin T., ed. (1986). The Tibyān: Memoirs of ʿAbd Allāh b. Buluggīn, Last Zīrid Amīr of Granada — Translated from the Emended Arabic Text and Provided with Introduction, Notes and Comments. E. J. Brill. doi:10.1163/9789004624207.
