= Sulayman Sayyid al-Dawla =

11th-century Hudid ruler

Sulaymān Sayyid al-Dawla (or Sulaymān ibn Hūd) was the Hudid ruler of the taifas of Dénia in 1090–1092 and Lleida and Tortosa in 1090–1099.

Sulaymān was the son and successor of Mundhir al-Ḥājib. He was a minor at his accession and was under the guardianship of three men of the Banū Batīr, although the Memoirs of ʿAbd Allāh of Granada mentions a single vizier. The regents divided the taifa between them, one holding Dénia, one Tortosa and another Játiva. They negotiated the payment of a large annual tribute (parias) of 50,000 dinars to the warlord El Cid. They also ceded to El Cid the towns of Lucena, Moleta and Villafranca. The vizier of Játiva had the castle of Peña Cadiella razed after offering it to El Cid in lieu of tribute. Sulaymān's residence was in Dénia.

In 1091 or 1092, the Almoravids took Dénia and Játiva. Sulaymān fled to Tortosa. The latest dirhams struck in his name at Dénia are from 1090 (AH 483), while the sequence struck at Tortosa goes from 1090 down to 1099 (AH 492). In 1092, Sulaymān supplied troops to El Cid for the latter's campaign against García Ordóñez. Later that year, the fleets of the republics of Genoa and Pisa in concert with the land forces of Aragon and Barcelona laid siege to Tortosa. They were beaten off, with the Aragonese suffering severe losses. The Almoravids took Tortosa sometime after their capture of Valencia in 1102.

== Bibliography ==
- Menéndez Pidal, Ramón (2016) [1934]. The Cid and His Spain. Vol. 1. Routledge.
- Seybold, C. F. & Huici Miranda, A. (1965). "Dāniya". In Lewis, B.; Pellat, Ch. & Schacht, J. (eds.). The Encyclopaedia of Islam, Second Edition. Volume II: C–G. Leiden: E. J. Brill. pp. 111–112. OCLC 495469475.
- Tibi, Amin T., ed. (1986). The Tibyān: Memoirs of ʿAbd Allāh b. Buluggīn, Last Zīrid Amīr of Granada — Translated from the Emended Arabic Text and Provided with Introduction, Notes and Comments. E. J. Brill. doi:10.1163/9789004624207.
- Viguera Molins, María Jesús (2000). "Ṭurṭūsha". In Bearman, P. J.; Bianquis, Th.; Bosworth, C. E.; van Donzel, E. & Heinrichs, W. P. (eds.). The Encyclopaedia of Islam, Second Edition. Volume X: T–U. Leiden: E. J. Brill. pp. 738–739. ISBN 978-90-04-11211-7.
