= Peter I of Aragon and Pamplona =

King of Aragon and Pamplona from 1094 to 1104

Peter I
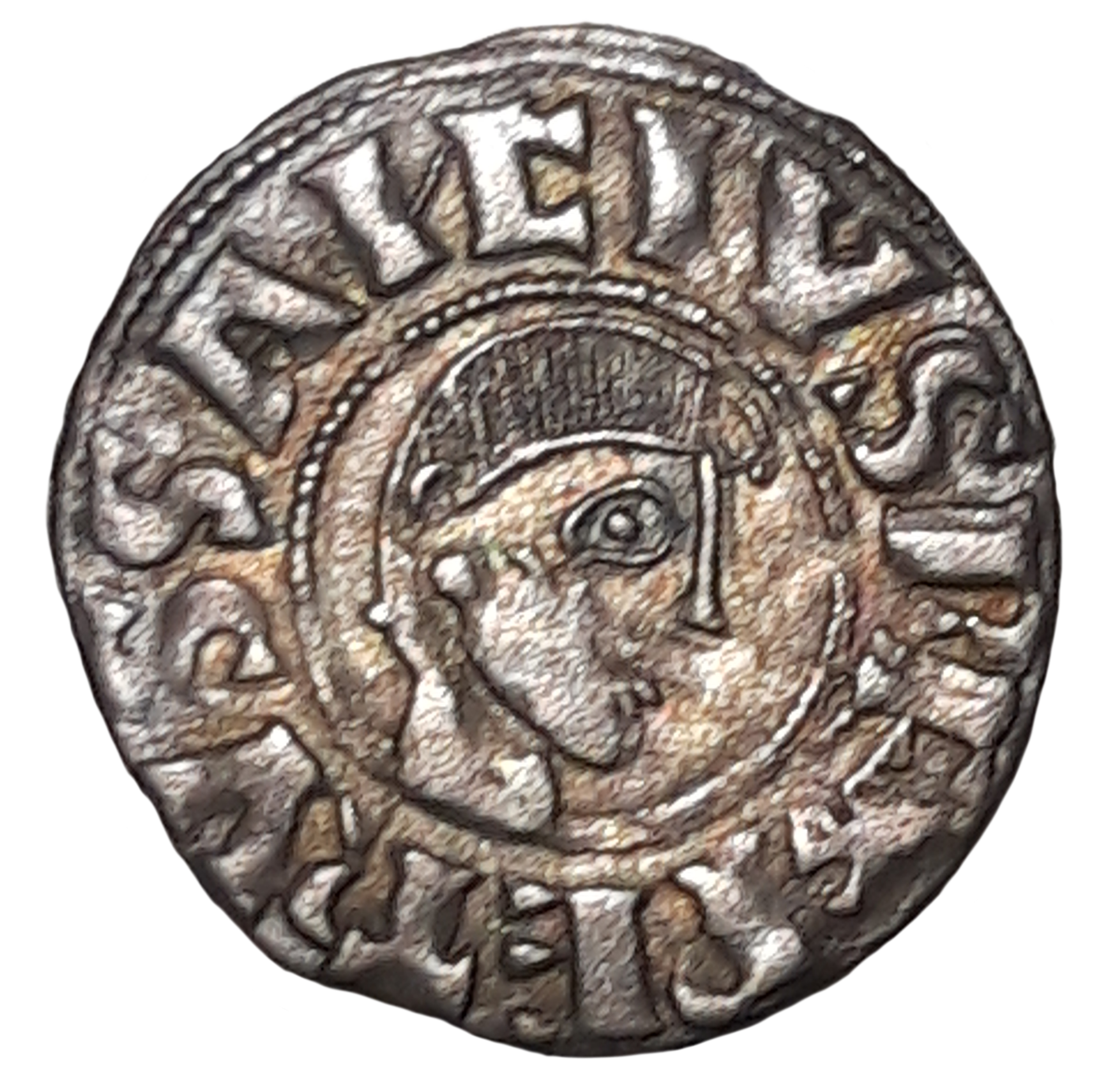
- Peter's effigy on a coin

King of Aragon and Pamplona
- Reign: 1094 – 1104
- Predecessor: Sancho Ramírez
- Successor: Alfonso the Battler
- Born: c. 1068
- Died: 1104
- Burial: Royal Monastery of San Juan de la Peña
- Spouses: Agnes of Aquitaine; Bertha of Aragon
- House: Jiménez
- Father: Sancho Ramírez
- Mother: Isabella of Urgell

Peter I (Spanish: Pedro, Aragonese: Pero, Basque: Petri; c. 1068 – 1104) was King of Aragon and also Pamplona from 1094 until his death in 1104. He was the eldest son of Sancho Ramírez, from whom he inherited the crowns of Aragon and Pamplona, and Isabella of Urgell. He was named in honour of Saint Peter, because of his father's special devotion to the Holy See, to which he had made his kingdom a vassal. Peter continued his father's close alliance with the Church and pursued his military thrust south against bordering Al-Andalus taifas with great success, allying with Rodrigo Díaz de Vivar, known as El Cid, the ruler of Valencia, against the Almoravids. According to the medieval Annales Compostellani, Peter was "expert in war and daring in initiative", and one modern historian has remarked that "his grasp of the possibilities inherent in the age seems to have been faultless."

== Early life ==
The royal sign (signum regis) of Peter I. Peter could also write his signature in Arabic.

The Crónica de San Juan de la Peña, a rather late source for Peter's reign, states that Peter was 35 years of age when he died, which places his birth in 1068 or 1069. As a child Peter was placed in the line of succession to the County of Urgell by the first testament of his uncle Ermengol IV, after Ermengol's own son and brothers. He was not destined to inherit it.

In 1085, two years after his father had conquered Graus (28 April 1083), Peter was entrusted with Sobrarbe and Ribagorza as a subkingdom with its capital at Graus, which he thenceforth ruled more or less independently with the title of king (Latin rex). On 28 October 1087 Peter joined his father in Pamplona in Navarre, where the two monarchs confirmed the rights of the bishops in the city. He pursued the Reconquista with vigour in the southeast of the realm. In 1087 he may have been present at the unsuccessful siege of Tudela. Later that year he conquered Estada, in 1088 Montearagón, and on 24 June 1089 Monzón. These conquests opened up the valley of the Cinca, which he proceeded to conquer as far as Almenar, taken in 1093.

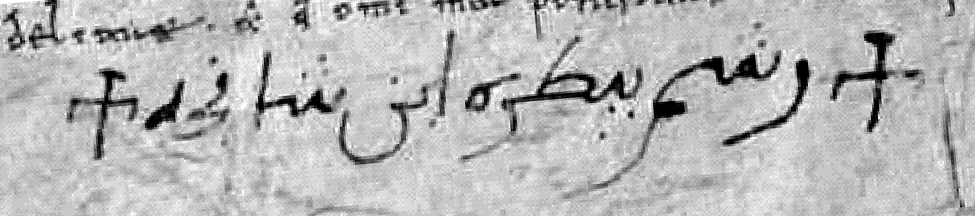
Signature in Arabic of Peter I of Aragon. Transliteration: <ršm byṭrh ˀbn šˀnǧh>. Phonetic transcription in Andalusian dialectal Arabic: /ráš(a)m Béṭro (a)ben Šánǧo/ or /ráš(a)m Péṭro (a)ben Šánčo /. Spanish translation: 'Sign [=signum] of Pedro, son of Sancho'.

== Sole reign ==
Peter succeeded to the whole of his father's kingdom on the latter's death while besieging Huesca in 1094. Peter raised the siege, only to return to it within the year. After 1094 his objectives shifted westwards, towards the valley of the Gallega. In 1095 Peter renewed his father's oaths to Urban II, and Urban renewed his promise of protection, under which Sancho, his sons, and his kingdom had been placed in July 1089. On 16 March 1095 the pope even issued a bull, Cum universis sancte, granting the king and queen of Aragon immunity from excommunication without the permission of the pope. That same year, while he was besieging Huesca, Peter defeated the relief forces of the Taifa of Zaragoza at the Battle of Alcoraz. Peter later rewarded a certain Sancho Crispo for his contribution of three hundred knights and infantry at Alcoraz. He went on to take Huesca on 27 November of that same year.

=== Reconquista and war with the Almoravids ===
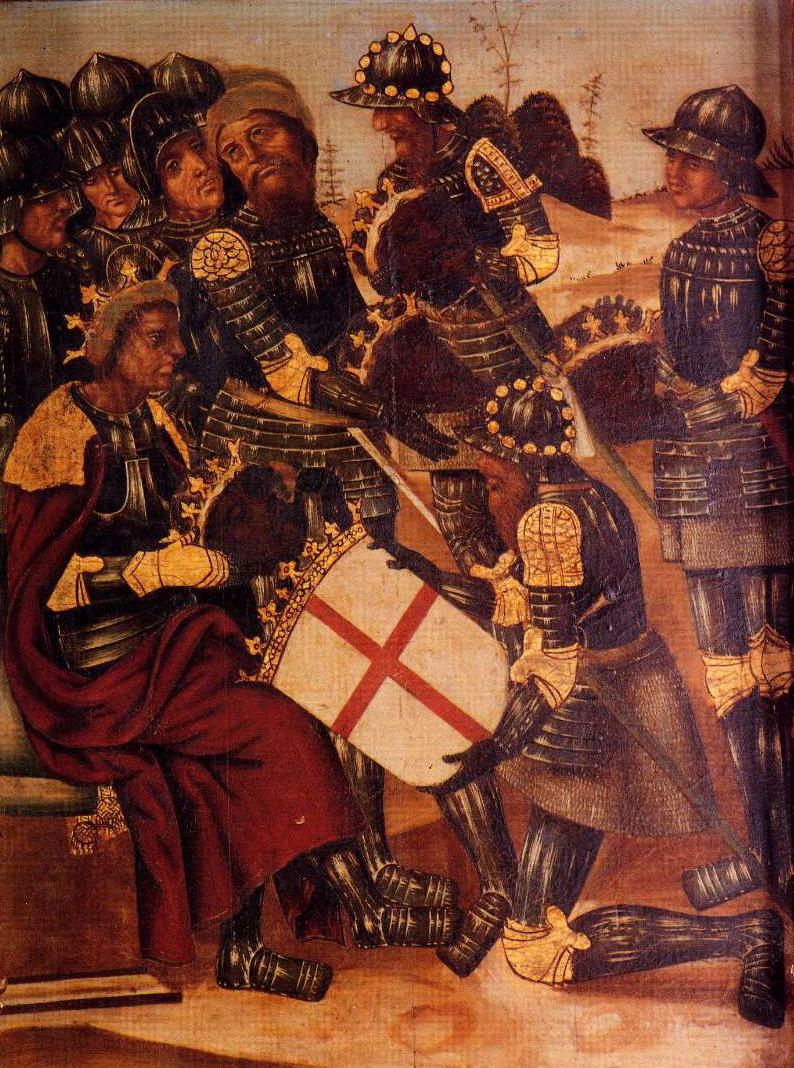
Peter receiving a shield emblazoned with St George's Cross. According to legend, George appeared on the field of battle at Alcoraz. The heads of four decapitated Moors found on the battlefield were added to George's familiar emblem, creating the Cross of Alcoraz (the basis for the Sardinian coat-of-arms).

The next year (1096) Peter travelled south to inspect his fortress at Castellón, though the Historia Roderici claims that he came to help Rodrigo. He met Rodrigo in Valencia and with a large force already assembled they decided to reinforce the southern frontier fort of Benicadell, rebuilt by Rodrigo in 1091. As they were passing by Xàtiva they were met by an Almoravid force under the command of Mohammed, the nephew of Almoravid leader Yusuf ibn Tashfin, and the commander whom Rodrigo had defeated at the Battle of Cuarte in 1095. They decided to hastily restock Benicadell and retreat to Valencia via the coast, but were met at the Battle of Bairén by Muhammad's forces encamped on the high ground that reached almost to the sea. A small Almoravid fleet had been assembled from the southern ports, including Almería, and the Christians were trapped between arrow fire from the ships and the cavalry perched atop the hill. Rodrigo roused the troops with a speech and the next day at midday the Christians charged. The Battle of Xàtiva ended in a rout, with many Almoravids killed or forced into the river or the sea, where many drowned. Peter and Rodrigo returned to Valencia in triumph and thanking God for the victory, as the Historia records.

In 1099, in preparation for the fall of Barbastro, Peter sent Ponce, then Bishop of Roda, to Rome to ask Pope Urban II to transfer the see of Roda to Barbastro. The pope complied with Peter's request, and endowed the transferred diocese with all the re-conquered lands of the Diocese of Lleida. Peter's motive in this action was probably to curtail any expansion of the Diocese of Urgell in the direction of Lleida. In any case, Barbastro fell in 1100.

According to what is probably a legend, at the urging of the monks of San Juan de la Peña Peter planned to join on the Crusade of 1101 and make a pilgrimage to Jerusalem, but Pope Paschal II refused to allow it and ordered him to make war on Zaragoza instead. Peter, probably aided by knights from France and Catalonia, certainly did make war on Zaragoza in 1101, in a campaign that lasted the whole year. He may have been inspired by the First Crusaders, since contemporary accounts of the 1101 campaign call him a "cross-bearer" (crucifer). The size of his forces so impressed a contemporary scribe in León that he remarked in the dating formula of a document of 12 February that "Peter, Aragonese king, with his infinite multitude of armed men, the city of Zaragoza, with Christ's banner, fought". By June Peter had begun the siege of Zaragoza itself. For the siege he had a fortress built named Juslibol (a corruption of the Latin slogan Deus lo volt [God wills it] used by the First Crusaders) and ringed the city with banners bearing the cross. In August he was conducting a razzia (raid) as far south as Alpenes and the river Ebro, but the campaign was eventually aborted due to insufficient cavalry. By the end of the year he had expanded Aragon and Navarre in the west almost as far as the walls of Zaragoza and Tudela, though the cities both remained in Muslim hands.

=== Administration of the realm and the granting of fueros ===
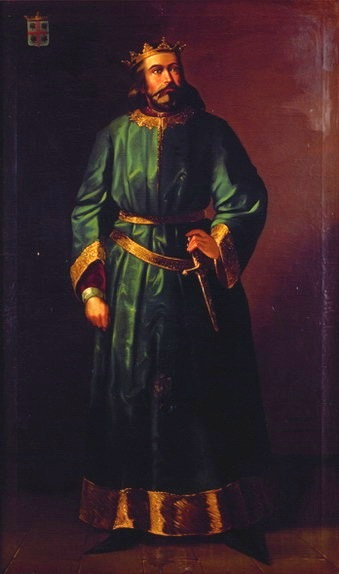
Late and fanciful painting of Peter I. The hand on the sword is an accurate pictorial comment on his reign.

During his reign Peter bestowed fueros on Barbastro (1100), Caparroso (1102), and Santacara (1102). The last was repopulated partly by Frenchmen, whose influence on local customs is apparent. According to Peter's fueros, citizens were required to serve in local campaigns and castle defence, but were exempted from long-term service in the "host". Horse-owners resident in the towns of Barbastro and Santa Cristina de Somport (1104) were also exempted from knight-service, known as cavalcata. In 1101 Peter delineated the boundaries of the diocese of Barbastro–Roda, and those that would belong to Lleida after its reconquest. On 11 December 1102 Peter was in Estella on the border with Castile, perhaps seeking the aid of Alfonso VI after a particularly disastrous autumn for the Christians of eastern Spain. In 1104 Peter granted a fuero to all the infanzones of his realm, retaining his right to require three-day field service.

== Succession ==
Peter's first marriage, to Agnes of Aquitaine (betrothed 1081), was arranged by his father and took place in the capital of Jaca in January 1086. His second marriage, to a certain Bertha, probably from Lombardy, was officiated in Huesca on 16 August 1097. This represented the transferral of the capital of Aragon from Jaca to the larger city of Huesca. Peter's only children, Isabella and Peter (born c. 1086), both from his first marriage, died young in 1103 and on 1 February 1104, respectively. Peter was married to María Rodríguez, a daughter of El Cid, in 1098 - a marriage celebrated in the Cantar de mio Cid and in subsequent literature. Both Isabella and Peter were interred in San Juan de la Peña on 18 August 1104.

When Peter I died in the Val d'Aran his kingdoms passed to his younger half-brother, Alfonso the Battler. (Note: The date of his death is given as III Kal Oct (the third Kalends of October, that is, 29 September) in the Crónica de San Juan de la Peña, but as IV Kal Oct (28 September) in the Annales Compostellani. The Corónicas Navarras place his death on V Kal Oct (27 September).) Peter was buried in San Juan de la Peña alongside his children.

In August 2026, his bones, along with those of his predecessors Ramiro I and Sancho Ramírez were removed from the monastery of San Juan de la Peña, in Santa Cruz de la Serós for safekeeping as wildfires encroached on the site.

== Sources ==
- Dunbabin, Jean (1985). France in the Making: 843-1180. Oxford University Press.

Regnal titles
Preceded by Sancho (V)	King of Aragon and Navarre; 1094–1104	Succeeded by Alfonso I
