= William VIII of Aquitaine =

Duke of Gascony (c. 1025 – 1086)

William VIII
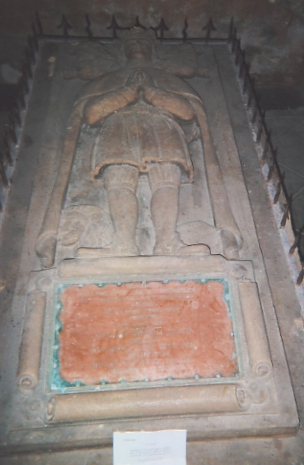

Duke of Gascony
- Reign: 1052–1086
- Predecessor: Bernard II Tumapaler
- Successor: William IX

Duke of Aquitaine
- Reign: 1058–1086
- Predecessor: William VII
- Successor: William IX
- Born: Gui-Geoffroi c. 1025; Poitiers
- Died: 25 September 1086 (aged about 61); Chizé
- Spouse: Garsende of Périgord; Matoeda; Hildegarde of Burgundy
- Issue: Agnes of Aquitaine, Queen of León and Castile; Agnes of Aquitaine, Queen of Aragon and Navarre; William IX, Duke of Aquitaine
- House: Ramnulfids
- Father: William V, Duke of Aquitaine
- Mother: Agnes of Burgundy

William VIII (c. 1025 – 25 September 1086), born Guy-Geoffrey (Gui-Geoffroi), was Duke of Gascony (1052–1086), and then Duke of Aquitaine and Count of Poitiers between 1058 and 1086, succeeding his brother William VII (Pierre-Guillaume).

== Life ==
Guy-Geoffroy was the youngest son of William V of Aquitaine by his third wife Agnes of Burgundy. He was the brother-in-law of Henry III, Holy Roman Emperor who had married his sister, Agnes de Poitou.

He became Duke of Gascony in 1052 during his older brother William VII's rule. Gascony had come to Aquitanian rule through William V's marriage to Prisca (a.k.a. Brisce) of Gascony, the sister of Duke Sans VI Guilhem of Gascony.

William VIII was one of the leaders of the allied army called to help Ramiro I of Aragon in the Siege of Barbastro (1064). This expedition was the first campaign organized by the papacy, namely Pope Alexander II, against a Muslim town and stronghold in the Emirate of Zaragoza, and the precursor of the later Crusades movement. Aragon and its allies conquered the city, killed and enslaved its inhabitants and collected an important booty.

However, Aragon lost the city again in the following years. During William VIII's rule, the alliance with the southern kingdoms of modern Spain was a political priority as shown by the marriage of all his daughters to Iberian kings.

== Marriage and children ==
William married three times and had at least five children. After he divorced his first two wives, the first due to infertility, he married a third time to a much younger woman who was also his cousin Robert I of Burgundy's daughter. This marriage produced a son, but William VIII had to visit Rome in the early 1070s to persuade the pope to recognize his children from his third marriage as legitimate.

- First wife: Garsende of Périgord, daughter of Count Aldabert II of Périgord (divorced November 1058), no children. She became a nun at Saintes.
- Second wife: Matoeda (divorced May 1068)
1. Agnes, married Alfonso VI of Castile
- Third wife: Hildegarde of Burgundy (Note: Dunbabin states Audeart of Burgundy married William.) (daughter of duke Robert I of Burgundy)
1. Agnes (died 1097), married Peter I of Aragon
2. William IX of Aquitaine, his heir
3. Hugh
4. Beatrice of Aquitaine

== Sources ==
- Bachrach, Bernard S. (1993). Fulk Nerra, the Neo-Roman Consul, 987-1040. University of California Press.
- Bouchard, Constance Brittain (2002). "Eleanor's divorce from Louis VII: The uses of Consanguinity". In Wheeler, B.; Parsons, John C. (eds.). Eleanor of Aquitaine: Lord and Lady. Palgrave Macmillan. pp. 223–236.
- Dunbabin, Jean (1985). France in the Making: 843-1180. Oxford University Press.
- O'Callaghan, Joseph F. (2013). Reconquest and Crusade in Medieval Spain. University of Pennsylvania Press.
- Reilly, Bernard F. (1992). The Contest of Christian and Muslim Spain:1031-1157. Cambridge, Mass.: Blackwell. ISBN 9780631199649.
- Stalls, Clay (2022). Possessing the Land: Aragon's Expansion Into Islam's Ebro Frontier Under Alfonso the Battler (1104–1134). Brill.

== See also ==
- Dukes of Aquitaine family tree

William VIII of Aquitaine House of Poitiers Born: c. 1025 Died: 25 September 1086
Preceded by Bernard II	Duke of Gascony; 1052–1086	Succeeded by William IX
Preceded by William VII	Duke of Aquitaine; 1058–1086	Succeeded by William IX
Preceded by William VII	Count of Poitiers; 1058–1086	Succeeded by William IX
