= Battle of Mollerussa =

1102 battle of the Iberian Reconquista

The Battle of Mollerussa (or Mollerusa) took place in the south of the county of Urgell on 11 or 14 September 1102. In the battle, Count Ermengol V was defeated and killed by an Almoravid army. Mollerussa lies halfway between Bellpuig and Lleida and is the largest town in the Pla d'Urgell.

== Background ==
The Almoravids, a Berber Maghrebi Islamic sect, had first invaded the Iberian peninsula in 1086, where they scored a victory over Castile at the Battle of Sagrajas. They only began the systematic conquest of Iberian taifas, small independent Muslim states, in 1090. The Hudid taifa of Lleida, the nearest to Urgell, paid tribute (parias) to Ermengol V. Nonetheless, the Muslim city of Balaguer, nearest to Urgell, was captured and briefly held by Viscount Guerau Ponç II de Cabrera in 1100 or 1101, before falling to the Almoravids.

== Battle ==
The brief but most detailed account of the battle is found in the Deeds of the Counts of Barcelona, the original version of which was written in the mid-12th century by an anonymous monk of Santa Maria de Ripoll, with later redactions and a Catalan translation appearing in the 14th century:

Ermengol of Mollerussa [was] so called because it was in a place called Mollerussa with the three hundred knights, it is said, and a number of other Christians that he was killed by the Almoravids, under Count Ramon Berenguer the third, in the year of Christ 1102.

Some scholars have taken this to imply that Count Ramon Berenguer III of Barcelona (ruled 1086–1131) was involved in the defeat. Two other Catalan annals from the 12th century attest to Ermengol's death at Mollerussa, without providing any other information. The Chronicon Rivipullense II, from Santa Maria de Ripoll, notes that "many died with him". The Chronicon Rotense II, written at the cathedral of Roda de Isábena, is in fact the earliest source, but provides no more than that in 1102 Ermengol died at Mollerussa. The Tunisian historian Ibn al-Kardabūs, in a passage immediately following on the Almoravid conquest of Valencia (May 1102), states that Mazdalī, acting wālī of Valencia, launched an incursion into "Barcelona". This might be the invasion that ended in the battle of Mollerussa, since the next known incursion into Catalonia took place in 1108.

Owing to the diverse and inconsistent spellings for "Mollerussa" in the medieval sources, scholars in the past have proposed that the battle at which Ermengol V was killed took place in Mayorga in the Kingdom of León or on the Muslim-controlled island of Mallorca, both far from Urgell. Recent scholarship has settled on the correctness of Mollerussa. This was proposed as early as the 18th century by Domingo de Costa y Bofarull, Memorias de la ciudad de Solsona y su Iglesia (finally published in 1959), who noted that Ermengol was interred in the cathedral of Solsona and that he had not had time to make a will, suggesting that it was not a planned expedition far from home.

The necrology of the cathedral of Solsona dates the battle to 14 September: "The eighteenth kalends of October: this day did the pagans kill the most noble Count Ermengol, who many times served God and the Blessed Mary and her clergy."

== Aftermath ==
The death of Ermengol V, following quickly on that of his wife, María Pérez, in April, left his successor, Ermengol VI, a child of no more than eight years, under the guardianship of his maternal grandparents, the Castilian count Pedro Ansúrez and his wife, Elo Alfonso. In 1105, Pedro definitively re-captured Balaguer. In 1110, the citizens of Lleida threw out their ruler and invited in the Almoravids, who thus took over most of the taifa without a battle.

== Sources ==
- Barton, Simon (1996). "The Count, the Bishop and the Abbot: Armengol VI of Urgel and the Abbey of Valladolid". The English Historical Review. 111 (440): 85–103. doi:10.1093/ehr/CXI.440.85.
- Barton, Simon (2009). A History of Spain (2nd ed.). Palgrave Macmillan.
- Barrau Dihigo, L.; Massó i Torrents, J., eds. (2007). Gesta Comitum Barcinonensium: Textos llatí i català. Barcelona.
- Brufal Sucarrat, Jesús (2007). "La sociedad almorávide en el distrito de Lérida (1102–1146): La representación del poder mediante las propiedades rurales" (PDF). Medievalismo. 17: 13–38.
- Cingolani, Stefano Maria, ed. (2008). Gestes dels comtes de Barcelona i reis d'Aragó. Valencia.
- Corredera Gutiérrez, Eduardo (1963). "Los Condes soberanos de Urgel y los Premonstratenses" (PDF). Analecta Sacra Tarraconensia. 36 (2).
- Els castells catalans. Vol. 6, part 2. Barcelona: Rafael Dalmau. 1979.
- Laliena Corbera, Carlos (2000). Pedro I de Aragón y de Navarra, 1094–1104. Editorial La Olmeda.
- Lladonosa, Josep (1974). Lérida medieval. Vol. 1. Dilagro.
- Mendonsa, Eugene L. (2008). "The Scripting of Domination in Medieval Catalonia: An Anthropological View". Carolina Academic Press.
- Miret i Sans, Joaquim (1904). "La casa condal de Urgell en Provenza". Butlletí de la Reial Acadèmia de Bones Lletres de Barcelona. 2 (9).
- Mora Giné, Xavier (2010). Un poble del comtat d ́Urgell: Alberola. Edicions de la Universitat de Lleida.
- Reilly, B. F. (1993). The Medieval Spains. Cambridge University Press.
- Reilly, B. F. (2008). "The Rediscovery of Count Pedro Ansúrez". In Simon Barton; Peter Linehan (eds.). Cross, Crescent and Conversion: Studies on Medieval Spain and Christendom in Memory of Richard Fletcher. Leiden: Brill. pp. 109–26.
- Villanueva, Jaime (1976). Memorias cronológicas de los condes de Urgel. Balaguer.
