= Guel =

Guel may refer to:

== People ==
- Michele Guel, American cybersecurity engineer
- Moussa Guel (born 1999), Ivorian football player
- Tchiressoua Guel (born 1975), Ivorian football player

== Places ==
- Güel, Spain
