= Torre de Ésera =

- Locality
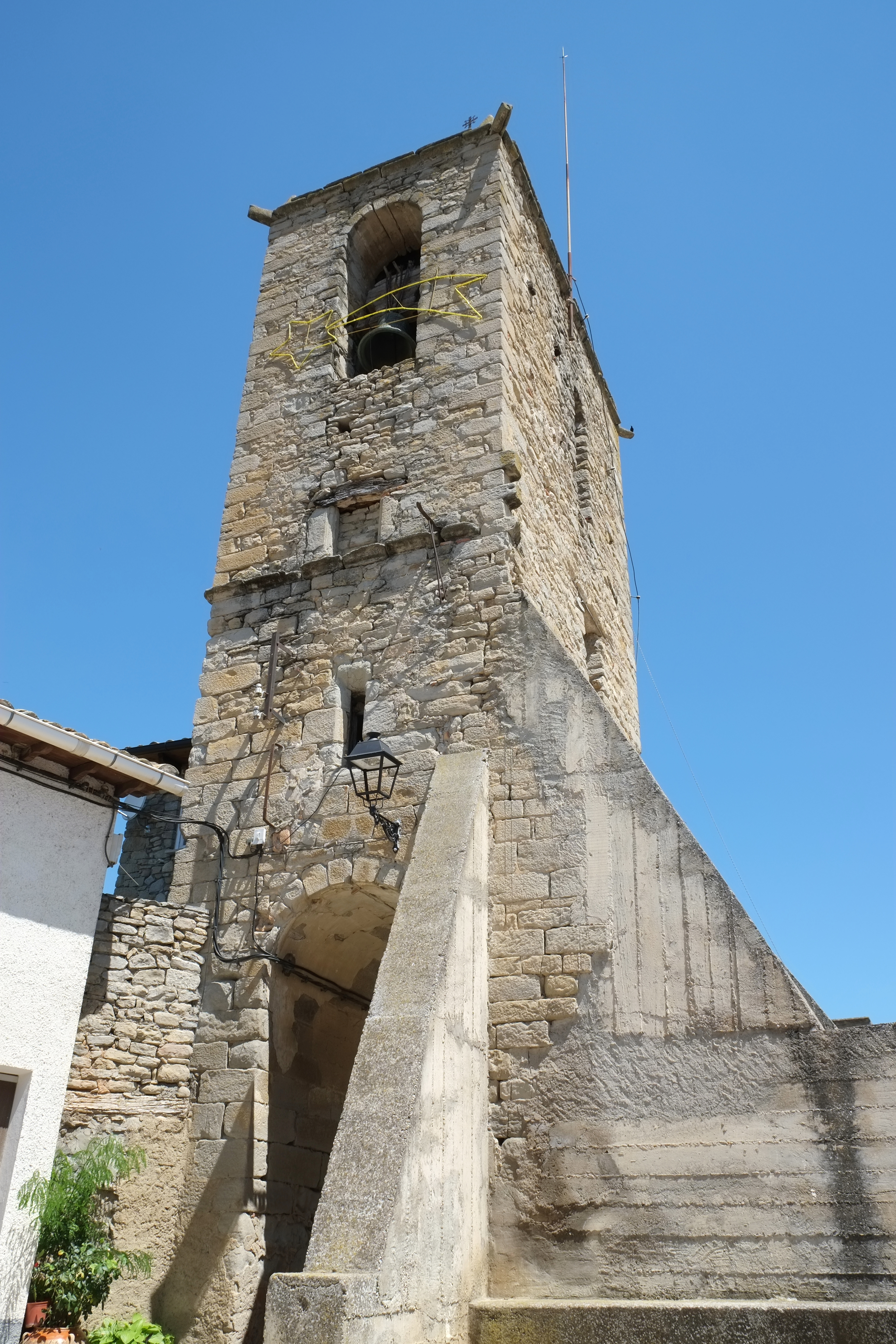

- Location within Aragon Location within Spain
- Coordinates: 42°12′47″N 0°21′13″E
- Country: Spain
- Autonomous community: Aragon
- Province: Province of Huesca
- Municipality: Graus
- Elevation: 493 m (1,617 ft)

Population
  - Total: 53

Torre de Ésera is a locality located in the municipality of Graus, in Huesca province, Aragon, Spain. As of 2020, it has a population of 53.

== Geography ==
Torre de Ésera is located 90km east of Huesca.
