= Benavente de Aragón =

- Locality
- Location within Aragon Location within Spain
- Coordinates: 42°13′26″N 0°22′54″E
- Country: Spain
- Autonomous community: Aragon
- Province: Province of Huesca
- Municipality: Graus
- Elevation: 579 m (1,900 ft)

Population
  - Total: 27

Benavente de Aragón is a locality located in the municipality of Graus, in Huesca province, Aragon, Spain. As of 2020, it has a population of 27.

== Geography ==
Benavente de Aragón is located 94km east of Huesca.
