= Chuseu =

- Locality
- Juseu
- Location within Aragon Location within Spain
- Coordinates: 42°5′34″N 0°22′36″E
- Country: Spain
- Autonomous community: Aragon
- Province: Province of Huesca
- Municipality: Graus
- Elevation: 774 m (2,539 ft)

Population
  - Total: 19

Chuseu or Juseu is a locality located in the municipality of Graus, in Huesca province, Aragon, Spain. As of 2020, it has a population of 19.

== Geography ==
Chuseu is located 89km east of Huesca.
