= Centenera (Graus) =

- Locality
- Location within Aragon Location within Spain
- Coordinates: 42°16′59″N 0°23′25″E
- Country: Spain
- Autonomous community: Aragon
- Province: Province of Huesca
- Municipality: Graus
- Elevation: 677 m (2,221 ft)

Population
  - Total: 15

Centenera is a locality located in the municipality of Graus, in Huesca province, Aragon, Spain. As of 2020, it has a population of 15.

== Geography ==
Centenera is located 101km east-northeast of Huesca.
