= El Soler (Graus) =

- Locality
- Location within Aragon Location within Spain
- Coordinates: 42°12′36″N 0°27′20″E
- Country: Spain
- Autonomous community: Aragon
- Province: Province of Huesca
- Municipality: Graus
- Elevation: 538 m (1,765 ft)

Population
  - Total: 20

El Soler is a hamlet located in the municipality of Graus, in Huesca province, Aragon, Spain. As of 2020, it has a population of 20.

== Geography ==
El Soler is located 97km east of Huesca.
