= Pueyo de Marguillén =

- Locality
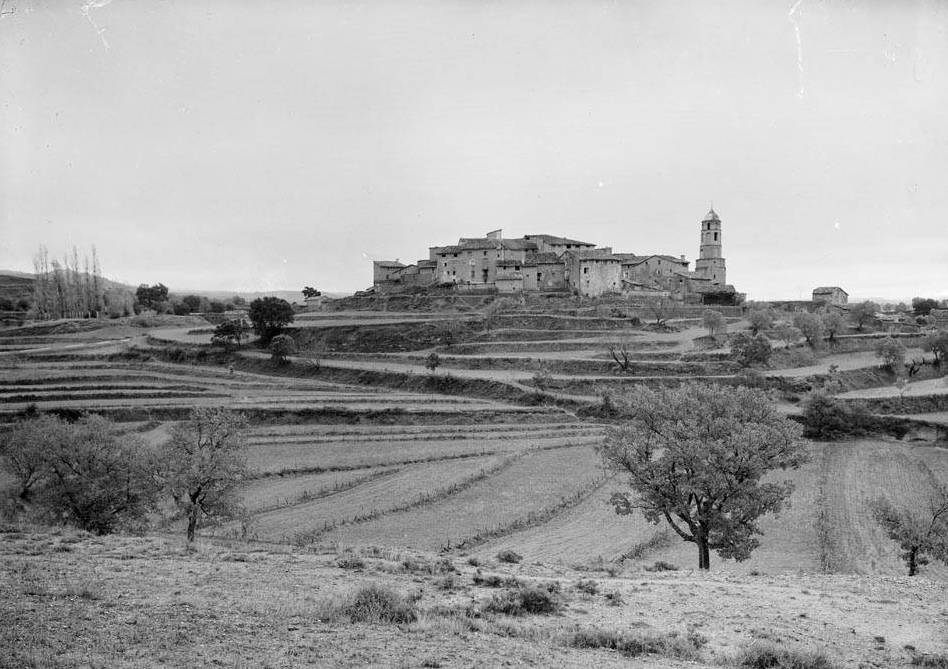

- Location within Aragon Location within Spain
- Coordinates: 42°8′30″N 0°21′46″E
- Country: Spain
- Autonomous community: Aragon
- Province: Province of Huesca
- Municipality: Graus
- Elevation: 532 m (1,745 ft)

Population
  - Total: 27

Pueyo de Marguillén is a hamlet located in the municipality of Graus, in Huesca province, Aragon, Spain. As of 2020, it has a population of 27.

== Geography ==
Pueyo de Marguillén is located 85km east of Huesca.
