= Bertha of Aragon =

Queen of Navarre from 1097 to 1104

Bertha (c. 1075 – bef. 1111) was a Queen consort of Aragon and Navarre. Nothing is known about her childhood or the names of her parents.

She was married to Peter I of Aragon in 1097, shortly after the death of his first wife, Agnes of Aquitaine, with whom he had two children: Peter and Isabella. Bertha and Peter had no children.

Peter and Isabella were both dead by 1104 and King Peter needed an heir. They had no children and Peter died the following year. The crown of Aragon and Navarre passed to his half-brother Alfonso.

Bertha got a dower but Alfonso got all of Peter's lands. It is unknown when Bertha died or where she died.

Genealogist Szabolcs de Vajay has speculated that Bertha may have been the daughter of Peter I, Count of Savoy, and another Agnes of Aquitaine, perhaps the Agnes who was the final wife of Peter's grandfather Ramiro I of Aragon and first cousin of Peter's own first wife.

Bertha of Aragon Jiménez dynasty Born: circa 1075 Died: before 1111
Royal titles
Preceded by Agnes of Aquitaine	Queen consort of Aragon and Navarre; 1097–1104	Succeeded by Urraca of León and Castile
