= Aguinalíu =

- Locality
- Aguinaliu
- Location within Aragon Location within Spain
- Coordinates: 42°5′47″N 0°20′18″E
- Country: Spain
- Autonomous community: Aragon
- Province: Province of Huesca
- Municipality: Graus
- Elevation: 653 m (2,142 ft)

Population
  - Total: 19

Aguinalíu or Aguinaliu is a locality located in the municipality of Graus, in Huesca province, Aragon, Spain. As of 2020, it has a population of 19.

== Geography ==
Aguinalíu is located 86km east of Huesca.
