= Torres del Obispo =

- Locality
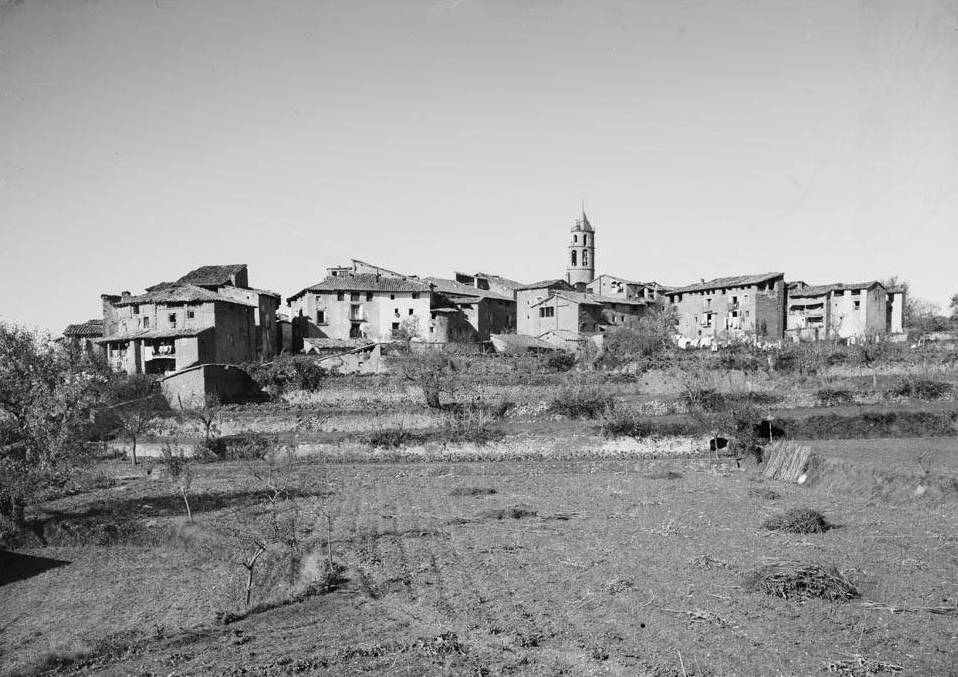

- Location within Aragon Location within Spain
- Coordinates: 42°7′50″N 0°22′44″E
- Country: Spain
- Autonomous community: Aragon
- Province: Province of Huesca
- Municipality: Graus
- Elevation: 536 m (1,759 ft)

Population
  - Total: 146

Torres del Obispo is a hamlet located in the municipality of Graus, in Huesca province, Aragon, Spain. As of 2020, it has a population of 146.

== Geography ==
Torres del Obispo is located 85km east of Huesca.
