= Crusade of Barbastro =

1064 siege

- Part of the Reconquista
Date	August 1064
Location	Al-Barbitanya, Emirate of Lārida; today's Barbastro, Spain 42°2′10″N 0°7′35″E
Result	Frankish victory

Belligerents
Kingdom of Aragon; County of Urgell; Duchy of Aquitaine; Papal states	Emirate of Lārida

Commanders and leaders
Arnau Mir de Tost; William VIII of Aquitaine; Williame fitz Williame	Amir Yusuf al-Muzzaffar
- Location within Spain

The crusade of Barbastro (also known as the siege of Barbastro or battle of Barbastro) was an international expedition, sanctioned by Pope Alexander II, to take the Spanish city of Barbastro, then part of the Hudid Emirate of Lārida. A large army composed of elements from all over Western Europe took part in the siege and conquest of the city (1064). The nature of the expedition, famously described by Ramón Menéndez Pidal as "a crusade before the crusades", is discussed in historiography, and the crusading element of the campaign is still a disputed point.

== Expedition ==
Pope Alexander II first preached the Reconquista in 1063 as a "Christian emergency." It was also preached in Burgundy, probably with the permission or participation of Hugh of Cluny, where the abbot's brother, Thomas de Chalon, led the army. Certainly zeal for the crusade spread elsewhere in France, for Amatus of Montecassino notes that the "grand chivalry of the French and Burgundians and other peoples" (grant chevalerie de Francoiz et de Borguegnons et d'autre gent) was present at the siege.

Thus, a large army was present at the siege when it began in 1064 primarily of Frenchmen and Burgundians, along with a contingent of Italians, made up mostly of Normans, as well as a local Spanish army made up of Catalans and Aragonese. Later, these Catalan and Aragonese soldiers would be disgusted by the crimes committed by those Normans after the capture of the city.

The leader of the papal contingent was a Norman by the name of William of Montreuil. The leader of the Spaniards was Sancho Ramírez, King of Aragón and Navarre, whose realm was greatly threatened by the Moors to the south. The largest component, the Aquitainian, was led by Duke William VIII of Aquitaine (known as Guy-Geoffrey), whom one historian calls the "Christian generalissimo". Though the makeup of this grand army has been subject to much dispute, that it contained a large force of Frankish knights is generally agreed upon.

The duke of Aquitaine led the army through the Pyrenees at Somport. He joined the Catalan army at Girona early in 1064. The entire army then marched past Graus, which had resisted assault twice before, and moved against Barbastro, then part of the taifa of Lleida ruled by Al-Muzaffar. The city was besieged for forty days until it surrendered according to both Muslim and Christian sources.

Aside from William of Montreuil and Guy-Geoffrey, a 1078 story about the Normans placed Robert Crispin as the leader of the campaign. However, it is more likely that he was the leader of the contingent of Normans who participated in the campaign.

== Consequences ==
Terms were given by the Christians to spare the lives of the Muslims and respect their properties, but the pact was quickly broken. Another source tells that the garrison offered to surrender their property and property of their families in exchange for letting them leave the town, and so it was agreed with the besiegers. However, the Crusaders did not honour the treaty and killed the soldiers as they came out. Crusade soldiers plundered and sacked the city without mercy. It is said fifty thousand Muslims were killed or captured and the victors divided an enormous amount of booty. The contemporary Muslim chronicles suggest the invading forces might have slain the adult men and enslaved women and children; the numbers however are greatly exaggerated: Barbastro would hardly reach a population of eight thousand in those times.

The Andalusi Muslim jurist Ibn 'Abd al-Barr, among the witnesses of the fall of Barbastro, described the aftermath as follows:

What can be your opinion, Oh Muslims, when you see masajid and oratories, that once were witness to the recitation of the Qur’ān and the sweetness of the call to prayer; immersed in širk and slander, loaded with bells and crosses, in the place of the followers of ar-Raḥmān: aʼimmah and pious men, vergers and muʾaḏḏinūn...are dragged away by the kuffār like animals for sacrifice, they are brought to the butcher; they prostrate themselves humbly in the masajid which are then burnt and reduced to ashes while the kuffār laugh and insult us, and our Dīn wails and weeps.

The plight of women seems to have been particularly difficult as a consequence of the siege and victory of the crusaders. Many died during the siege of thirst-related diseases and were subjected to degrading treatment after victory, converting them into servants and slaves, or sometimes even exposing them to the torture of their husbands.

The crusaders made off with a huge booty. Al-Bakri's Kitab al-Masālik wa-l-mamālik ('Book of Highways and Kingdoms', written 1067–8) records the capture of a good many Saracen girls and Saracen treasures. Armengol III of Urgel, the brother-in-law of King Sancho Ramírez, was entrusted with the government of the city. On 17 April 1065, after roughly ten months of occupation, the Moors easily retook the city. Thibaut, the Burgundian leader, died, possibly of wounds received on campaign, while returning to France after the loss of the city in 1065.

== Historiography ==
Historian Reinhart Dozy first began a study of the War in the mid-nineteenth century based on the scarce primary sources, mainly Amatus and Ibn Hayyan. Dozy first suggested the participation of a papal element based on Ibn Hayyan's reference to the "cavalry of Rome." Subsequent historiography has stressed the Cluniac element in the War, primarily the result of Ferdinand I of León's recent attempts to introduce the Cluniac reform to Spain and inspired by the death of Ramiro I of Aragon following the failed siege of Graus.

This interpretation has been criticized in more recent decades, especially the papal connection and Italian involvement. It has been suggested that Alexander was preoccupied with the Antipope Cadalus at the time and did not preach a plenary indulgence for warriors of the Reconquista until the 1073 campaign of Ebles II of Roucy. It has also been theorized that it was not William of Montreuil, but Guy Geoffrey, who was the "Roman" leader implied by Ibn Hayyan.

== Sources ==
- Ayala Martínez, Carlos de (2011). "Fernando I y la sacralización de la Reconquista". Anales de la Universidad de Alicante. Historia Medieval (17): 67–115. doi:10.14198/medieval.2011.17.04. hdl:10045/25667. ISSN 0212-2480.
- al-Bakri (1992). "Kitab al-Masālik wa-l-mamālik". In Melville, Charles; Ubaydli, Ahmad (eds.). Christians and Moors in Spain. Vol. III: Arabic Sources. Oxford: Aris & Phillips. pp. 70–71. ISBN 978-0-856684-50-0.
- Bishko, Charles Julian (1969). "Fernando I and the Origins of the Leonese–Castilian Alliance with Cluny". Cuadernos de Historia de España. 48.
- Boissonnade, Pierre (1932). "Cluny, la papauté et la première grande croisade internationale contre les sarrasins d'Espagne: Barbastro (1064–1065)". Revue des Questions Historiques. 60: 257–301.
- Bull, Marcus Graham (1993). Knightly Piety and the Lay Response to the First Crusade: The Limousin and Gascony, c. 970–c. 1130. Clarendon Press.
- Canellas López, Ángel (1951). "Las cruzadas de Aragón en el siglo XI". Argensola: Revista de Ciencias Sociales del Instituto de Estudios Altoaragoneses. 7: 217–28. ISSN 0518-4088.
- Chaytor, Henry John (1933). A History of Aragon and Catalonia. London: Methuen & Co.
- Ferreiro, Alberto (1983). "The Siege of Barbastro, 1064–65: A Reassessment". Journal of Medieval History. 9 (2): 129–44. doi:10.1016/0304-4181(83)90005-2.
- Ibn Hayyan (1981). "La Cruzada contra Barbastro (1064)". In Ubieto Arteta, Antonio (ed.). Historia de Aragón: La formación territorial. Anubar Ediciones. pp. 53–67. ISBN 978-8470131813.
- Lapeña Paul, Ana Isabel (2004). Sancho Ramírez, rey de Aragón (¿1064?-1094) y rey de Navarra (1076-1094) (in Spanish). Gijón: Ediciones Trea. ISBN 978-84-9704-123-2.
- Marín-Guzmán, Roberto (1992). "Crusade in al-Andalus: The Eleventh Century Formation of the Reconquista as an Ideology". Islamic Studies. 31 (3): 287–318.
- Menéndez Pidal, Ramón (1971). The Cid and his Spain. Translated by Harold Sunderland. London: F. Cass.
- O'Callaghan, Joseph F. (1983). A History of Medieval Spain. Ithaca, NY: Cornell University Press.
- Rodríguez García, José Manuel (2000). "Historiografía de las Cruzadas" (PDF). Espacio, Tiempo y Forma. Serie III, Historia Medieval. 13: 341–395.
- Sarrió Cucarella, Diego (2012). "Corresponding across Religious Borders: Al-Bājī's Response to a Missionary Letter from France". Medieval Encounters. 18 (1): 1–35. doi:10.1163/157006712X634549.
- Ubieto Arteta, Antonio (1981). Historia de Aragón (in Spanish). Zaragoza: Anubar. ISBN 978-8470131813.
- Villegas-Aristizábal, Lucas (2007). Norman and Anglo-Norman Participation in the Iberian Reconquista (PDF) (Ph.D.). University of Nottingham. Archived from the original (PDF) on 2011-07-18.
- Bosch i Vilá, Jacinto (1970). "De nuevo sobre Barbastro, 1064–1065: Nuevos aspectos y precisiones sobre la conquista cristiana y la reconquista musulmana". Biblos. 46: 225–33.
- Villegas-Aristizábal, Lucas, "Pope Gregory VII and Count Eblous II of Roucy’s Proto-Crusade in Iberia c. 1073", Medieval History Journal 21.1 (2018), 1-24. http://journals.sagepub.com/doi/abs/10.1177/0971945817750508
