= Hildegarde of Burgundy =

Duchess consort of Gascony and Aquitaine
- Tenure: c. 1068/9 - 25 September
- Born: c. 1056
- Died: 1104
- Spouse: William VIII, Duke of Aquitaine
- Issue: William IX, Duke of Aquitaine; Agnes of Aquitaine, Queen of Aragon and Navarre; Beatrice
- House: House of Burgundy
- Father: Robert I, Duke of Burgundy
- Mother: Ermengarde of Anjou, Duchess of Burgundy

Hildegarde of Burgundy (c. 1056 – 1104) was Duchess consort of Gascony and Aquitaine by marriage to William VIII, Duke of Aquitaine.

== Life ==
Hildegarde was the daughter of Robert I, Duke of Burgundy with his second wife, Ermengarde of Anjou.

=== Marriage and issue ===
Hildegarde married William VIII, Duke of Aquitaine. She was, by marriage, Duchess of Gascony and Aquitaine.

William and Hildegarde had:

- William IX, Duke of Aquitaine
- Agnes of Aquitaine, Queen of Aragon and Navarre, married Peter of Aragon
- Beatrice? married firstly to Alfonso VI of Leon and Castile and secondly to Elias I, Count of Maine

William's birth was a cause of great celebration at the Aquitanian court, but the Church at first considered him illegitimate because of his parents' consanguinity. This obliged his father to make a pilgrimage to Rome soon after his birth to seek papal approval of his marriage to Hildegarde.

== Sources ==
- Bouchard, Constance Brittain (2002). "Eleanor's divorce from Louis VII: The uses of Consanguinity". In Wheeler, B.; Parsons, John C. (eds.). Eleanor of Aquitaine: Lord and Lady. Palgrave Macmillan. pp. 223–236. ISBN 978-0-312-29582-0.
- Crisp, Ryan Patrick (2005). "Consanguinity and the Saint-Aubin Genealogies". In Morillo, Stephen (ed.). The Haskins Society Journal 14 2003. Studies in Medieval History. The Boydell Press. pp. 105–116. ISBN 1 84383 116 3.
- Dunbabin, Jean (1985). France in the Making: 843-1180. Oxford University Press. ISBN 0-19-873031-4.
