= La Puebla de Fantova =

- Locality
- Location within Aragon Location within Spain
- Coordinates: 42°15′33″N 0°23′52″E
- Country: Spain
- Autonomous community: Aragon
- Province: Province of Huesca
- Municipality: Graus
- Elevation: 706 m (2,316 ft)

Population
  - Total: 108

La Puebla de Fantova is a locality located in the municipality of Graus, in Huesca province, Aragon, Spain. As of 2020, it has a population of 108.

== Geography ==
La Puebla de Fantova is located 97km east-northeast of Huesca.
