= Aguilar (Graus) =

- Locality
- Location within Aragon Location within Spain
- Coordinates: 42°19′7″N 0°23′16″E
- Country: Spain
- Autonomous community: Aragon
- Province: Province of Huesca
- Municipality: Graus
- Elevation: 960 m (3,150 ft)

Population
  - Total: 0

Aguilar is a locality located in the municipality of Graus, in Huesca province, Aragon, Spain. As of 2020, it has a population of 0.
