= Battle of Graus =

Battle in Spain in the 1060s

Coordinates: 42°11′N 0°20′E

- Part of the Reconquista
Date	1063
Location	Graus, Taifa of Zaragoza (modern-day Spain)
Result	Castilian–Zaragozan victory

Belligerents
Kingdom of Aragon	Kingdom of Castile; Taifa of Zaragoza

Commanders and leaders
Ramiro I of Aragon †	Sancho the Strong; Al-Muktadir of Zaragoza; El Cid

The Battle of Graus was a battle of the Reconquista, traditionally said to have taken place on 8 May 1063. Either in or as a result of the battle, King Ramiro I of Aragon died.

Antonio Ubieto Arteta, in his Historia de Aragón, re-dated the battle to 1069. The late twelfth-century Chronica naierensis dates the encounter to 1070.

Ramiro's first attempt to take Graus, the northernmost Muslim outpost in the valley of the Cinca, took place in 1055, probably in response to the defeat of García Sánchez III of Navarre at Atapuerca the year before (1054), which placed Ferdinand I of León and Castile in a commanding position against Ramiro's western border and the Muslim Taifa of Zaragoza to his south. His first expedition against Graus failed, and in 1059 Ferdinand succeeded in extorting parias (tribute) from Zaragoza. Ramiro marched on Graus again in the spring of 1063, but this time the Zaragozans had with them 300 Castilian knights under the infante Sancho the Strong and (possibly) his general Rodrigo Díaz de Vivar, better known as El Cid. The presence of the Cid at the battle is based on a single source, the generally reliable Historia Roderici, which alleges that he was the alférez of Sancho at the time. Considering the rarity of the Cid's name in the documents of the early 1060s, this is unlikely.

The circumstances of the actual battle are obscure. Reinhart Dozy argued that Ramiro survived four months after the battle and that neither the Cid nor Sancho took any part in it. The Fragmentum historicum ex cartulario Alaonis records only that occisus est a mauris in bello apud Gradus (he [Ramiro] was killed by the Moors in war near Graus), with no mention of the Castilians. The aforementioned Chronica naierensis contains an account generally, though not universally, regarded as a legend: that Sancho Garcés, an illegitimate son of García Sánchez III of Navarre, eloped with the daughter of García's wife, Stephanie (probably by an earlier marriage), who was the fiancée of the Castilian infante Sancho, and that he sought refuge at the court first of Zaragoza, then later of Aragon. Sancho, to avenge the disruption of his marriage plans, marched against Ramiro and Zaragoza, and Ramiro died in the encounter near "the place called Graus" (loco qui Gradus dicitur) in 1064 or 1070. According to the Arabic historian al-Turtūshī, Ramiro (misidentified as "Ibn Rudmīr", the son of Ramiro) was assassinated by a Muslim soldier who spoke the Christians' language and infiltrated the Aragonese camp.

Charles Bishko, summarising the position of Pierre Boissonnade, explains how the battle of Graus gave impetus to the War of Barbastro of the next year:

. . . the expedition against Barbastro is above all a French crusade, inspired by Cluny and launched through Cluny's persuasion by the papacy of Alexander II, the purpose of which is to preserve a hard-pressed Aragonese kingdom from imminent invasion and possible destruction at the hands of the Muslims, following Ramiro I's shattering defeat and death at Graus on 8 May 1063. Graus, in this Hispanic prelude to the Palestinian gesta Dei per Francos, serves as an Iberian Manzikert, with King Sancho Ramírez—like the legates of the Emperor Alexius Comnenus at Piacenza—appealing in desperation for papal and Frankish succor. . .

Graus was finally taken by Sancho Ramírez, Ramiro's successor, in 1083.
