= Ejep =

- Locality
- Location within Aragon Location within Spain
- Coordinates: 42°14′55″N 0°19′19″E
- Country: Spain
- Autonomous community: Aragon
- Province: Province of Huesca
- Municipality: Graus
- Elevation: 737 m (2,418 ft)

Population
  - Total: 14

Ejep is a locality located in the municipality of Graus, in Huesca province, Aragon, Spain. As of 2020, it has a population of 14.

== Geography ==
Ejep is located 95km east-northeast of Huesca.
