= Abenozas =

- Locality
- Location within Aragon Location within Spain
- Coordinates: 42°18′44″N 0°25′23″E
- Country: Spain
- Autonomous community: Aragon
- Province: Province of Huesca
- Municipality: Graus
- Elevation: 1,094 m (3,589 ft)

Population
  - Total: 1

Abenozas is a locality located in the municipality of Graus, in Huesca province, Aragon, Spain. As of 2020, it has a population of 1.

== Geography ==
Abenozas is located 108 km east-northeast of Huesca.
