= Las Ventas de Santa Lucía =

- Locality
- Location within Aragon Location within Spain
- Coordinates: 42°13′40″N 0°21′16″E
- Country: Spain
- Autonomous community: Aragon
- Province: Province of Huesca
- Municipality: Graus
- Elevation: 490 m (1,610 ft)

Population
  - Total: 28

Las Ventas de Santa Lucía is a hamlet located in the municipality of Graus, in Huesca province, Aragon, Spain. As of 2020, it has a population of 28.

== Geography ==
Las Ventas de Santa Lucía is located 91km east of Huesca.
