= Bellestar (Graus) =

- Locality
- Location within Aragon Location within Spain
- Coordinates: 42°13′48″N 0°23′48″E
- Country: Spain
- Autonomous community: Aragon
- Province: Province of Huesca
- Municipality: Graus
- Elevation: 631 m (2,070 ft)

Population
  - Total: 28

Bellestar is a locality located in the municipality of Graus, in Huesca province, Aragon, Spain. As of 2020, it has a population of 28.

== Geography ==
Bellestar is located 95km east of Huesca.
