= Agnes of Aquitaine, Queen of Aragon and Navarre =

Queen of Aragon and Navarre from 1094 to 1097

Agnes of Aquitaine

Queen consort of Aragon and Navarre
- Tenure: 4 June 1094–6 June 1097
- Born: 1072
- Died: 6 June 1097 (aged 24–25)
- Burial: Pantheon of Kings of San Juan de la Peña
- Spouse: Peter I of Aragon and Pamplona
- Issue: Peter; Isabella
- House: Ramnulfids
- Father: William VIII, Duke of Aquitaine
- Mother: Hildegarde of Burgundy

Agnes of Aquitaine (end of 1072 – 6 June 1097) was a queen consort of Navarre. She was a daughter of William VIII, Duke of Aquitaine, and his third wife, Hildegarde of Burgundy.

In 1081, Agnes was betrothed to Peter I of Aragon and Navarre. In 1086, the couple married in Jaca; upon Peter's succession, Agnes became queen of Aragon and Navarre. By him, Agnes had two children, both of whom predeceased their father: Peter (died 1103) and Isabella (died 1104).

Agnes died in 1097, and her husband remarried to a woman named Bertha.

== Sources ==
- Dunbabin, Jean (2000). France in the Making 843-1180. Oxford University Press.

Agnes of Aquitaine, Queen of Aragon and Navarre House of Poitiers Born: circa 1072 Died: 6 June 1097
Royal titles
Preceded by Felicia of Roucy	Queen consort of Aragon and Navarre; 1094–1097	Succeeded by Bertha
