= La Puebla del Mon =

- Locality
- Location within Aragon Location within Spain
- Coordinates: 42°9′34″N 0°22′6″E
- Country: Spain
- Autonomous community: Aragon
- Province: Province of Huesca
- Municipality: Graus
- Elevation: 620 m (2,030 ft)

Population
  - Total: 2

La Puebla del Mon is a hamlet that is located in the municipality of Graus, in the Huesca province of Aragon, Spain. As of 2020, it had a population of 2.

== Geography ==
La Puebla del Mon is located 88km east of Huesca.
