= Torre de Obato =

- Locality
- Location within Aragon Location within Spain
- Coordinates: 42°14′0″N 0°20′39″E
- Country: Spain
- Autonomous community: Aragon
- Province: Province of Huesca
- Municipality: Graus
- Elevation: 574 m (1,883 ft)

Population
  - Total: 18

Torre de Obato is a hamlet located in the municipality of Graus, in Huesca province, Aragon, Spain. As of 2020, it has a population of 18.

== Geography ==
Torre de Obato is located 92km east of Huesca.
