= Torrelabad =

- Locality
- Location within Aragon Location within Spain
- Coordinates: 42°12′46″N 0°25′48″E
- Country: Spain
- Autonomous community: Aragon
- Province: Province of Huesca
- Municipality: Graus
- Elevation: 576 m (1,890 ft)

Population
  - Total: 19

Torrelabad is a hamlet located in the municipality of Graus, in Huesca province, Aragon, Spain. As of 2020, it has a population of 19.

== Geography ==
Torrelabad is located 96km east of Huesca.
