= Güel =

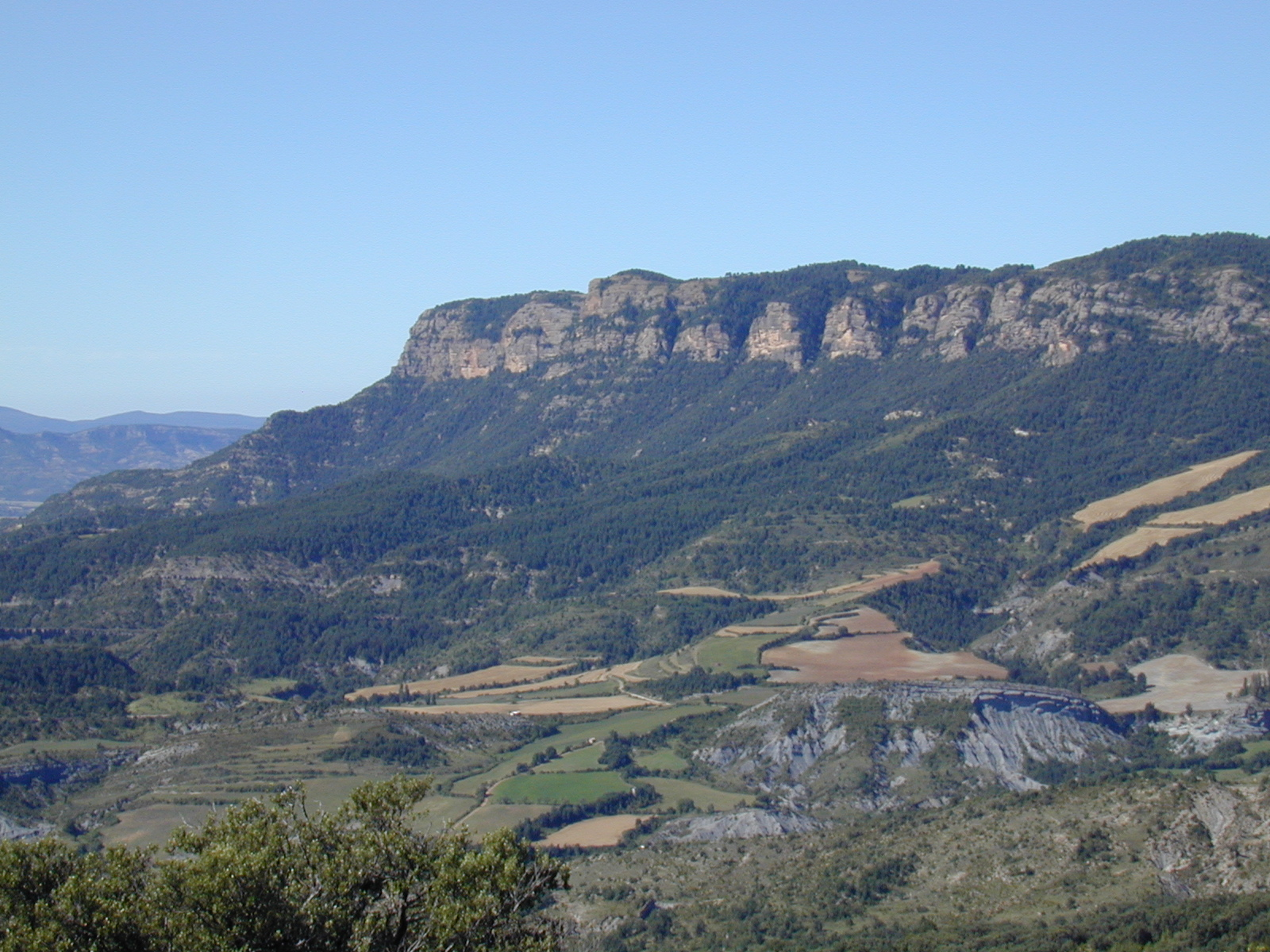
Morrón de Güell, serra d'Esdolomada

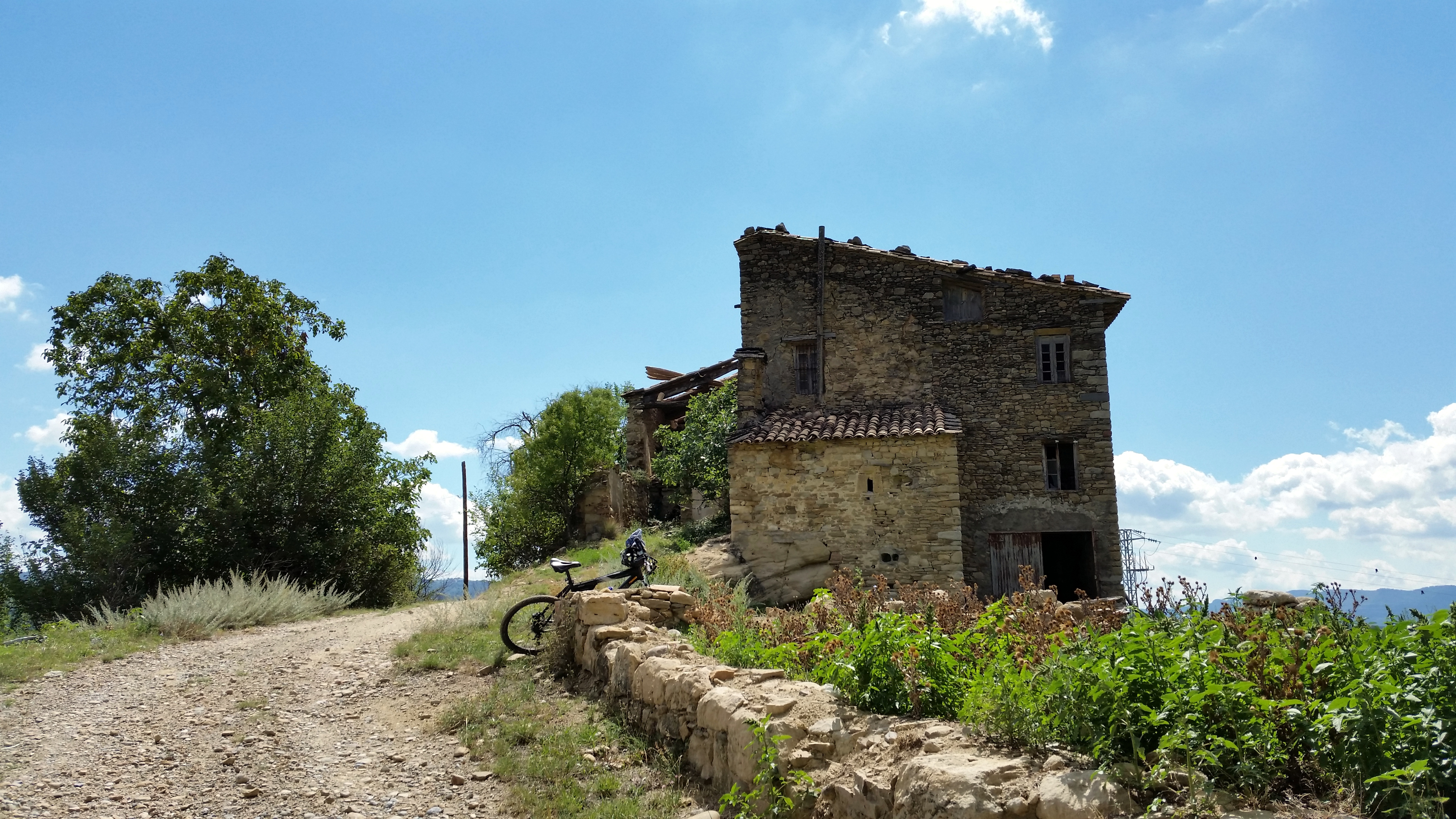
Casa Campo

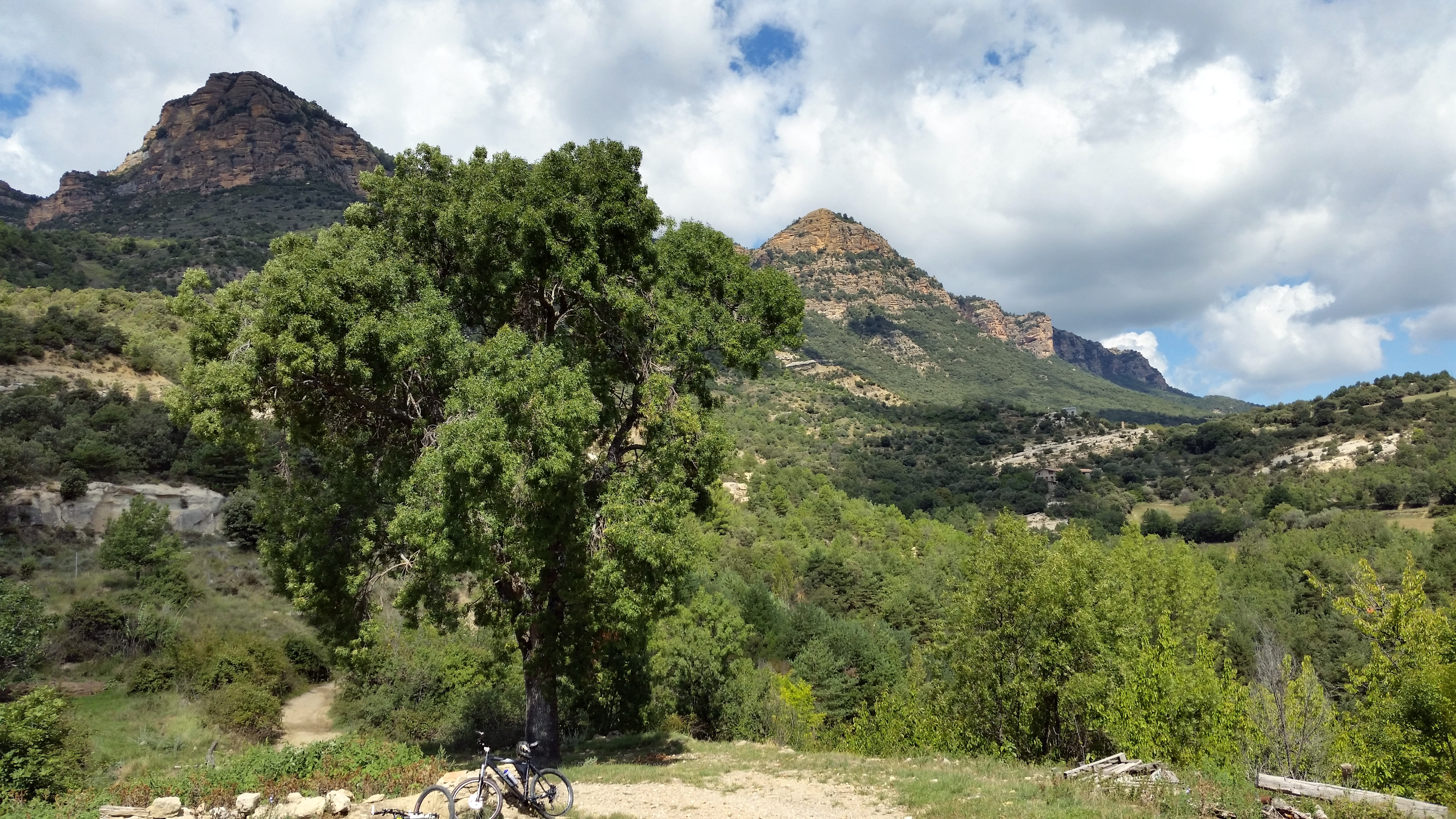
Morrons de Güel from Casa Campo

Güel is an old hamlet in the Ribagorça county in Huesca, Spain. It became part of Graus in 1972 (Decret 3357/71, of December 23rd).

It is located at the right side of Isavena river. In the north side there are the Güel mountains (max. 1.401 m), that are also called Morrons de güel.

== Hamlet houses ==
Güel has an sparse habitat made out of isolated houses, some of them are:

- Les caserias de la Badia.
- Casa Campo 42°16′17.04″N 0°29′53.66″E
- El Castell.
- La Collada, caseria.
- Farrerós.
- Julià.
- La Mançana, at right of Isàvena river .
- Peregrí.
- Picontor, house with a romanic chapel (Sant Crist).
- Remorosa, house with a chapel (Santa Anna).
- La Ribera, at right of Isàvena river.
- El Pueio.
- El Rincó.
- Solano, house with a chapel Sant Joan & Santa Anna.
- Trespueio, house with a chapel (capella de la Trinitat).
