= Almenar =

- Municipality
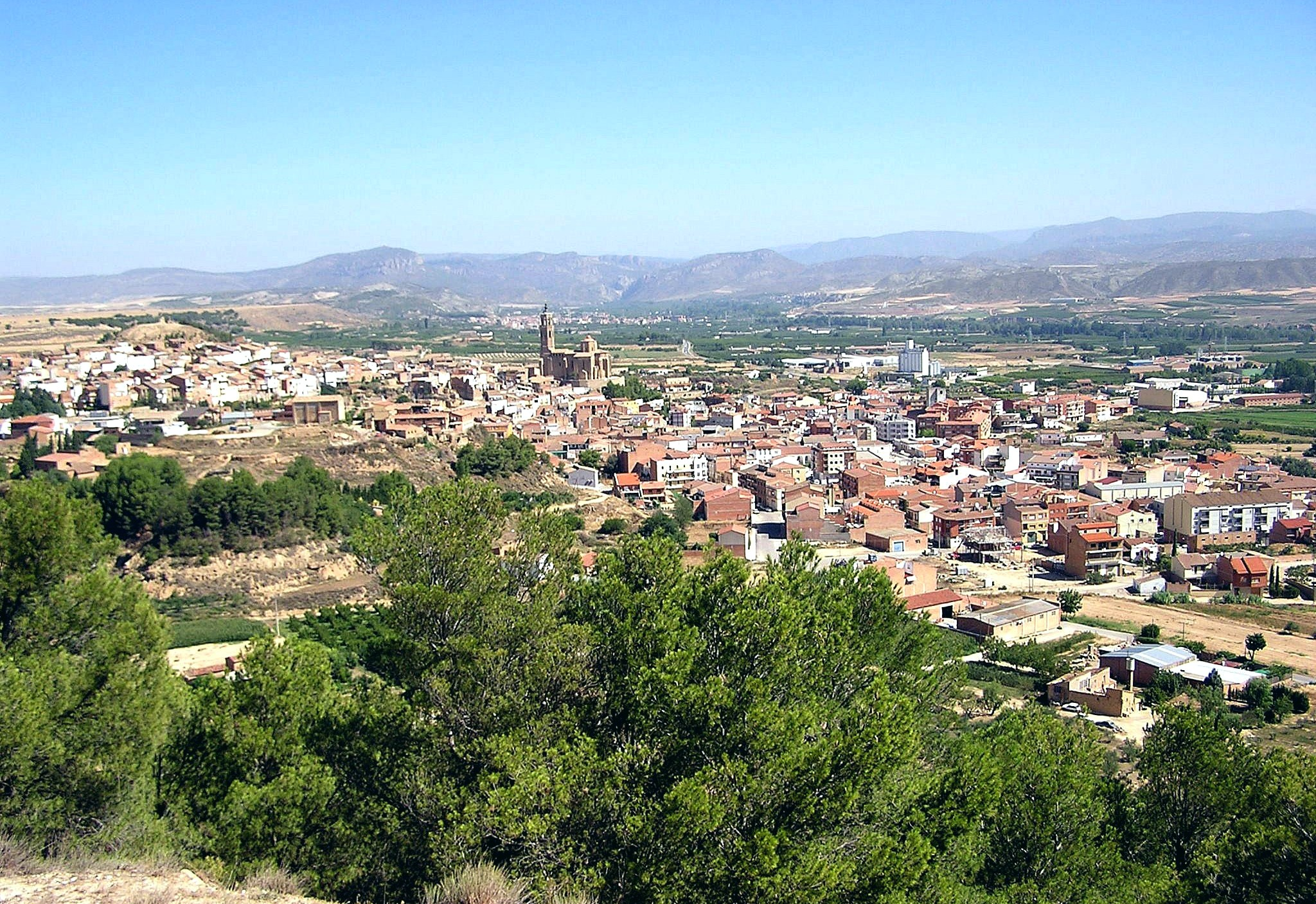
- Almenar

- Coat of arms

- Location in Catalonia
- Coordinates: 41°47′55″N 0°34′08″E
- Country: Spain
- Community: Catalonia
- Province: Lleida
- Comarca: Segrià

Government
  - mayor: Ma. Teresa Malla Aige (2015)

Area
  - Total: 66.6 km^{2} (25.7 sq mi)
- Elevation: 329 m (1,079 ft)

Population (2025-01-01)
  - Total: 3,369
  - Density: 50.6/km^{2} (131/sq mi)
- Demonyms: Almenarenc, almenarenca
- Postal code: 25021
- Website: almenar.ddl.net

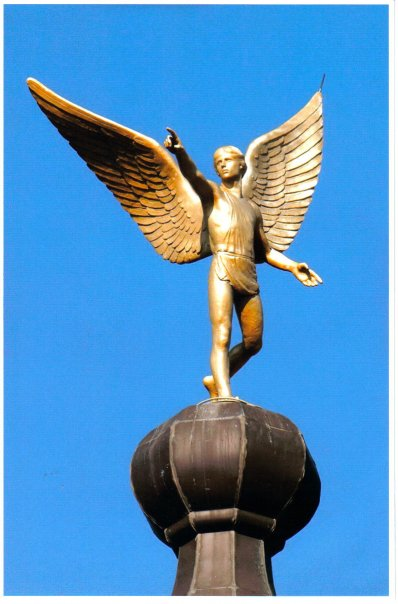
Angel on top of the church spire. Almenar main church

Almenar (Catalan pronunciation: [almeˈna]) is a municipality in the comarca of the Segrià in Catalonia, Spain. The Battle of Almenar, one of the main battles of the War of the Spanish Succession, was fought in the hills close to this town on 27 July 1710.

It has a population of 3,369 (register office, 2025).

== Demography ==
1900	1930	1950	1970	1986	2006
2260	2780	2883	3784	n/a	3576

== See also ==
- Battle of Almenar
