= Parias =

Tribute in medieval Iberia

Map (in Spanish) of the taifa kingdoms and the Christians states at the time of the breakup of the Caliphate (1031).

In medieval Spain, parias (from medieval Latin pariāre, "to make equal [an account]", i.e. pay) were a form of tribute paid by the taifas of al-Andalus to the Christian kingdoms of the north. Parias dominated relations between the Islamic and the Christian states in the years following the disintegration of the Caliphate of Córdoba (1031) until the reunification of Islamic Spain under the Almoravid dynasty (beginning in 1086). The parias were a form of protection money established by treaty. The payee owed the tributary military protection against foes both Islamic and Christian. Usually the original exaction was forced, either by a large razzia or the threat of one, or as the cost of supporting one Islamic party against another. (The word "taifa" means "party [kingdom]" and refers to the prevalence of factionalism in Islamic Spain during the taifas era.)

== History ==
The earliest evidence of parias pertains to eastern Spain, to the Kingdom of Aragon and the County of Barcelona, which exacted a very early one—called the vetus paria or "old paria"—from the taifa of Zaragoza. While parias may have been paid by the local Muslim leaders just west of the Llobregat after Raymond Borrel's razzia on Córdoba in 1010, the earliest paria that can be dated was collected by Raymond Berengar I of Barcelona from Lleida and Zaragoza after his attack on those territories in 1045. In the 1060s he was still demanding parias from Lleida and Zaragoza, as well as the taifa of Tortosa. The Aragonese king Sancho Ramírez also took parias from the king of Zaragoza's underlings at Huesca and Tudela.

In western Spain the first ruler to exact such tribute was Ferdinand I of León and Castile. From at least 1060, perhaps as early as 1055, Ferdinand had been exacting parias from the taifas of Seville, Toledo, and Zaragoza, and possibly also Badajoz and Valencia. In accordance with his testament, Ferdinand's parias were divided amongst his heirs along with his kingdom in December 1065: the eldest son, Sancho II, received Castile with the vetus paria; the second son, Alfonso VI, received León with the parias of Toledo; and the third son, García II, received Galicia with the parias of Badajoz and Seville. Eventually all the tribute found its way into the hands of Alfonso VI, who also exacted parias from Granada. Valencia fell into the hands of Rodrigo Díaz de Vivar (1094), and upon recovery by the Muslims it was forced to briefly pay parias to Barcelona, payments which were later re-established by Raymond Berengar IV. These parias were still being collected in the reign of James I the Conqueror (1213–76), who put an end to them by conquering Valencia.

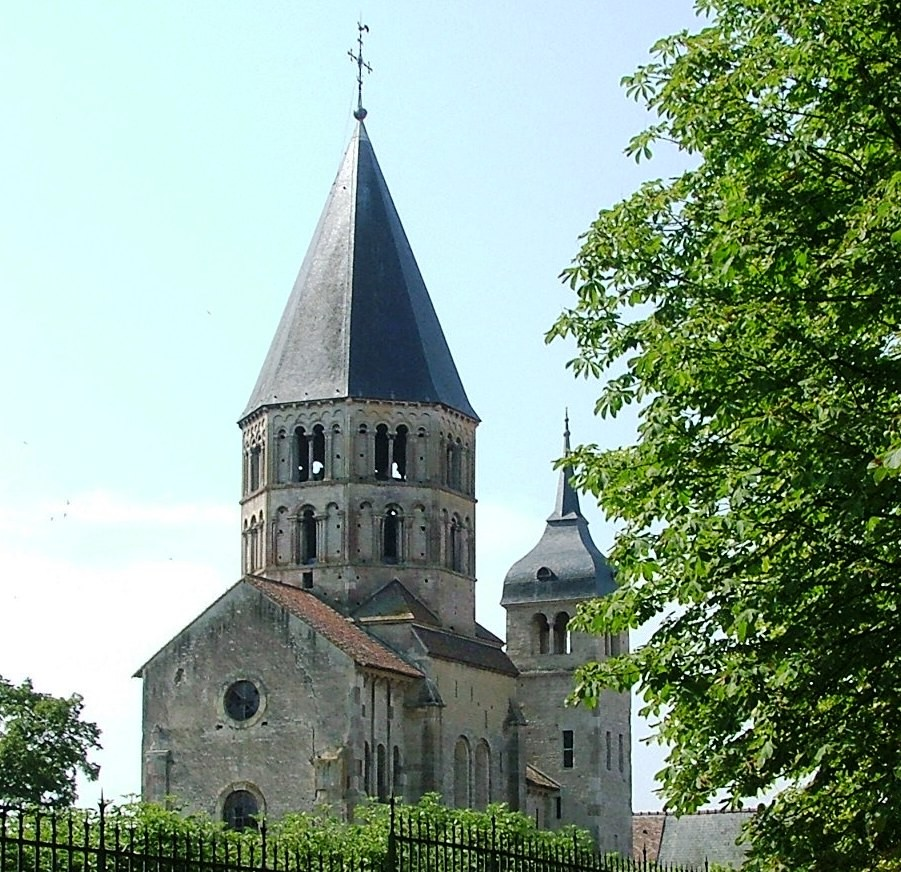
The tower of Cluny III, financed through monies originally collected as parias.

Much of the wealth acquired through parias was distributed to cathedrals and monasteries, while some found its way back to the aristocracy. Sometime between 1053 and 1065 Ferdinand of León pledged an annual census of 1,000 aurei for the Abbey of Cluny, a donation re-established by Alfonso VI in 1077 and then increased to 2,000 aurei in 1090 by this same monarch. This, known as the "Alfonsine census", was "the biggest donation that Cluny ever received from king or layman, and it was never to be surpassed". The large payments to Cluny, which financed Hugh the Great's construction of the massive third abbey church, undoubtedly helped publish the wealth of Spain throughout Europe. Unfortunately for Cluny, changing conditions in Spain caused the payments to cease in 1111, and this brought on a financial crisis during the abbacies of Pons of Melgueil (1109–22) and Peter the Venerable (1122–56). By 1100 the parias had decreased to a mere "trickle". Only in 1246, when the Kingdom of Granada, the last remaining Islamic state in Spain, agreed to pay half its annual revenue in parias to Castile, did tribute again constitute a major portion of Christian Spain's wealth. Though the burden of these last parias was sometimes reduced to a quarter or a fifth of state revenue, the Grenadine kings were forced to tax their subjects far beyond what was permissible under Islamic law.

== Amounts ==
Parias were generally paid in gold coin (aurei, "golden ones", or numos de auro, "coins of gold", in Latin), usually Islamic dinars or mithqals, accompanied by gifts of carpets, silks, ivories, plate, and other luxuries not produced widely in Christian Europe. They were extremely large sums for the times, though it is impossible to determine their precise value in modern terms. The vetus paria in about 1060, when it was being paid to Ferdinand of León, was worth around 10,000 aurei per annum. This was raised to 12,000 numos de auro per annum when Sancho IV of Navarre acquired it. In 1075 Alfonso VI negotiated 30,000 mithqals from Granada, including two years' worth of arrears, putting the annual parias at around 10,000 mithqals, comparable to the vetus paria. The largest parias on record were those forced on the eastern taifas by Alfonso's vassal Rodrigo Díaz de Vivar in 1089–91, during which period he took in 146,000 dinars. By comparison, a typical nobleman's ransom cost 500–1,000 aurei in contemporary Spain and in Córdoba 400 horses or seventy human slaves were worth about 10,000 mithqals in the 1060s. "From being among the poorest rulers in Europe," historian Richard Fletcher notes, "[the Christian kings of Spain] quickly became among the richest," and "the kingdom of León-Castile, in particular, acquired a reputation for inexhaustible wealth during the second half of the eleventh century," due in large part to the receipt of parias.

== Works cited ==
- Charles J. Bishko. 1980. Studies in Medieval Spanish Frontier History. London: Variorum Reprints.
- Brian A. Catlos. 2004. The Victors and the Vanquished. Cambridge: Cambridge University Press.
- Thomas N. Bisson. 1986. The Medieval Crown of Aragon: A Short History. Oxford: Clarendon Press.
- Richard A. Fletcher. 1978. The Episcopate in the Kingdom of León in the Twelfth Century. Oxford: Oxford University Press.
- Jocelyn N. Hillgarth. 1976. The Spanish Kingdoms, 1250–1516, volume 1. Oxford: Clarendon Press.
- Adam J. Kosto. 2001. Making Agreements in Medieval Catalonia. Cambridge: Cambridge University Press.
- Bernard F. Reilly. 1982. The Kingdom of León-Castilla under Queen Urraca, 1109–1126. Princeton: Princeton University Press.
