= Estada =

Coordinates: 42°04′16.12″N 0°13′55.52″E

- municipality
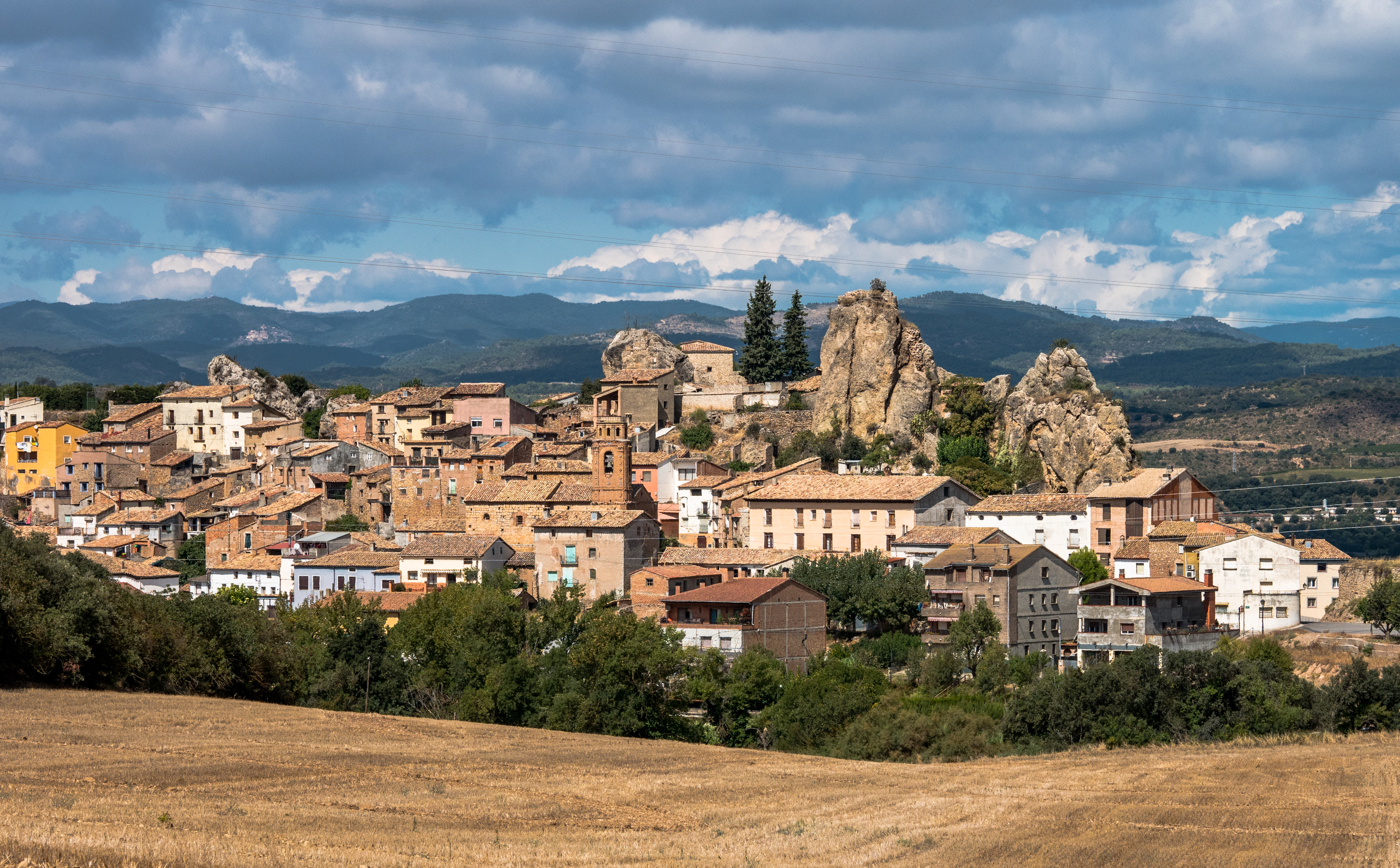
- View of Estada
- Interactive map of Estada
- Country: Spain
- Autonomous community: Aragon
- Province: Huesca

Area
  - Total: 16 km^{2} (6.2 sq mi)

Population (2025-01-01)
  - Total: 215
  - Density: 13/km^{2} (35/sq mi)
- Time zone: UTC+1 (CET)
  - Summer (DST): UTC+2 (CEST)

Estada is a municipality located in the province of Huesca, Aragon, Spain. According to the 2018 census (INE), the municipality has a population of 204 inhabitants.

== See also ==
- List of municipalities in Huesca
