= Taifa of Dénia =

Islamic kingdom in medieval Spain

Coordinates: 38.7500°N 0.1667°W

- 1010–1227
- Taifa Kingdom of Dénia, c. 1037.
- Capital: Dénia
- Common languages: Arabic; Mozarabic; Hebrew
- Religion: Islam, Christianity (Roman Catholicism), Judaism
- Government: Monarchy
- Historical era: Middle Ages
  - Downfall of Caliphate of Córdoba: 1010
  - To Zaragoza/Tortosa/Almoravids: 1076–1081 / 1081–1092 / 1092–1224
  - Remnants conquered by Aragon: 1227
- Currency: Dirham and Dinar
Preceded by
Caliphate of Córdoba
Succeeded by
Kingdom of Aragon
Taifa of Zaragoza
Taifa of Tortosa
Taifa of Majorca
Almoravid dynasty
- Today part of: Spain

The taifa of Dénia (Arabic: طائفة دانية) was an Islamic kingdom in medieval Spain, ruling over part of the Valencian coast and Ibiza. With Dénia as its capital, the taifa included the Balearic Islands and parts of the Spanish mainland. It was founded in 1010 by the Slavic Muslim warlord Mujāhid al-ʿĀmirī.

== History ==
The taifa was created in 1010, after the disintegration of the Caliphate of Córdoba, by the freed slave Mujāhid al-ʿĀmirī, a former high functionary of the caliphate, who probably had a Slavic origin. In 1011 Dénia was the first taifa to strike coins. The kingdom had a relatively powerful navy, which in 1015 was used to take control of the Balearic Islands and thence to invade Sardinia. The taifa settled a military camp in the north of the island for one year, as a base for the next attack against the Maritime Republic of Pisa, but it was reconquered by the fleets of Pisa and Genoa: in the fray Mujahid's heir, Ali Iqbal al-Dawla, was captured, and could be ransomed only in 1032. In that period the taifa's ships launched several other raids against the Ligurian and Tuscan coasts. The taifa's army employed many mercenaries from the Arab Banu Khazraj tribe. The taifa is best known for its active promotion of piracy against Christian coasts, as well as its failed conquest of Sardinia. The taifa of Dénia also had an influential Sephardic Jewish community which contributed greatly in the development of the taifa and was essential to its growth. The Jewish community held top positions in the government of the taifa.

In the 1020s Mujāhid took advantage of the death of the regents of the taifa of Valencia to capture the southern part of that kingdom, which he held for two years. A few years later he supported the rebellion of Ibn Jattab against Ibn Tahir of Murcia. After the rise of Abd al-Aziz al-Mansur in Valencia, Mujahid constantly struggled against him, conquering Murcia, Lorca, Orihuela and Elche, extending his power up to the Segura River. Through the mediation of Sulaymán ibn Hud of Zaragoza, he signed a treaty of peace with Valencia in 1041.

Mujahid, who had been educated as a slave in the court of the Andalusian ruler Al-Mansur Ibn Abi Aamir, was a patron of several intellectuals, especially writers and ulemas escaping the chaos ensuing the Córdoban dissolution. He protected Denia's Christian community in exchange for their declaration of loyalty, and worked with the Jewish mercantile community.

At the death of Mujahid al-Muwaffaq in 1045, he was succeeded by Ali Iqbal al-Dawla, a son by a Christian mother. He was able to maintain his father's conquests for some thirty years, starting a period of peace and prosperity, underpinned by a large commercial fleet based in Dénia. In 1050 the Balearic governor, Abd Allah ibn Aglab, gained autonomy for the islands. Dénia's power remained confined to its peninsular possessions until the conquest by the taifa of Zaragoza in 1076. The Balearic taifa of Mallorca remained independent until 1116.

== List of Emirs ==
=== Amirid dynasty ===
- Mujahid al-Muwaffaq (in Valencia 1017–1021): 1010/12–1045
- 'Ali Iqbal ad-Dawla: 1045–1076
  - To Zaragoza: 1060–1081 or 2/3
  - To Tortosa: 1081 or 2/3–1092
  - To Morocco: 1092–1224
- Abu Zayd 'Abd ar-Rahman (in Alzira, Xàtiva also): 1224–1227
  - To Aragon thereafter.

== See also ==
- List of Sunni Muslim dynasties
