= Historia Roderici =

Anonymous Latin prose history of Rodrigo Díaz de Vivar

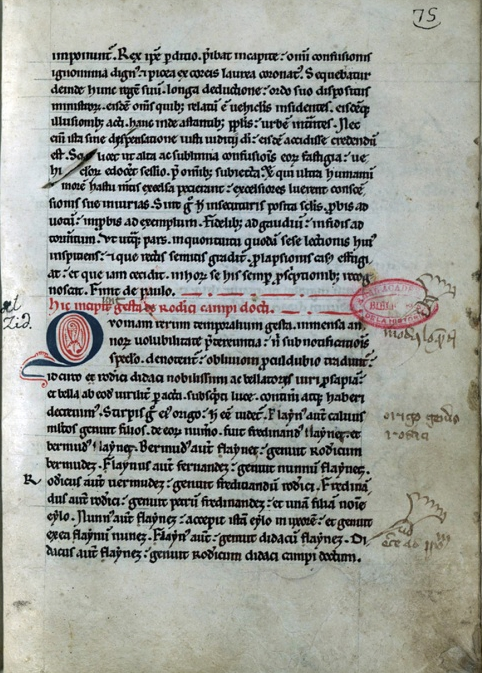
Historia Roderici, ms. 9/4922, Real Academia de la Historia, f. 75r.º

The Historia Roderici ("History of Rodrigo"), originally Gesta Roderici Campi Docti ("Deeds of Rodrigo el Campeador") and sometimes in Spanish Crónica latina del Cid ("Latin Chronicle of the Cid"), is an anonymous Latin prose history of the Castilian warrior Rodrigo Díaz, better known as El Cid Campeador.

It is generally written in a simple, unadorned Latin by an author who reveals no knowledge of a wide reading; his only reference to other literature is a Biblical reminiscence in chapter 28.

Modern editors have divided the work into seventy-seven chapters (not in the original). The author apparently knew little of Rodrigo's life before his marriage to Jimena, and the whole of it is narrated in the first six chapters. The details of Rodrigo's career leading up to and including his exile in Zaragoza (1081–86) are related with more confidence (chapters 7–24). The period of Rodrigo's return to the court of Alfonso VI of León and to Castile (1086–88) are passed over quickly (chapters 25–27), as are the years 1095–96, during which Rodrigo ruled Valencia. The largest portion of the history (chapters 28–64) is devoted to his second exile and conquest of Valencia (1089–95). The final section (chapters 65–75) covers the last two years of Rodrigo's life and a brief epilogue (chapters 76–77) describes the Christian evacuation of Valencia in 1102 under the direction of Jimena. The coverage is by no means even, as the author admits in chapter 27: "Not all the wars and warlike exploits which Rodrigo accomplished with his knights and companions are written in this book."

The earliest preserved manuscript of the work dates to the first half of the thirteenth century. It was found in the late eighteenth century in San Isidoro in León, but was probably originally copied in Castile or La Rioja. It is now MS 9/4922 in the library of the Real Academia de la Historia in Madrid. This manuscript contains many examples of early Spanish historiography: Isidore of Seville's Historia Gothorum, Julian of Toledo's Historia Wambae, the Chronicle of Alfonso III, the Chronica Naierensis, and royal genealogies. Several errors in the Historia Roderici indicate that this manuscript is a copy. Possibly it is the copy mentioned in a document of 1239 as being copied at the priory of San Zoilo in Carrión de los Condes in 1232/3 from an exemplar of the monastery of Nájera, but this cannot be proved.

R. A. Fletcher tentatively dates the Historia to before 1125. In chapter 23, the scribe of the Madrid manuscript put "Súnchez" for the correct patronymic "Sánchez", an orthographic error that may originate in a misreading of Visigothic script. The script, once common all over Spain, was disappearing in central Spain by 1125 and was all but extinct there by the 1140s, replaced by the script called francesa and adopted from France. Since the Visigothic 'a' had an open top, it resembled the French 'u'. The copyist was probably working from a Visigothic original (or faithful copy).

== Bibliography ==
- Barton, Simon. 1997. The Aristocracy in Twelfth-Century León and Castile. Cambridge: Cambridge University Press.
- Fletcher, Richard A. 1989. The Quest for El Cid. New York: Alfred A. Knopf. ISBN 0-394-57447-8.
- Reilly, Bernard F. 1988. The Kingdom of León-Castilla under King Alfonso VI, 1065–1109. Princeton: Princeton University Press.
