= Graus =

- Municipality
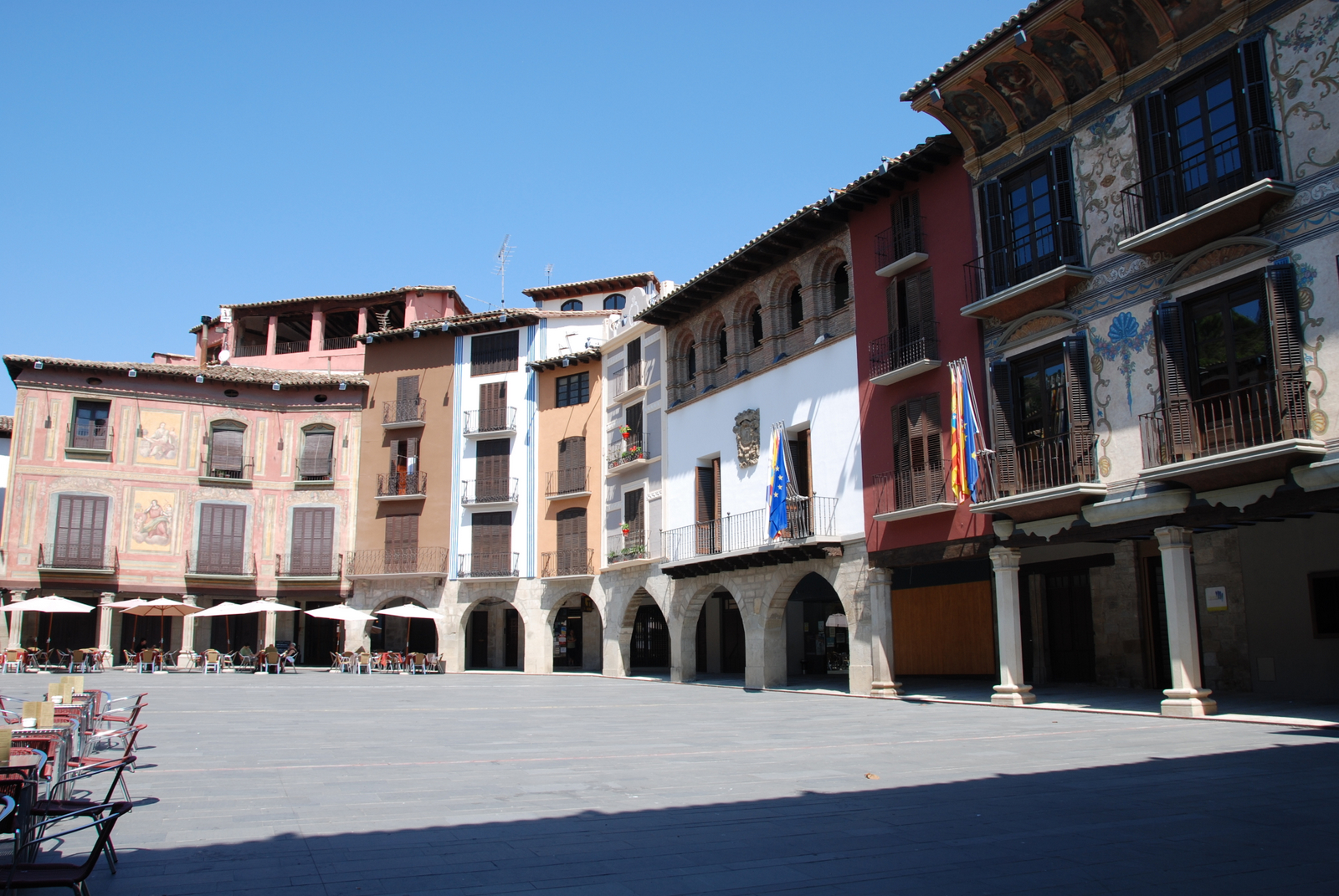
- Main Square, Graus

- Flag Coat of arms

- Location in Spain
- Coordinates: 42°11′15″N 0°20′3″E
- Country: Spain
- Autonomous Community: Aragon
- Province: Huesca
- Comarca: Ribagorza
- Judicial district: Barbastro

Government
  - Mayor: José Antonio Lagüens (PP)

Area
  - Total: 299.79 km^{2} (115.75 sq mi)
- Elevation: 542 m (1,778 ft)

Population (2025-01-01)
  - Total: 3,400
  - Density: 11/km^{2} (29/sq mi)
- Demonym: Grausino
- Time zone: UTC+1 (CET)
  - Summer (DST): UTC+2 (CEST)
- Postal code: 22430
- Patron Saints: Vincent Ferrer
- Website: Official website

Graus (Spanish: [ˈɡɾaws]) is a village in the Spanish province of Huesca, located in the Pyrenees at the confluence of rivers Esera and Isabena. It is the administrative capital of the region. It is one of the areas of Aragon in which is still preserved the Aragonese language.

The Battle of Graus took place here, and Spanish philosopher Baltasar Gracián y Morales was exiled here. During the Spanish Civil War, the village of Graus served as a fairly important local commercial center with 2,600 inhabitants around 1936. It was a libertarian stronghold and a centre of collectivization at that time.

== Geography ==
The municipality of Graus today includes the towns of: Abenozas, Aguilar, Aguinalíu, Bellestar, Benavente de Aragón, Castarlenas, Centenera, Eixep, Güel, Chuseu, Panillo, La Puebla de Fantova, La Puebla del Mon, Pueyo de Marguillén, El Soler, Torre de Ésera, Torre de Obato, Torrelabad, Torres del Obispo and Las Ventas de Santa Lucía.

There are also uninhabited villages: Bafaluy, Cancer, Erdao, Fantova, Grustán, Pano and Torruella de Aragón.

== History ==
The first population in Graus is dated from the Paleolithic as is evidenced by the remains found at the site of "Las Forcas" close to the Morral Rock.

Being one of the northernmost points of the Islam in Spain, Graus was reconquered by the Christians in 1083 by Sancho Ramirez, after the death of Ramiro I in 1063 in the Battle of Graus. After this battle, Graus was ceded to the monastery of St. Victorian of Asan, being responsible for rebuilding and repopulating the town, giving important privileges to those who populate Graus.

In 1223, Peter II of Aragon granted the town with the title of "Very Noble and Very Old Village of Graus", which retains today.

In 1415 the Dominican friar (lately canonized) St. Vincent Ferrer visited the village being invited by Berenguer de Bardaxi. Both were commissioners three years earlier in Caspe, resolving the problem of succession of the Crown of Aragon. The Valencian saint was preaching here with great success, giving in appreciation of all done by the town a crucifix which is preserved and venerated in the local church. The main festivities of the town are dedicated to Vincent Ferrer and the Holy Christ, celebrating that visit and his appreciated donation.

Centuries later, in 1588, Philip II of Spain set a weekly market every Monday that has lasted until now. Lately, in 1681 Charles II of Spain added the Santa Lucia fair every May.

In the 16th and 17th centuries, the town enjoyed an economic splendor which aided in the construction of the great mansions. Most of them still compose the Main Square of the town and other places of the village. During this period, the monument Basilica of Our Lady of the Rock was constructed.

In the 1920s, Graus incorporates the towns of Barasona and Benavente de Aragón. In the 1960s, Graus incorporates the towns of Aguinalíu, Panillo, Puebla de Fantova and Torruella de Aragon. And finally, in the 1970s, the village absorbs the towns of Chuseu, Güell and Torres de Chuseu.

During the Spanish Civil War, the town participated in the Spanish revolution and was collectivised by the CNT and UGT.

== Culture ==
- Baile de las Espadas (Swords Dance). This dance has a structure consisting of three different musical fragments, known as "Cardelina", "Taninaná" and "Culebreta" (Small Snake). It is danced by five groups with a total of twenty dancers and two "repatanes". Dressed in different outfits, the most striking is that used by the middle frame, whose dancers wears pompous lace, stockings, gloves, necklaces and flowered hats. The explanation for this costume can be found in trying to incorporate the feminine element in a male dance that, originally, was in honour of strength, virility and fertility.
- Baile de las Cintas. It is more modern than the previous one, because his music is a traditional grausina polka introduced in the second half of the 19th century and is played with orchestra. This polka was played on bagpipes before, and was known as "the old polka". The dancers dance holding a ribbons around a large pole decorated with ribbons and flowers, representing an ancestral fertility celebration. Previously, it was only danced by men until the 1960s, when mixed pairs were introduced and it was expanded from four to eight pairs, all dressed in the typical costume of Graus.
- La Mojiganga. It is a satirical and burlesque show performed every September 13, that performs a detailed review of what happened in the town during the year. His transgressor character caused many interruptions of this popular show: from 1809 to 1813 due to the French invasion, from 1834 to 1838 due to poor harvests and famine, and the longest, since the government of Primo de Rivera and until its restoration in 1979. In the parade that precedes the Mojiganga, it still retains some of its medieval origins, as the "estafermo" and the "tarasca", medieval mobile dolls that clear the passage of the Mojiganga court.
- La Llega. It is used to collect donations for the activities of the Confraternity of the Holy Christ, and runs through the village, dancing to the sound of bagpipes and blunderbusses with large wood sticks. During the "Llega" it is shared "el cordoné", a small hallowed ribbon that most of the population wears tied round the wrist.
- Las Albadas. They are songs that are sung through the streets of the town by night, dating from Moorish times, and tell stories of love and glorification of popular characters of the village.
- El Llibré. In order to have all the information of the popular festivals in Graus, each year is published "el llibré" (little book in Graus Aragonese), which reflects the program of the festivals, poems, stories and texts, most of them written in Graus Aragonese.

== Celebrations ==
- Town Festival, September 12 to 15, in honor of Holly Christ and Saint Vicent Ferrer. This festival is declared "National Touristic Interest" mainly for they rich and varied traditions: one of the best preserved bagpipe tune and dance ("Baile de las Espadas", "Swords Dance") in Aragon, along with the traditional giants and "cabezudos" (big heads), blunderbusses, "Albada songs" and one of the best preserved mojiganga in Spain called "La Mojiganga".
- "La Fiesta de la longaniza" (Festival of the Longaniza, a typical local dish). Each year, the last weekend of July is prepared the world's largest barbecue with 1100 kg of longaniza since 1997.

== Gastronomy ==
The most known dish in Graus is the longaniza, one of the delicacies of this region and awarded with the brand "Q for Quality" in Aragon. Its importance is emphasized each year with the celebration of the "Longaniza Day", the last weekend of July.

The "chireta" is a typical dish of this region of Aragon, which is made up of lamb guts stuffed with rice and meat. Finally the guts are sewn and then boiled.

Graus is also known for be one of the largest black truffle markets nationwide.

== Notable people ==
- Joaquín Costa (1846–1911): politician, jurist and economist. Although Joaquín Costa was born in Monzón, he lived most of his life in Graus. He was known publicly as "The Lion of Graus".
- Eusebio Bardají Azara (1776–1842): lawyer, diplomat and politician.
- Diego Cera (1762–1832): Notable organbuilder that built the organ in San Nicolas Church (Intramuros, now destroyed) and the world-famous Bamboo Organ of Las Piñas.
- Francisco Javier Asarta Ferraz (1936- ): Architect. In 1997 he was awarded, together with Robert Brufau and Raquel Lacuesta, with the National Prize for Cultural Heritage granted by the Generalitat de Catalunya for the restoration of the Casa Milà.

== Twin Towns ==
- (France) Tournefeuille, Haute-Garonne

== See also ==
- List of municipalities in Huesca
