= Taifa of Tortosa =

Medieval Islamic taifa kingdom

Coordinates: 40°48′46″N 0°31′09″E

- 1010–1099
- Taifa Kingdom of Tortosa, c. 1037.
- Capital: Tortosa
- Common languages: Arabic, Mozarabic, Hebrew, Berber
- Religion: Islam, Christianity (Roman Catholic), Judaism
- Government: Monarchy
- Historical era: Middle Ages
  - Downfall of Caliphate of Córdoba: 1010
  - To Zaragoza: 1060–1081
  - Conquered by Granada: 1099
- Currency: Dirham and Dinar
Preceded by	Succeeded by
Caliphate of Cordoba	Almoravid dynasty

The Taifa of Tortosa (Arabic: طائفة طرطوشة) was a medieval Islamic taifa kingdom. It existed for two separate periods, from 1010 to 1060 and 1081 to 1099. It was founded by the Slavic warlord Labib al-Fata al-Saqlabi.

== List of Emirs ==
=== Saqlabi (Servile Rulers) dynasty ===
- Labib al-Fata al-Saqlabi (Valencia 1017–1019): c. 1009–bfr. 1039/40
- Muqatil Sayf al-Milla: bfr. 1039/40–1053/4
- Ya'la: 1053/4–1057/8
- Nabil: 1057/8–1060
  - To Zaragoza: 1060–1081 or 2/3

=== Huddid dynasty ===
- Imad al-Dawla Mundhir: 1081 or 1082/3–1090
- Sulayman Sayyid: 1090–c.1115
  - To Morocco: c.1115–1148

== See also ==
- List of Sunni Muslim dynasties
