= Richard A. Fletcher =

British medieval historian (1944–2005)

Richard Alexander Fletcher (28 March 1944, in York, England – 28 February 2005, in Nunnington, England) was a British historian who specialised in the medieval period.

== Early years ==
Richard Fletcher was the eldest child and only son of Alexander Kendal Humphrey Fletcher, a banker from Leeds, by his marriage to Monica Elizabeth Hastings Medhurst/Fletcher. His childhood home was at Wighill, near Tadcaster. He attended, as a scholar, Harrow School and Worcester College, Oxford where he was taught by James Campbell and achieved a First Class Honours degree.

== Professional career ==
In 1969, he was appointed as a lecturer at the University of York where he remained for the rest of his career, becoming professor of history in 1998. His first book, published in 1978 and based on his doctoral thesis, was entitled "The Episcopate in the Kingdom of León in the Twelfth Century", which pointed the way for an academic career much of which would focus on medieval Spain. Fletcher was one of the outstanding talents in English and Spanish medieval scholarship.

== Personal ==
Richard Fletcher married Rachel Mary Agnes Toynbee, herself a granddaughter both of another notable historian, Arnold J. Toynbee, and of a British Liberal prime minister, H. H. Asquith, in 1976. The marriage produced three children.

== Select bibliography of Fletcher's publications ==
- The Quest for El Cid. 1989, 1991.
- Who's Who in Roman Britain and Anglo-Saxon England, 1989 (first volume of Who's Who in British History)
- Moorish Spain. 1992.
- The Conversion of Europe: From Paganism to Christianity 371-1386AD London 1997 ISBN 0002552035, as The Barbarian Conversion: From Paganism to Christianity Los Angeles: University of California Press, 1999.
- Bloodfeud: Murder and Revenge in Anglo-Saxon England. Penguin. 2002. ISBN 0-14-028692-6.
- Christian-Muslim Understanding in the Later Middle Ages. 2003.
- The Cross and The Crescent: The Dramatic Story of the Earliest Encounters Between Christians and Muslims. 2005.
