= Bardenas Reales =

Badlands in southeast Navarre, Spain

Coordinates: 42°11′27″N 1°28′12″W

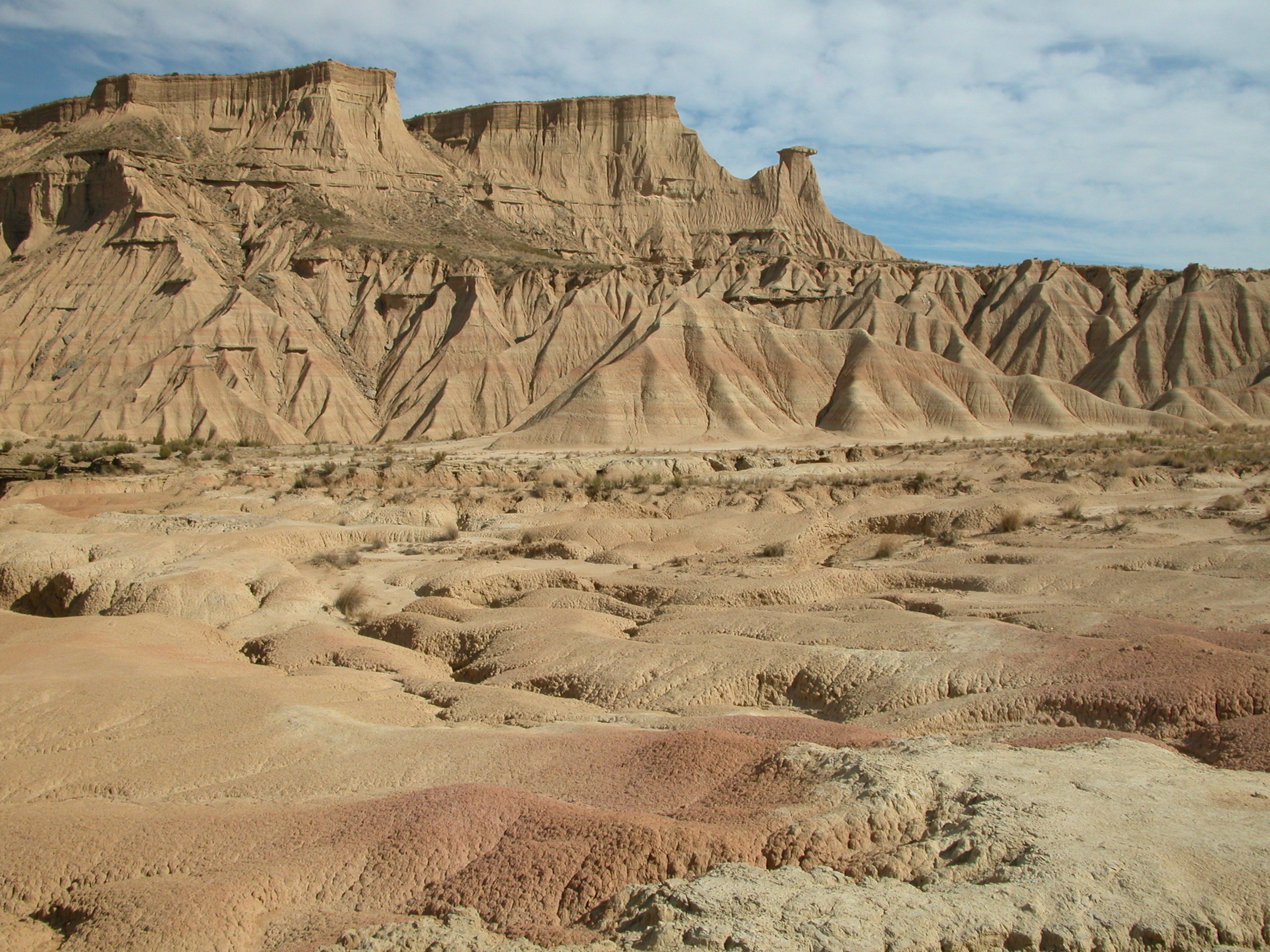
- A view of the desert.
- Area: 420 km^{2} (160 mi^{2})

Naming
- Native name: Bardenas Reales (Spanish)

Geography
- Country: Spain
- Autonomous Community: Navarre
- Interactive map of Bardenas Reales

The Bardenas Reales (in Basque: Errege Bardea) is a semi-desert natural region, or badlands, of some 42,000 hectares (420 km^{2}; 104,000 acres) in southeast Navarre (Spain). The soils are made up of clay, chalk, and sandstone and have been eroded by water and wind creating surprising shapes, canyons, plateaus, tabular structures, and isolated hills, called cabezos. Bardenas Reales lacks urban areas, vegetation is scarce and the many streams that cross the territory have a markedly seasonal flow, staying dry most of the year.

The area has been a natural park since 1999 and a UNESCO biosphere reserve since 2000. Since 1951 part of it has been used as an air weapons range by the Spanish Air Force.

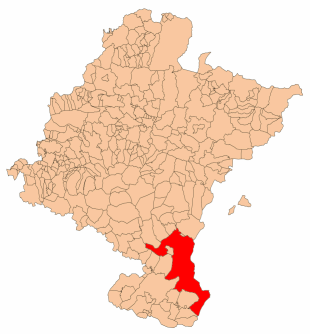
Bardenas of Navarra.

== Location ==
The Bardenas is in the southeast of Navarre, bordering Aragon. It is located in the middle of the depression of the Ebro valley at the foot of the mountains of the Yugo and the Zaragoza region of Cinco Villas. It is about 45 km (28 mi) from north to south and 24 km (15 mi) east-west, at an altitude ranging between 280 and 659 m (919 and 2,162 ft). Its area is 41,845 hectares (418.45 km^{2}; 103,400 acres). It borders thirteen Navarrese municipalities: Carcastillo, Santacara, Mélida and Caparroso to the north; Villafranca, Cadreita, Valtierra and Arguedas to the west; Tudela, Cabanillas, Fustiñana and Buñuel to the south; and Rada. On the Aragonese side it borders Tauste, Ejea de los Caballeros and Sádaba.

Las Bardenas is divided into several distinct areas which mainly include two, Black Bardena and White Bardena, but there are other smaller areas of great singularity.

=== White Bardena ===
It is the central and most desert-like area. Its relief is characterized by extensive plains and deep gorges through which rivers flow. The White Bardena has the whitest landscapes, from the gypsum in the soil, with steppe vegetation. The town of Arguedas is the usual entry point, and the park's visitor centre is about 6 km (3.7 mi) from it.

The White Bardena divides into two, the White Lower and Upper White. The first is the most depressed and the second extends from Pisquerra and Eguaras to Carcastillo.

=== Black Bardena ===
Black Bardena is situated in the southeastern part of the territory on the border of the Autonomous Community of Aragon. It has pine forests and clay soils. Aleppo pine woods grow in its warmer areas.

=== Central Plateau ===
There is a central plateau that lies 100 m (330 ft) above the surrounding area and is farmed. It is formed by Tertiary and Quaternary soils that were raised by pressure associated with the creation of the Pyrenees and the mountains of Central Spain that caused the collapse of the Ebro basin forming an inland sea enclosed by the Catalan Coastal Range. Sediments laid down were then eroded from the Eocene onwards. These formed gravel and sandstone that stayed at the top; fine sand, clay, and limestone occupy the lower slopes. Clay remained in the centre and limestone and gypsum formed at the edges. Ten million years ago, the basin opened to the Mediterranean Sea and drained, leaving the Ebro, which began water erosion along the southern perimeter.

== Wildlife ==
UNESCO describes the area as "a true cold desert in the heart of Europe". Its birds of prey include the griffon vulture, Egyptian vulture, golden eagle and peregrine falcon, and its steppe birds include the great bustard, little bustard and the rare Dupont's lark. Salt-tolerant plants grow in the depressions.

== Protected status ==
The Bardenas Reales were declared a natural park in 1999, taking in earlier nature reserves, and UNESCO added them to its world network of biosphere reserves in November 2000. UNESCO lists the reserve at 39,273 hectares (392.73 km^{2}; 97,050 acres).

== History and management ==
The land is owned and managed by the Comunidad de Bardenas Reales de Navarra, based in Tudela. According to the Comunidad, the first known grant of rights dates from January 882, when King Sancho García of Navarre allowed the Roncal Valley to graze livestock, build pens and set up huts there as a reward for help against the Muslims. The land was held as royal property by right of conquest, which gave rise to the name Reales ("royal"). Further grants to towns and valleys followed over the next six centuries. A royal decree of Philip V dated 14 April 1705 granted perpetual and exclusive use to 22 entities in exchange for 12,000 reales de a ocho, which the Comunidad regards as its founding title; its first ordinances were approved in 1820.

The Comunidad's highest body is a General Assembly of 22 members, one for each entity with rights, including the Monastery of La Oliva; it elects a standing commission of seven members and a president. The members include the valleys of Roncal and Salazar.

== Military firing range ==
In 1951, under the Franco dictatorship, an air firing range was set up in the Bardenas. It is the only air firing range in Spain and the largest in Europe by area. It is run by the Spanish Air Force; it has been used to prepare for conflicts from the Balkans to Syria, and NATO holds its Sirio exercises there. About 2,000 ha (4,900 acres) are in military use. UNESCO lists the range as lying outside the biosphere reserve.

The Mancomunidad de Bardenas Reales, a grouping of town councils, leases the land to the Ministry of Defence for a little over seven million euros a year. The range has long been opposed by local groups, including the Asamblea Antipolígono, whose 31st consecutive annual protest march was called off in 2020 because of the COVID-19 pandemic, and by Ecologists in Action. As of 2020, at least 37 accidents had been linked to air exercises there.

== Filming ==
Filming in the park requires a permit and fees from the Comunidad, with limits on locations and drone flights. Scenes for the sixth season of Game of Thrones were scheduled to be filmed in the Bardenas in September 2015, with about 300 crew, and the area was reported as the setting for the Dothraki Sea.
