= Merindad =

Mediaeval Spanish administrative entity

Merindad (Spanish pronunciation: [meɾinˈdað]) is a mediaeval Spanish administrative term for a country subdivision smaller than a province but larger than a municipality. The officer in charge of a merindad was called a merino, roughly equivalent to the English count or bailiff.

It was used in the kingdoms of Castile and Navarre. Connected to the birth of Castile, the Merindades, standing for the northernmost comarca of the province of Burgos, was part of the creation of the administrative division by King Peter.

== Navarre ==
Currently, the Foral Community of Navarre is still divided into five merindades standing for different judicial districts. The historic Merindad de Ultrapuertos lying to the north of the Pyrenees is nowadays Lower Navarre.

Administratively, they have been substituted by the partido judicial. In Biscay, the mancomunidades comarcales keep the place of the old merindades, such as Duranguesado.

=== Merindad of Estella ===
The merindad of Estella or Tierra Estella (in Basque: Lizarrako Merindadea or Lizarrerria) is one of the five merindades into which the Foral Community of Navarre (Spain) has historically been divided and whose head of merindad is the town of Estella. Its territorial delimitation coincides with that of the judicial district of the same name. The merindad encompasses 72 municipalities and 39 facerías among which are the Sierra de Urbasa, the Sierra de Andía and the Sierra de Lóquiz as the largest. The total area of the merindad of Estella is 2,068.6 km².

The merindad of Estella is located in western Navarre, covering parts of Navarre in the north and the Ribera de Navarra in the south. It borders the merindad of Pamplona to the north, the Merindades of Pamplona and Olite to the east, La Rioja to the south, and Álava, in the Basque Country, to the west.

=== Merindad of Olite ===
Established by Charles III of Navarre on April 18, 1407, the merindad of Olite was formed by separating towns from the Merindades of Sangüesa and Estella, later becoming the judicial district of Tafalla.

=== Merindad of Ribera ===
The 1366 census already classified towns like Valdorba, San Martín de Unx, Ujué, Murillo el Fruto, Santacara, Murillo el Cuende, Pitillas, and Beire as part of the merindad of Ribera (Aragón and Cidacos River regions). The merindad of La Ribera originally included Artajona, Tafalla, Caparroso, and Rada, alongside towns later assigned to the merindad of Tudela. This structure remained until 1342, when records began distinguishing Tudela separately, though reassignment was not immediate.

=== Evolution of the merindad of Tudela ===
The merindad of Tudela has fewer Basque influences than any other in Navarre, with distinct Romance and pre-Roman place names. Many of its towns were once under Islamic rule, with Muslim and Mudéjar populations persisting long after the Reconquista, particularly in the capital, where Arabic influences remain in toponymy and vocabulary. These cultural traces are visible south of the merindad of Estella, near the Ebro River, becoming more pronounced southeast of Azagra toward Aragon.

Navarre's merindad boundaries have shifted over time. By 1366, Tudela's simpler administration featured fewer but more densely populated towns. The 1366 census lists Tudela first, followed by Tafalla, Artajona, Caparroso, Rada, Mélida, Carcastillo, Marcilla, Villafranca, Cadreita, Valtierra, Arguedas, Murillo, Cabanillas, Fustiñana, Cortes, Buñuel, Ribaforada, Fontellas, Ablitas, Monteagudo, Cascante, Pedriz, Tulebras, Murchante, Centreniego, Corella, and Castellón. It also records governors (alcaides) in Monteagudo, Ablitas, Tafalla, Corella, Cortes, Sanchabarca, Peñaflor, Peña Redondo, and Valtierra. Additionally, the census classified social groups, listing farmers, free citizens (francos), Moors, Jews, and fijosdalgo (hidalgos, nobles), who resided in Tudela, Cascante, Monteagudo, Arguedas, Fontellas, Cadreita, Valtierra, Marcilla, Caparroso, and other towns.

== See also ==
- Partidos of Buenos Aires, a second-level administrative subdivision
- Partidos of Chile in Colonial Chile, a second-level administrative subdivision
