= Fortún Garcés Cajal =

Navarro-Aragonese nobleman

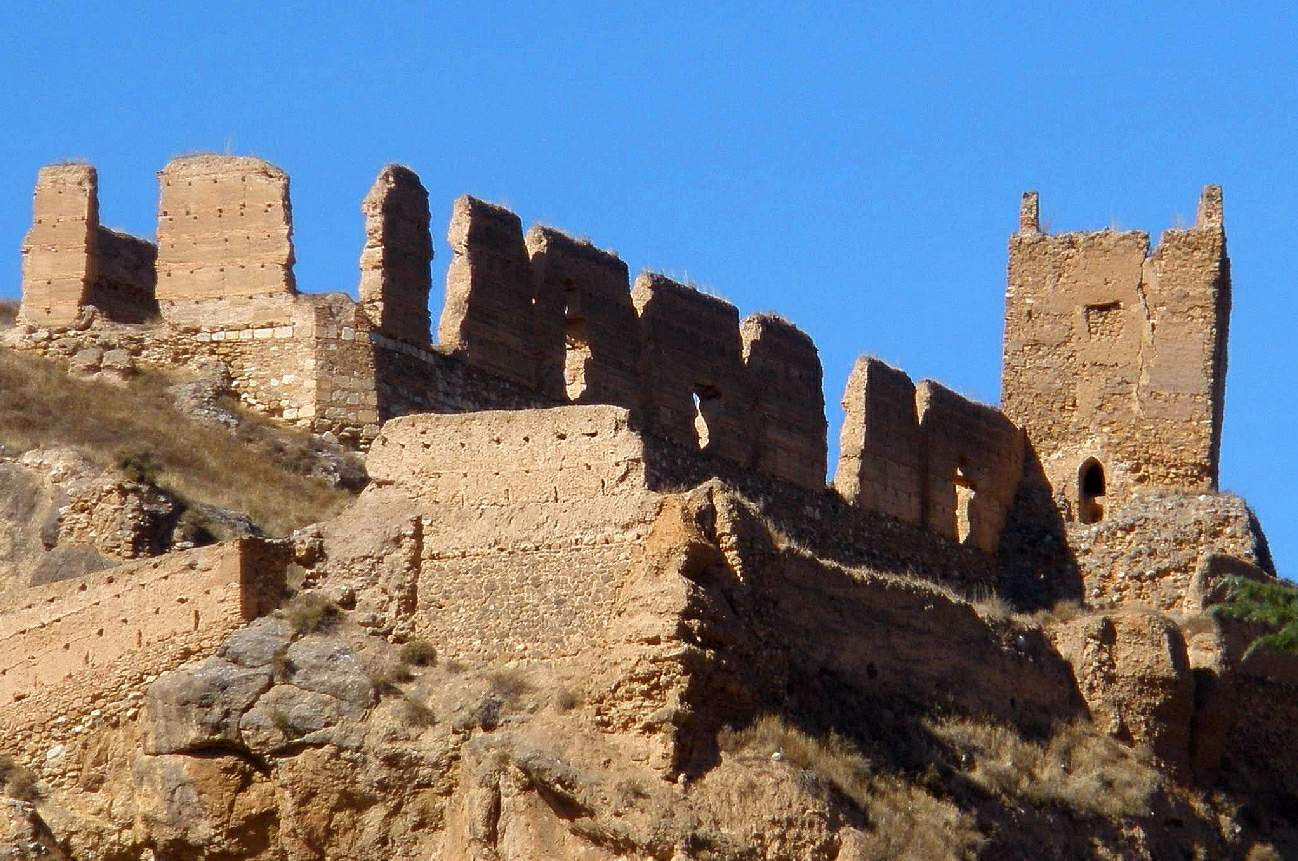
The ruins of the old castle (castillo mayor) of Daroca, which Fortún governed for a time

Fortún Garcés Cajal (Note: In contemporary documents, his first name is also spelled Fortunio, Fortuño, Fortuiño, Fertun, Fertungo, etc.; his patronymic Garçes, Garceiz, Garzes, etc.; and his nickname Caxal, Kaxal, Casal, Caixal, Kaisal, Caissal, Kaissal, Cayxal, Caisare, Cassar, etc. The meaning of the latter is uncertain. It may be related to a word for "molar tooth". Contemporary spellings varied, but in his charter of 1145, his own chaplain spelled his name Fortunio Garceiz Kaixal.) (died 1146) was a Navarro-Aragonese nobleman and statesman, perhaps "the greatest noble of Alfonso the Battler's reign". He was very wealthy in both land and money, and could raise two to three hundred knights for his retinue, funded both out of his treasury and enfeoffed on his lands.

In 1113 Fortún replaced Diego López I de Haro in the large and important tenancy of Nájera and Viguera. He held it until 1135. After the death of Alfonso the Battler in 1134, Fortún became a vassal of King Alfonso VII of Castile.

== Lordships ==
Fortún was probably born around 1075. Nothing is known of his life before he appears at the court of Alfonso the Battler in 1110. In that year he witnessed Alfonso's arbitration of a dispute between the diocese of Pamplona and the abbey of Saint-Sernin at Toulouse over possession of the church of Artajona. Thereafter, Fortún's rise was rapid. As a servant of the crown, Fortún held several lordships (tenencias), compact territorial fiefs where a nobleman governed on behalf of the crown. These were not hereditary lordships, but were granted by the king, the lords (tenentes) holding them as long as the king wished. In 1113, Fortún replaced Diego López I de Haro in the large and important lordship of Nájera and Viguera. This territory was in the Kingdom of Castile, on the border with Aragon, and Fortún was able to hold it only because of Alfonso the Battler's marriage to Queen Urraca of Castile in 1109. Although the marriage was annulled in 1112, Alfonso had a base of support in the Castilian kingdom and substantial influence in the contested border region that had once belonged to Navarre. Fortún managed to hold onto Nájera until after Alfonso's death in 1134, when he accepted the overlordship of King Alfonso VII of Castile, who had succeeded his mother in 1126. The last record of Fortún's tenancy comes from 1135, and sometime before 1139 he had been replaced by his predecessor's son, Count Lope Díaz de Haro.

Fortún campaigned extensively alongside the king in the Reconquista ("reconquest") of the Muslim states of the Ebro valley. In 1121, as a reward, Alfonso granted Fortún the lordships of Tudela (conquered in 1119) and Daroca (conquered in 1120). In 1127, the lordship of Tudela was transferred to Count Rotrou III of Perche, a visiting Frenchman who had come to aid in the Reconquista.

The accession of Alfonso VII in 1126, weakened the position of Alfonso the Battler in the frontier district of the Bureba, where he had been able up until then to install his own appointees as lords. There is evidence that at a local level the king of Castile's man was recognised and active as tenant, but that when the king of Aragon was present, his choice of tenant was enforced. In 1129, the former was the Castilian Rodrigo Gómez and the latter was Fortún Cajal, as illustrated by two charters from Briviesca. One was drawn up by the chancery of Alfonso the Battler during the king's stay in Briviesca on 10 October 1129. It names Fortún as tenant of Briviesca. From November of the same year, a private charter from the abbey of San Salvador de Oña recognises the lordship of Rodrigo Gómez over Briviesca.

In 1130–31, Fortún's household took in two criatores, children who were raised and educated in the house of a higher nobleman.

At some point, Fortún was appointed lord of Ullé, near Jaca, in the heart of old Aragon. By 1133, he had delegated responsibility for his tenancies to two relatives, García Cajal and Lope Cajal. In 1133, this had received formal approval and confirmation from the king.

== Counsellor of Ramiro II ==
After Alfonso the Battler died on 7 September 1134, Aragon and Navarre separated. The Navarrese chose as their king García Ramírez, lord of Monzón, while the Aragonese chose Alfonso's younger brother, Ramiro II. Part of the old kingdom of Navarre was including Nájera was seized by Alfonso VII of Castile. During Ramiro's short reign (1134–37), Fortún was his closest and most influential counsellor. In January 1135 he helped negotiate the Pact of Vadoluengo with Navarre, which gave Aragon suzerainty over Navarre and defined their border.

The events of 1134–35 left Fortún's lands and tenancies spread across three kingdoms. He managed to maintain his control of Nájera, where in May 1135 Alfonso VII made a large gift to him in the presence of the leading regional nobility. In mid-1136, while traversing Navarre to negotiate with Alfonso VII an anti-Navarrese alliance, he was captured by agents of King García. In order to raise the cash for his ransom, he had to sell numerous properties in both Aragon and Navarre to the wealthy monastery of San Salvador de Leire. The lands previously granted to the monastery of Nájera were exempted from sale by order of King Ramiro, but in fact the estates at Aibar and Alcatén were taken over by Leire at this time. Fortún, reduced in wealth and status, regained his freedom in 1137.

== Attempts to found a church ==
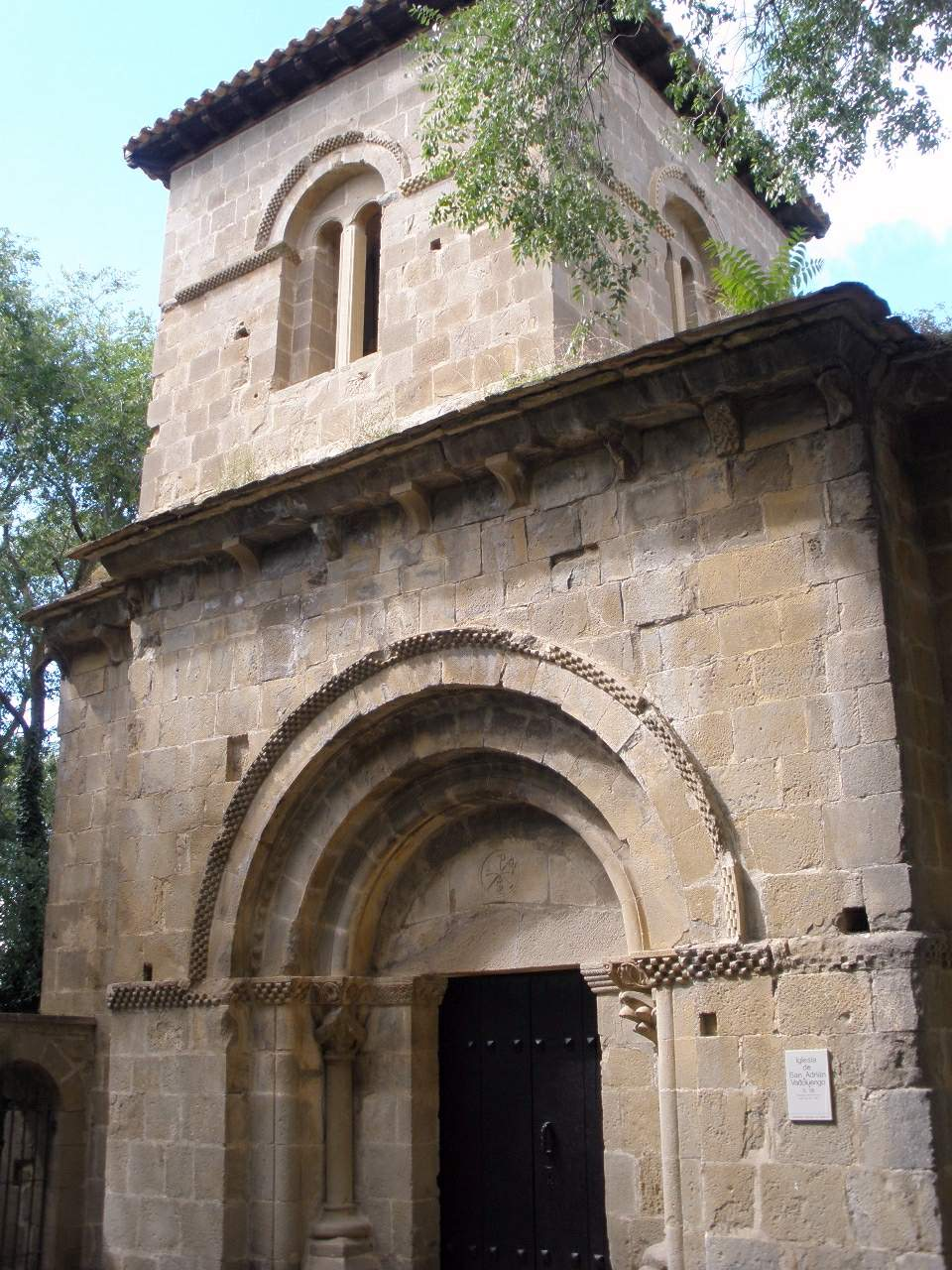
San Adrián de Vadoluengo today

In 1133, Fortún and his wife Toda (or Tota) made a donation the Cluniac monastery of Santa María de Nájera and its prior, Peter. It consisted in a proprietary church dedicated to San Adrián and a heritable estate (heredad) at Vadoluengo, another church and heredad at Sangüesa, two heredades at Aibar and, most valuable of all, a grove (soto) at Alcatén, in territory that had recently been conquered from the Muslims. Fortún and Toda maintained lifetime rights (vitalicia) over the properties, and probably intended that they should form the basis of a new Cluniac dependency after his death.

After his liberation, Fortún set about redeeming some of his properties from Leire. In the same year (1137), he and Toda made a donation to their chaplain, a Frenchman named Peter, probably a Cluniac monk. The donation—a manor house (palacio) and heritable estate in the Burgo Nuevo of Sangüesa—were supposed to be the kernel of a new monastery that would make intercession with God on behalf of Fortún, his wife and late son and the kings Peter I (1094–1104) and Alfonso. In this chater, Fortún calls the late kings his relatives (parentes). The historian Gregorio de Balparda suggested that Fortún was a son of Urraca Garcés, daughter of King García Sánchez III of Pamplona, and her husband, Count García Ordóñez of Nájera. Urraca and Peter I were first cousins once removed. Fortún's parents, however, are not directly attested in any document and his descent from García Ordóñez, although consistent with his patronymic Garcés, is unlikely.

In 1141, Fortún and Toda altered their plans to establish a Cluniac subpriory at Vadoluengo under Nájera. Enlisting the aid of Sancho de Larrosa, bishop of Pamplona, who re-consecrated San Adrián as a Cluniac priory, they donated both the church and the heredad at Vadoluengo to the mother church of Cluny, turning it into a priory directly under the mother abbey. They also donated the manor and heredad at Sangüesa, previously granted to their chaplain, to Cluny at this time. Together these lands formed the church and temporal endowment (abadengo) of a new Cluniac foundation, San Adrián de Sangüesa. (Note: Sometimes erroneously known as San Adrián de Zaragoza.) Cluniac monks moved into their new priory on the day it was consecrated. Although Fortún's original intention in 1133 had been to establish the first Cluniac house in Aragon, boundary changes in the interim had turned his foundation into the first Navarrese priory. (Note: There was already a Nájeran subpriory in Navarre: San Jorge de Azuelo at Berrueza.) It is possible that Peter the Venerable, the abbot of Cluny, visited his new daughter house of San Adrián during his trip through Spain in 1142.

By 1145, Fortún's wife had died and Sancho de Larrosa had been succeeded by Lope de Artajona as bishop of Pamplona. In that year, through the "intervention and authority" (interuentus et auctoritas) of Bishop Lope, Fortún repeated his donation of 1141 in the presence of Abbots John of San Juan de la Peña (Aragon), Peter of Leire (Navarre) and Peter of Santa María de Irache (Navarre). This second donation was designed to remove any uncertainty over the validity of that of 1141. The charter was drawn up by Fortún's own chaplain, Peter (Petrus, prefati Kaixal capellanus).

== Properties ==
Fortún and Toda owned land throughout the Ebro valley and in the Navarrese interior and their property transactions have left an extensive written record. Twenty-five different properties have been identified from surviving records. Most are houses with appurtenances. The centre of his scattered holdings appears to have been Sangüesa. Most of his lands in the Ebro valley fell within the triangle Tarazona–Tudela–Zaragoza. They did not form a single manorial estate or honour, but were of different kinds and administered separately. The couple's property was all held jointly, even property which Fortún alone had acquired, as, for example, the grants from the king. For the most part, the couple were absentee landlord collecting rents and produce.

Fortún campaigned with Alfonso extensively in the Ebro valley, and many of his lands were acquired there after conquest. Muslim-owned lands would have been taken into the king's possession and disposed of as he saw fit. Many went as gifts to the high nobility and continued to circulate among them on an open market. The land of interior Navarre and old Aragon was much more stable and less was available for purchase. This drew magnates interested in expanding their properties to the frontier. The newly conquered lands had also been well developed by their previous Muslim owners and could be immediately exploited. Much of the interior of Navarre and old Aragon would have required infusions of capital to be turned into productive land.

In 1127, Fortún received seven properties from the king in Almorata, Borja, Pedrola and Tarazona in Aragon, Fontellas in Navarre and in Zaragoza. These properties, which were allodial, were deliberately spread out so as to prevent the concentration of economic power, or the creation of de facto lordships. The nobility sometimes moved to concentrate their holdings through sales and purchases, but they oftentimes desired widespread estates so as to extend their influence into more zones. There is no evidence that Fortún held lands in the lordships of Daroca or Nájera. He did acquire lands in his lordship at Tudela.

In 1127, Fortún and his wife purchased land including a mill, gardens, fields, woods, vineyards and water rights at Tudela from two mudéjares, Zaida and her son Bolageg abin Frauchat for three hundred solidi and one mare. At the same time, he received a mill at Murillo de Limas from Abubecar abin Fraucat and Muza abin Fraucat in return for unspecified services he and his wife had rendered. In 1130 or 1131 Fortún and Toda purchased property at a place called Uli in interior Navarre.

Besides his Navarrese estates at Vadoluengo, Sangüesa and Uli and his grants from the king, Fortún land at Alagón in the valley of the Ebro; at Cabañas and Calatayud in the valley of the Jalón; and at Agreda and Cunchilla in the valley of the Queiles. There is only fleeting evidence of how Fortún and Toda managed their holdings. A document from 1141, shows they had a clavero (overseer) in charge of their estate at Uli. At Alagón and Cabañas, their lands were worked by exarics (Muslim peasant farmers).

Fortún and Toda did sometimes invest in their properties. They built a mill, probably for grinding grain, at Murillo de Limas beside the bridge over the Ebro in the Christian quarter of Tudela. It became known as the molino de Cajar. This was a commercial development. They also built a mill and tienda (store) at Tarazona. Around 1120 at Gronium, a ford of the Ebro two kilometres from Munilla, Fortún founded a bridge with a hospital and a church dedicated to Saint John. This foundation served the pilgrims along the Way of Saint James.

The "tower of Cajal" in Zaragoza along the Gállego river, mentioned in contemporary documents, presumably belonged to Fortún.

== Will and death ==
Fortún and Toda drew up a will for the first time in October 1133. This will benefited the military orders of the Templars and Hospitallers as well as the cathedral of Saint Mary of Bethlehem in the Holy Land. The Hospitallers received land at Tarazona, Tudela and Zaragoza, while the Templars received land at Tudela, Fontellas, Castellane, Mariano and Soiset, as well as a mill and grove at Alcaten.

Late in 1133, while campaigning with Alfonso the Battler against Mequinenza, García Cajal, Fortún's son, was killed in battle. Fortún's nephew, Lope Cajal, died at the Battle of Fraga in 1134, willing his lands to the Templars.

In 1141, Fortún and Toda drew up a second and final will. In it, he "divided his honour between his nephews", Fortún Íñiguez and Sancho Íñiguez, respective lords of Grañón and Belorado. Fortún Íñiguez had governed Grañón under the authority of his uncle from 1120 to 1131, while Belorado too had belonged to Cajal between 1120 and 1133, when he was represented there by Esteban Gassion.

Fortún died in 1146, as two charters of the Templars attest. (Note: The charters were drawn up in "the year in which Cajal and Rodrigo Pérez died, Era 1184" (anno quo obiit Kaxal et Rodrig Petreç, era M^{a}. C^{a}. LXXX^{a}. IIII^{a}.; anno quo obiit Kaxal et Roricho Petriç, era M^{a}. C^{a}. LXXX^{a}. III^{a}.). The latter charter is dated to 1145 in error.)

== Sources ==
- Balaguer Sánchez, Federico (1950). "La ciudad de Barbastro y las negociaciones diplomáticas de Ramiro II". Argensola: Revista de Ciencias Sociales del Instituto de Estudios Altoaragoneses. 2.
- Balparda y las Herrerías, Gregorio de (1933). Historia crítica de Vizcaya y de sus Fueros, I (1st ed.). Bilbao: Imprenta Mayli.
- Bishko, Charles Julian (1983). "A Hispano-Cluniac Benefactor in the Epoch of Navarro-Aragonese Separation: Fortún Garcés Cajal and the Founding of San Adrian of Vadoluengo (Sangüesa), 1133–1145". Estudios en homenaje a Don Claudio Sánchez-Albornoz en sus 90 años, vol. 2. Buenos Aires. pp. 275–312.
- Bishko, Charles Julian (1984). "Peter the Venerable's Traverse of Spain: Some Further Observations". Spanish and Portuguese Monastic History, 600–1300 (PDF). London: Variorum Reprints. pp. 1–13.
- Cabanes Pecourt, María de los Desamparados (1995). "Datas históricas en la documentación de Veruela del siglo XII" (PDF). Aragón en la Edad Media (12): 13–28. ISSN 0213-2486.
- Canal Sánchez-Pagín, J. M. (1997). "El conde García Ordóñez, rival del Cid Campeador: su familia, sus servicios a Alfonso VI". Anuario de Estudios Medievales. 27 (2): 749–73. doi:10.3989/aem.1997.v27.i2.623.
- Estepa Díez, Carlos (2006). "Frontera, nobleza y señoríos en Castilla: el señorío de Molina (siglos XII–XIII)". Studia historica: Historia medieval. 24.
- Fortún Pérez de Ciriza, Luis Javier (2000). "La quiebra de la soberanía navarra en Alava, Guipúzcoa y el Duranguesado (1199–1200)" (PDF). Revista internacional de los estudios vascos. 45 (2). Archived from the original (PDF) on 2020-11-30.
- Lema Pueyo, José Á. (1988). "Las tenencias navarras de Alfonso I "el Batallador"". Príncipe de Viana, Anejo. 8: 61–70.
- Lema Pueyo, José Á. (1997). Instituciones politicas del reinado de Alfonso I «el Batallador», rey de Aragón y Pamplona (1104–1134). Bilbao: Servicio Editorial de la Universidad del País Vasco.
- Lema Pueyo, José Á. (1998). "Las cofradías y la introduccíon del Temple en los reinos de Aragón y Pamplona: guerra, intereses y piedad religiosa". Anuario de Estudios Medievales. 28: 311–31. doi:10.3989/aem.1998.v28.i0.588.
- Lema Pueyo, José Á. (2008). Alfonso I el Batallador, rey de Aragón y Pamplona (1104–1134). Gijón: Trea.
- Moya Valgañón, José G. (1993). "El trazado del camino de Santiago en la Rioja: aspectos de planeamiento y construcción". Semana de Estudios Medievales de Nájera. 4.
- Reilly, Bernard F. (1998). The Kingdom of León-Castilla Under King Alfonso VII, 1126–1157. Philadelphia: University of Pennsylvania Press.
- Stalls, William Clay (1992). "The Written Word in the Aragonese Reconquista". Anuario de Estudios Medievales. 22.
- Stalls, William Clay (1995). Possessing the Land: Aragon's Expansion Into Islam's Ebro Frontier under Alfonso the Battler, 1104–1134. Leiden: Brill.
