= Sancho VI of Navarre =

King of Navarre from 1150 to 1194

Sancho Garcés VI
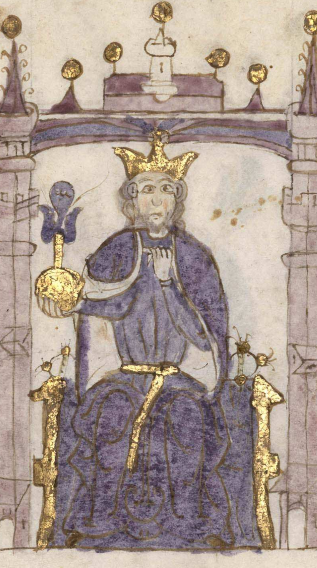
- Miniature of Sancho VI in the Compendium of chronicles about kings, Biblioteca Nacional, Madrid

King of Navarre
- Reign: 1150 – 1194
- Predecessor: García Ramírez
- Successor: Sancho VII

King of the Kingdom of Artajona
- Reign: 1157–1158
- Predecessor: Sancho III of Castile
- Successor: Position abolished
- Born: 21 April 1132
- Died: 27 June 1194 (aged 62); Pamplona, Kingdom of Navarre
- Consort: Sancha of Castile (m. 1153; died 1179)
- Issue: Berengaria, Queen of England; Sancho VII, King of Navarre; Blanche, Countess of Champagne
- House: Jiménez
- Father: García Ramírez of Navarre
- Mother: Margaret of L'Aigle

Sancho Garcés VI (Basque: Antso VI.a; 21 April 1132 – 27 June 1194), called the Wise (Basque: Jakituna, Spanish: el Sabio) was King of Navarre from 1150 until his death in 1194. He was the first monarch to officially drop the title of King of Pamplona in favour of King of Navarre, thus changing the designation of his kingdom. Sancho Garcés was responsible for bringing his kingdom into the political orbit of Europe. He was the eldest son of García Ramírez, the Restorer and Margaret of L'Aigle.

== Biography ==
Incomplete royal seal of Sancho VI.

Sancho VI inherited a debilitated kingdom, subject of frequent raids by the Kingdom of Castile of Alfonso VII and by the County of Barcelona of Ramon Berenguer IV, also king of Aragon, who in 1140 had agreed the partition of the kingdom in the Treaty of Carrión.

He tried to repair the borders of his kingdom, which had been reduced by the Treaties of Tudején and Carrión, which he had been forced to sign with Castile and Aragón in his early reign. By the Accord of Soria, Castile was eventually confirmed in its possession of conquered territories. In the face of a possible Castilian military takeover of further western Navarrese territories, Sancho VI re-asserted royal authority by founding several towns in 1181, including San Sebastián, Vitoria and Treviño, among others.

He was hostile to Count Raymond Berengar IV of Barcelona, but Raymond's son King Alfonso II of Aragon divided the lands taken from Murcia with him by treaty of Sangüesa in 1168. In 1190, the two neighbours again signed a pact in Borja of mutual protection against Castilian expansion.

The Kingdom of Artajona was returned from Sancho III of Castile to Sancho the Wise in 1157.

He died on 27 June 1194, in Pamplona, where he is buried.

== Marriage and family ==
On 20 July 1153, Sancho Garcés married Sancha of Castile, daughter of Alfonso VII, King of León and Castile and his wife Berengaria of Barcelona. They had six children:

- Berengaria Sánchez, who became Queen consort of England after her marriage in 1191 to Richard I. She died childless.
- Sancho Sánchez, nicknamed the Strong, who succeeded his father and ruled as King of Navarre from 1194 to 1234, married first to Constance of Toulouse and then a second time to a woman believed to have been daughter of Frederick I, Holy Roman Emperor or, according to other sources, of Yusuf II, caliph of Morocco.
- Blanche Sánchez, who became Countess of Champagne after her marriage to Theobald III and Count regent after his death. Her son Theobald would become King of Navarre after the death of his uncle.
- Fernando Sánchez, buried at the Abbey of Santa María la Real de Las Huelgas.
- Teresa Sánchez
- Constanza Sánchez, buried in Marcilla.

== Sources ==
- Gómez Moreno, Manuel (1946). El Panteón de las Huelgas Reales de Burgos (in Spanish). Madrid: Instituto Diego Velázquez. Consejo Superior de Investigaciones Científicas. OCLC 641865520.
- Jimeno Jurío, José María (1970). "El libro rubro de Iranzu" (PDF). Príncipe de Viana (120–121). Pamplona: 221–270. ISSN 0032-8472.
- Luscombe, David; Riley-Smith, Jonathan, eds. (2004). The New Cambridge Medieval History: Volume 4, C.1024-c.1198, Part II. Cambridge University Press.
- O'Callaghan, Joseph F. (1975). A History of Medieval Spain. Cornell University Press.

Sancho VI of Navarre House of Jiménez Born: 21 Apr 1132 Died: 27 June 1194
Regnal titles
Preceded by García Ramírez	King of Navarre; 1150–1194	Succeeded by Sancho VII
