= L'Aigle family =

Medieval Norman family

The l'Aigle family was a Norman family that derived from the town of L'Aigle on the southeastern border of the Duchy of Normandy. They first appear in historical records in the early 11th century, during the rule of Duke Richard II of Normandy, and continuously held L'Aigle for the Norman Dukes and Kings of England until the first half of the 13th century, when with the fall of Normandy to the French crown the last of the line was forced to abandon their ancestral lands in France, only to die in England a few years later without surviving English heirs. Their position in the borderlands near the headwaters of three rivers, the Risle, Iton and Avre, gave their small holding a special importance, as did a set of marriage connections that provided this relatively minor Norman noble family with a more elevated historical visibility. Having been neighbors and benefactors of the Abbey of Saint-Evroul, the family received mostly favourable coverage in the 12th-century chronicle of Orderic Vitalis.

== Foundation and initial rise ==
The earliest-known member of the family was Fulbert de Beina, who built a castle "in the time of Duke Richard", hence before Richard's death in 1026. The location of his origin, as represented by his toponymic Beina, remains unidentified, and it is not possible to definitively identify him among the several men named Fulbert appearing at the ducal court.

Fulbert's son, Engenulf, lord of L'Aigle, was a benefactor of the local religious houses at Saint-Evroul and Saint-Sulpice-sur-Risle, their own foundation. To the former, he and his wife, Richeroeda, donated the warhorse of their eldest son, Roger, following his death. Engenulf only appears with the Norman Duke in a document from Fécamp, just prior to the Norman Conquest of England, in which Engenulf was the only prominent Norman nobleman to be killed at the Battle of Hastings. His sister Hiltrude married another prominent local baron, William fitz Giroie, while Engenulf's son and successor, Richer, married Judith, daughter of Richard le Goz, Viscount of Avranches, indicating a rise in the family's standing among the Norman nobility.

Richer, the new lord of L'Aigle, was unable to capitalize on his father's sacrifice, his family only holding two English manors in 1086, Witley and Mildenhall, and unlike many Norman families, the L'Aigles did not shift their centre of power to England. Richer did appear at the royal court in 1081 and a brother, Robert, served the Anglo-Norman nobleman Robert de Tosny of Belvoir. Like his father, Richer died fighting for William the Conqueror at the Siege of Sainte-Suzanne in 1084, where his brother Gilbert of L'Aigle led a revenge assault in January 1085. As "Gilbert de Aquila", this famous Norman knight was featured in Rudyard Kipling's tale "Old Men at Pevensey", part of his 1906 short story collection Puck of Pook's Hill. He was given the castle of Exmes by Robert Curthose in 1089. Under the leadership of two Gilberts, Richer's brother and son of the same name, the family continued to support the Norman dukes, though it becomes difficult to distinguish the two prior to the death of the elder Gilbert, who was killed at Moulins-la-Marche in an ambush by vassals of Geoffrey, Count of Mortagne, in what may have been a kidnapping and ransom scheme gone awry. To prevent bloody reprisals, Count Geoffrey offered his daughter Juliana in marriage to the younger Gilbert, Richer's son. This marriage would provide the family with a web of prominent connections that included Alfonso the Battler, King of Navarre and Aragon, who was the bride's first cousin. The family also married again into the Anglo-Norman nobility, perhaps through the influence of Richer's wife Judith and her brother, Hugh, Earl of Chester, as their daughter Matilda married Robert de Mowbray, Earl of Northumberland, later divorcing the disgraced Earl and taking his lands with her into a second marriage with a royal favourite, Nigel d'Aubigny.

Gilbert, lord of L'Aigle, would serve successive Norman dukes, first Robert Curthose, then following his departure, William II of England, who would leave him to garrison Le Mans after its capture. With the latter's death, Gilbert is found both in England with Henry I and in Normandy with Robert, but an ongoing squabble between his brother-in-law, Count Rotrou of Mortagne, and the latter's kinsman, Curthose's ally Robert de Belleme, seems to have driven Gilbert firmly into the king's camp, and Henry would meet with Archbishop Anselm at L'Aigle in 1105. Gilbert became the agent of Henry I of England in Normandy after the king succeeded in wresting it from his brother the next year. His loyalty to the king was also rewarded by the grant of lands in England, in the Rape of Pevensey. His death occurred on a 15 May, the year being not precisely known, but after 1114 and before 1118. His younger brother, Richard had by 1089 or 1090 joined the Norman adventurers in Italy, and would there become Duke of Gaeta and Count of Suessa, dying in 1111.

== Decline ==
Richer, lord of L'Aigle, would succeed his father in their lands in Normandy, but King Henry had other plans for the family's Pevensey holdings, intending to give them to Richer's brothers, Engenulf and Geoffrey. Richer, for his part, threatened to turn L'Aigle over to King Louis VI of France if the English king would not give him his father's English possessions, and about the same time he dabbled in supporting William Clito's claim to Normandy. In spite of the threatened betrayal, Henry still refused to allow Richer to inherit the English lands, but was brought around when Richer's uncle, Count Rotrou, hinted that were he to support the L'Aigle lord, Henry risked losing his Norman southern marches. Receiving his English inheritance, Richer backed out of his plan to surrender L'Aigle to Louis, but the French king then took it by force, apparently in 1118, and it was only a year later that Henry was able to take it back. L'Aigle was restored to Richer, again through Rotrou's influence, but the young lord had lost the king's confidence and would only appear at court once during the rest of Henry's reign. It was presumably during a visit to administer his English lands that he stayed with Gilbert Becket and became friends with the latter's son, the future Archbishop Thomas Becket, who perhaps even served as Richer's notary. Richer primarily involved himself in local Norman affairs, joining his neighbor Eustace de Pacy in his struggles over the lands around Breteuil, and in the process ravaging Saint-Evroul lands and attracting the vitriol of its chronicler, Orderic. The dispossessed brothers, Engenulf and Geoffrey, would die in 1120 in the wreck of the White Ship along with Rotrou's son and wife, and the Count would leave his County of Perche in the hands of his sister Juliana, Richer's mother, and turn his attention to fighting Muslims in Aragon. There in 1130 he would arrange the marriage of Richer's sister, Margaret, to a royal scion, García Ramírez, lord of Monzón, who was soon to become King of Navarre.

With the succession of King Stephen and his struggle to solidify his southern Norman frontier, Richer was again to gain royal access, and again the relationship with Rotrou paid dividends. Henry had built frontier castles in the region, bypassing L'Aigle and the untrustworthy Richer in the process, but Stephen granted two of these to Rotrou and his nephew, with Richer receiving Bonsmoulins. Richer was in England in 1139 recruiting troops for Stephen, and was again headed for England in 1140 when he was set upon, taken captive and imprisoned at Breteuil by another of Stephen's men, Robert de Beaumont, Earl of Leicester, as a result of a private dispute, Robert having received the lands confiscated by Henry from Richer's ally, Eustace de Pacy. In spite of his uncle Rotrou's intercession on Richer's behalf, a weakened King Stephen did not have the power to force his release. Rotrou then turned to Stephen's ascendant Angevin rivals, only to see a reversal of fortune that restored Stephen's control. Though Richer was released, a resentful Stephen deprived him of his lands in Sussex. In 1152, Richer alienated another prince, the Angevin Henry, apparently by supporting another scheme of French king Louis. Henry burned Bonsmoulins and took hostages. To make matters worse, the next year Henry was named Stephen's heir, and thus a new king brought Richer no respite from royal displeasure. Richer seems to have reached a rapprochement with the new king in the late 1050s, surrendering Bonsmoulins but again holding at least a portion of his lost English lands, though he largely disappears from royal records. He also appears also to have reached accommodation with his former captor, the Earl of Leicester, but this led to additional misfortune: Richer appears to have sided with the Earl's successor in the rebellion of Henry the Young King, and thereby again lost his Sussex land. They were again restored in 1174. His death in 1176 brought an end to a career that had squandered his father's power and royal good will through a particular penchant for choosing the wrong side in one conflict after another.

Richer, lord of L'Aigle, the son of Richer and his wife Beatrix, would succeed his father, but he and his wife Odelina left little documentary record. He appears to have spent his time primarily in and around his Norman lands. He disappears from English scutage records in the mid-1180s, and is thought to have died about 1186.

== End ==
Gilbert, lord of L'Aigle, son of Richer and Odelina, would go a good way toward recovering the family's status in one swipe, when as follower of William of Salisbury, 2nd Earl of Salisbury, he would marry the earl's niece, a rich and well-connected widow, Isabel de Warenne, daughter of Hamelin de Warenne, Earl of Surrey, King Henry's half-brother, and Isabel de Warenne, Countess of Surrey, heiress to one of the most powerful Anglo-Norman families. She brought with her her own lands as well as the dower right to those of her first husband, Robert de Lacy, lord of Pontefract. In addition, Gilbert found favour with the new king, John, who succeeded in 1199. This royal access would be short-lived, as John almost immediately struggled to retain control over his kingdom, and when Gilbert left the royal court without permission to go defend his Norman lands, John confiscated his property in England. Gilbert's English holdings would be rescued through the intervention of Gilbert's brother-in-law, William de Warenne, Earl of Surrey, who pledged 3000 marks hold Gilbert's lands during his absence, and when Gilbert finally returned to England about 1215, he resumed possession. However, things came to a head in 1216. Gilbert had married his daughter, Alice, to John de Lacy, Constable of Chester, who was one of the leaders of the opposition to King John, and when control of Pevensey castle was given to the Earl of Arundel, Gilbert turned to the rebels in their attempt to make the French ruler Louis VIII king. Negotiations to bring Gilbert back into the royalist fold following the death of John and succession of Henry III came to nought, though Gilbert managed to retain control of his properties after Louis' 1217 defeat. However, the fall of most of Normandy to the French left him with land in two separate kingdoms ruled by mutually hostile monarchs. He would fight for Henry in Wales in 1225, then with Louis in Languedoc in 1226 and 1227, only to have Henry seize his English lands when he was away too long. Forced to choose, he opted for England, abandoning his family's Norman lands, including L'Aigle. He founded Michelham Priory in 1229, and in 1230 he joined Henry in his attack on France, as well as another against Wales the next year. He died later in 1231, and having outlived all of his children and his only grandchild, the L'Aigle properties in England reverted to the crown. His nearest French-loyal relative, Henry III d'Avaugour, titular Count of Penthièvre, would receive many of the family's Norman lands.

L'Aigle lords

Fulbert de Beina; Lord of L'Aigle fl. bef. 1026
William fitz Giroie | Hiltrude | Engenulf; Lord of L'Aigle k. 1066 | Richeroeda | Richard le Goz; Viscount of Avranches
Sancho; Ramírez; King of Navarre and Aragon | Felicia de Ramerupt | Geoffrey II; Count of Perche | Beatrice de Ramerupt | Gilbert 'de Aquila' | Richer; Lord of L'Aigle k. 1085 | Judith d'Avranches | Hugh; Earl of Chester
Alfonso I King of Navarre and Aragon | Ramiro II; King of Aragon | Rotrou III; Count of Perche | Juliane of Perche | Gilbert; Lord of L'Aigle d. 1115/1117 | Richard 'dell'Aquila'; Duke of Gaeta d. 1111 | Robert de Mowbray; Earl of Northumbria | Matilda | Nigel d'Aubigny
García; Ramírez; King of Navarre | Margaret | Engenulf d. 1120 | Geoffrey d. 1120 | Richer; Lord of L'Aigle d. 1176 | Beatrix
Matilda of England | Geoffrey; Plantagenet | William; Earl of Surrey | Ela; Talvas | Patrick; Earl of Salisbury
Henry II; King of England | Hamelin; Earl of Surrey | Isabel; Countess of Surrey | William; Earl of Salisbury | Richer; Lord of L'Aigle d. ca. 1186 | Odelina | Richard; Viscount of Beaumont-le-Vicomte | Lucie
William; Earl of Surrey | Robert se Lacy | Isabel de Warenne | Gilbert; Lord of L'Aigle d. 1231 | Alan d'Avaugour | Alice de Beaumont | Ermengarde de Beaumont | William I King of Scotland
John de Lacy; Earl of Lincoln | Alice d. 1216 | Henri III d'Avaugour (French heir)
Joan de Lacy d. young
