= Pact of Vadoluengo =

The Pact of Vadoluengo was an agreement between García V of Navarre and Ramiro II of Aragon signed in January 1135 at the hamlet of Vadoluengo, near Leyre. It subordinated Navarre to Aragon and defined their boundary. It was effective for five months, but in May it was unilaterally abrogated by Navarre.

When Alfonso the Battler, the king of Aragon and Navarre, died in September 1134, separate claimants arose for his two kingdoms. His own will specified that both kingdoms should pass to the military orders, but it was disregarded in the succession crisis. In Aragon, Alfonso's younger brother, Ramiro, a childless monk was elected king by the nobility. In Navarre, García, a scion of the old Navarrese branch of the ruling house, was elected in an effort to restore Navarre's independence. The old Muslim kingdom of Zaragoza, which Alfonso had conquered, was occupied by Castile.

The Pact of Vadoluengo was negotiated and signed on behalf of the king of Aragon by Fortún Garcés Cajal, Pedro de Atarés and Ferriz de Huesca, and on behalf of the king of Navarre by Ladrón Íñiguez, Guillermo Aznárez de Oteiza and Jimeno Aznárez de Torres. They agreed that the border would be the same as that of 1035, when Sancho III of Navarre set up Aragon as a separate kingdom. Four disputed locations—Alasues, Cadreita, Roncal and Valtierra—were assigned to García, who was to perform homage to Ramiro for them. The pact referred to Ramiro as the "father" (pater) and García as the "son" (filius), language that indicated not only the latter's subordinate status but probably also his status as heir to the childless and unmarried ex-monk.

Following the signing, Ramiro went to Pamplona, where he was received as king in a ceremony. Thereafter, while the pact was in effect, Aragonese charters usually name him as king in Pamplona with García ruling under him. The usual form in Ramiro's own charters was label García as ruling "under my hand" (sub manu mea) or "under my empire" (sub meum imperium). Navarrese charters are more circumspect, usually naming Ramiro and García as kings without specifying their relationship.

Shortly after 5 May, García abandoned the Pact of Vadoluengo. He met Alfonso VII of León, probably in the vicinity of Nájera, and agreed to become his vassal for Navarre.

== Sources ==
- Balaguer Sánchez, Federico (1950). "La ciudad de Barbastro y las negociaciones diplomáticas de Ramiro II". Argensola: Revista de Ciencias Sociales del Instituto de Estudios Altoaragoneses. 2: 133–58. ISSN 0518-4088.
- Barber, Malcolm (1994). The New Knighthood: A History of the Order of the Temple. Cambridge University Press.
- Reilly, Bernard F. (1998). The Kingdom of León-Castilla Under King Alfonso VII, 1126–1157. Philadelphia: University of Pennsylvania Press.
- Ubieto Arteta, Antonio (1981). Historia de Aragón, I: La formación territorial. Zaragoza: Anubar. ISBN 84-7013-1818.
