= Blanca of Navarre, Queen of Castile =

Blanca
- Born: after 1133; Laguardia, Álava
- Died: 12 August 1156
- Spouse: Sancho III of Castile (m. 1151)
- Issue: Alfonso VIII
- House: Jiménez
- Father: García Ramírez of Navarre
- Mother: Margaret of L'Aigle

Blanca (Basque: Blanka Garzeitz, Spanish: Blanca Garcés; aft. 1133, Laguardia, Álava – August 12, 1156) was Queen consort of Castile, daughter of King García Ramírez of Navarre and his first wife, Margaret of L'Aigle. She married Sancho III of Castile. One year after her death, he became King of Castile in 1157 regent of Castile (subject to his father Alfonso VII) on February 4, 1151, in Carrión de los Condes, Palencia, after travelling from Calahorra, Logroño, in January. The marriage was arranged to insure closer ties between León-Castile and Navarre. As was traditional, Blanca confirmed documents with her husband, so her activity may be traced until 1155.

On November 11, 1155, she gave birth to the future king Alfonso VIII. There appears to be no record of her activities after December 1155, and she died on August 12, 1156. The cause of her death seems to have been complications of a new pregnancy, a child named García. In addition, she had other children buried in the church of San Pedro in Soria, although they are not identified.

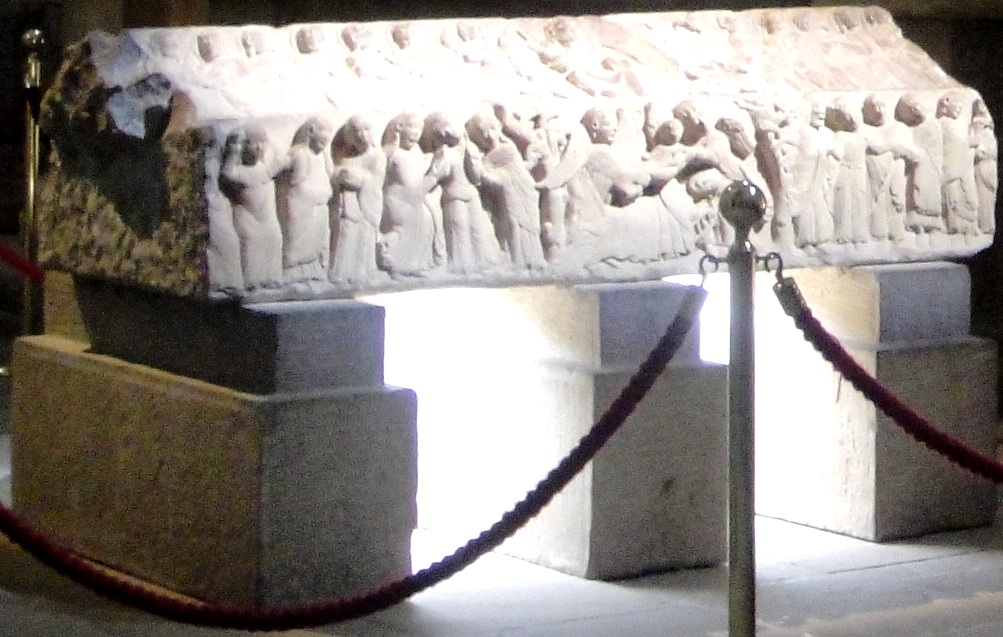
Cover of the sarcophagus of Blanca of Navarre

That her death was caused by a pregnancy is recorded in an epitaph engraved on her tomb; however, the engraving did not survive a 16th-century reconstruction of the royal tombs in Nájera. Her sarcophagus lid was preserved, and it represents the queen's deathbed with members of the court, including her husband, mourning her death. Blanca was buried in the pantheon of the Navarrese kings in the monastery called Santa María la Real of Nájera, to which Sancho made donations on her behalf.
