= Margaret of L'Aigle =

Queen of Navarre from 1134 to 1141

Queen consort of Navarre
- Tenure: 1134–1141
- Died: 25 May 1141
- Spouse: García Ramírez of Navarre
- Issue: Sancho VI of Navarre; Blanche, Queen of Castile; Margaret, Queen of Sicily; Henry, Count of Montescaglioso
- House: L'Aigle
- Father: Gilbert of L'Aigle
- Mother: Juliana du Perche

Sketch of an incompletely preserved seal of Margaret's son Sancho VI, shown on a horse in the Mediterranean style

Margaret of L'Aigle (French: Marguerite de L'Aigle, Spanish: Margarita de L’Aigle) (died 1141) was Queen of Navarre as the first wife to García Ramírez of Navarre. She was the daughter of Gilbert of L'Aigle and Juliana du Perche, daughter of Geoffrey II, Count of Perche.

== Life ==
Though daughter of the Anglo-Norman lord of L'Aigle, Margaret had connections with the region where she would marry. Her maternal grandmother, Beatrice of Montdidier, was sister of Felicia, Queen of Navarre and Aragon. Her uncle, Rotrou III, Count of Perche, had fled Normandy in despair after a family tragedy, the loss of his wife, son, and two nephews, Margaret's brothers Engenulf and Geoffrey of L'Aigle, in the 1120 wreck of the White Ship. Leaving Margaret's mother Juliana in charge of his County of Perche, Rotrou returned to Aragon, where he had earlier spent time fighting, and while there this second time, he arranged Margaret's marriage.

== Marriage and children ==
Margaret was married in 1130 to García Ramírez, lord of Monzón, four years before his unexpected election to the throne of Navarre. He confirmed the rights and privileges of the church of Pamplona on the advice of "uxoris mee Margarite regina" by charter dated 1135.

Margaret was to bear García:

- Sancho VI
- Blanca, born after 1133, married Sancho III of Castile
- Margaret, named after her mother, married William I of Sicily

Garcia's relationship with Margaret was, however, unstable. She supposedly took many lovers and showed favouritism to her French relatives. She bore a second son named Rodrigo, whom her husband refused to recognise as his own. He was never acknowledged as a son by the Navarrese king, even after Margaret's death, and he was widely considered a bastard, though his sister Margaret did not treat him as such. He certainly never behaved as anything other than the son of a king.

Margaret died on May 25, 1141.

Margaret's husband later remarried, yet her younger daughter remembered her fondly.

== Sources ==
- Alio, Jacqueline (2016). Margaret, Queen of Sicily. Trinacria, New York.
- Luscombe, David; Riley-Smith, Jonathan, eds. (2004). The New Cambridge Medieval History: Volume 4, C.1024-c.1198, Part II. Cambridge University Press.
- Thompson, Kathleen (2002). Power and Border Lordship in Medieval France: The County of the Perche, 1000–1226. The Boydell Press.
- Martínez de Aguirre, Javier (2014). "Margarita de l'Aigle (+25 mayo 1411) y Urraca la asturiana (1132-¿1164–1179?): esposas de García Ramírez el Restaurador". Reinas de Navarra (in Spanish). pp. 267–297. ISBN 978-84-7737-840-2.

Royal titles
Preceded by Urraca of Léon	Queen consort of Navarre; 1134–1141	Succeeded by Urraca of Castile
