= García Ramírez of Navarre =

King of Pamplona from 1134 to 1150

García Ramírez
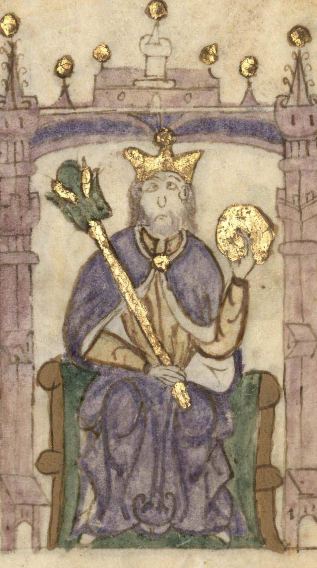
- García Ramírez in the Semblanzas de reyes

King of Navarre
- Reign: 1134 – 1150
- Predecessor: Alfonso
- Successor: Sancho VI
- Born: c. 1112
- Died: 21 November 1150; Yerri
- Spouses: Margaret of L'Aigle (m. 1130; died 1141) Urraca of Castile (m. 1144)
- Issue: Sancho VI the Wise; Blanca, Queen of Castile; Margaret, Queen of Sicily; Henry, Count of Montescaglioso; Sancha, Viscountess of Béarn
- House: House of Jiménez
- Father: Ramiro Sánchez
- Mother: Cristina Rodríguez

García Ramírez (Basque: Gartzea Remiritz), sometimes García IV (Note: Counting García Sánchez I, II, and III), V (Note: Counting García Íñiguez), VI (Note: Counting García Jiménez of Pamplona) or VII (Note: Counting García Ennéguiz I, legendary king of Sobrarbe) (c. 1112 – 21 November 1150), called the Restorer (Spanish: el Restaurador, Basque: Berrezarlea), was the King of Navarre (Pamplona) from 1134. The election of García Ramírez restored the independence of the Navarrese kingdom after 58 years of political union with the Kingdom of Aragon. After some initial conflict he would align himself with king Alfonso VII of León and Castile, and as his ally take part in the Reconquista.

== Biography ==
García was born to Ramiro Sánchez, lord of Monzón, whose own father Sancho was an illegitimate son of king García Sánchez III of Navarre. His mother was Cristina, daughter of the Castilian nobleman Rodrigo Díaz de Vivar, better known as El Cid. He succeeded his father as lord of Monzón and also held Logroño.

In 1134, a succession crisis arose in the united kingdoms of Navarre and Aragon. As a consequence of the 1076 murder of king Sancho IV of Navarre by his siblings, Navarre had been partitioned between Castile and Aragon, with the kings of the latter claiming the Navarrese crown. With the death of the childless warrior-king Alfonso the Battler of Navarre and Aragon in 1134, the succession of both kingdoms fell into dispute. In his unusual will, Alfonso had left the combined kingdoms to three crusading orders, which effectively neutralized the Papacy from exercising a role in selecting among the potential candidates. Immediately rejected the will, the nobility of Aragon favored Alfonso's younger brother Ramiro, a monk. The nobility of Navarre, skeptical of Ramiro having the necessary temperament to resist the incursions by their western neighbor, king Alfonso VII of León and Castile, who was another claimant, and perhaps chafing under the continued Aragonese hegemony, initially favored a different candidate, Pedro de Atarés, a grandson of Alfonso's illegitimate uncle, Sancho Ramírez, Count of Ribagorza. A convocation of the bishops and nobility was convened at Pamplona to decide between Pedro and Ramiro, but were so alienated by Pedro's arrogance that they abandoned him in favor of García Ramírez, Lord of Monzón, a scion of their own dynasty, grandson of a brother of their murdered king Sancho IV. He was duly elected by the nobility and clergy of Navarre, while Ramiro was enthroned by that of Aragon and strongly opposed García's election in Navarre.

In light of this, the Bishop of Pamplona granted García his church's treasure to fund his government against Ramiro's pretensions. Among García's other early supporters were Lop Ennechones, Martinus de Leit, and Count Latro, who carried out negotiations on the king's behalf with Ramiro. Eventually, however, in January 1135 with the Pact of Vadoluengo the two monarchs reached a mutual accord of "adoption": García was deemed the "son" and Ramiro the "father" in an attempt to maintain both the independence of each kingdom and the de facto supremacy of the Aragonese one. In May 1135, García declared himself a vassal of Alfonso VII. This simultaneously put him under the protection and lordship of Castile and bought recognition of his royal status from Alfonso, who was a claimant to the Battler's succession. García's submission to Castile has been seen as an act of protection for Navarre that had the consequence of putting her in an offensive alliance against Aragon and, now that García had turned to Alfonso, forced Ramiro to marry and to produce an heir and to forge an alliance with Ramon Berenguer IV, Count of Barcelona. On the other hand, García may have been responding to Ramiro's marriage, which proved beyond a doubt that the king of Aragon was seeking another heir than his distant relative and adopted son.

Family tree of candidates for the crowns of Navarre and Aragon, 1134

Candidates for the crowns of Navarre and Aragon in 1134
Marriage and legitimate descent
Liaison and illegitimate descent

Muniadona of Castile	Sancho III of Pamplona	Sancha of Aybar
Stephanie of Barcelona	García; Sánchez III of Navarre	(mistress)	Ferdinand I of León and Castile	Garsendis of Foix	Ramiro I of Aragon	Amuña
Sancho IV of Navarre	Sancho; Garcés of Uncastillo	Alfonso VI of León and Castile	Felicia of Roucy	Sancho; Ramírez of Navarre and Aragon	Isabella of Urgell	Sancho; Ramírez; Count of Ribagorza
Ramiro; Sánchez of Monzón	Urraca of León and Castile	Alfonso the Battler	Ramiro II of Aragon	Peter I of Navarre and Aragon	García; Sánchez of Atarés
García; Ramírez of Navarre	Alfonso VII of León and Castile	Petronilla of Aragon	Ramon; Berenguer IV; Count of Barcelona	Peter of Atarés

Before September 1135, Alfonso VII granted García Zaragoza as a fief. Recently conquered from Aragon, this outpost of Castilian authority in the east was clearly beyond the military capacity of Alfonso to control and provided further reasons for recognition of García in Navarre in return for not only his homage, but his holding Zaragoza on behalf of Castile. In 1136, Alfonso was forced to do homage for Zaragoza to Ramiro and to recognise him as King of Zaragoza. In 1137, Zaragoza was surrendered to Raymond Berengar, though Alfonso retained suzerainty over it. By then, García's reign in Zaragoza had closed.

Sometime after 1130, but before his succession, García married Margaret of L'Aigle. She was to bear him a son and successor, Sancho VI, as well as two daughters who each married kings. The elder, Blanche, born after 1133, was originally to marry Raymond Berengar IV as confirmed by a peace treaty in 1149, in spite of the count's existing betrothal to Petronilla of Aragon, but García died before the marriage could be carried out. Instead she married Sancho III of Castile. The younger daughter, Margaret, married William I of Sicily. García's relationship with his first queen was, however, shaky. She supposedly took on many lovers and showed favouritism to her French relatives. She bore a second son named Rodrigo, whom her husband refused to recognise as his own. On 24 June 1144, in León, García married Urraca, called La Asturiana (the Asturian), illegitimate daughter of Alfonso VII, to strengthen his relationship with his overlord.

In 1136, García was obliged to surrender Rioja to Castile but, in 1137, he allied with Alfonso I of Portugal and confronted Alfonso VII. They confirmed a peace between 1139 and 1140. He was thereafter an ally of Castile in the Reconquista and was instrumental in the conquest of Almería in 1147. In 1146, he occupied Tauste, which belonged to Aragon, and Alfonso VII intervened to mediate a peace between the two kingdoms.

García died on 21 November 1150 in Lorca, near Estella, and was buried in the cathedral of Santa María la Real in Pamplona. He was succeeded by his eldest son. He left one daughter by Urraca: Sancha, who married successively Gaston V of Béarn and Pedro Manrique de Lara.

García left, as the primary monument of his reign, the monastery of Santa María de la Oliva in Carcastillo. It is a fine example of Romanesque architecture.

== Marriage and family ==
García Ramírez married Margaret of L'Aigle, granddaughter of Geoffrey II, Count of Perche. They had four children, but only the first three were recognised by García Ramírez:

- Sancho Garcés, nicknamed the Wise, who ruled as King of Navarre from 1150 until his death in 1194. He would be the first monarch to use the title "of Navarre". He married Sancha of Castile, daughter of Alfonso VII of León, King of Galicia, León and Castile.
- Blanche, married in 1151 to Sancho III of Castile, King of Castile.
- Margaret, married to William I, King of Sicily, and who ruled as Queen regent of Sicily.
- Rodrigo, later known as Henry, made Count of Montescaglioso by his sister, Margaret, Queen regent of Sicily.

On 24 June 1144 he married Urraca of Castile, illegitimate daughter of King Alfonso VII of León and Castile and his mistress Gontrodo Pérez. They were the parents of:

- Sancha (1148–1176), married first to Gaston V of Béarn and secondly to Pedro Manrique de Lara, Viscount of Narbonne and Lord of Molina

== Sources ==
- Casado Lobato, Concepción (1979). "¿Un intento de secesión asturiana en el siglo XII?" (PDF). Asturiensia medievalia (in Spanish). No. 3. Oviedo: Universidad de Oviedo. Departamento de Historia Medieval. pp. 163–172. ISSN 0301-889X.
- Domínguez Fernández, Enrique; Larrambebere Zabal, Miguel (1994). García Ramírez el Restaurador (1134–1150). Reyes de Navarra, vol. 8a. Pamplona: Editorial Mintzoa.
- Grassotti, Hilda (1964). "Homenaje de García Ramírez a Alfonso VII" (PDF). Príncipe de Viana (in Spanish). 25 (94–95): 57–66. ISSN 0032-8472.
- Lourie, Elena (1975). "The Will of Alfonso I, 'El Batallador,' King of Aragon and Navarre: A Reassessment". Speculum. 50 (4. Oct): 635–651. doi:10.2307/2855471. JSTOR 2855471. S2CID 159659007.
- Luscombe, David; Riley-Smith, Jonathan, eds. (2004). The New Cambridge Medieval History: Volume 4, C.1024-c.1198, Part II. Cambridge University Press.
- Mallette, Karla (2005). The Kingdom of Sicily, 1100-1250: A Literary History. University of Pennsylvania Press.
- Norwich, John Julius (1970). The Kingdom in the Sun, 1130–1194. Longmans.
- Pamplona, Germán de (1949). "Filiación y derechos al Trono de Navarra de Garcia Ramirez el Restaurador". Príncipe de Viana (in Spanish). 10 (35/36): 275–83. ISSN 0032-8472.
- Salazar y Acha, Jaime de (1994). "Reflexiones sobre la posible historicidad de un episodio de la Crónica Najerense" (PDF). Príncipe de Viana (in Spanish) (201): 149–156. ISSN 0032-8472.
- Torres Sevilla-Quiñones de León, Margarita Cecilia (1999). Linajes nobiliarios de León y Castilla: Siglos IX-XIII (in Spanish). Salamanca: Junta de Castilla y León, Consejería de educación y cultura. ISBN 84-7846-781-5.

García Ramírez of Navarre House of Jiménez Died: 21 November 1150
Regnal titles
Preceded by Alfonso	King of Navarre; 1134–1150	Succeeded by Sancho VI
