= Witness hill =

Landform type of a Hill with the upper part in Plain

A witness hill is a type of landform created from the erosion of the earth. It is a testimony of the evolution and retreat of a platform or cuesta relief, that is, it is a rest of the platform in a relief where there are layers of hard and soft rocks arranged horizontally in which erosion has sculpted landscapes that are also horizontal. As the erosion produced by the rivers increases in the soft layers, hills are formed, and if the plateau is attacked by erosion from all sides, the witness hills with flat summits appear. They are therefore, the "witnesses" of the platform that existed in that place millions of years ago.

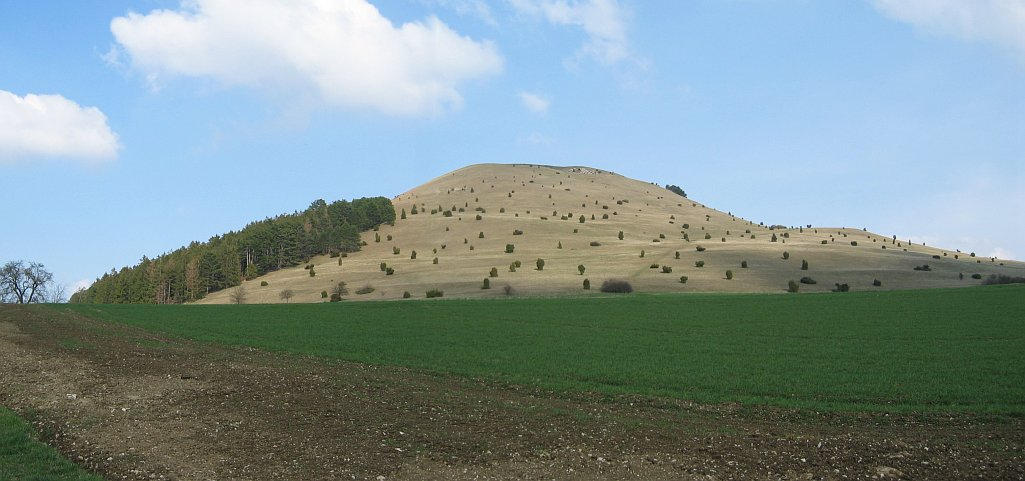
The Ipf in Germany is a various of the witness hills examples.

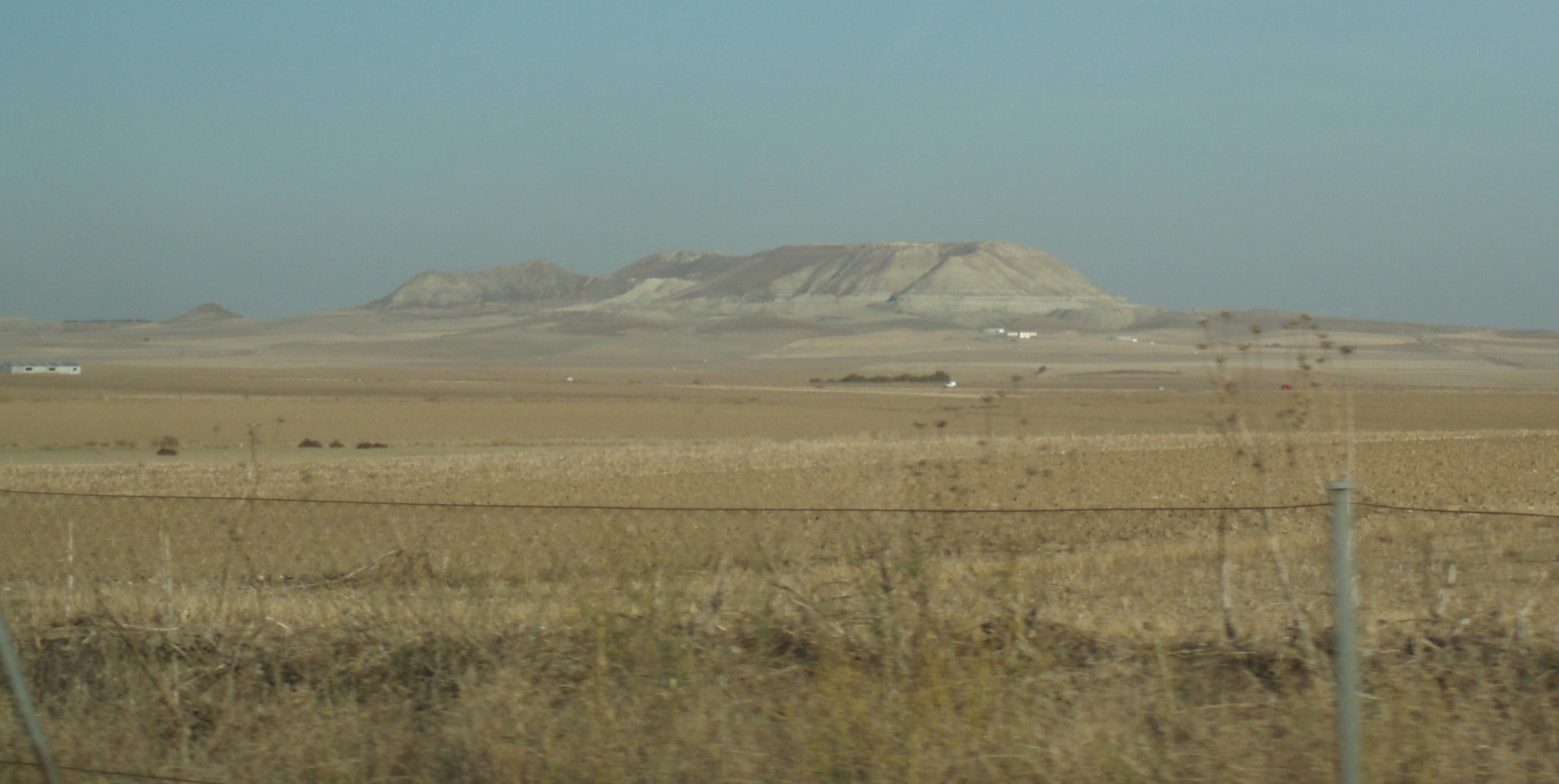
Witness hills range in Toledo Province, Spain.

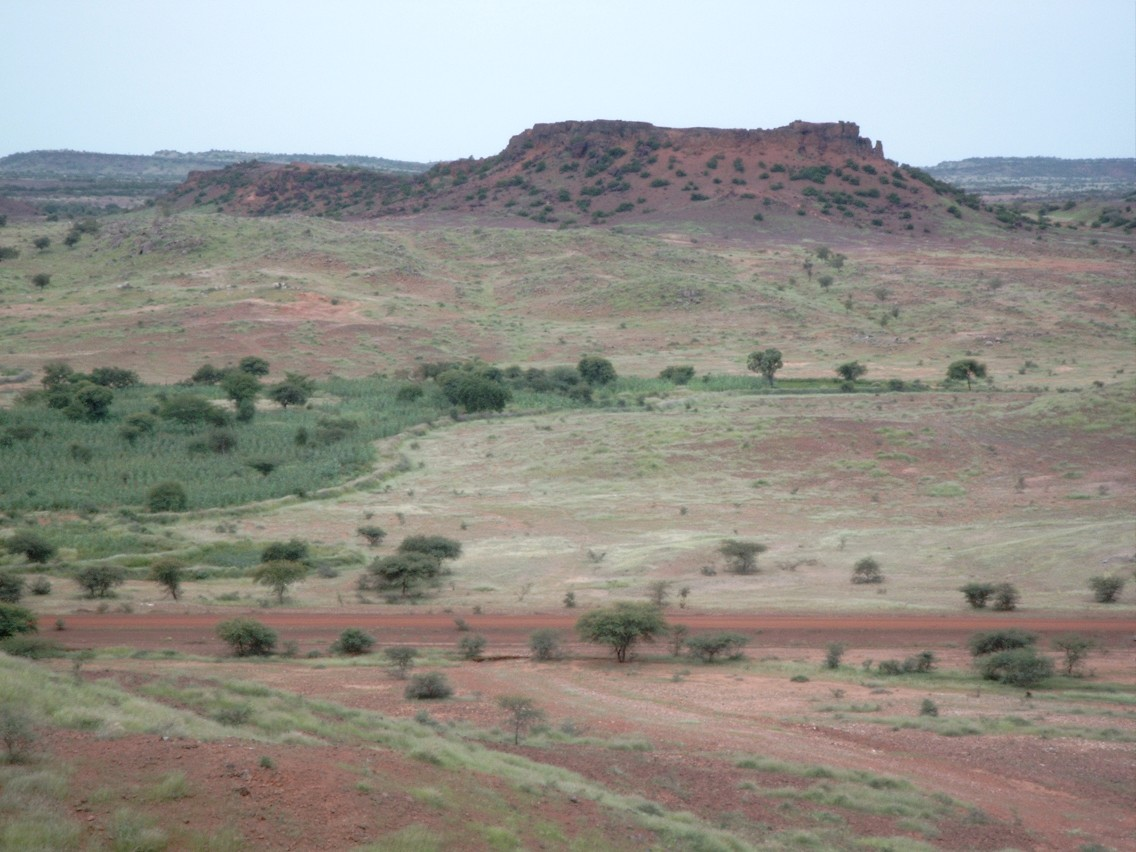
Dori Plateau in Dori, Burkina Faso.

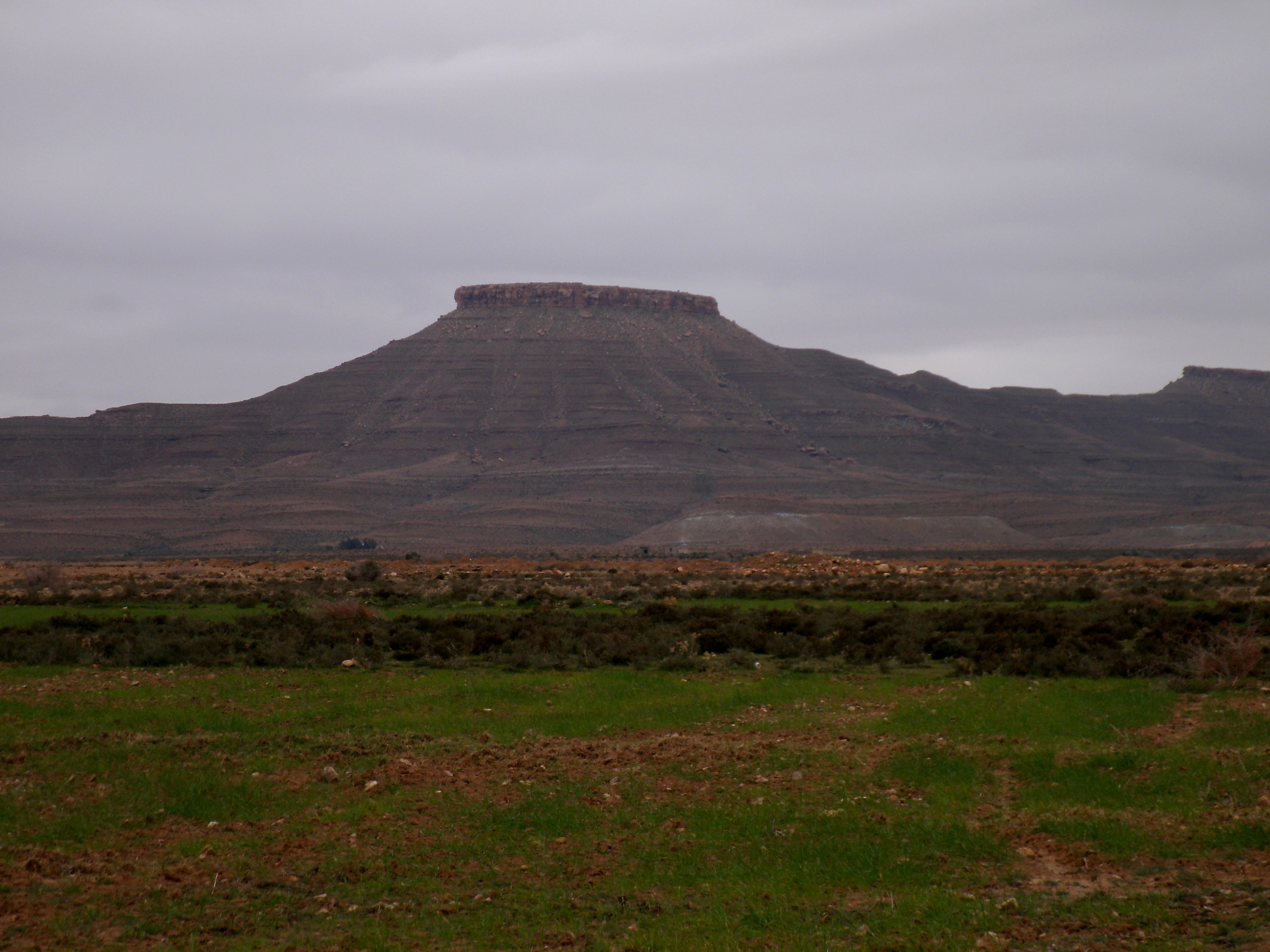
Witness hill in Ouled Naïl Range, Bou Saâda, Algeria.

Some examples of this type of geological formation are: Pilot Mountain, North Carolina, Dori Plateau, Burkina Faso, La Teta Hill, La Guajira Peninsula and the Hills of Guayana, Venezuela. These hills are quite common in the sedimentary basins of the Meseta Central of the Iberian Peninsula, in the Ebro Depression and in the tabular reliefs.
