= Santa María de la Oliva =

- Ex-monasterio Cisterciense de Santa María de la Oliva (Spanish)
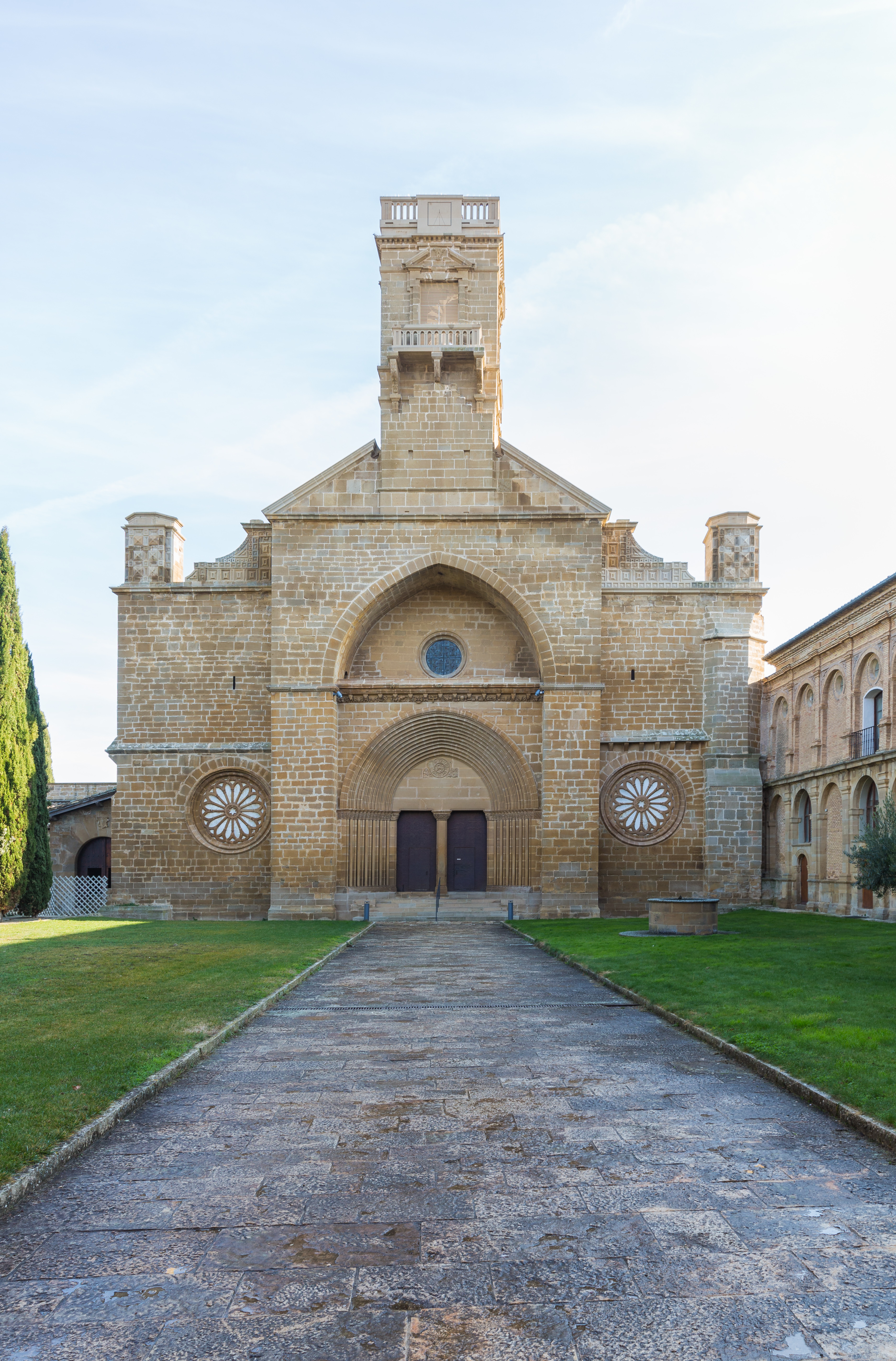

- Location within Spain
- 42.371678°N 1.466532°W
- Location: Carretera Melinda, s/n, 31310 Carcastillo, Navarre, Spain

Site notes
- Architectural style: Cistercian

Spanish Cultural Heritage
- Official name: Ex-monasterio Cisterciense de Santa María de la Oliva
- Type: Non-movable
- Criteria: Monument
- Designated: 1880
- Reference no.: RI-51-0000026

The abbey of Santa María la Real de la Oliva, or simply La Oliva, is a Cistercian monastery in Carcastillo, Navarre, Spain.

An example of Cistercian architecture, the buildings have been protected by a heritage listing since 1880, and the site is currently classed as a Bien de Interés Cultural, the Ex-monasterio Cisterciense de Santa María de la Oliva. Within Navarre, it is part of a large number of Cistercian monasteries such as Fitero, Tulebras or Iranzu.

== Description ==
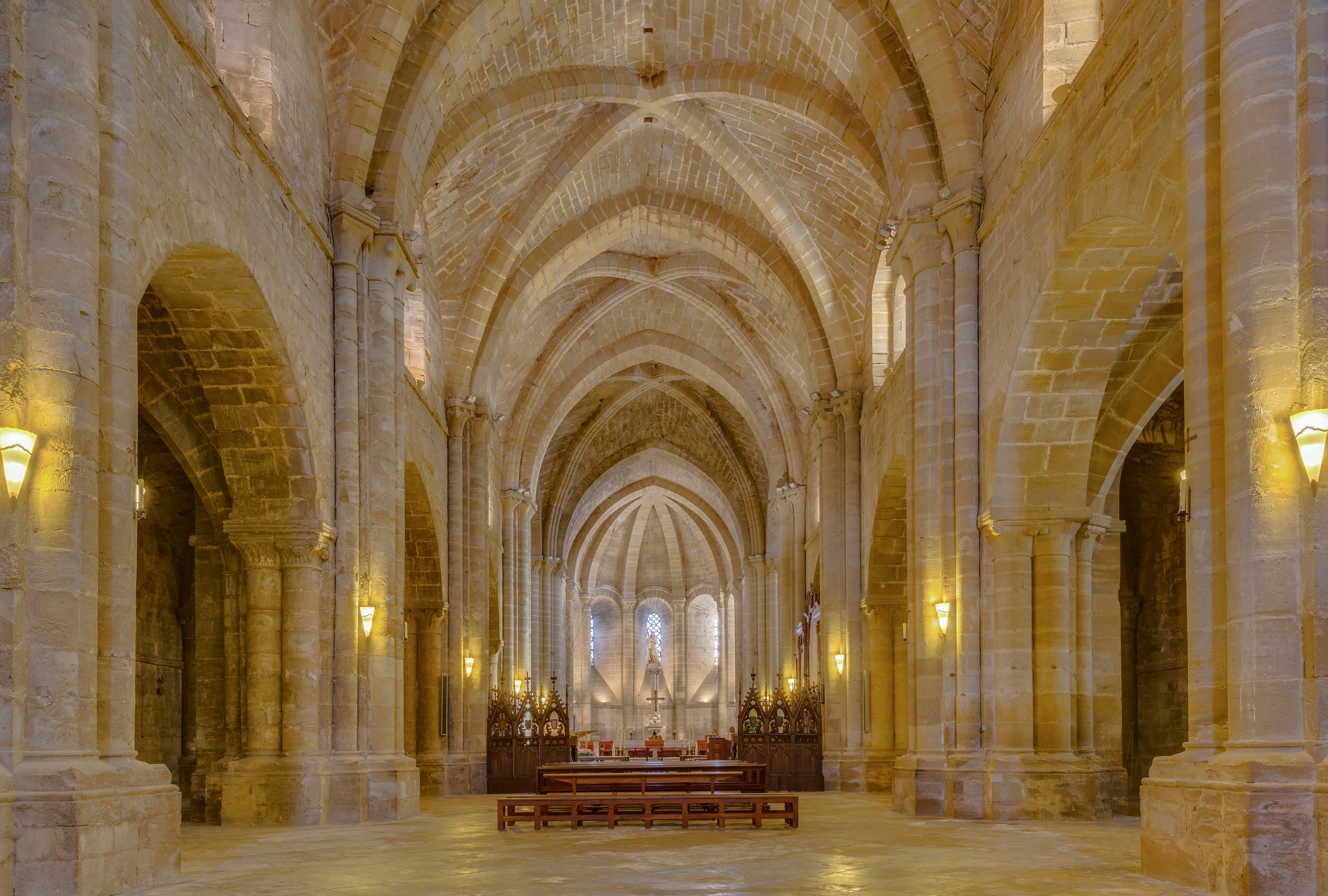
Interior of La Oliva Abbey.

A Cistercian Monastery established in the 12th century, the present buildings date from 13th - 15th centuries. The spacious church, an authentic example of the incipient Cistercian art in the Iberian Peninsula. Its cloister, of Gothic style, the chapter house and the chapel of Saint Jesus Christ, testify to the great artistic importance of this monastery.

== History ==
Construction at the site is attributed first in 1134 to King García Ramírez of Navarre, known as the restorer. This king died in 1150 and the same year the abbey was founded, or refounded, as a daughter house of the Morimond and Escaladieu Abbeys.

After the dissolution of the monastery the retable was moved to Tafalla.

== See also ==
- List of Bien de Interés Cultural in Navarre
