= Carcastillo =

Town in Navarre, Spain

- Municipality
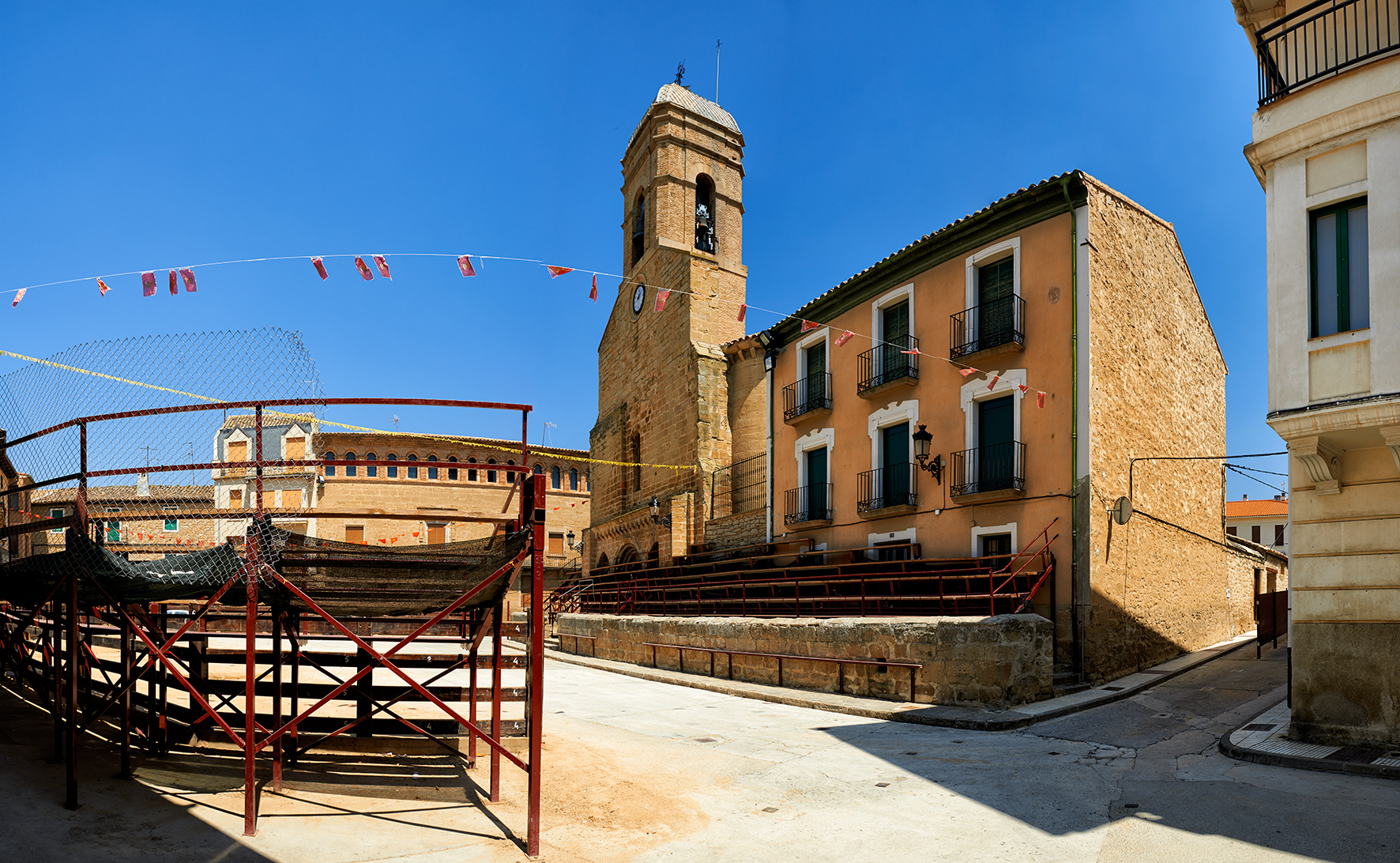
- Church Square

- Flag Coat of arms

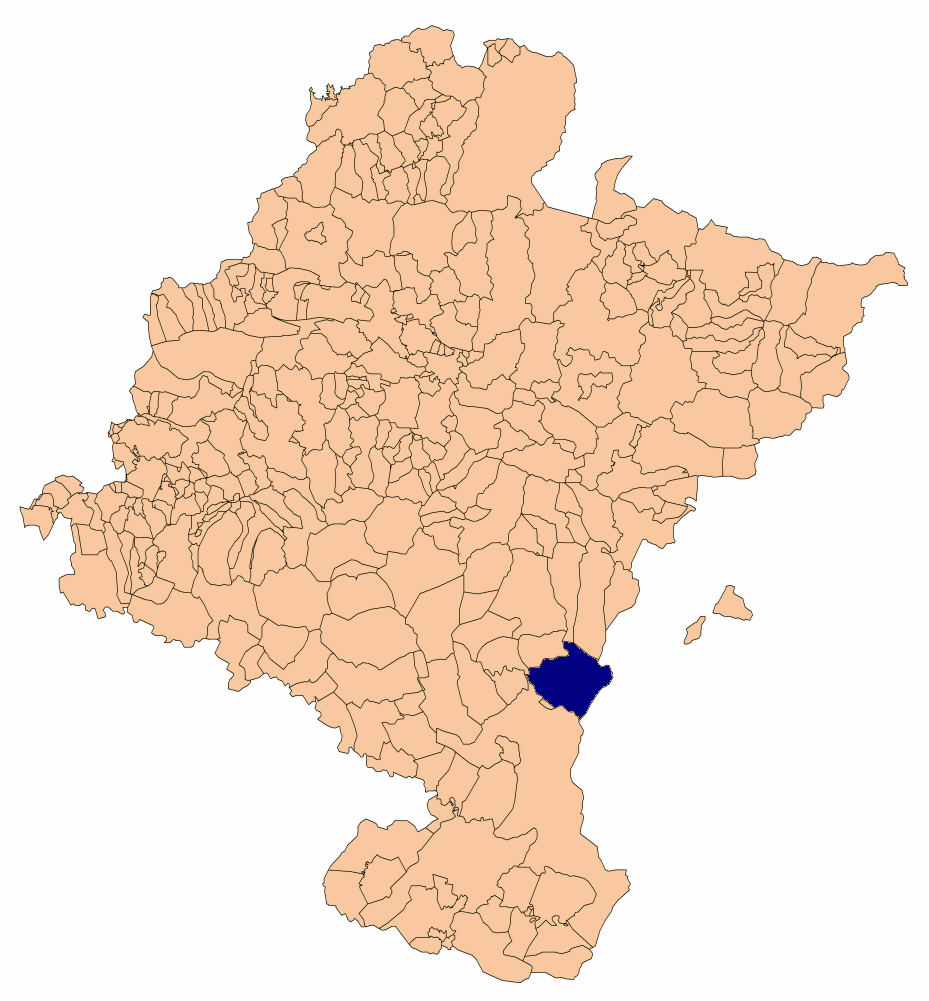

- Location of Carcastillo within Navarre
- Coordinates: 42°22′43″N 1°26′39″W
- Country: Spain
- Autonomous community: Navarre
- Province: Navarre
- Comarca: Ribera Arga-Aragón

Government
  - Mayor: Olaia Fraile Gracia

Area
  - Total: 97.00 km^{2} (37.45 sq mi)
- Elevation: 351 m (1,152 ft)

Population (2025-01-01)
  - Total: 2,408
  - Density: 24.82/km^{2} (64.30/sq mi)
- Time zone: UTC+1 (CET)
  - Summer (DST): UTC+2 (CEST)
- Postal code: 31310
- Official language(s): Spanish
- Website: Official website

Carcastillo is a town and municipality located in the province and autonomous community of Navarre, in the north of Spain. It is located 70 km from its capital, Pamplona. Until the middle of the 19th century it belonged to the abbey of Santa María de la Oliva. This site is a Cistercian monastery 2 km from Carcastillo. The town is on the banks of the river Aragón to the north of the Bardenas Reales.

Within the municipal area there is also Figarol, a town located 7 km from Carcastillo, on the border with Aragón.
