= Fustiñana =

Town and municipality in northern Spain

Coordinates: 42°01′N 1°29′W

Fustiñana is a town and municipality located in the province and autonomous community of Navarre, northern Spain.

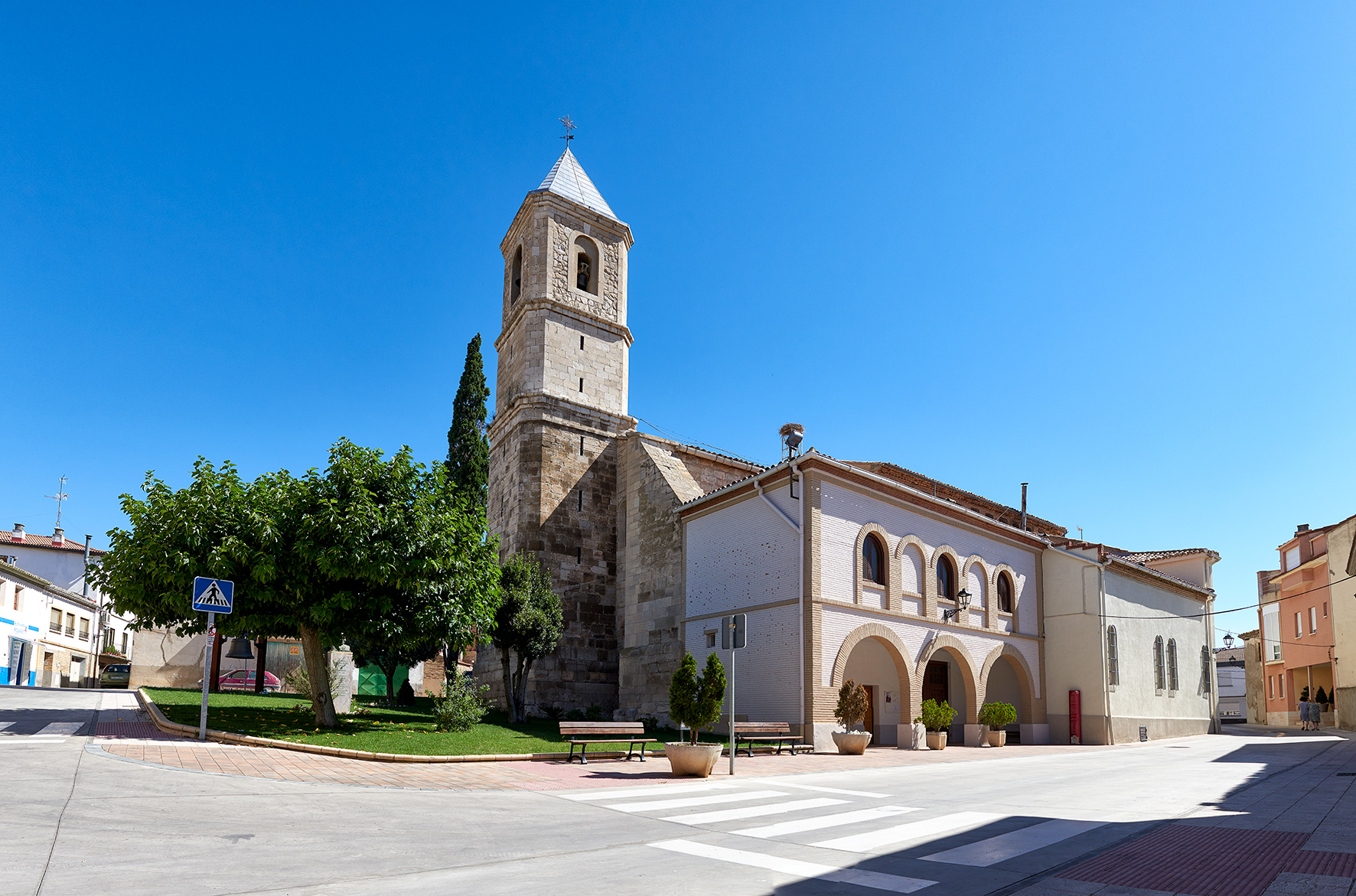
The Local Parish Church: Nuestra Señora de la Asunción

== Symbols ==
=== Coat of arms ===
Fustiñana's coat of arms is silver with the cross of San Juan of Jerusalem in gold. This coat of arms appears on the municipal flag, alongside Navarre's coat of arms.

== Monuments ==
Fustiaña's most prominent monuments are two churches, the parish dedicated to Nuestra Señora de la Asunción in the town itself, and the Ermita de Santa Lucía, located at the foot of the Bardenas Reales.
