= Figarol =

- Commune
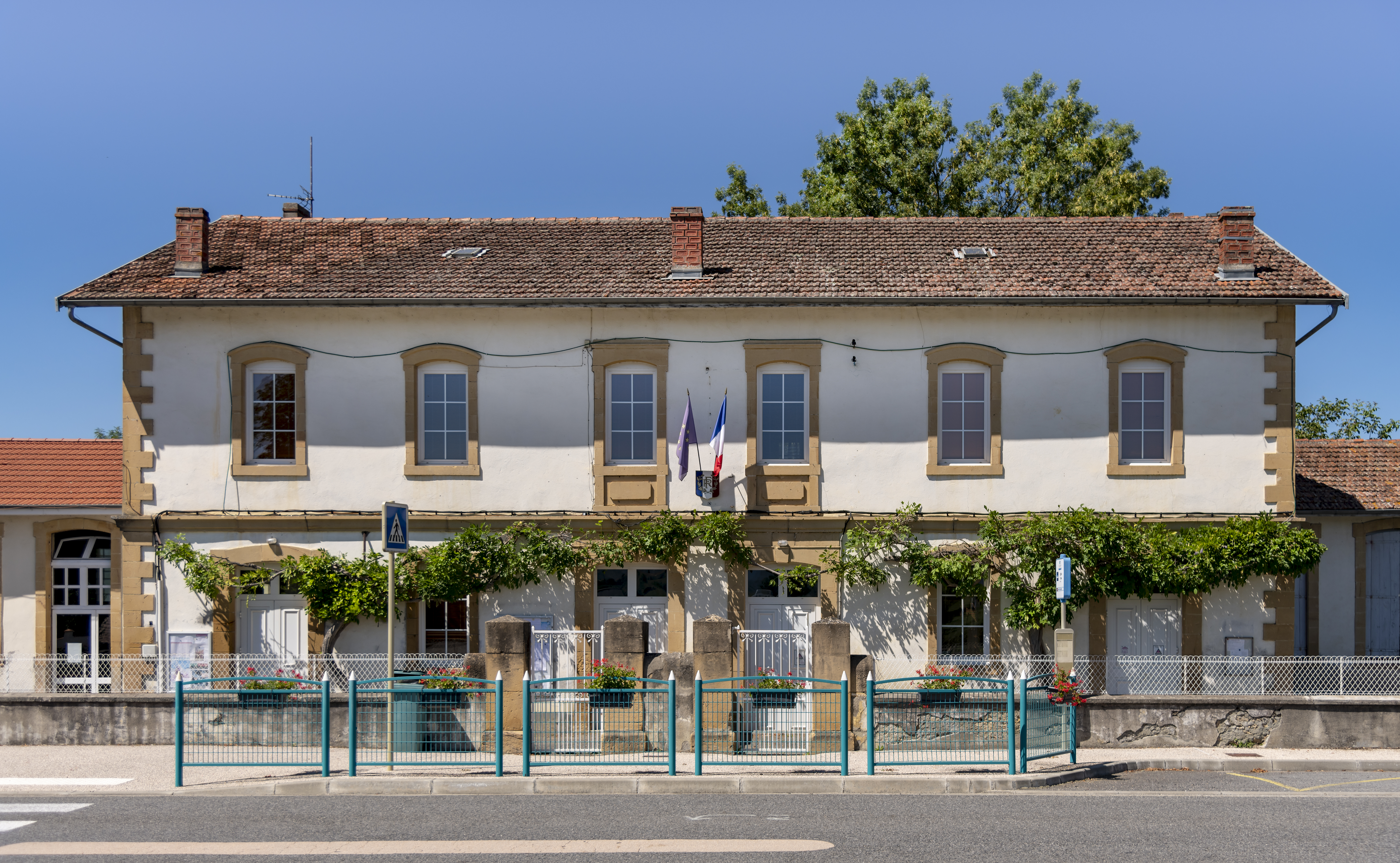
- The town hall in Figarol
- Location of Figarol
- Location within France Location within Occitanie
- Coordinates: 43°05′10″N 0°53′55″E
- Country: France
- Region: Occitania
- Department: Haute-Garonne
- Arrondissement: Saint-Gaudens
- Canton: Bagnères-de-Luchon
- Intercommunality: Cagire Garonne Salat

Government
  - Mayor (2020–2026): Jean-Charles Rosello
- Area^{1}: 11.6 km^{2} (4.5 sq mi)
- Elevation: 430 m (1,410 ft)
- Highest elevation: 425 m (1,394 ft)
- Lowest elevation: 295 m (968 ft)
- Population (2023): 311
  - Density: 26.8/km^{2} (69.4/sq mi)
- Time zone: UTC+01:00 (CET)
  - Summer (DST): UTC+02:00 (CEST)
- INSEE/Postal code: 31183 /31260
- ^{1} French Land Register data, which excludes lakes, ponds, glaciers > 1 km^{2} (0.386 sq mi or 247 acres) and river estuaries.

Figarol (French pronunciation: [fiɡaʁɔl]; Occitan: Higaròu) is a commune in the Haute-Garonne department in southwestern France.

== Population ==
Historical population
Year	Pop.	±% p.a.
1968	232	—
1975	212	−1.28%
1982	188	−1.70%
1990	195	+0.46%
1999	236	+2.14%
2007	278	+2.07%
2012	280	+0.14%
2017	305	+1.73%
2023	311	+0.33%
Source: INSEE

== See also ==
- Communes of the Haute-Garonne department
