= Semblanzas de reyes =

14th-century collection of biographies

The last Visigothic king, Roderic (left), with his crown falling off and his victorious opponent, the turbaned Ṭāriq ibn Ziyād (right), holding a partially sheathed sword

The Semblanzas de reyes (lit. 'Likenesses of Kings'), known in full as the Compendio de crónicas de los reyes del Antiguo Testamento, gentiles, cónsules y emperadores romanos, reyes godos y de los reinos de Castilla, Aragón, Navarra y Portugal, is an illuminated Old Castilian collection of biographies of rulers compiled around 1315/1320 for King Alfonso XI. It survives in a single late copy, probably from the 1470s, now manuscript 7415 in the Biblioteca Nacional de España.

The Semblanzas consists of a prologue followed by 172 short biographies of, in order: the kings of Israel and Judah, the kings of the gentile nations (Assyria, Babylonia, Egypt), Alexander the Great, Roman consuls and Roman emperors, Muḥammad, the kings of the Visigoths, Ṭāriq ibn Ziyād and the rulers of the Iberian realms (Asturias, León, Castile, Navarre, Aragon, Portugal). The biographical sketches vary in length between five and twenty-nine lines. The dating of the work is based on the image of Alfonso XI, which depicts a child. The work was almost certainly produced on the orders of Queen María de Molina, the young king's regent and grandmother.

The manuscript is made of parchment and consists of 44 folios. Each page has two biographies in parallel columns beneath an image of both rulers. The text is written in Gothic cursiva textualis, with the only decorated initials being at the start of the prologue and the first biography. Beneath the first biographies there is an unidentified coat of arms—probably indicating that the original owner of the manuscript was from the Lordship of Biscay. The iconography of the manuscript is stereotyped and repetitive. The drawing is rough but colourful with ample use of gold. All the kings are depicted enthroned in a niche with Gothic characteristics. Most have long hair and beards. They all carry either a sceptre or a sword and either an orb or a book. The greatest variation is found in the headdresses. The counts of Castile and counts of Portugal, for example, do not wear crowns. There is other variation in the details. The swords vary between sheathed and unsheathed, and the design of the sceptres and orbs varies.

Despite the stereotyping, some individual rulers are provided with distinguishing details. Alfonso XI and Henry I of Castile are portrayed as children. Sancho the Fat is portrayed as fat. Pious rulers have a halo and a globus cruciger. Legislators are shown holding a book. The most distinctive rulers are Muḥammad and Ṭāriq, who are both depicted in eastern dress. Muḥammad is depicted, not as a military leader, but as a preacher. He points with his left hand to the Koran in his right. He appears beside Athanaric, the first king of the Visigoths, just as Ṭāriq, the Muslim conqueror of the Visigoths, appears beside the last Visigothic king, Roderic.

== Bibliography ==
- Bernabé-Pons, Luis F. (2022). "Visual (Mis)Representations of Islam and the Prophet Muhammad". IKON: Journal of Iconographic Studies. 15: 115–128.
- González Muñoz, Luis Fernando (2018). "Consideraciones sobre las representaciones gráficas del profeta Muḥammad en manuscritos cristianos occidentales: Siglos XII–XVI" (PDF). De Medio Aevo. 12: 47–68.
- Nickson, Tom (2015). Toledo Cathedral: Building Histories in Medieval Castile. Penn State University Press.
- Nogales Rincón, David (2006). "Las series iconográficas de la realeza castellano-leonesa (siglos XII–XV)". En la España medieval (Extra 1): 81–112.
- Rodríguez Porto, Rosa María (2006). "María de Molina y la educación de Alfonso XI: las Semblanzas de reyes del ms. 7415 de la Biblioteca Nacional". Quintana (5): 219–231.
- Rodríguez Porto, Rosa María (2016). "La Crónica Geral de Espanha de 1344 (ms. 1 A de la Academia das Ciências) y la tradición alfonsí". e-Spania. 25.
