= Mélida =

Town and municipality of Navarre, Spain

Coordinates: 42.360°N 1.545°W

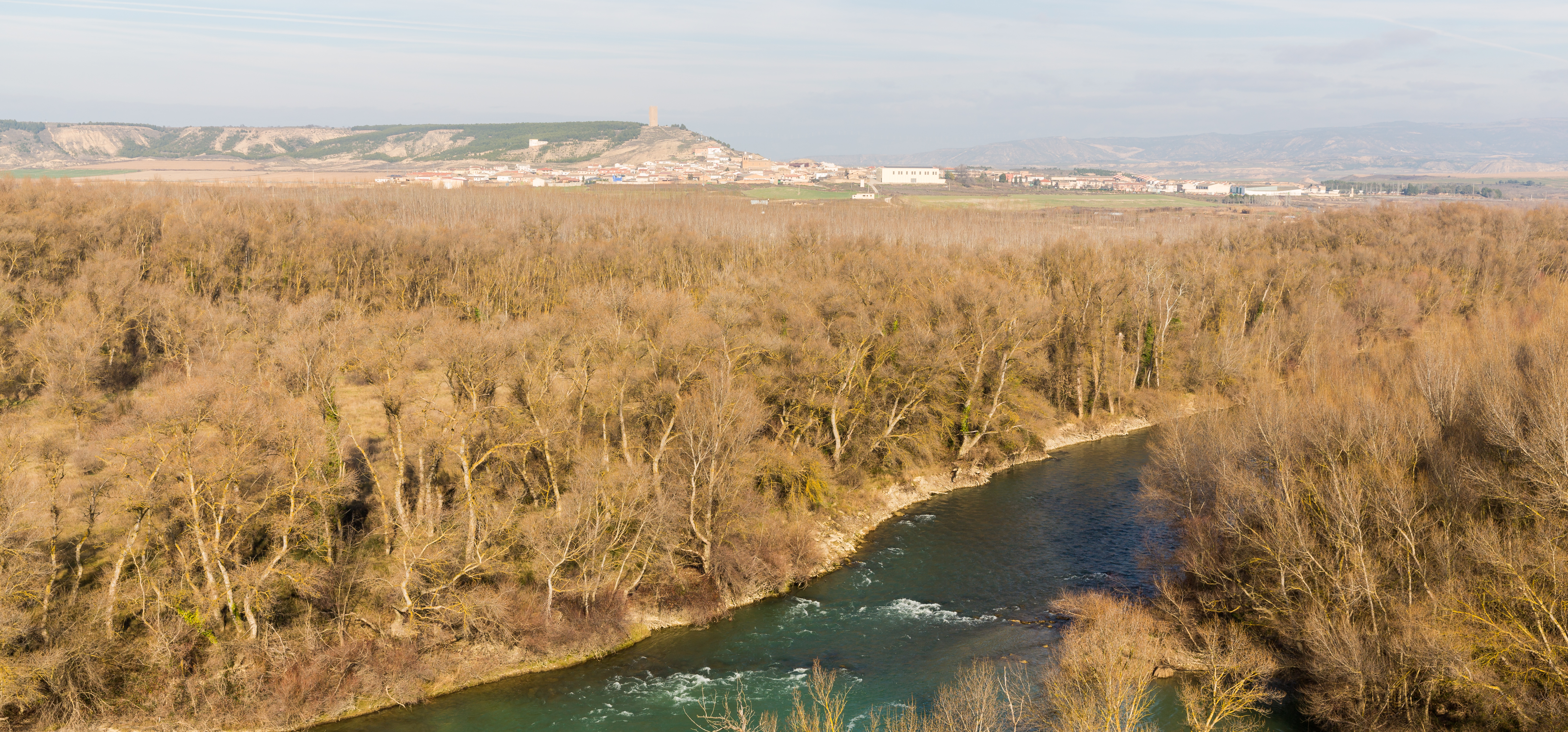
Outlook of Mélida.

Mélida is a town and municipality located in the province and autonomous community of Navarre, northern Spain.
