= Buñuel =

Town and municipality of Spain

Coordinates: 41°58′53″N 1°26′27″W

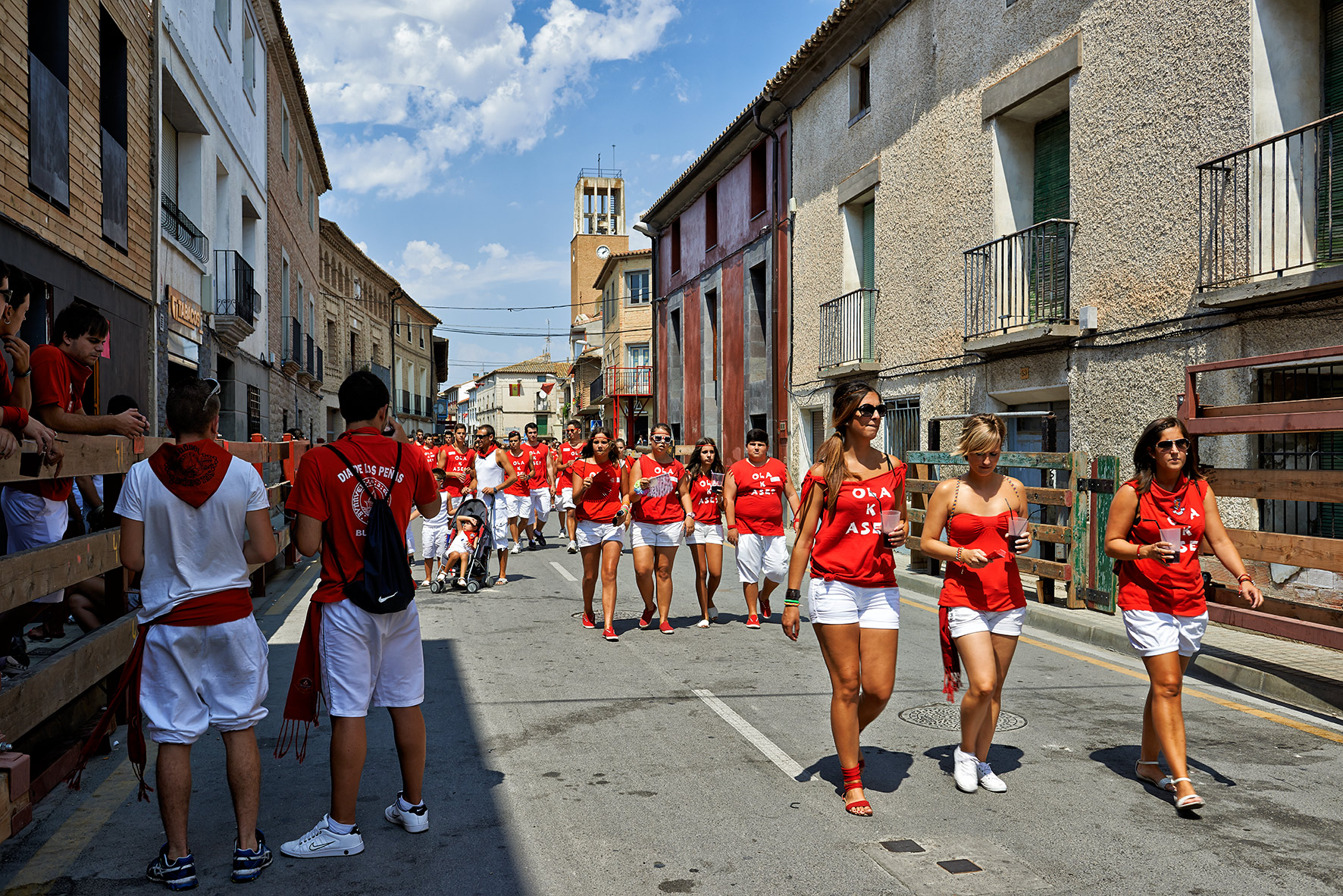
A festival in Buñuel in 2013

Buñuel's coat of arms

Buñuel is a town and municipality located in the province and autonomous community of Navarre, northern Spain.
