= Caparroso =

Municipality of Spain

Coordinates: 42°20′N 1°40′W

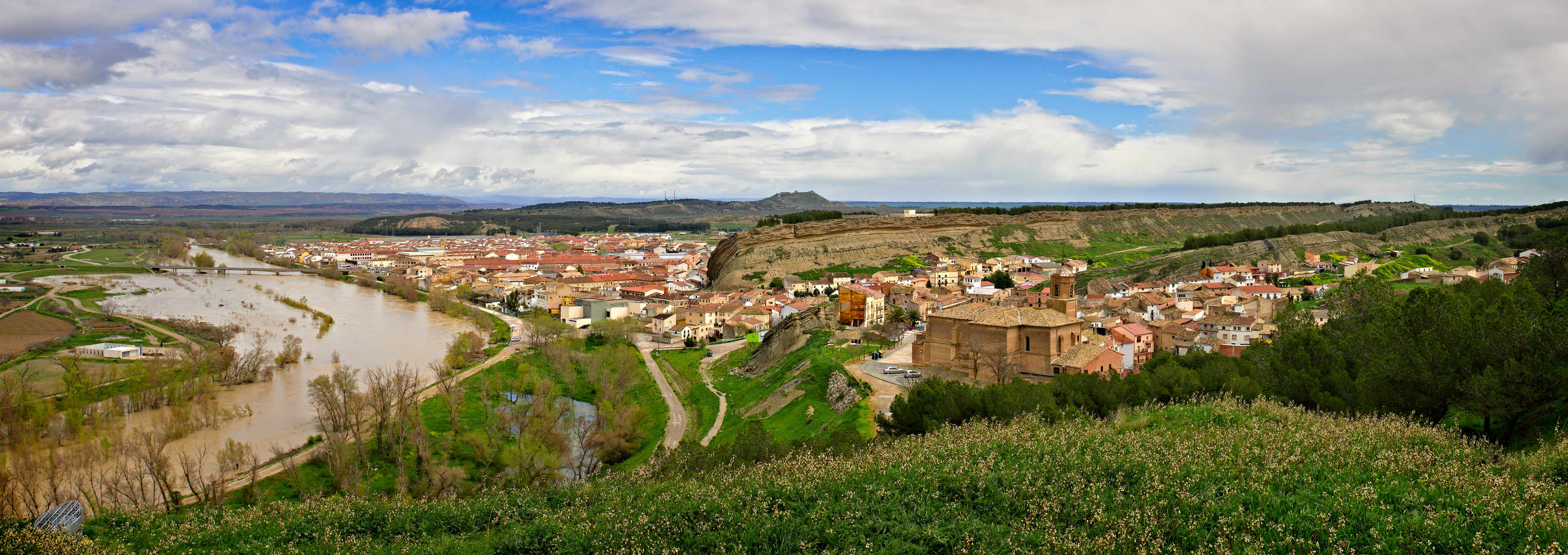
Caparroso General Landscape

Caparroso's flag

Caparroso's coat of arms

Caparroso is a town and municipality located in the province and autonomous community of Navarre, in the north of Spain.
