= Arguedas, Navarre =

Town in northern Spain

Coordinates: 42°10′37″N 1°35′54″W

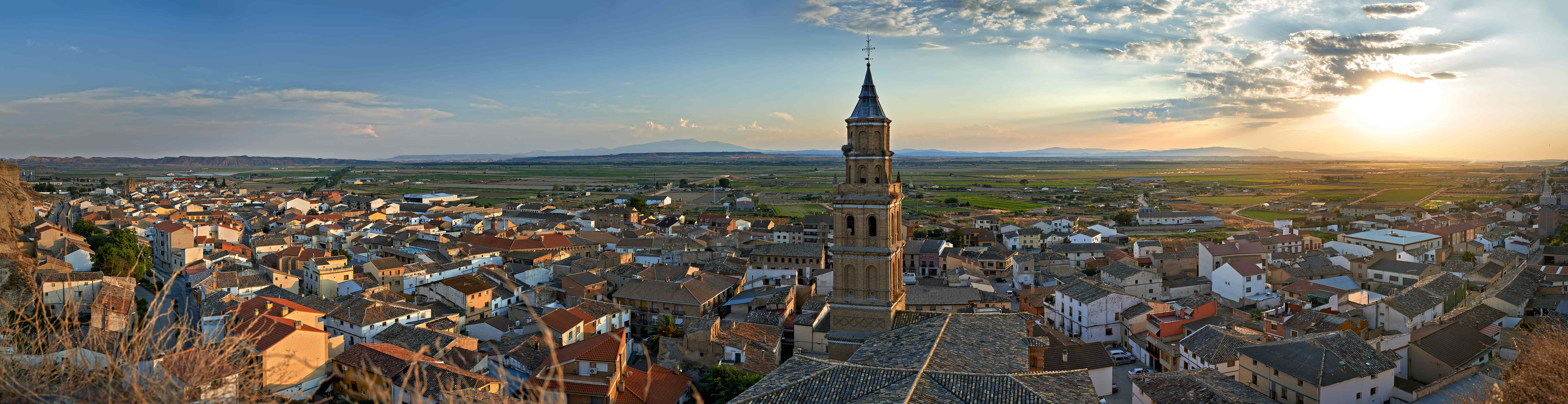

Arguedas's coat of arms

Arguedas is a town and municipality located in the province and autonomous community of Navarre, northern Spain. In 2015, 2,309 people lived there.

Arguedas is the birthplace of the artist Antonio Loperena.
