= Santacara =

Coordinates: 42°22′N 1°38′W

- Santacara, Navarre
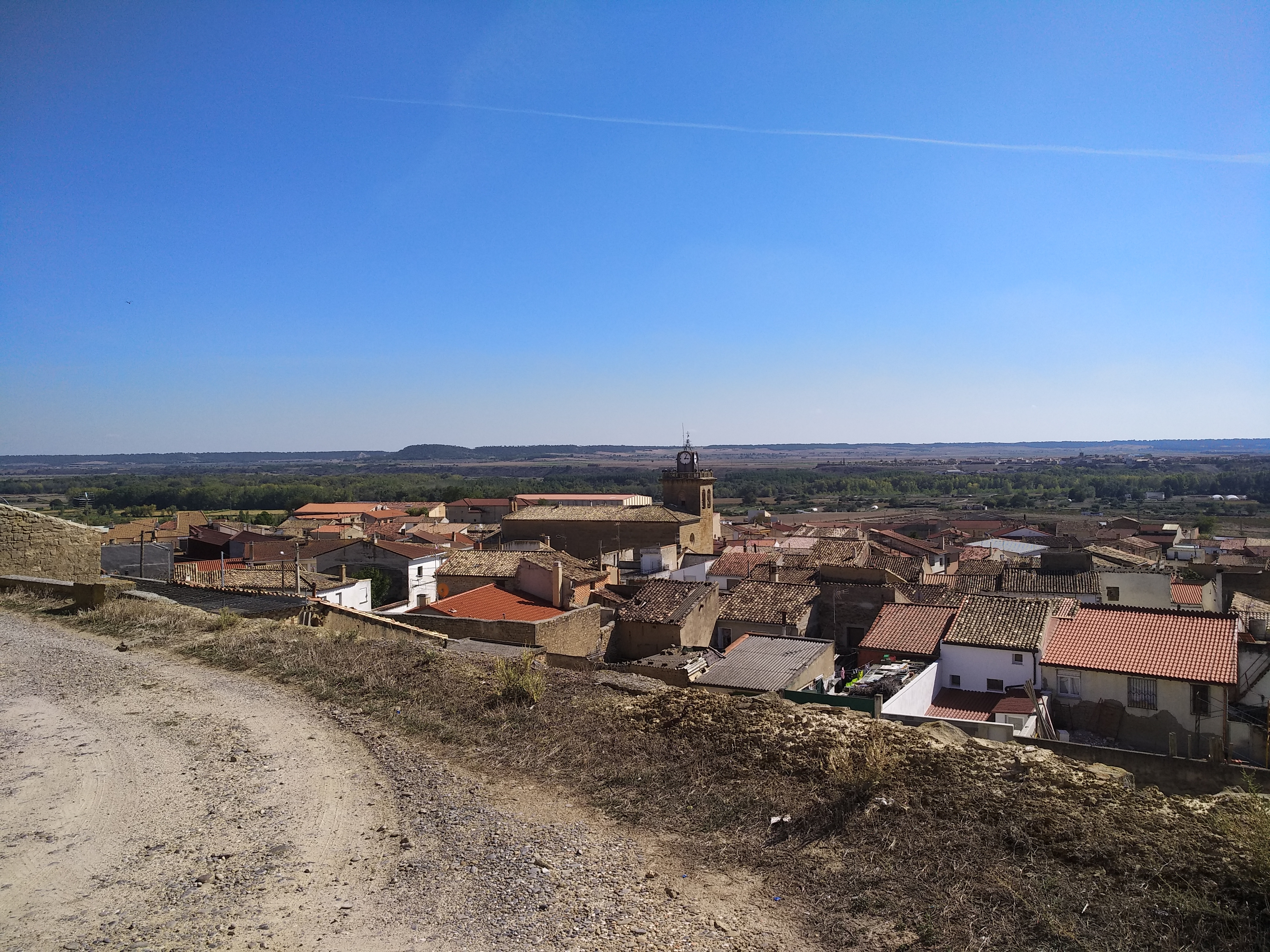
- View from the climb to the Santacara castle

- Coat of arms

- Map of Santacara

Santacara is a town and municipality in the province and autonomous community of Navarre, northern Spain.
