= Cabanillas =

Town and municipality in Navarre, Spain

Coordinates: 42°01′53″N 1°31′37″W

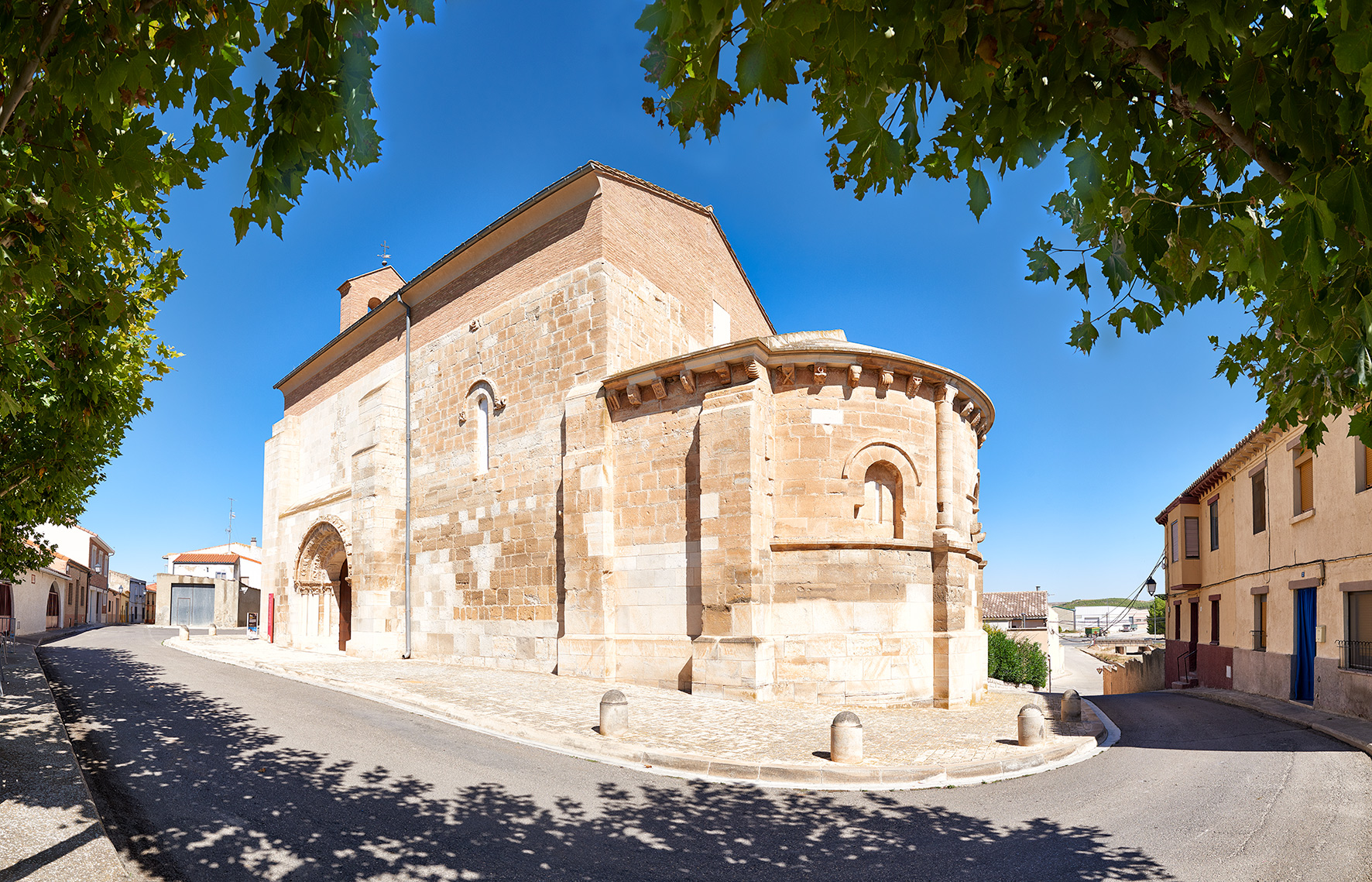
Church of San Juan de Jerusalem de Cabanillas (Navarra)

Cabanillas's coat of arms

Cabanillas (very exceptionally in Basque: Kapanaga) is a town and municipality located in the province and autonomous community of Navarre, northern Spain.
