= Cadreita =

Town and municipality in Navarre, Spain

Coordinates: 42°13′N 1°41′W

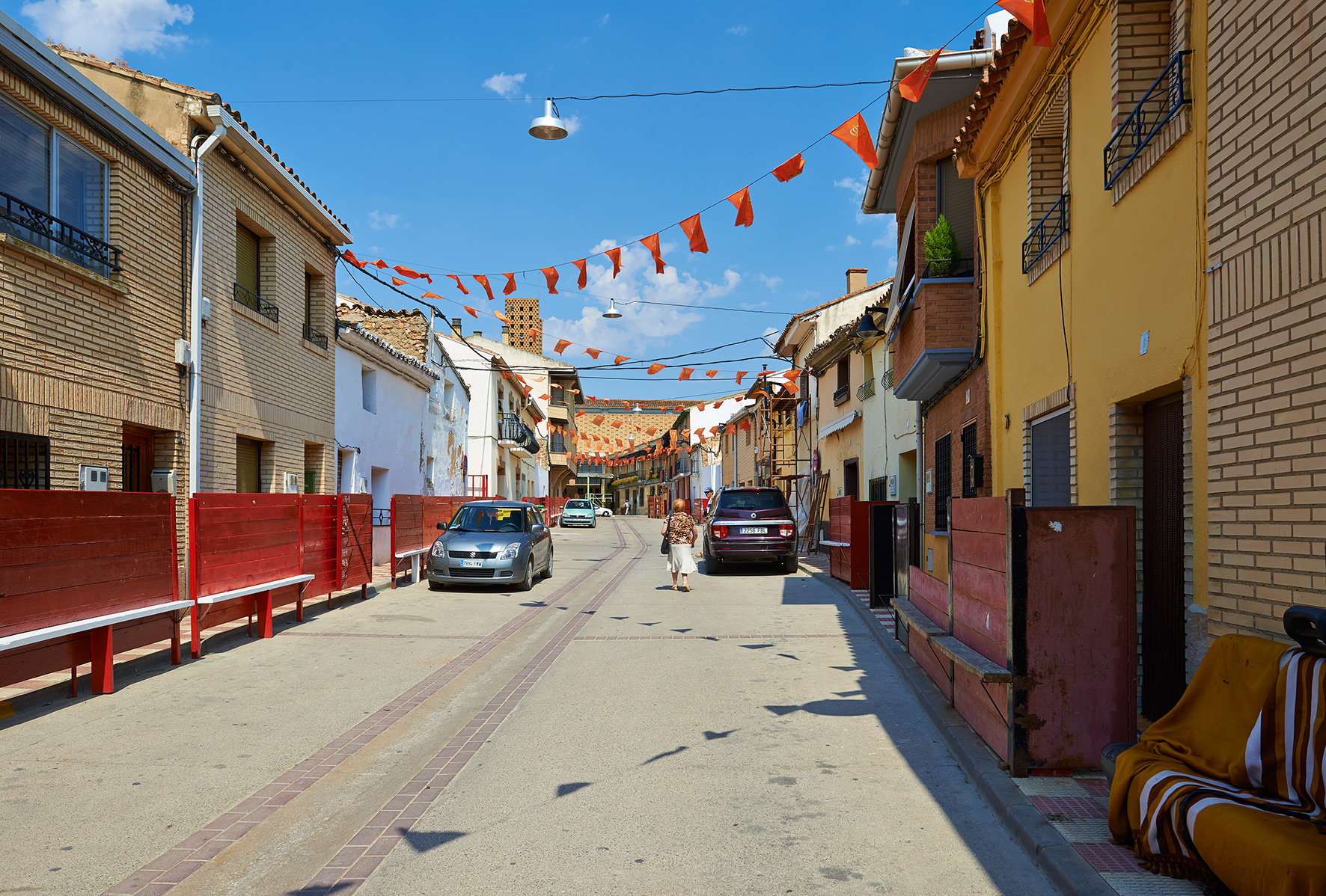
Cadreita street (Navarra, Spain)

Cadreita's flag

Cadreita's coat of arms

Cadreita is a town and municipality located in the province and autonomous community of Navarre, northern Spain.
