= Pedro de Atarés =

Spanish noble

- Lord of Atarés, Aibar, Javierrelatre and Borja
- Born: c. 1083
- Died: 21 February 1151; Borja
- Buried: Veruela Abbey
- Noble family: Jiménez dynasty
- Father: García Sánchez
- Mother: Teresa Cajal

Pedro de Atarés (c. 1083 in Borja – 21 February 1151) was a Spanish noble and member of the House of Aragón. He founded the Veruela Abbey, the oldest Cistercian monastery in Aragon.

== Biography ==
=== Family ===
Pedro de Atarés was the son of García Sánchez, Lord of Aibar, Atarés, and Javierrelatre, and grandson of Sancho Ramírez, Count of Ribagorza, (Note: In a donation made by Garcia to Galindo Garcés de Artosella consisting of some houses in Huesca and other properties, he states at the beginning: Ego Garcia infans, filius Sancii Ranimiri comitis (I Garcia, infante, son of count Sancho Ramírez), and in the last part of the document, he confirms as, ego Garcia infans in Atares et in Exabierre.) an illegitimate child of King Ramiro I. His mother was Teresa Cajal, a sister of Fortún Garcés Cajal, one of the most powerful magnates in the Kingdom of Aragón.

=== Pretender to the throne ===
Pedro inherited the lordships of Atarés and Javierrelatre from his father, and received Borja by gift of King Alfonso VII of Castile, He was one of the claimants to the throne of Aragón after the childless death of King Alfonso I the Battler. According to the Crónica de San Juan de la Peña, written in the 14th century, he had been the preferred candidate of the Aranonese barons but he then alienated them with his haughty behavior at the assembly, and they instead chose the deceased king's brother Ramiro II, until then a monk.

=== Founder of Veruela Abbey ===
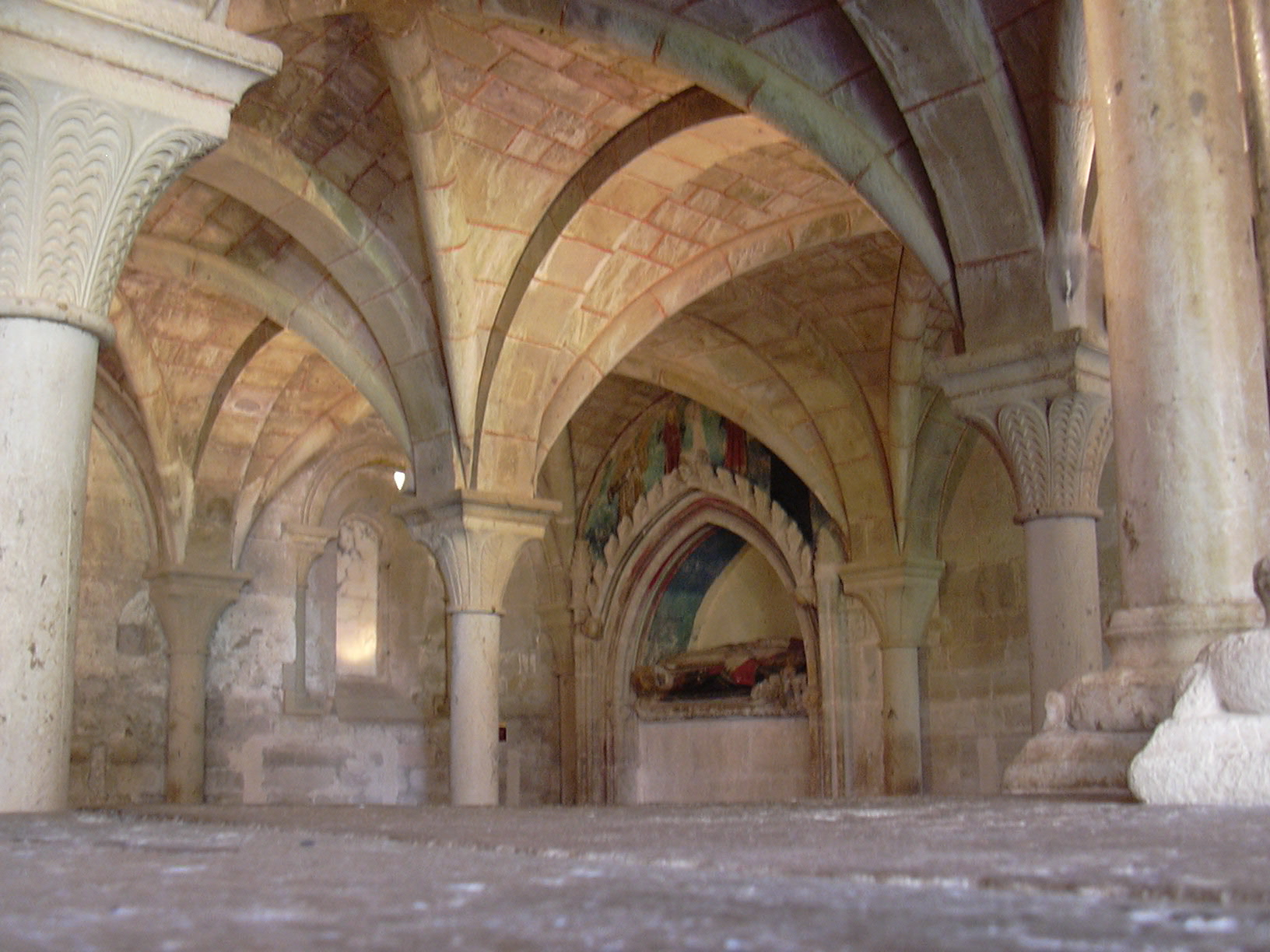
Veruela Abbey

In 1146, (Note: Laurent Dailliez affirms that the date is incorrect and that the monastery was founded in 1145.) Pedro de Atarés founded Veruela Abbey (Real Monasterio de Santa María de Veruela), the most ancient Cistercian monastery in Aragon, with a donation, also confirmed by his mother, to the abbot of the Escaladieu Abbey in France. (Note: Ego Petrus Taresa cum matre mea facio hanc cartam donationis et confirmationis vobis, abbati Scalae Dei (I, Pedro Teresa with my mother make this donation and confirmation letter to you, abbot of Scala Dei). He appears with this name in other documents.) This donation was later confirmed in 1155 by Count Raymond Berenguer IV.

=== Death without issue ===
Pedro de Atarés died on 21 February 1151 and was buried at the abbey which he had founded. Although he died without leaving any children, members of the House of Borgia invented a genealogy tracing their origins back to this member of the royal house coinciding with the third wedding of Lucrezia Borgia to Alfonso I d'Este, Duke of Ferrara, which was arranged by her father Pope Alexander VI. Nevertheless:

The legend spread by the family that the Borgia were descendants of this gentleman of royal blood, Don Pedro de Atarés (...), lord of Borja which entitled them to use the double crown of Aragón in their coat of arms, is false. The truth is quite different. Don Pedro de Atarés died in 1151 and there is no doubt that he left no descendants.

=== Family tree ===
Family tree showing claimants in 1134

Muniadona of Castile	Sancho III of Pamplona	Sancha of Aybar
Stephanie of Barcelona	García; Sánchez III of Pamplona	(mistress)	Ferdinand I of León	Garsendis of Foix	Ramiro I of Aragon	Amuña
Sancho IV of Navarre	Sancho; Garcés of Uncastillo	Alfonso VI of León and Castile	Felicia of Roucy	Sancho; Ramírez of Navarre and Aragon	Isabella of Urgell	Sancho; Ramírez; Count of Ribagorza
Ramiro; Sánchez of Monzón	Urraca of León and Castile	Alfonso the Battler died 1134	Ramiro II of Aragon	Peter I of Navarre and Aragon	García; Sánchez of Atarés
García; Ramírez of Navarre	Alfonso VII of León and Castile	Petronilla of Aragon	Ramon; Berenguer IV; Count of Barcelona	Peter of Atarés

Candidates for the crowns of Navarre and Aragon in 1134
Marriage and legitimate descent
Liaison and illegitimate descent

== Bibliography ==
- Alonso Álvarez, Raquel (2007). "Los promotores de la Orden del Císter en los Reinos de Castilla y León: Familias aristocráticas y damas nobles". Anuario de Estudios Medievales (in Spanish). 37 (37/2). Barcelona: Universidad de Barcelona. Instituto de Historia Medieval de España: 653–710. doi:10.3989/aem.2007.v37.i2.50. hdl:10651/21710. ISSN 0066-5061.
- Batllori, Miguel (1999). La familia de los Borja (in Spanish). Madrid: Real Academia de la Historia. ISBN 84-7820-823-2.
- Cabanes Pecourt, Mª de los Desamparados (1995). "Datas históricas de la documentación de Veruela del siglo XII" (PDF). Aragón en la Edad Media (in Spanish) (12): 13–28. ISSN 0213-2486.
- Díaz Barón, Mª Gloria (1992). "Las relaciones del Monasterio de Veruela y Bulbuente: el cumplimiento de la carta de población de Villamayor" (PDF). Turiaso (in Spanish) (10/1). Zaragoza: Institución Fernando el Católico: Centro de Estudios Turiasonenses: 163–180. ISSN 0211-7207. Archived from the original (PDF) on 2017-03-16.
- Lacarra, José María (1982). Documentos para el estudio de la reconquista y repoblación del Valle del Ebro (in Spanish). Vol. I. Zaragoza: Anubar Ediciones. ISBN 84-7013-192-3.
- Lapeña Paul, Ana Isabel (2004). Sancho Ramírez, rey de Aragón (¿1064?-1094) y rey de Navarra (1076–1094) (in Spanish). Gijón: Ediciones Trea. ISBN 84-9704-123-2.
- Mathew, Arnold H. (1912). The Life and Times of Rodrigo Borgia, Pope Alexander VI. New York: Brentano's. ISBN 84-9704-123-2.
- Melero Moneo, Mª Luisa (2004). "Reflexiones sobre el monasterio cisterciense de Santa María de Fitero" (PDF). De arte: Revista de historia del arte (in Spanish) (3). León: Universidad (León) Facultad de Filosofía y Letras: 7–22. ISSN 1696-0319.
- Nadal Cañellas, Juan (2006). "La permanencia de Rodrigo de Borja (Alejandro VI) en el estudio de Bolonia, según documentos originales". Acta Histórica et Archaeologica Mediaevalia (in Spanish) (27–28). Barcelona: Universidad de Barcelona. Departamento de Historia Medieval: 173–205. ISSN 0212-2960.
- Nelson, Lynn H. (1991). The Chronicle of San Juan de la Peña. A Fourteenth-Century Official History of the Crown of Aragon. Translated, with an Introduction and Notes by Lynn H. Nelson. Philadelphia: University of Pennsylvania Press. ISBN 0812213521.
- Orcástegui Gros, Carmen (1985). "Crónica de San Juan de la Peña (versión aragonesa): Edición crítica" (PDF). Cuadernos de historia Jerónimo Zurita (in Spanish) (51–52). Zaragoza: Institución Fernando el Católico: 419–569. ISSN 0044-5517.
