= List of Aragonese monarchs =

Rulers of the Kingdom and the Crown of Aragon

Coat of Arms of the rulers of the Crown of Aragon

This is a list of the kings and queens of Aragon. The Kingdom of Aragon was created sometime between 950 and 1035 when the County of Aragon, which had been acquired by the Kingdom of Navarre in the tenth century, was separated from Navarre in accordance with the will of King Sancho III (1004–35). In 1137, the marriage of Petronila, Princess of Aragon, and the Catalan count Ramon Berenguer IV, Count of Barcelona, created a dynastic union from which what modern historians call the Crown of Aragon was born. Apart from the Kingdom of Aragon and the County of Barcelona, later the Principality of Catalonia, in the thirteenth century the kingdoms of Valencia, Majorca and Sicily were added to the Crown, and in the fourteenth the Kingdom of Sardinia and Corsica. The Crown of Aragon continued to exist until 1707-1715 when its separate constitutional systems (Fueros of Aragon, Constitutions of Catalonia, and Furs of Valencia) were abolished by the Nueva Planta decrees at the end of the War of the Spanish Succession.

== Jiménez dynasty, 1035–1164 ==
With the death of Sancho III of Pamplona, Aragon was inherited by his son Ramiro as an autonomous state.

Name	Birth	Marriages	Death
Ramiro I February 1035 – 8 May 1063	1007 son of Sancho III of Pamplona and Sancha de Aybar	Ermesinda of Bigorre; 22 August 1036; 5 children	8 May 1063; Graus
Sancho Ramírez (also King of Pamplona from 1076); 8 May 1063 – 4 June 1094	1042 son of Ramiro I of Aragon and Ermesinda of Bigorre	Isabella of Urgell; 1065; 1 child Felicia of Roucy; 1076; 3 children	4 June 1094; Huesca aged 48
Peter I (also King of Pamplona); 4 June 1094 – 28 September 1104	1068 son of Sancho Ramírez and Isabella of Urgell	Agnes of Aquitaine, Queen of Aragon and Navarre; 1086; 2 children Bertha of Aragon; 1097; No children	28 September 1104; Aran Valley aged 36
Alfonso I (also King of Pamplona); 28 September 1104 – 8 September 1134	1073 son of Sancho Ramírez, King of Aragón and Navarre and Felicia of Roucy	Urraca of León; 1109; No children	8 September 1134; Huesca aged 61
Ramiro II the Monk; 8 September 1134 – 13 November 1137	24 April 1086 son of Sancho Ramírez, King of Aragón and Navarre and Felicia of Roucy	Agnes of Aquitaine; 1 child	16 August 1157; Huesca aged 71
Petronilla; 13 November 1137 – 18 July 1164	29 July 1136; Huesca daughter of Ramiro II of Aragon and Agnes of Aquitaine	Ramon Berenguer IV of Barcelona; 11 August 1137; 5 children	16 October 1174; Barcelona aged 38

== House of Barcelona, 1164–1410 ==
Name	Portrait	Birth	Marriage(s)	Death
Alfonso II; 18 July 1164 – 25 April 1196	Aragon	March 1157; Huesca son of Ramon Berenguer IV of Barcelona and Petronilla of Aragon	Sancha of Castile; 7 children	25 April 1196; Perpignan aged 44
Peter II; 25 April 1196 – 13 September 1213	Aragon	1178; Huesca son of Alfonso II and Sancha of Castile	Maria of Montpellier; 15 June 1204; 2 children	12 September 1213; Battle of Muret aged approximately 35
James I 13 September 1213 – 27 July 1276	James I	2 February 1208; Montpellier son of Peter II and Maria of Montpellier	Eleanor of Castile; 1221; 1 child Violant of Hungary; 1235; 10 children Teresa Gil de Vidaure; 2 children	27 July 1276; Valencia aged 68
Peter III; 27 July 1276 – 2 November 1285	Peter III	1240; Valencia son of James I and Violant of Hungary	Constance of Sicily; 13 June 1262; 6 children	2 November 1285; Vilafranca del Penedès aged 45
Alfonso III; 2 November 1285 – 18 June 1291	Alfonso III	1265; Valencia son of Peter III and Constance of Sicily	Eleanor of England; 15 August 1290; No children	18 June 1291; Barcelona aged 27
James II; 18 June 1291 – 2 November 1327	James II	10 August 1267; Valencia son of Peter III and Constance of Sicily	Isabella of Castile; 1 December 1291; No children Blanche of Anjou; 29 October 1295; 10 children Marie de Lusignan; 15 June 1315; No children Elisenda de Montcada; 25 December 1322; No children	5 November 1327; Barcelona aged 60
Alfonso IV; 2 November 1327 – 24 January 1336	Alfonso IV	1299; Naples son of James II and Blanche of Anjou	Teresa d'Entença; 1314; 7 children Eleanor of Castile; 2 children	27 January 1336; Barcelona aged 37
Peter IV; 24 January 1336 – 5 January 1387	Peter IV	5 October 1319; Balaguer son of Alfonso IV and Teresa d'Entença	Maria of Navarre; 1338; 2 children Eleanor of Portugal; 1347; No children Eleanor of Sicily; 4 children	5 January 1387; Barcelona aged 68
John I 5 January 1387 – 19 May 1396	John I	27 December 1350; Perpignan son of Peter IV and Eleanor of Sicily	Martha of Armagnac; 1 child Yolande of Bar; 3 children	19 May 1396; Foixà aged 46
Martin; 19 May 1396 – 31 May 1410	Martin I	1356; Girona son of Peter IV and Eleanor of Sicily	Maria de Luna; 13 June 1372; 4 children Margaret of Prades; 1409; No children	31 May 1410; Barcelona aged 54

== House of Trastámara, 1412–1555 ==
Name	Portrait	Birth	Marriage(s)	Death
Ferdinand I the Honest; 24 June 1412 – 2 April 1416	Ferdinand I	27 November 1380; Medina del Campo son of John I of Castile and Eleanor of Aragon	Eleanor of Alburquerque; 1394; 8 children	2 April 1416; Igualada aged 36
Alfonso V the Magnanimous; 2 April 1416 – 27 June 1458	Alfonso V	1396; Medina del Campo son of Ferdinand I and Eleanor of Alburquerque	Maria of Castile; 1415; No children	27 June 1458; Naples aged 52
John II the Great; 27 June 1458 – 19 January 1479	John II	29 June 1398; Medina del Campo son of Ferdinand I and Eleanor of Alburquerque	Blanche I of Navarre; 6 November 1419; 4 children Juana Enríquez; 2 children	20 January 1479; Barcelona aged 81
Ferdinand II the Catholic; 19 January 1479 – 23 January 1516	Ferdinand II	10 March 1452 son of John II and Juana Enríquez	Isabella I of Castile; 19 October 1469; 5 children Germaine of Foix; 1505; No children	23 January 1516; Madrigalejo aged 63
Joanna of Castile; 23 January 1516 – 12 April 1555	Joanna	6 November 1479 daughter of Ferdinand II and Isabella I	Philip of Austria; 20 October 1496; 6 children	12 April 1555; Tordesillas aged 75

Nominally co-monarch of her son Charles I, Joanna I was confined for alleged insanity during her whole reign.

=== Claimants against John II, 1462–1472 ===
During the Catalan Civil War, there were three who claimed his throne, though this never included the Kingdom of Valencia.

Name	Portrait	Birth	Marriage(s)	Death
Henry IV of Castile (claimant); House of Trastámara; 1462–1463	Henry IV	5 January 1425; Valladolid son of John II of Castile and Maria of Aragon	Joan of Portugal; 1455; 1 child	11 December 1474; Madrid aged 49
Peter V of Aragon (claimant); House of Aviz; 1463–1466	Peter V	1429 son of Peter, Duke of Coimbra and Isabella of Urgell	never married	1466; Granollers aged 37
René (claimant); House of Valois-Anjou; 1466–1472	René	16 January 1409; Château d'Angers son of Louis II of Anjou and Yolande of Aragon	Isabella, Duchess of Lorraine; 1420; 10 children Jeanne de Laval; 10 September 1454; No children	10 July 1480; Aix-en-Provence aged 71

== House of Habsburg, 1516–1700 ==
Name	Portrait	Birth	Marriage(s)	Death
Charles I the Emperor; 23 January 1516 – 16 January 1556	Charles IV	24 February 1500; Ghent son of Philip I of Castile and Joanna of Castile	Isabella of Portugal; 10 March 1526; 3 children	21 September 1558; Yuste aged 58
Philip I the Prudent; 16 January 1556 – 13 September 1598	Philip I	21 May 1527; Valladolid son of Charles I and Isabella of Portugal	Maria of Portugal; 1543; 1 child Mary I of England; 1554; No children Elisabeth of Valois; 1559; 2 children Anna of Austria; 4 May 1570; 5 children	13 September 1598; Madrid aged 71
Philip II the Pious; 13 September 1598 – 31 March 1621	Philip II	14 April 1578; Madrid son of Philip I and Anna of Austria	Margaret of Austria; 18 April 1599; 5 children	31 March 1621; Madrid aged 42
Philip III the Great; 31 March 1621 – 17 September 1665	Philip III	8 April 1605; Valladolid son of Philip II and Margaret of Austria	Elisabeth of France; 1615; 7 children Mariana of Austria; 1649; 5 children	17 September 1665; Madrid aged 60
Charles II the Bewitched; 17 September 1665 – 1 November 1700	Charles II	6 November 1661; Madrid son of Philip III and Mariana of Austria	Marie Louise of Orléans; 19 November 1679; No children Maria Anna of Neuburg; 14 May 1690; No children	1 November 1700; Madrid aged 38

Aragon itself stayed loyal to Philip IV during the Reapers' War while Catalonia switched allegiance to Louis XIII and Louis XIV the Sun-King (see List of counts of Barcelona). Portugal seceded in 1640. Charles II died without heirs.

== War of the Spanish Succession ==
=== House of Bourbon, 1700–1705 ===
Name	Portrait	Birth	Marriage(s)	Death
Philip IV the Spirited; 1 November 1700 – 1705	Philip IV	19 December 1683; Versailles son of Louis, Grand Dauphin and Maria Anna Victoria of Bavaria	Maria Luisa Gabriella of Savoy; 2 November 1701; 4 children Elisabeth Farnese; 24 December 1714; 7 children	9 July 1746; Madrid aged 62

=== House of Habsburg, 1705–1707 ===
Austrian control of the Aragon between 1705 and 1707 determines the establishment of the Council of Aragon.

Name	Portrait	Birth	Marriage(s)	Death
Charles III the Archduke; 1705–1707	Charles VI	1 October 1685; Vienna son of Leopold I, Holy Roman Emperor and Eleonore Magdalene of Neuburg	Elisabeth Christine; 1 August 1708; 4 children	20 October 1740; Vienna aged 55

=== House of Bourbon, 1707–1707 ===
Name	Portrait	Birth	Marriage(s)	Death
Philip IV the Spirited; 1707–1707	Philip IV	19 December 1683; Versailles son of Louis, Grand Dauphin and Maria Anna Victoria of Bavaria	Maria Luisa Gabriella of Savoy; 2 November 1701; 4 children Elisabeth Farnese; 24 December 1714; 7 children	9 July 1746; Madrid aged 62

After the Battle of Almansa in April 1707, Philip V of Spain recovered the Aragon, but imposed the Nueva Planta decrees in June 1707, by which the territory lost its privileges.

During the war (officially in 1707) Philip V of Spain, the first of the Bourbon dynasty in Spain, disbanded the Crown of Aragon. After this time, there are no more Aragonese monarchs. Nevertheless, Spanish monarchs up to Isabella II, while styling themselves king/queen of Spain on coins, still used some of the traditional nomenclature of the defunct Crown of Aragon in their official documents: King/Queen of Castile, Leon, Aragon, both Sicilies, Jerusalem, Navarra, Granada, Toledo, Valencia, Galicia, Majorca, Sevilla, Sardinia, Cordova, Corsica, Murcia, Jaen, the Algarve, Algeciras, Gibraltar, the Canary Islands, the Eastern & Western Indias, the Islands & Mainland of the Ocean sea; Archduke of Austria; Duke of Burgundy, Brabant, Milan; Count of Habsburg, Flanders, Tyrol, Barcelona; Lord of Biscay, Molina.

== See also ==
- List of Asturian monarchs
- List of Castilian monarchs
- List of Galician monarchs
- List of Leonese monarchs
- List of Navarrese monarchs
- List of Majorcan monarchs
- List of Valencian monarchs
- List of Spanish monarchs
- Counts of Barcelona
- Kings of Spain family tree
