= Sancha of Aragon (died 1097) =

Aragonese princess

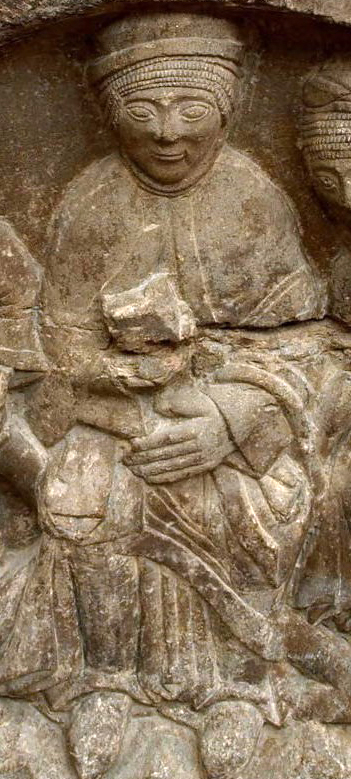
A detail from Sancha's sarcophagus, possibly a representation of her

Sancha Ramírez (born c. 1045, died 1097) was an Aragonese princess, the daughter of King Ramiro I and Queen Ermesinda. She was the countess of Urgell from c.1063 until 1065 as the wife of Count Ermengol III. Her brothers Sancho Ramírez and García Ramírez became king of Aragon and bishop of Pamplona, respectively. During her brother's reign she played an important role in consolidating the Kingdom of Aragon, which had been founded by her father in 1035.

== Marriage ==
Around 1063, when she was only about 18 years old, Sancha married the much older count of Urgell. She was his fourth wife and he had been count since 1038. He died after only a few years of marriage in 1065. As a twenty-year-old widow, Sancha remained for a while in Urgell, appearing in acts beside her stepson Count Ermengol IV. On 12 April 1065, she made a donation for the sake of her late husband's soul.

== Convent ==
When Sancha finally returned to Aragon she entered the convent Santa María of Santa Cruz de la Serós, the oldest house of nuns in Aragon, founded in 922. Her sister Urraca was already a nun there, having entered at their father's request in 1061. Her other sister, Theresa, later also entered the monastery, probably on her brother Sancho's orders because no suitable husband could be found for her. Sancha does not appear to have become a nun, but to have instead acted as administrator of the convent. She was a beneficiary of her brother's donations, and her estates formed almost an apanage (infantazgo) of the royal family. They would form the nucleus of the monastery's later territory.

On 27 October 1070 in the atrium of the abbey of Santa Cruz, before the abbess and the nuns, Sancha de Aibar, the mother of King Ramiro, gave to her granddaughter and namesake, Countess Sancha, the monastery of Santa Cecilia de Aibar with its appurtenances and revenues, the Villa Miranda in the Cinco Villas and the estate of San Pelayo de Atés. The elder Sancha had received the estate at Aibar with the monastery from Queen Jimena Fernández, the grandmother of Ramiro. From Ramiro her son she received Miranda and San Pelayo after he became king. After her gift to her granddaughter she entered the convent of Santa Cruz. The younger Sancha was to enjoy the profits of her acquisitions until her own death, when they would pass to Santa Cruz. This donation and its stipulations is evidence that Sancha, although quite young, had no intention of remarrying as of 1070.

In 1078, Sancha, acting on behalf of Santa Cruz, exchanged some land with the monastery of Leire. In 1079, she made a similar exchange of properties with San Juan de la Peña, this time accompanied by the abbess of Santa Cruz, Mindonia. She also administered the abbey of San Pedro de Siresa. In 1080, she witnessed the will of Count Sancho Galíndez.

== Policy ==
Sancha had the confidence of her brother. She judged cases along with the king and queen, and confirmed royal diplomas. In 1082, during a dispute between her brothers, the king gave the administration of the diocese of Pamplona and its revenues to Sancha. She managed it until the election of a new bishop, Pedro de Roda, in 1083. In her administration of both the abbey of Santa Cruz and the diocese of Pamplona, Sancha worked to further the Gregorian reforms. She was possibly the most important ally Pope Gregory VII had in the Iberian peninsula at the time.

Sancha was present on 4 December 1094 when the church of San Juan de la Peña was consecrated and the body of her brother Sancho was interred. On 17 December 1096, she and her nephew King Peter I confirmed the donation made by Pedro de Roda, newly made bishop of Huesca, to the monastery of Saint-Pons-de-Thomières after the conquest of the city of Huesca. On 5 April 1097, she confirmed her nephew's donation of the cathedral of Huesca to the church.

== Sources ==
- Aurell, Martin (1995). Les noces du comte: mariage et pouvoir en Catalogne (785–1213). Paris: Publications de la Sorbonne.
- Buesa Conde, Domingo J.; Simon, David L., eds. (1995). La condesa Doña Sancha y los orígenes de Aragón. Zaragoza: Ibercaja.
- Campo Betrán, María Gloria (1987). "El sarcófago de doña Sancha y la escultura románica del Altoaragón". Homenaje a Don Federico Balaguer Sánchez. Instituto de Estudios Altoaragoneses. pp. 257–78. ISBN 978-84-398-8972-4.
- Durán Gudiol, Antonio (1993). Ramiro I de Aragón. Zaragoza: Ibercaja.
- González Miranda, Marina (1956). "La condesa doña Sancha y el Monasterio de Santa Cruz de la Serós". Estudios de edad media de la Corona de Aragón. 6: 185–202.
- Laliena Corbera, Carlos (2014). "El el corazón del estado feudal política dinástica y memoria femenina en el siglo XI". In María del Carmen García Herrero; Cristina Pérez Galán (eds.). Las mujeres de la Edad Media: actividades políticas, socioeconómicas y culturales. Zaragoza: Institución Fernando el Católico. pp. 13–36. ISBN 978-84-9911-303-6.
- Lapeña Paúl, Ana Isabel (2004). Sancho Ramírez: Rey de Aragón (1064?–1094) y rey de Navarra (1076–1094). Ediciones Trea.
- Mann, Janice (2009). Romanesque Architecture and Its Sculptural Decoration in Christian Spain, 1000–1120: Exploring Frontiers and Defining Identities. University of Toronto Press.
- Quetgles Roca, María Lluïsa (2011). "Una nova lectura iconogràfica del sarcòfag de doña Sancha". Porticvm: Revista d'Estudis Medievals. 2: 16–25.
- Simon, David L. (1979). "Le sarcophage de dona Sancha à Jaca". Cahiers de Saint-Michel-de-Cuxa. 10: 107–24.
- Simon, David L. (1993). "Sarcophagus of Doña Sancha". The Art of Medieval Spain, A.D. 500–1200. New York: Metropolitan Museum of Art. pp. 229–32.
- Vinyoles i Vidal, Teresa María (2003). "Las mujeres del año mil". Aragón en la Edad Media. 17: 5–26.
