= Ramiro II =

Ramiro II may refer to:

- Ramiro II of León (died 951)
- Ramiro II of Aragon (died 1157)
