= Bernard-Roger of Foix =

French count of Couserans (c. 962 – c. 1024)

Bernard-Roger, Count of Bigorre
- Coat of arms of Couserans
- Born: c. 962
- Died: c. 1034
- Noble family: House of Foix
- Spouse: Gersenda of Bigorre
- Issue Detail: Bernard II of Foix, count of Bigorre; Roger I of Foix, count of Foix; Peter of Foix, lord of Couserans; Ermesinda of Bigorre; Stephanie, Queen of Navarre (possibly)
- Father: Roger I of Carcassonne
- Mother: Adelaide of Rouergue

Bernard Roger (c. 962 – c. 1024) was the count of Couserans, in which capacity he was lord of parts of Comminges and Foix.

== Life ==
Bernard Roger was the son of count Roger I of Carcassonne and Adelaide de Melgueil. His elder brother, Raymond I of Carcassonne inherited the county of Carcassonne and the remaining part of the lordship of Comminges. Bernard Roger's comital status is attested in the donation to the abbey of Saint-Hilaire in 1011. During his father's lifetime, Bernard Roger married Garsenda, the heiress of the county of Bigorre.

He built the square tower of the castle at Foix in France and made it his capital, from which a town grew. He had endowed the monastery at Foix and in it he was buried when he died at the age of 72.

== Marriage and issue ==
Bernard-Roger and Gersenda had:

- Bernard II of Foix, count of Bigorre, took the County of Bigorre.
- Roger I of Foix, count of Foix, became the first count of Foix, which included the castles of Castelpenent, Roquemaure, Lordat, and several within the county of Toulouse.
- Peter of Foix, lord of Couserans, inherited the lordship of Couserans.
- Ermesinda married King Ramiro I of Aragon
- Marjorie, married Pons, Count of Toulouse
- (Possibly) Stephanie, (Note: According to Elaine Graham-Leigh, Stephanie was the daughter of Bernard-Roger and Gersenda of Bigorre.) married García Sánchez III of Pamplona.

== Sources ==
- Graham-Leigh, Elaine (2005). The Southern French Nobility and the Albigensian Crusade. The Boydell Press.

Bernard-Roger of Foix House of Foix Born: c. 962 Died: c. 1034
New division	Lord of Foix c. 1011 – c. 1034	Succeeded by Roger I
Preceded by García Lupus	Count of Bigorre; 1030 – c. 1034	Succeeded by Bernard II
New division	Lord of Couserans c. 1011 – c. 1034	Succeeded by Peter I
