= Binacua =

- Locality
- Binacúa
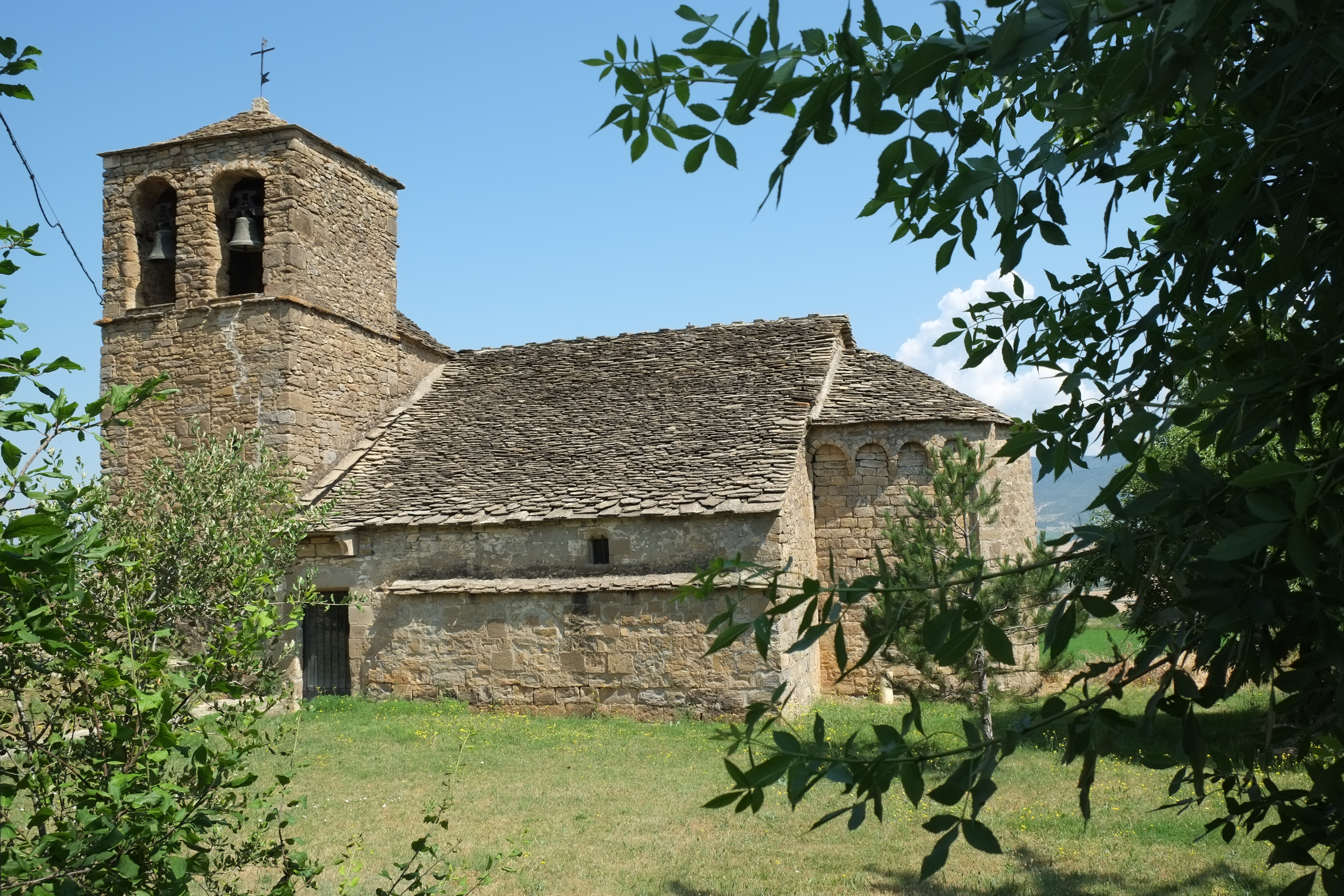

- Location within Aragon Location within Spain
- Coordinates: 42°32′49″N 0°41′56″W
- Country: Spain
- Autonomous community: Aragon
- Province: Province of Huesca
- Municipality: Santa Cruz de la Serós
- Elevation: 765 m (2,510 ft)

Population
  - Total: 28

Binacua or Binacúa is a hamlet located in the municipality of Santa Cruz de la Serós, in Huesca province, Aragon, Spain. As of 2024, it has a population of 28.

== Geography ==
Binacua is located 83km north-northwest of Huesca.
