= Ermesinda of Bigorre =

Queen of Aragon from 1036 to 1049

Ermesinda
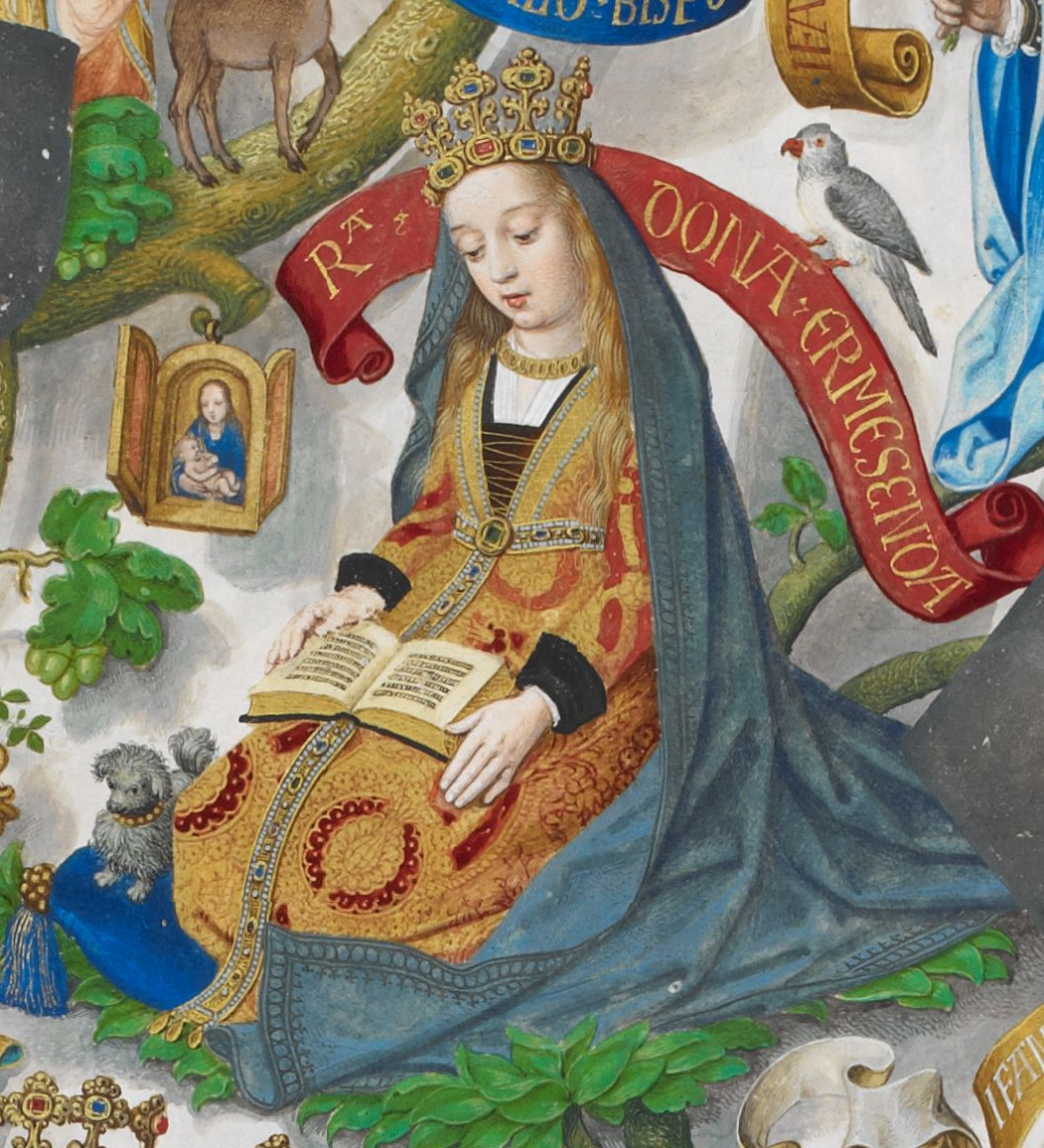
- A depiction of Queen Ermesinda with a book

Queen consort of Aragon
- Tenure: 1036–1049
- Born: 1015
- Died: 1 December 1049 (aged 33–34)
- Spouse: Ramiro I of Aragon
- Issue: Sancho Ramírez; García, Bishop of Jaca; Teresa; Sancha; Urraca
Names
- Ermesinda (born Gerberga)
- House: House of Foix
- Father: Bernard-Roger, Count of Bigorre
- Mother: Garsenda, Heiress of Bigorre

Ermesinda of Bigorre (Aragonese: Ermisenda de Bigorra), born Gerberga or Gisberga (1015 – 1 December 1049), was a Queen of Aragon, daughter of Bernard-Roger, Count of Bigorre, and Garsenda of Bigorre. She was a member of the House of Foix, the sister of Bernard II, Count of Bigorre, Roger I, Count of Foix, and perhaps of Stephanie, Queen of Navarre who married García Sánchez III of Navarre.

== Marriage and death ==
Gerberga married on 22 August 1036 to King Ramiro I of Aragon. After her wedding Gerberga changed her name to Ermesinda. The couple were married for 13 years, in which time her husband elevated himself from a vassal holding scattered lands around Jaca into a de facto ruler of pocket-kingdom spanning the former counties of Aragon, Sobrarbe and Ribagorza, and is thereby credited with being the first King of Aragon. They had five children:

1. Sancho Ramírez (c. 1042 – 4 June 1094), succeeded his father
2. García, Bishop of Jaca (d. 17 July 1086)
3. Teresa (b. 1037), married Guillaume V Bertrand, Count of Provence, no issue
4. Sancha (d. 1097), possibly married firstly to Pons II Guillaume, Count of Toulouse, and secondly c. 1063 to Ermengol III, Count of Urgell, no issue
5. Urraca (d. 1077), a nun from 1061 at the Convent of Santa María of Santa Cruz de la Serós

All of Ermesinda's children lived to adulthood. She died on 1 December 1049 and she was buried at the Monastery of San Juan de la Peña. Her husband remarried four years later to Agnes.

Ermesinda of Bigorre House of Foix Born: circa 1015 Died: 1 December 1049
Royal titles
New Title	Queen consort of Aragon; 1036–1049	Succeeded by Agnes
