= Ramiro II of Aragon =

King of Aragon from 1134 to 1137/1157

Ramiro II
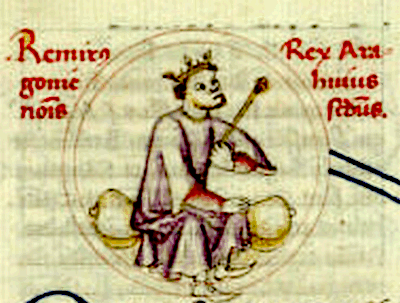
- Depiction from the Genealogies dels comtes de Barcelona, 15th century

King of Aragon
- Reign: 29 September 1134 – 13 November 1137 (de facto) or 16 August 1157 (in title only)
- Predecessor: Alfonso I
- Successor: Petronilla
- Born: 24 April 1086
- Died: 16 August 1157 (aged 71); Huesca
- Burial: Abbey of San Pedro el Viejo
- Consort: Agnes of Aquitaine
- Issue: Petronilla
- House: House of Jiménez
- Father: Sancho Ramírez
- Mother: Felicia of Roucy

Ramiro II (24 April 1086 – 16 August 1157), called the Monk, was a member of the House of Jiménez who became King of Aragon in 1134. Although a monk, he was elected by the Aragonese nobility to succeed his childless brother Alfonso the Battler. He then had a daughter, Petronilla, whom he had marry Count Ramon Berenguer IV of Barcelona, unifying Aragon and Barcelona into the Crown of Aragon. He withdrew to a monastery in 1137, leaving authority to Ramon Berenguer but keeping the royal title until his death.

== Early life ==
Ramiro was the youngest son of Sancho Ramírez, king of Aragon and Navarre, and Felicia of Roucy. Sancho placed Ramiro as a child into the Benedictine monastery of Saint Pons de Thomières in the Viscounty of Béziers. As a respected monk, Ramiro was elected abbot of the Castilian royal monastery of Santos Fecundo y Primitivo in Sahagún and later was abbot of the monastery of San Pedro el Viejo at Huesca. Wanting to limit Ramiro's power within the Kingdom of Navarre-Aragon, his brother Alfonso the Battler had blocked his elections as bishop of Burgos and as bishop of Pamplona.

In 1134 Ramiro had been elected bishop of Barbastro-Roda when the death of his childless brother made him one of the candidates for succession to the crown. Others put forward included Alfonso VII of Castile, who as a foreign king found little support, and the choice of the Navarrese nobility, Pedro de Atarés, grandson of Sancho Ramírez, Count of Ribagorza, the illegitimate son of Ramiro I of Aragon. At an assembly at Borja intended to resolve the succession, a misunderstanding alienated Pedro from his supporters, yet they were unwilling to accept the Aragonese-favored Ramiro, and in the end the kingdoms were divided. In Navarre, García Ramírez, a scion of the pre-union royal family of Navarre and protégé of Alfonso VII was chosen king, while in Aragon the choice fell on Ramiro, who suspended his monastic vows to take the crown.

== King of Aragon ==
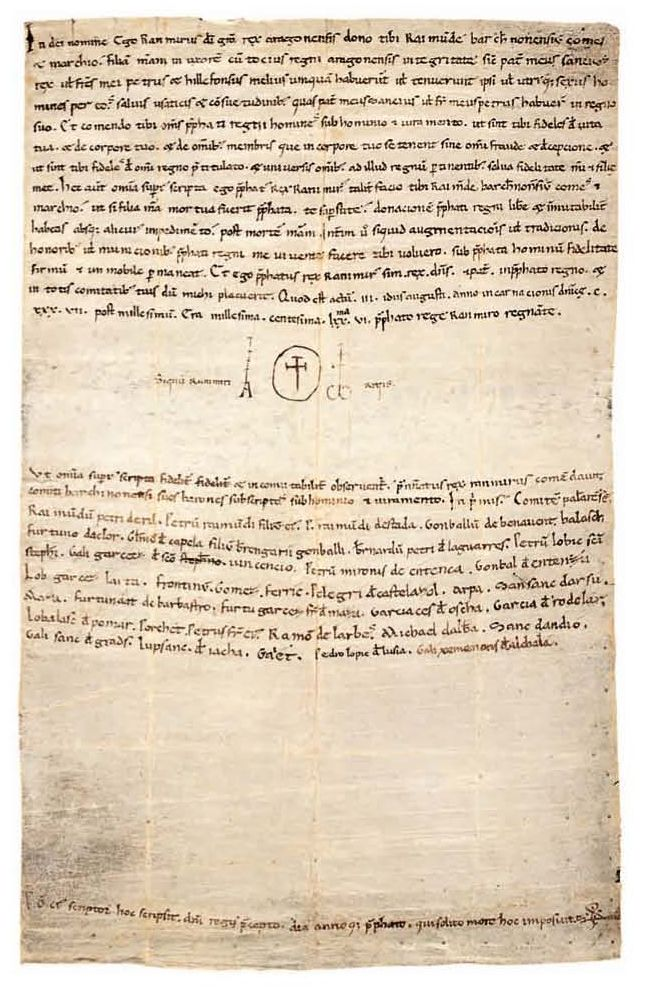
Marriage contract between Ramiro (on behalf of his daughter) and Ramon Berenguer

The reign of Ramiro the Monk, as he is known, was tumultuous. At the beginning of his reign he had problems with his nobles, who thought he would be docile and easily steered to their wishes, but discovered him to be inflexible. In order to produce an heir, Ramiro married Agnes, daughter of Duke William IX of Aquitaine. He and Agnes had a daughter, Petronilla, who was betrothed to Count Ramon Berenguer IV of Barcelona at the age of one. The marriage contract, signed at Barbastro on 11 August 1137, made Petronilla the heir to the crown of Aragon, which in event of her childless death would pass to Ramon Berenguer and any children he might have by other wives. Ramon accepted Ramiro as "King, Lord and Father", and the County of Barcelona and the Kingdom of Aragon were united into the Crown of Aragon. The previously-landlocked Aragonese state thus returned to the position of peninsular power it had held prior to the loss of Navarre, and received a window to the Western Mediterranean it would come to dominate.

In the time between his accession and the betrothal of his daughter, Ramiro II had already had to put down a rebellion of the nobles, and knowing himself not to be a war king, he passed royal authority to his son-in-law Ramon Berenguer on 13 November 1137. Ramon became the "Prince of the Aragonese people" (Princeps Aragonensis) and effective chief of the kingdom's armies. Ramiro withdrew from public life, returning to the Abbey of San Pedro in Huesca. He later became known for the famous and passionate legend of the Bell of Huesca. He died there on 16 August 1157 and is buried there.

In 1137 he ceded the throne but continued to hold the title of king until his death, and even so the chronicles written in other kingdoms mention him. Regardless of Ramiro's title, his daughter Petronilla was using the title of regina (queen) in not only the document about her abdication in 1164 but also her will, written in 1152, before her father's death.

== Sources ==
- Belenguer, Ernest (2006). «Aproximación a la historia de la Corona de Aragón». La Corona de Aragón. El poder y la imagen de la Edad Media a la Edad Moderna (siglos XII – XVIII). Sociedad Estatal para la Acción Cultural Exterior (SEACEX), Generalitat Valenciana y Ministerio de Cultura de España: Lunwerg, pp. 25–53. ISBN 84-9785-261-3
- Bisson, Thomas N. (2000). The Medieval Crown of Aragon: A Short History. Oxford: Clarendon Press.
- Chaytor, Henry John. (1933). A History of Aragon and Catalonia. London: Methuan Publishing.
- Graham-Leigh, Elaine (2005). The Southern French Nobility and the Albigensian Crusade. The Boydell Press.
- Lapeña Paúl, Ana Isabel. (2008). Ramiro II de Aragón: el rey monje (1134–1137). Gijón: Trea. ISBN 978-84-9704-392-2

Ramiro II of Aragon Jiménez dynasty Born: c.1075 Died: 16 August 1157
Regnal titles
Preceded by Alfonso I	King of Aragon; 1134–1137/1157	Succeeded by Petronilla
