= Battle of Tafalla =

Medieval battle in Spain

At the Battle of Tafalla, García Sánchez III of Navarre defeated his brother, Ramiro I of Aragon, who was invading his kingdom, near Tafalla. Allied with García was his brother Ferdinand I of Castile, and Ramiro brought with him his Moorish allies, the kings of the taifas of Zaragoza, Tudela, and Huesca.

According to the earliest source, the Historia Silense, the battle took place in 1035, but in the early modern period the Navarrese historian José de Moret re-dated it to 1043 on the basis of a document of that year by which García granted his alférez Fortún Sánchez the village of Ororbia in gratitude for a black horse which Sancho had given him and which the king had used in the battle of Tafalla.

The Historia places the battle shortly after the death of García and Ramiro's father, Sancho the Great (18 October 1035), while García was returning from a pilgrimage to Rome. Taking advantage of his brother's absence, Ramiro is said to have invaded Navarre with the intention of expanding his own Kingdom of Aragon or seizing García's throne, despite his vow to his father to maintain peace with his brothers. García returned in time to ally with their other brother, surprise and surround Ramiro, who had to flee the field shamefully, barefoot atop a horse without spurs or a bit, according to the later chronicler Lucas de Tuy. He left behind his baggage, arms, tents, and that black horse captured by the Navarrese alférez.

At Torreta and Barranquel, García erected two large rocks in memory of his victory. Spanish historian Justo Pérez de Urbel argues on the basis of some coinage of García's minted at Jaca, Ramiro's capital, that the Navarrese king overran the Aragonese kingdom after his victory. The brothers were reconciled by 2 November 1044, when all three of them met at García's capital of Nájera to discuss a campaign of reconquista against Calahorra the next year. Probably García's mother, Muniadona of Castile, interceded on behalf of Ramiro, who, if a later story in the Chronica Naierensis is to be believed, had once defended her against García's false accusations of adultery.

In a letter to Paternus, abbot of San Juan de la Peña, that must be dated shortly before the confrontation at Tafalla, Odilo, abbot of Cluny, conveys, in words apparently meant to reach Ramiro, his support for the Aragonese in the impending war between the successors of Sancho the Great. He reassures Paternus that he has heard a good report about Ramiro from Sancho, Bishop of Pamplona, and that he has instructed the Cluniac monks to recite the psalms for the benefit of Ramiro. His reference to the threat ab incursione paganorum et a persecutione falsorum Christianorum (from the incursion of the pagans [Moors] and the persecution of false Christians [his brothers]) indicates he was unaware that Ramiro had allied with his Muslim neighbours.
