= San Caprasio =

Coordinates: 42°31′25″N 0°40′30″W

Iglesia de San Caprasio
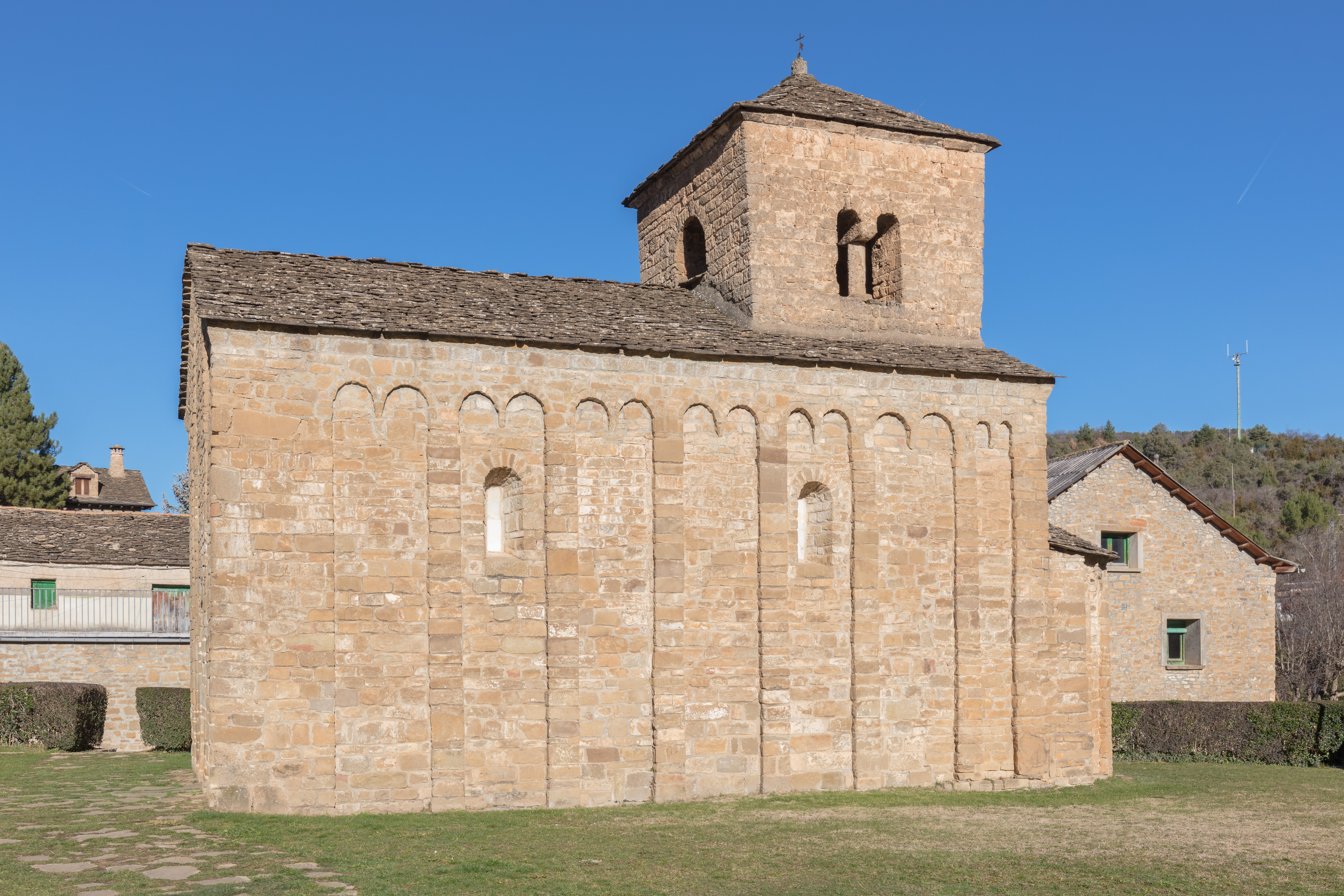
- Exterior
- Iglesia de San Caprasio
- Country: Spain
- Denomination: Catholic

Architecture
- Style: Lombard Romanesque

Administration
- Diocese: Jaca

San Caprasio is a church in Santa Cruz de la Serós, Jacetania, Spain, in First Romanesque style.

== History ==
The church is dedicated to St. Caprasius, a 4th-century Gaulish-Roman saint connected to the pilgrims who, during the Middle Ages, ran the Way of Santiago. The town of Santa Cruz de la Serós was located some 3 km (2 mi) from the route.

It was erected in the early 11th-century in Lombard-Romanesque style, perhaps with support of artists and craftsmen from northern Italy. In 1089 the diocese of Jaca gave the church to monastery of San Juan de la Peña, which, for some time, converted it into a priorate.

== Architecture ==
The church has not undergone substantial modifications since its construction in the 11th century, with the exception of the 12th-century bell tower, which is separated from the interior.

The main body, in stone, has a single nave, with two cross vaults. The apse, of small size, is surmounted by a barrel vault and sided by blind arcades and three windows. The external perimeter also features both columns and blind arcades.

== Gallery ==
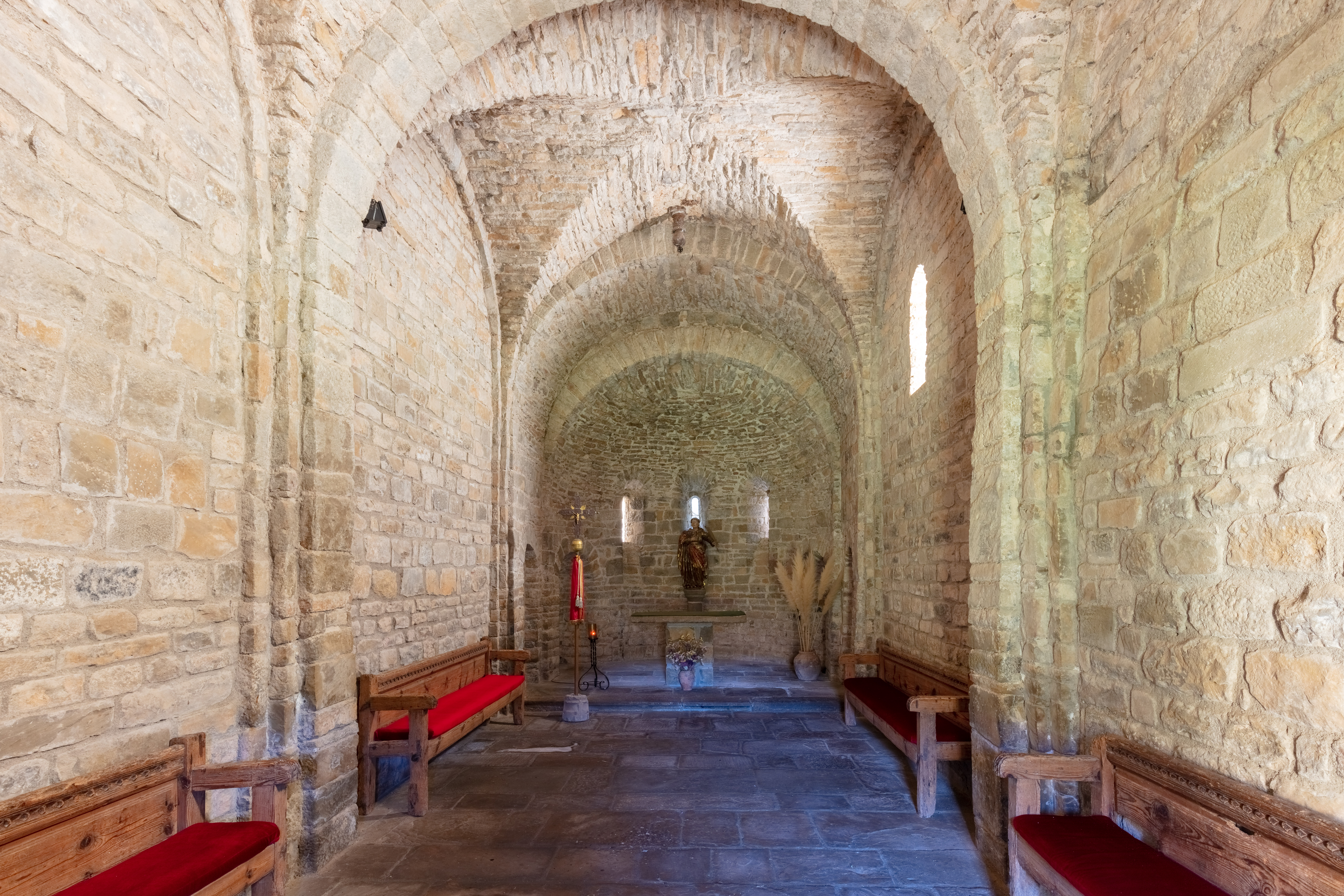
Interior

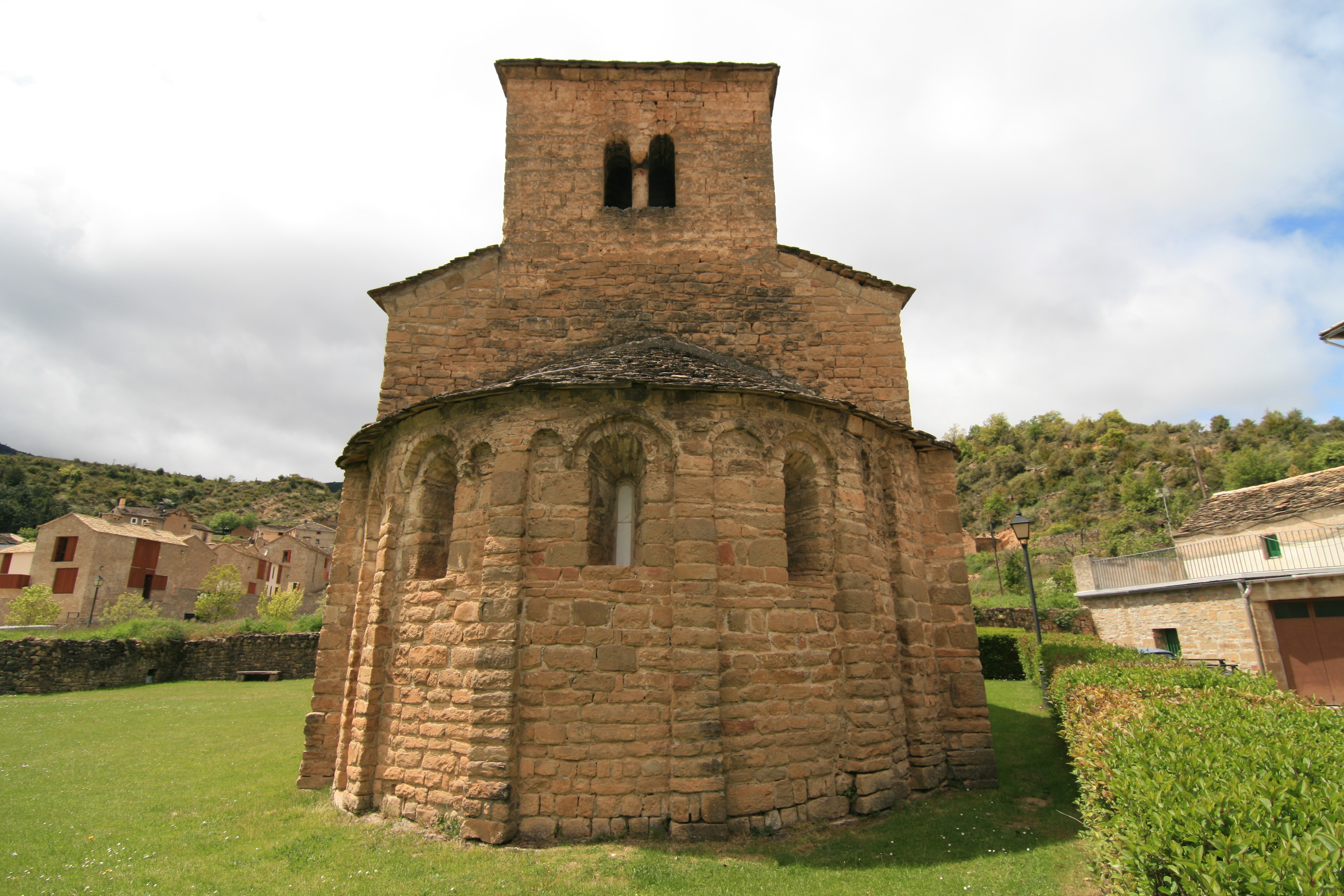
Apse

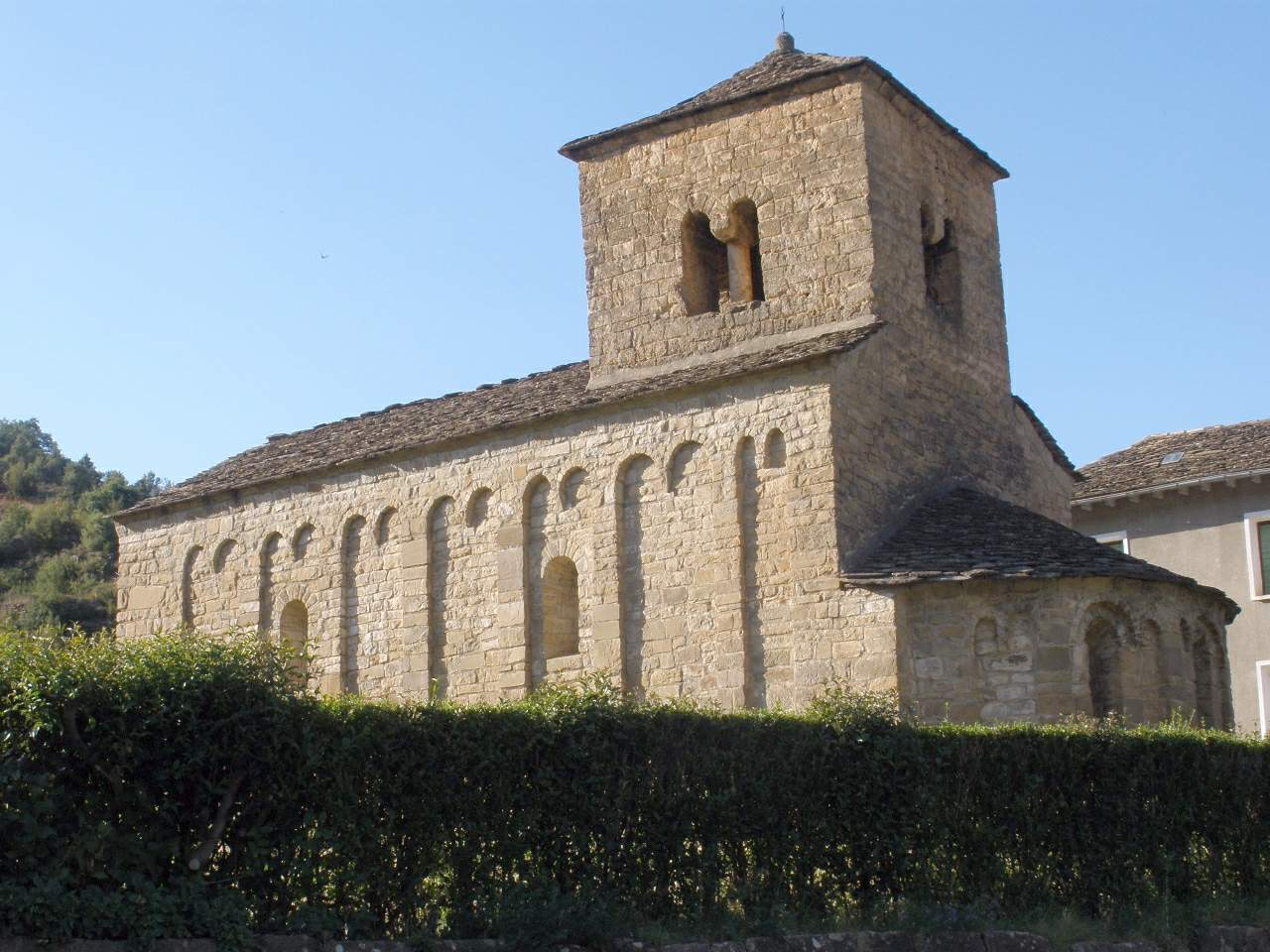
Exterior

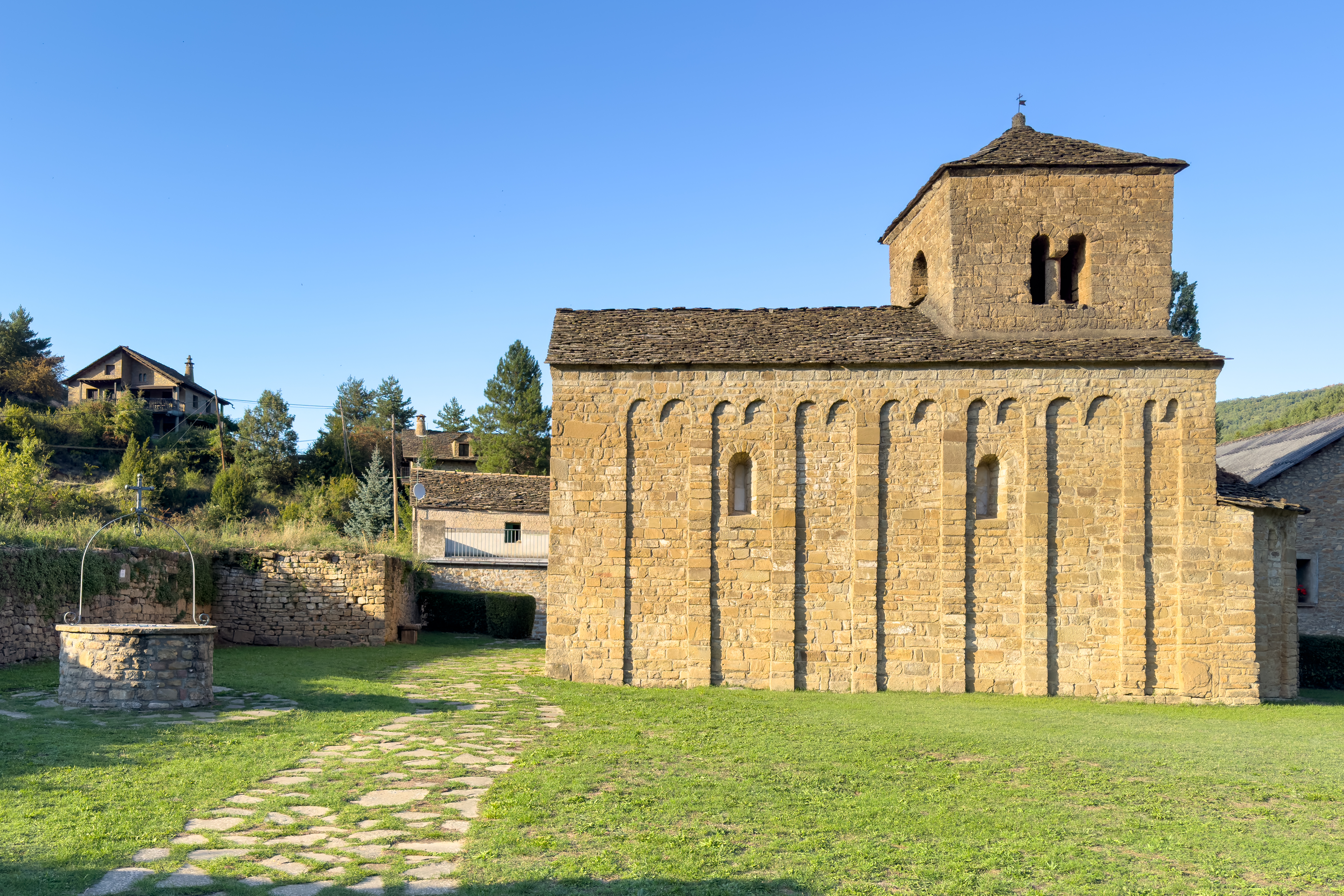
Exterior

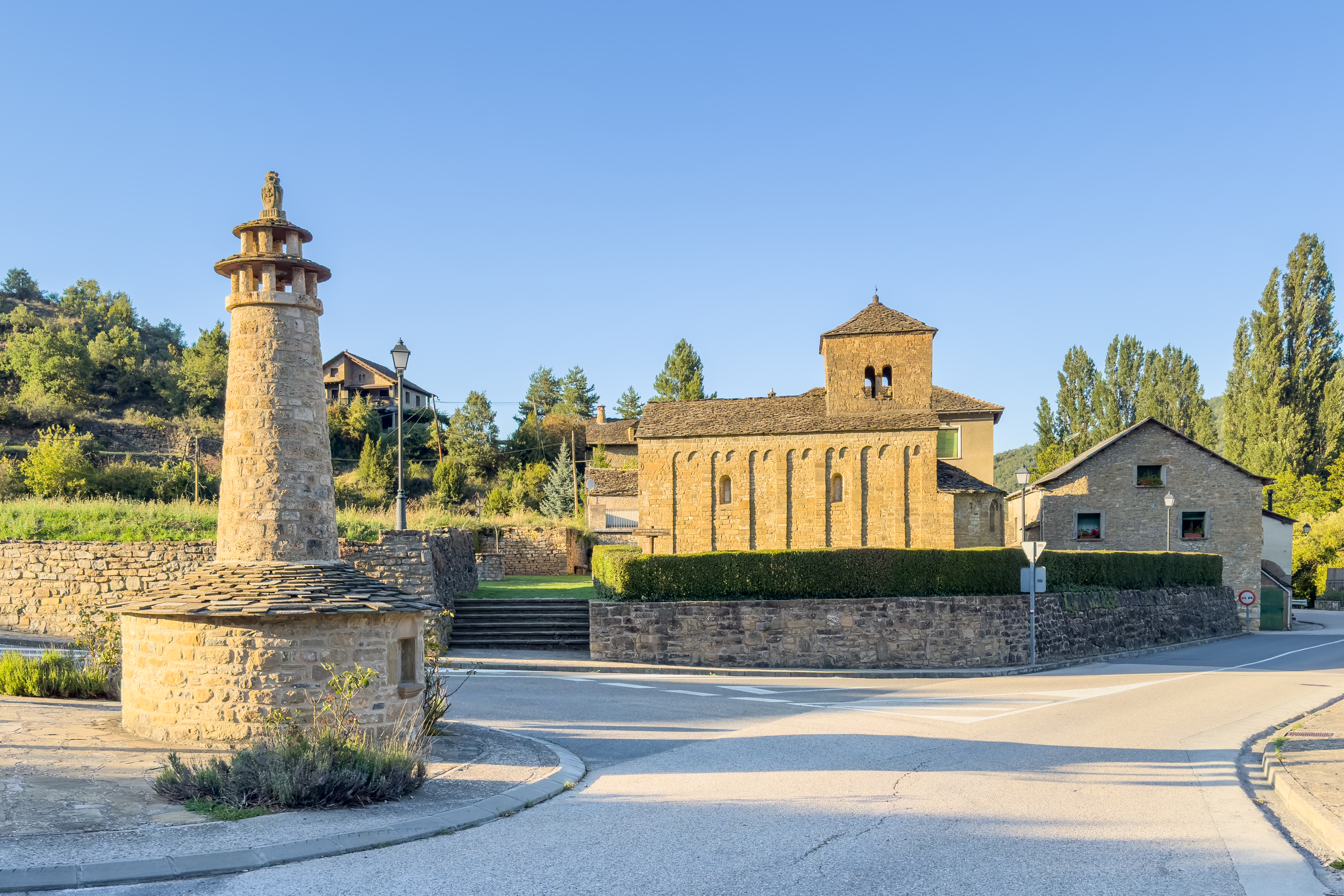
Exterior

== Sources ==
- Aramendía, José Luis (2002). El Romanico en Aragón. Zaragoza: Ediciones Leyere.
