= Ramiro I of Aragon =

King of Aragon from 1035 to 1063

Ramiro I
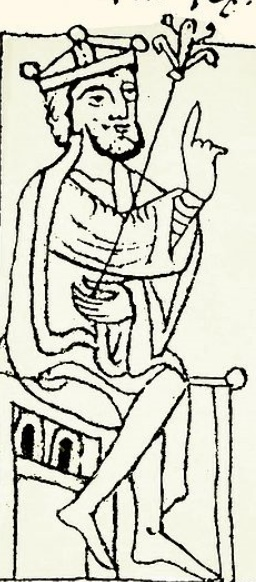
- 13th-century miniature of Ramiro

King of Aragon
- Reign: 1035 – 1063
- Successor: Sancho Ramírez
- Born: before 1007
- Died: 8 May 1063 (aged 55–56); Graus
- Burial: Royal Monastery of San Juan de la Peña
- Spouse: Ermesinda of Bigorre; Agnes
- Issue: Sancho Ramírez I & V; García, Bishop of Pamplona; Sancha, Countess of Urgell; Urraca; Theresa, Countess of Provence; (ill.) Sancho, Count of Ribagorza
- House: House of Jiménez
- Father: Sancho III of Pamplona
- Mother: Sancha of Aybar

Ramiro I (bef. 1007 – 8 May 1063) was the first King of Aragon from 1035 until his death. His kingdom was small and unfederated, which was sometimes referred to as a petty kingdom. Although he inherited a minor kingdom, he expanded the nascent Kingdom of Aragon through his acquisition of territories, such as Sobrarbe, Ribagorza and the city of Sangüesa. Sancho Ramírez was his son and successor, becoming the King of Aragon. Ramiro also became King of Pamplona.

== Biography ==
The signum regis of Ramiro.

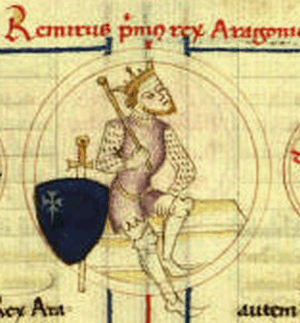
Ramiro I of Aragon in the 15th century manuscript Genealogies of the Counts of Barcelona

Apparently born before 1007, he was the illegitimate son of Sancho III of Pamplona by his mistress Sancha of Aybar. Ramiro was reputed to have been adopted by his father's wife Muniadona after he was the only one of his father's children to come to her aid when needed, although there is no surviving record of these events and the story is probably apocryphal.

During his father's reign, he appeared as witness of royal charters starting in 1011, and was given numerous properties in the county of Aragon, and by the division of Sancho's realm on the latter's death in 1035, the county of Aragon fell to Ramiro with the title of baiulus or steward. This was part of what would prove to be a larger division: Navarre and the Basque country went to eldest half-brother García, the county of Castile was held by Ferdinand, while the counties of Sobrarbe and Ribagorza fell to Gonzalo and Ramiro received lands in Aragon to hold under García.

Ramiro's exact status is vague. He was called king by his vassals, neighbors, the church and even his sons, yet he always referred to himself simply as Ranimiro Sancioni regis filio (Ramiro, son of King Sancho). Likewise, in his two wills, he refers to his lands as having been given him in stewardship: in the first by García, and in the second by God. He is called regulus (rather than rex used for García) and quasi pro rege (acting as if king) in charters from Navarre. Due to his growing independence and the small size of his Pyrenean holdings, he is sometimes called a "petty king", Aragon a "pocket kingdom".

Ramiro sought to enlarge his lands at the expense of both the Moors and his brother, García, the King of Navarre. Shortly after the death of his father (the date variously placed from 1036 to 1043), he supported the emir of Tudela in an invasion of the Navarre. While he was defeated in the Battle of Tafalla, he still was able to gain territory, including Sanguesa, and established a state of semi-autonomy. In 1043, apparently with the approval of García, he annexed Sobrarbe and Ribagorza, previously held by his youngest legitimate half-brother, Gonzalo. This union created a pseudo-independent Aragonese state, with its capital at Jaca, that would give rise to the Kingdom of Aragon.

After annexation of Ribagorza and Sobrarbe, Ramiro began the advance from Aragon toward Huesca and Zaragoza. The first charter for the royal town of Jaca is attributed to him. It included well defined laws of protection even to non-residents, and would set an example for urban rights until late in the Middle Ages.

Ramiro died at the Battle of Graus in 1063 while trying to take the city.

He was buried at the monastery of San Juan de la Peña, in Santa Cruz de la Serós. In August 2026, his bones, along with those of his successors Sancho Ramírez and Peter I were removed from the monastery for safekeeping as wildfires encroached on the site.

== Marriage and children ==
Before he was married, Ramiro had a mistress named Amuña (Amunna) with whom he had an illegitimate son, Sancho, in whom he confided the government of the county of Ribagorza. Via a son García of Aybar and Atarés, Count Sancho was grandfather of Pedro de Atarés, a candidate to succeed Alfonso the Battler.

Ramiro's first wife was Gisberga, daughter of Bernard Roger of Bigorre, on 22 August 1036. She changed her name to Ermesinda on marrying him. Together the couple had five children:

- Sancho I Ramírez (c. 1042 – 4 June 1094), his successor
- García, Bishop of Jaca (d. 17 July 1086)
- Sancha (c. 1045–1097), married to Ermengol III, Count of Urgel between 1063 and 1065, no issue.
- Urraca (d. 1077), nun from 1061 in the Convent of Santa María de Santa Cruz de la Serós
- Theresa (b. 1037), who married William V Bertrand, Count of Provence, no issue.

Ramiro's second wife from 1054 was Agnes (Inés), perhaps a daughter of the Duke of Aquitaine. No children are known from this marriage.

== Sources ==
- Ávila Seoane, Nicolás (2016). Intitulación y data con los hijos de Sancho III el Mayor (PDF). Colección Monofráficas de la Sociedad Española de Estudios Medievales (in Spanish). Madrid: CSIC. ISBN 978-84-945433-1-9.
- Balaguer, Federico (1960). "Doña Amuña: un amor juvenil de Ramiro I de Aragon" (PDF). Argensola: Revista de Ciencias Sociales del Instituto de Estudios Altoaragoneses (43): 239–242.
- Ballesteros y Beretta, Antonio (1920). Historia de España y su influencia en la historia universal (in Spanish). Barcelona: Salvat. OCLC 163181517.
- Chaytor, H.J. (1933). A History of Aragon and Catalonia. London: Methuen. ISBN 9780404014797.
- Lourie, Elena (October 1975). "The Will of Alfonso I, 'El Batallador', King of Aragon and Navarre: A Reassessment". Speculum. 50 (4). The University of Chicago Press: 635–651. doi:10.2307/2855471. JSTOR 2855471. S2CID 159659007.
- Nelson, Lynn (1983). "The Aragonese Acquisition of Sobrarbe and Ribagorza". Estudios en homenaje a Don Claudio Sánchez Albornoz en sus 90 years. Vol. II. Buenos Aires: Instituto de Historia de España. pp. 227–236. OCLC 13009842.
- Nelson, Lynn H., ed. (1991). The Chronicle of San Juan de la Peña: A Fourteenth-century Official History of the Crown of Aragon. University of Pennsylvania Press.
- Ubieto Arteta, Antonio (1960a). "Estudios en torno a la división del Reino por Sancho el Mayor de Navarra" (PDF). Príncipe de Viana (in Spanish). No. Year 21, No. 78-79. pp. 5–26. ISSN 0032-8472.
- Ubieto Arteta, Antonio (1960b). "Estudios en torno a la división del Reino por Sancho el Mayor de Navarra" (PDF). Príncipe de Viana (in Spanish). No. Year 21, No. 80-81. pp. 163–236. ISSN 0032-8472.
- Viruete Erdozáin, Roberto (2008). Aragón en la época de Ramiro I (in Spanish). Zaragoza: Universidad de Zaragoza. ISBN 978-84-692-2032-0.
- Viruete Erdozáin, Roberto (2013). La colección diplomática del reinado de Ramiro I de Aragón (1035–1064) (PDF). Fuentes históricas aragonesas (66) (in Spanish). Zaragoza: Institución Fernando el Católico (C.S.I.C.). Excma. Diputación de Zaragoza. ISBN 9788499112190.

Ramiro I of Aragon House of Jiménez Born: before 1007 Died: 8 May 1063
Regnal titles
New title	King of Aragon; 1035–1063	Succeeded by Sancho Ramírez
