= Isabella of Urgell =

Queen of Aragon from 1065 to 1070

Isabella of Urgel (Aragonese: Isabel d'Urchel; died 1071) was Queen of Aragon, the only daughter of Ermengol III, Count of Urgell, and his first wife Adelaide of Besalú.

Isabella is mentioned in her brother Ermengol IV's testament.

Isabella married in 1065 King Sancho Ramírez; by this marriage, she was Queen of Aragon. They had one son, Peter I, Sancho's successor who left no surviving children. The couple divorced in 1070, and both remarried. Isabella may have become the second wife of William I, Count of Cerdanya in 1071.

Isabella of Urgell House of Barcelona Cadet branch of the Bellonids Born: circa 1052 Died: circa 1071
Royal titles
Preceded by Agnes	Queen consort of Aragon; 1065–1070	Succeeded by Felicia of Roucy
