= Sancho Ramírez =

King of Aragon from 1063 to 1094

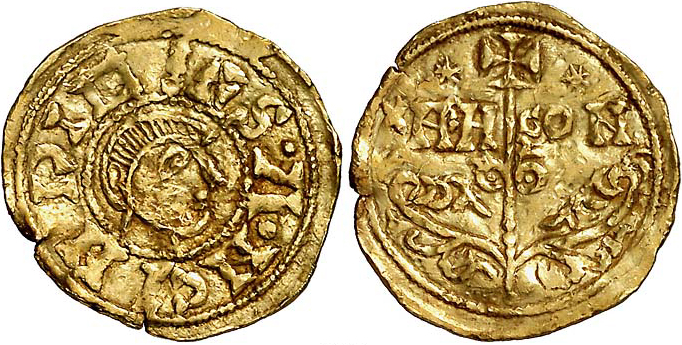
- Gold mancuso of Sancho

King of Aragon
- Reign: 1063–1094
- Predecessor: Ramiro I
- Successor: Peter I

King of Pamplona
- Reign: 1076–1094
- Predecessor: Sancho IV
- Successor: Peter I
- Born: c. 1042
- Died: 4 June 1094; Huesca, Kingdom of Aragon
- Burial: Royal Monastery of San Juan de la Peña
- Spouses: Isabella of Urgell (m. 1062; died 1071) Felicia of Roucy (m. 1071)
- Issue: Peter I of Aragon and Pamplona: Fernando Sánchez; Alfonso I the Battler; Ramiro II the Monk
- House: House of Jiménez
- Father: Ramiro I of Aragon
- Mother: Ermesinda of Bigorre

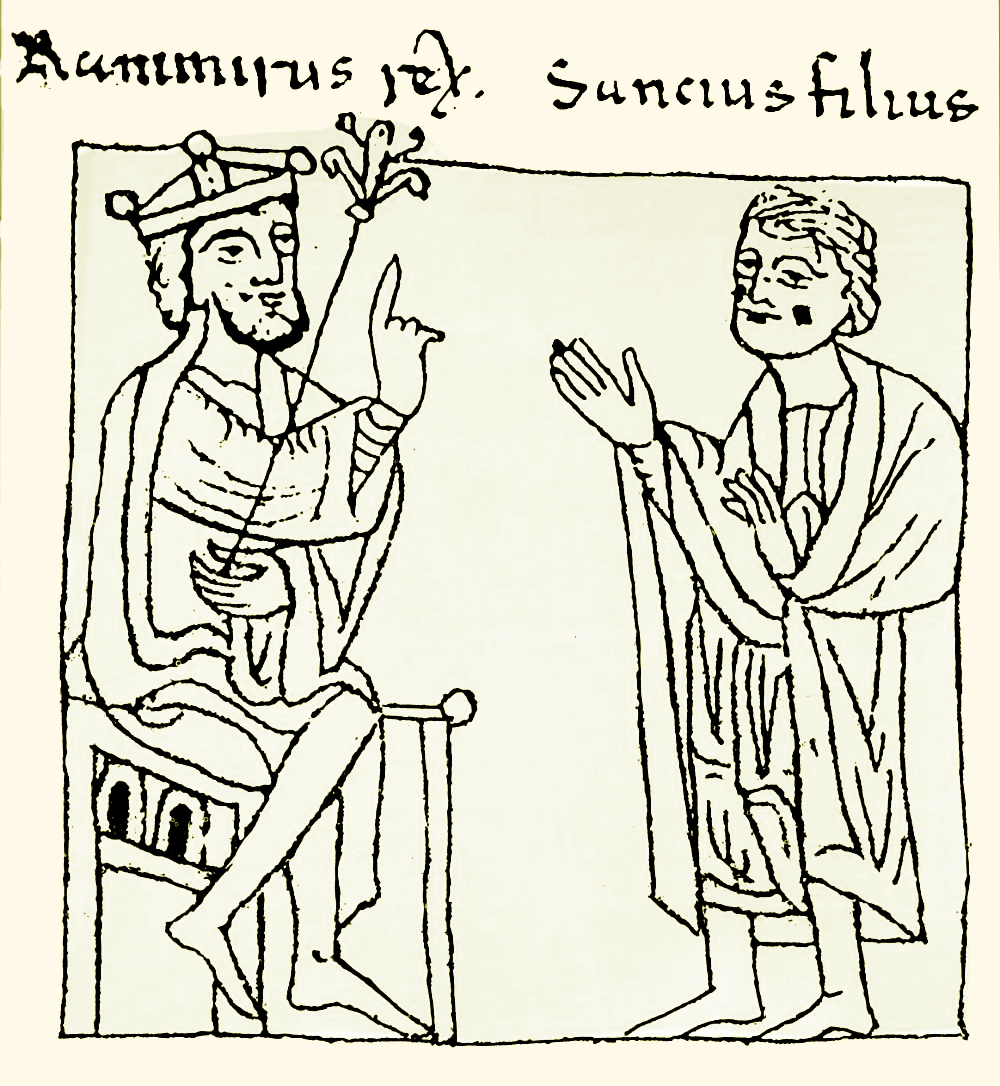
Sancho (Sancius filius, Sancho the son) with his father, King Ramiro (Ranimirus rex) From a thirteenth-century manuscript of Jaca

Sancho Ramírez (c. 1042 – 4 June 1094) was King of Aragon from 1063 until 1094 and King of Pamplona from 1076 under the name of Sancho V (Basque: Antso V.a Ramirez). He was the eldest son of Ramiro I and Ermesinda of Bigorre. His father was the first king of Aragon and an illegitimate son of Sancho III of Pamplona. He inherited the Aragonese crown from his father in 1063. Sancho Ramírez was chosen king of Pamplona by Navarrese noblemen after Sancho IV was murdered by his siblings.

== Biography ==
Sancho Ramírez succeeded his father as second King of Aragon in 1063. Between 1067 and 1068, the War of the Three Sanchos involved him in a conflict with his first cousins, both also named Sancho: Sancho IV the king of Navarre and Sancho II the king of Castile, respectively. The Castilian Sancho was trying to retake Bureba and Alta Rioja, which his father had given away to the king of Navarre and failed to retake. The Navarrese Sancho begged the aid of the Aragonese Sancho to defend his kingdom. Sancho of Castile defeated the two cousins and retook both Bureba and Alta Rioja, as well as Álava.

Sancho Ramírez followed his father's practice, not using the royal title early in his reign even though his state had become fully independent. This changed in 1076, when Sancho IV of Navarre was murdered by his own siblings, thus prompting a succession crisis in this neighboring kingdom that represented Aragon's nominal overlord. At first, the murdered king's young son, García, who had fled to Castile, was recognized as titular king by Alfonso VI, while Sancho Ramírez recruited to his side noblemen of Navarre who resented their kingdom falling under Alfonso's influence. The crisis was resolved by partition. Sancho Ramírez was elected King of Navarre, while he ceded previously contested western provinces of the kingdom to Alfonso. From this time, Sancho referred to himself as king not only of Aragon but also Navarre.

Sancho conquered Barbastro in 1064, Graus in 1083, and Monzón in 1089. He was defeated by El Cid, who was raiding his lands and those of his Muslim allies, at the Battle of Morella, probably in 1084. He perished in 1094 at the battle of Huesca.

In August 2026, his bones, along with those of his predecessor Sancho Ramírez and successor Peter I were removed from the monastery of San Juan de la Peña, in Santa Cruz de la Serós for safekeeping as wildfires encroached on the site.

== Marriages and family ==
Sancho contracted his first marriage in c. 1065, to Isabella (died c. 1071), daughter of Count Armengol III of Urgel. They were divorced 1071. His second marriage, in 1076, was with Felicia (died 3 May 1123), daughter of Hilduin IV, Count of Montdidier. A third marriage—to Philippa of Toulouse—is sometimes given, but contemporary evidence records him as still married to Felicia at the time of his death. He was father of four sons: by Isabella, he had Peter, his successor; by Felicia he had Ferdinand, who was alive in 1086 but died within the next decade, Alfonso, who succeeded Peter, and Ramiro, who succeeded Alfonso.

Sancho Ramírez married Isabella of Urgell, daughter of Ermengol III, Count of Urgell around the year 1062. They had one known child:

- Peter (c. 1068 – 1104), known as "the Catholic", who ruled as King of Aragon and Pamplona from 1094 until 1104. Peter married Agnes of Aquitaine.

Sancho Ramírez remarried around 1071 with Felicia of Roucy, daughter of Hilduin IV, Count of Montdidier. They had three children:

- Fernando Sánchez (1071 – 1094)
- Alfonso Sánchez (c. 1073 – 1134), known as "the Battler", King of Aragon and Pamplona from 1104 until 1134. He married Urraca of León, Queen of León, Castile and Galicia. Their marriage was annulled in 1112.
- Ramiro Sánchez (1086 – 1157), known as "the Monk", King of Aragon between 1134 and 1157, and married to Agnes of Aquitaine in her second marriage after Viscount of Thouars, Aimery V.

== Bibliography ==
- Barton, Simon (1997). The Aristocracy in Twelfth-Century León and Castile. Cambridge University Press.
- Brundage, James A. (1998). "Force and Fear: A Marriage Case from Eleventh-Century Aragon". In Kagay, Donald J.; Vann, Theresa M. (eds.). On the Social Origins of Medieval Institutions: Essays in Honor of Joseph F. O'Callaghan. Vol. 19. Brill.
- Buesa Conde, Domingo (1996). Sancho Ramírez, rey de aragoneses y pamploneses (1064–1094). Zaragoza: Caja de Ahorros y Monte de Piedad de Zaragoza, Aragón y Rioja.
- Canellas López, Ángel (1993). Colección diplomática de Sancho Ramírez. Zaragoza: Real Sociedad Económica Aragonesa de Amigos del País.
- Guenée, Bernard (1978). "Les généalogies entre l'histoire et la politique: la fierté d'être Capétien, en France, au Moyen Age". Annales. Histoire, Sciences Sociales (in French). 33e Année, No. 3 (May - Jun.) (3): 450–477. doi:10.3406/ahess.1978.293943.
- Lapeña Paúl, Ana Isabel (2004). Sancho Ramírez, rey de Aragón (¿1064?–1094) y rey de Navarra (1076–1094). Gijón: Ediciones Trea.
- Makki, Mahmoud (1994). "The Political History of al-Andalus (92/711-897/1492)". In Jayyusi, Salma Khadra (ed.). The Legacy of Muslim Spain. Brill.
- Mann, Janice (2009). Romanesque Architecture and Its Sculptural Decoration in Christian Spain, 1000-1120: Exploring Frontiers and Defining Identities. University of Toronto Press.
- Nelson, Lynn H. (1978). "The Foundation of Jaca (1076): Urban Growth in Early Aragon". Speculum. 53 (4): 688–708. doi:10.2307/2849781. JSTOR 2849781. S2CID 154602626.
- Reilly, Bernard F. (1989). The Kingdom of León-Castilla under King Alfonso VI, 1065–1109. Princeton University Press. ISBN 9788487103032.
- Reilly, Bernard F. (1992). The Contest of Christian and Muslim Spain, 1031–1157. Wiley.
- Reilly, Bernard F. (1993). The Medieval Spains. Cambridge University Press.
- Sarasa Sánchez, Esteban, ed. (1994). Sancho Ramírez, rey de Aragón, y su tiempo (1064–1094). Huesca: Instituto de Estudios Altoaragoneses.
- Smith, Damian (1996). "Sancho Ramírez and the Roman Rite". Studies in Church History. 32: 95–105. doi:10.1017/S0424208400015357. S2CID 163952975.
- Ubieto Arteta, Antonio (1948). "Homenaje de Aragón a Castilla por el condado de Navarra". Estudios de Edad Media de la Corona de Aragón. 3: 7–28.

Sancho Ramírez House of Jiménez Born: c. 1042 Died: 4 Juni 1094
Regnal titles
Preceded by Ramiro I	King of Aragon; 1063–1094	Succeeded by Peter I
Preceded by Sancho IV	King of Navarre; 1076–1094	Succeeded by Peter I
