= Felicia of Roucy =

Queen of Aragon from 1076 to 1094

Felicia de Roucy
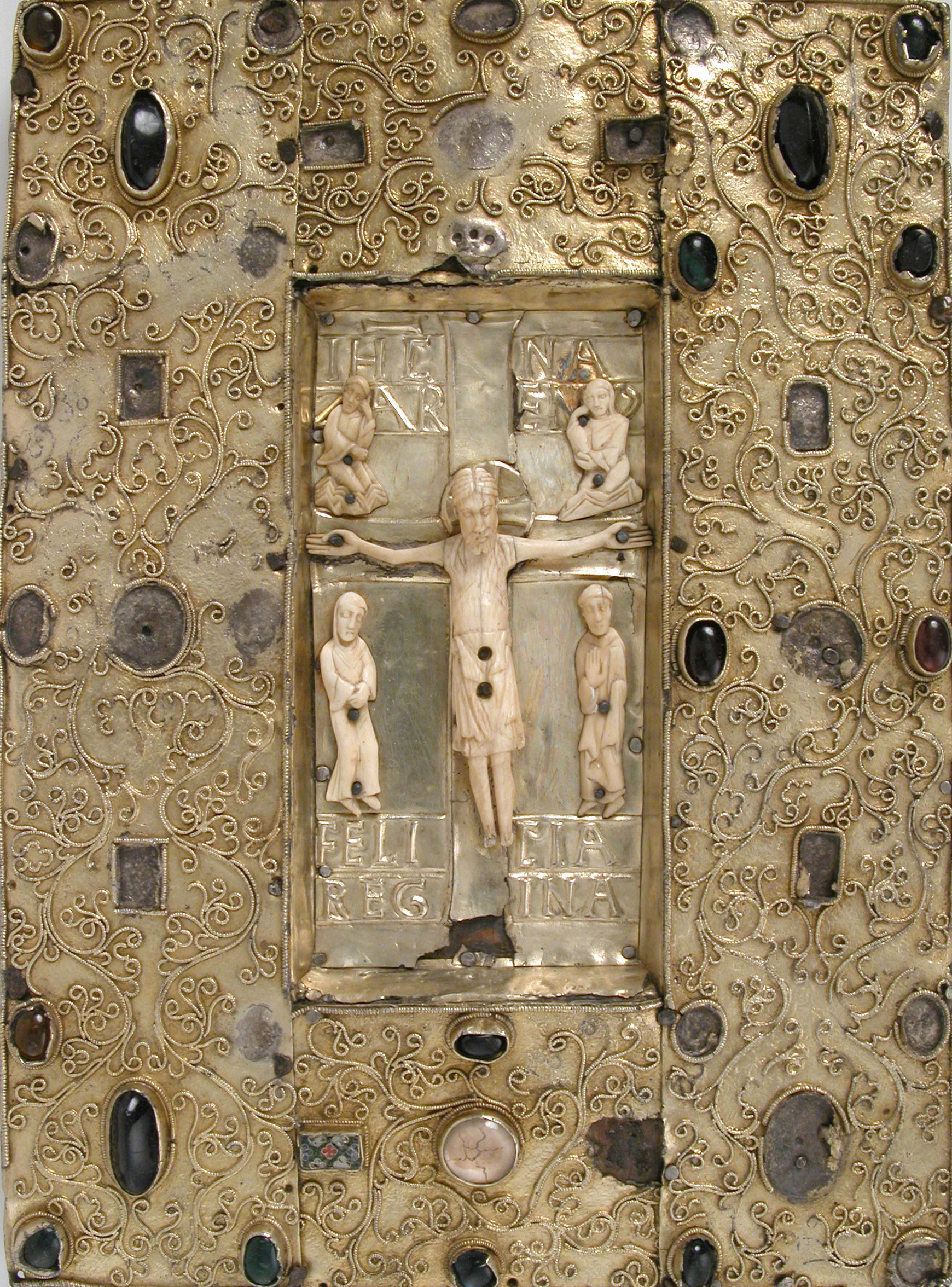
- Born: c. 1055; Barbastro
- Died: after 1094; Barcelona
- Spouse: Sancho Ramírez
- House: House of Montdidier
- Father: Hilduin IV of Montdidier
- Mother: Alice de Roucy

Felicia of Roucy (c. 1055 – after 1094) was a queen consort of Aragon and Navarre. She was the daughter of Hilduin IV of Montdidier and Alice of Roucy. They were Picards.

== Marriage and issue ==
Felicia was married in 1076 to Sancho Ramírez, then king of Aragon after he had divorced his first wife, Isabella of Urgell. His accession to the crown of Navarre later that year made her the first Aragonese consort to be also Queen consort of Navarre. She is attested shortly before her husband's death and is now thought to have outlived Sancho. The supposed subsequent marriage of Sancho to a third wife, Philippa of Toulouse, that appeared in a later chronicle, is now thought to be erroneous.

Felicia and Sancho had three sons:

- Ferdinand
- Alfonso
- Ramiro

== Sources ==
- Antón, José María Monsalvo, ed. (2018). Historia de la España Medieval (in Spanish). Ediciones Universidad Salamanca.
- Brundage, James A. (1998). "Force and Fear: A Marriage Case from Eleventh-Century Aragon". In Kagay, Donald J.; Vann, Theresa M. (eds.). On the Social Origins of Medieval Institutions: Essays in Honor of Joseph F. O'Callaghan. Brill.
- McDougall, Sara (2017). Royal Bastards: The Birth of Illegitimacy, 800-1230. Oxford University Press.

Felicia of Roucy House of Montdidier Born: circa 1060 Died: 3 May 1123
Royal titles
Preceded by Isabella of Urgell	Queen consort of Aragon; 1076–1094	Succeeded by Agnes of Aquitaine
Preceded by Placencia	Queen consort of Navarre; 1076–1094	Succeeded by Agnes of Aquitaine
