= Santa Cruz de la Serós =

Santa Cruz de la Serós (Spanish) Santa Cruz d'as Serors (Aragonese)
- Municipality
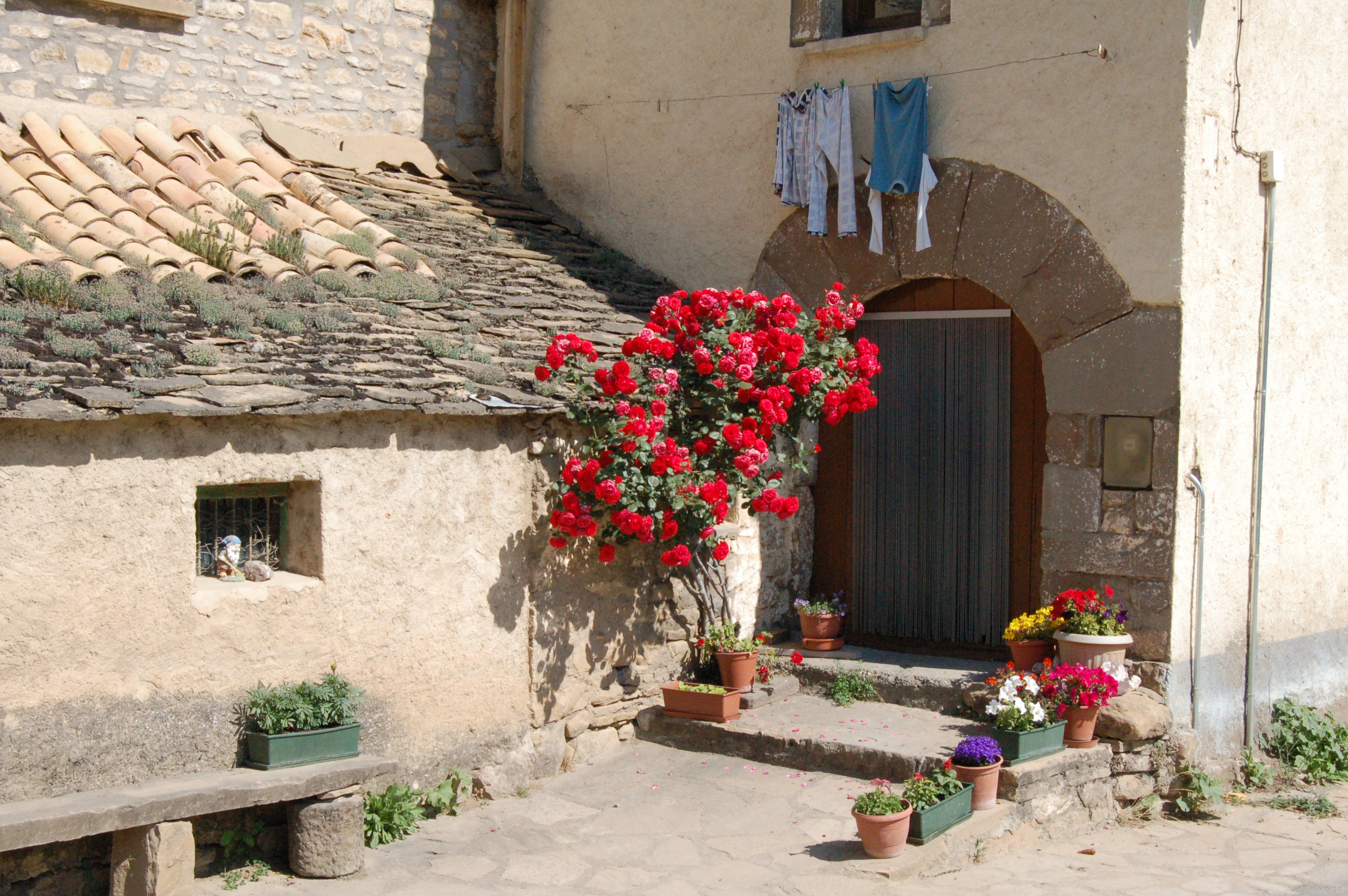

- Coat of arms

- Location in Spain
- Coordinates: 42°31′33″N 0°40′28″W
- Country: Spain
- Autonomous community: Aragon
- Province: Huesca
- Comarca: Jacetania
- Judicial district: Jaca

Area
  - Total: 27 km^{2} (10 sq mi)
- Elevation: 788 m (2,585 ft)

Population (2025-01-01)
  - Total: 193
  - Density: 7.1/km^{2} (19/sq mi)
- Demonym: Santacruceros
- Time zone: UTC+1 (CET)
  - Summer (DST): UTC+2 (CEST)
- Postal code: 22792

Santa Cruz de la Serós (in Aragonese: Santa Cruz d'as Serors) is a village in the province of Huesca, Aragon, Spain. Located 88 kilometers from the city of Huesca, it is located at a hill side on the way to the Monastery of San Juan de la Peña.

== Monuments ==
The village is known for its two First Romanesque churches from which the village takes its name: Serós is a derivation of Sorores, Sisters, i.e. nuns.

- Church of Saint Mary (former monastery): it was built in the 11th century and it is one of the most interesting volumes in Aragonese Romanesque due to the elevated chamber over the vaults of the main nave and the tower.
- Church of San Caprasio (Saint Caprasius), built in the beginning of the 11th century.

== Villages ==
- Santa Cruz de la Serós
- Binacua
