= Muhammad ibn Lubb =

Muhammad ibn Lubb ibn Musa (Arabic: محمد بن لّب بن موسى, k. outskirts of Zaragoza, 898), was a Muslim lord who at different times held Zaragoza and Larida, on the Upper March of Al-Andalus.

== Family ==
Muhammad was son of Lubb ibn Musa (and thus grandson of the famous Musa ibn Musa ibn Qasi), from the prominent Muwallad Muslim Banu Qasi clan, of Visigothic or Hispano-Roman extraction. His mother was ʿAjub al-Balatuyya (Arabic: عَجَب البَلاطيَّة). He had at least six sons, Lubb, Musa, Yusuf, Abd Allah, Yunus and Mutarrif.

== Biography ==
When his father and his uncles rebelled against emir Muhammad I of Córdoba, Muhammad ibn Lubb supported the emir leading an army that defeated his own uncle, Isma'il ibn Musa.

In 882, he had already conquered Zaragoza, where attempted to rule independent of Córdoba lord, but faced with constant pressure of the Arab Banu Tujib clan (Arabic: بنو تجيب), he was forced to sell Zaragoza to the emir by 885. Raimon, count of Pallars acted as intermediary in the transfer.

After further family disputes, and with the ascendancy of Abd Allah to the throne of Córdoba, Muhammad's pact with the new emir led to his appointment as wali of Larida, contrarily to the pretensions that the wali of Huesca, Muhammad al-Tawil. Muhammad ibn Lubb then ceded control of Larida to his son Lubb.

In 897, Muhammad conquered Toledo, and in 898 he initiated a new military campaign to recover Zaragoza, but he was killed during its siege, surprised by an enemy warrior while he was resting, on October 8. Muhammad was succeeded by his son Lubb, who continued his siege of Zaragoza. His son Yunus briefly controlled Monzón but was unable to hold it against Muhammad al-Tawil. Quarrels among Muhammad ibn Lubb's sons and grandchildren, along with pressure from the Kingdom of Pamplona to the north and the Emirate of Córdoba to the south would lead to the complete dismantling of Banu Qasi power throughout the Ebro valley.

== Bibliography ==
- Cañada Juste, Alberto (1980). "Los Banu Qasi (714-924)". Príncipe de Viana (in Spanish) (41). ISSN 0032-8472.
- Mestre i Campi, Jesús (1998). "Diccionari d'Història de Catalunya". Edicions 62: 1.147 p. ISBN 84-297-3521-6.
