= Lubb ibn Muhammad =

Lubb ibn Muhammad ibn Lubb (Arabic: لب بن محمد بن لب) (? - 907), was a wali of Tudela (890–907) and Larida, as well as a prominent Muslim lord on the Upper March of Al-Andalus.

== Family ==
Lubb was a member of the prominent Muwallad Muslim Banu Qasi clan; being the son of Muhammad ibn Lubb and descendant of Musa the Great. Lubb ibn Muhammad had three sons: Abdallah ibn Lubb, who was murdered by Lubb's brother Mutarrif ibn Muhammad; Muhammad ibn Lubb, who would control some of the family properties in the 910s and 920s; and Furtun ibn Lubb, who was expelled from Larida after his father's death and converted to Christianity.

== Background ==
In 889 because of a paralysis, Isma'il ibn Musa ceded power to his sons Mutarrif ibn Isma'il and Musa ibn Isma'il. These two went on a joint expedition to Barbitanya, where Musa was killed and Mutarrif captured by the wali of Huesca, Muhammad al-Tawil. Al-Tawil then launched a counter-attack which ended in the conquest of Larida. In order to limit his power, Umayyad emir Abdallah ibn Muhammad decided to deny Al-Tawil control of the city, and instead awarded it to Lubb's father, who then ceded it to his son Lubb.

== Biography ==
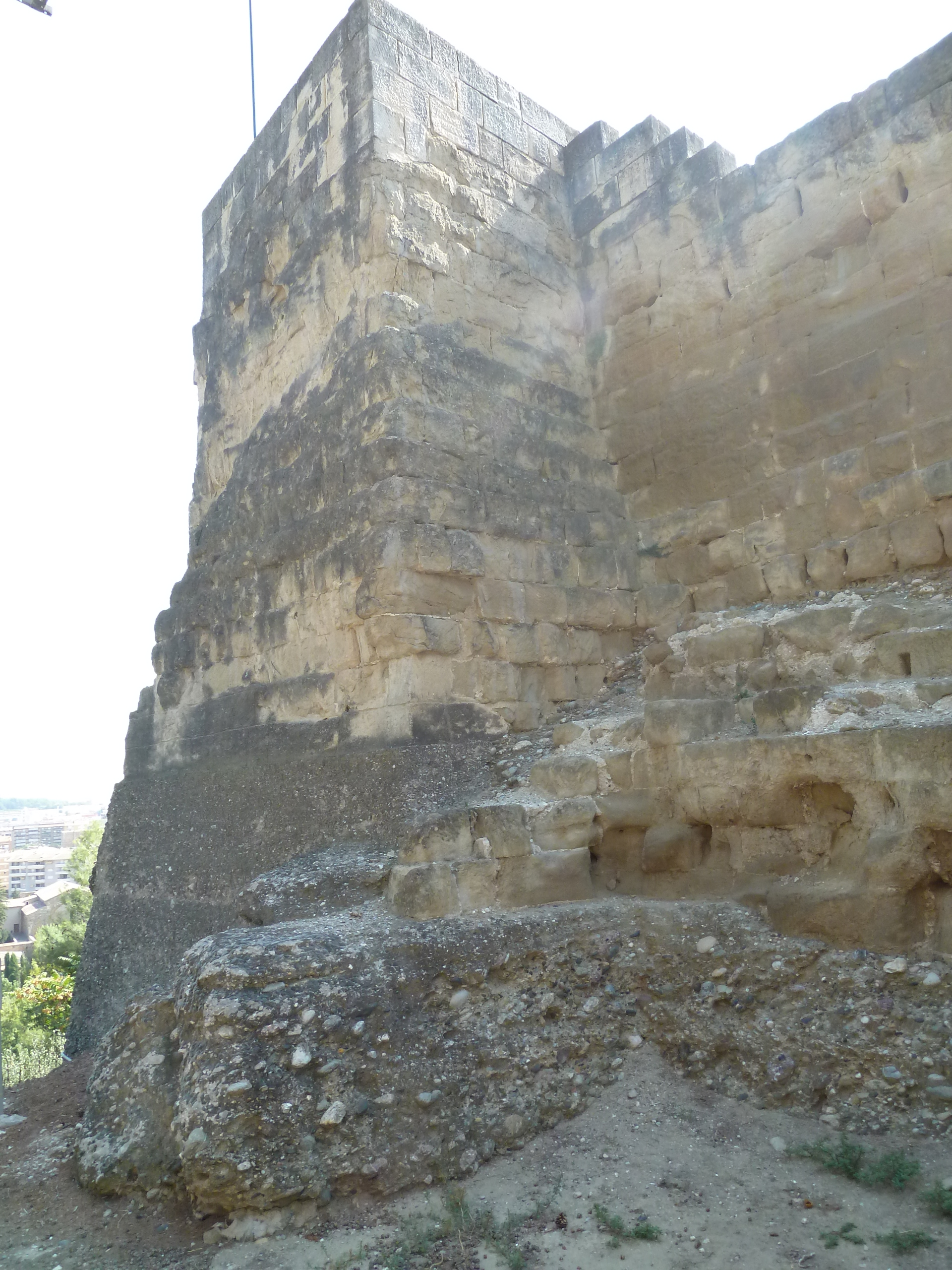
The Ḥiṣn (Arabic: حصن) Balagî, strategically located on a peak overlooking the Segre river and dominating the area, was constructed between 897 and 898 by Lubb ibn Muhammad to strengthen the defense of the march against Christian raids.

From his base of Larida, Lubb ibn Muhammad fought constantly against Christian nobles from Aragon and Catalan counties, who were slowly expanding south and repopulating the extensive areas south of the Pyrenees, and frequent in Christian and Muslim raids and counter-raids ensued. In this context, Lubb ordered the fortification of several towns, such as Larida, where he constructed its As-Sudd (Arabic: السد) or Al-Qaṣabah, also called "Castell del Rei", some time after the Christian conquest, as well as Monzón and Balaguer, constructing its famous Ḥiṣn Balagî or "Castell Formós". He also ordered the construction of the jama masjid (congregational mosque) (Arabic: مسجد الجامع, Masjid al-Jāmiʿ) of Larida, on the grounds of the modern-day Seu Vella.

=== Death of Wilfred the Hairy ===
In 897, Lubb attacked the county of Barcelona, and his army mortally wounded the count Wilfred the Hairy, who died later on August 11 from his injuries, probably not too far away from the castle of Aura.

=== Conquests in other Muslim territories ===
Lubb's forces seized Tudela and Tarazona (899), attacked Alava and temporarily conquered Toledo. They even went as far as Jaén's countryside, which they left ravaged.

=== Raid in Pallars ===
In another raid in 904, Lubb's forces clashed with those of Raymond I of Pallars, achieving the greatest extent of Lubb's domains. His forces then ravaged and plundered Pallars, killing some 700 people and taking about 1000 captives, among them the count's own son, Isarn.

However, in 905 his ally Fortún Garcés of Pamplona was deposed by Sancho I of Navarre, nephew of the count of Pallars. In 907, Lubb ibn Muhammad tried to help Fortún by attacking Pamplona, but the results of the expedition were disastrous. Soon after, Lubb fell into an ambush prepared by Sancho, and was assassinated.

=== Loss of Larida ===
With Lubb's death, the wali of Huesca and longtime rival of Lubb and his father, Muhammad al-Tawil, made himself wali of Larida, ejecting Lubb's son, Furtun ibn Lubb.
