= Raid of 904 in Pallars and Ribagorza =

Coordinates: 42.3590°N 0.8821°E

Raid of 904
- Part of the Reconquista
- Catalan Counties in the late 8th-12th Centuries
Date	904
Location	Counties of Pallars and Ribagorza
Result	Córdoban victory

Belligerents
County of Pallars–Ribagorza	Emirate of Córdoba; Banu Qasi

Commanders and leaders
Raymond I, Count of Pallars and Ribagorza	Walī Lubb ibn Muhammad

The Raid of 904 (Arabic: الغزو سنة ٢٩١, Al-Ġazw sana 291; in Catalan, Ràtzia de 904) was a military campaign (غزو, ġazw) of the Emirate of Córdoba against the counties of Pallars and Ribagorza.

== Background ==
In August 872, Bernard of Gothia was assassinated by a vassal of Bernard Plantapilosa, and Oliba II was reinstated at the head of the counties of Carcassona and Rasés, while Plantapilosa governed Toulouse and Limoges. Pallars and Ribagorza escaped his control, since the supporters of the assassinated count founded a new dynasty started by Count Raymond I of Pallars and Ribagorza.

In 897, Lubb ibn Muhammad ibn Lubb Al-Qasawi attacked the county of Barcenona, killing count Wilfred on the battlefield, on August 11 of that year. Soon after, his army seized Tutila, Tarasuna, Al-Lawa, Tulaytula and ravaged Jaiyan's countryside.

== Raid of 904 ==
In 904, Lubb ibn Muhammad departed from Madīnat Balagî with his army, in order to confront Raymond I of Pallars and Ribagorza; successfully seizing the castles of Sarroca de Bellera, Castissent and Mola de Baró, achieving the greatest extension of his domains. His forces ravaged and plundered the entire Pyrenean county, killing some 700 people and taking about 1,000 war captives—among them the count's own son, Isarn.

== Consequences ==
In 905, his ally Fortún Garcés was deposed by Sancho I of Navarre (with the help of the count of Pallars). In 907, Lubb ibn Muhammad tried to help Fortún by attacking Pamplona, but the results of the expedition were disastrous. Soon after, Lubb fell in an ambush prepared by Sancho of Navarre, and was assassinated.

Isarn, who was held captive in Tutila, was released in 918.
