= Battle of Albelda =

The Battle of Albelda may refer to either of two battles of the Reconquista:

- Battle of Albelda (851), between Gascons and Muslims
- Battle of Monte Laturce (859), between Asturians and Muslims
