= Banu Qasi =

Medieval Hispano-Roman Muslim dynasty in Iberia

Banu Qasi بنو قسي
- 714–929
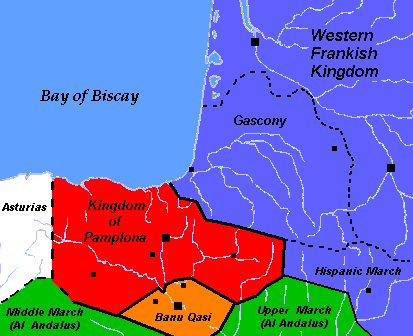
- The Banu Qasi domain and its rival, the Kingdom of Pamplona, in the 10th century, after they were deprived of most of the Upper March
- Capital: Tudela (714–802; 886–898); Zaragoza (802–886; 898–927)
- Common languages: Andalusian Arabic, Latin, Ibero-Romance
- Religion: Islam, Roman Catholicism (Mozarabic Rite)
- Government: Monarchy
  - 713/714–715: Cassius
  - 789–862: Musa ibn Musa
- History
  - Conversion of Count Cassius to Islam: 714
  - Conquest by Cordoba and Navarre: 929
Preceded by	Succeeded by
Basques	Taifa of Zaragoza; Kingdom of Navarre
- Today part of: Spain

The Banu Qasi, Banu Kasi, Beni Casi (Arabic: بني قسي or بنو قسي, meaning "sons" or "heirs of Cassius"), Banu Musa, or al-Qasawi were a Muladí (local convert) dynasty that in the 9th century ruled the Upper March, a frontier territory of the Umayyad Emirate of Córdoba, located on the upper Ebro Valley. At their height in the 850s, family head Musa ibn Musa al-Qasawi was so powerful and autonomous that he would be called 'The Third Monarch of Hispania'. In the first half of the 10th century, an intra-family succession squabble, rebellions and rivalries with competing families, in the face of vigorous monarchs to the north and south, led to the sequential loss of all of their land.

== Dynastic beginnings ==
The family is said to descend from the Hispano-Roman nobleman named Cassius. Muslim chronicles and the Chronicle of Alfonso III suggest he was a Visigoth. (Note: "Curiously, there has always been a great degree of insistence on defining the Banu Qasi as being of Gothic background, when there is no member of the family actually bearing any Gothic name. All Muslim authors make them to appear descending from the Visigothic Count Cassius, whose name, as well as those of many of his descendants, is Latin: Fortunius, Lupus, etc. Whence we must therefore come to deduce that the roots of this lineage are obviously Hispano-Roman.") According to the 10th century Muwallad historian, Ibn al-Qūṭiyya, Count Cassius converted to Islam in 714 as the mawlā (client) of the Umayyads, shortly after their conquest of Hispania. (Note: This origin legend, as recounted by Ibn al-Qūṭiyya, may be a product of the spurious antiquarianism of the latter Umayyad period that satisfied the need for stories which bridged the conquest, rather than reliable genealogy.) After his conversion, he is said to have traveled to Damascus to personally swear allegiance to the Umayyad Caliph, Al-Walid I.

Under the Banu Qasi, the region of Upper Ebro (modern districts of Logroño and southern Navarre, based in Tudela) formed a semi-autonomous principality. The tiny emirate was faced by enemies in several directions. Although never realized, the threat of Frankish attempts to regain control over the western Pyrenees was a real one. In actuality, even more menacing was the gradual eastwards expansion of the Asturian Kingdom; while in the south lay the Caliphate of Córdoba, ever anxious to impose its authority over the frontier regions.

As a local Muslim dynasty in the Ebro valley (the Upper March of Al-Andalus; Arabic: الثغر الأعلى, Aṯ-Ṯaḡr al-Aʿlà), the Banu Qasi were nominally clients of the emirate, but they thrived on regional rivalries and alliances with other Muwallad dynasties of the Upper March, the Vascon tribal chieftains of Pamplona and Aragon, as well as with the Catalan counts of Pallars-Ribagorza to the north and Barcelona to the east, the Kingdom of Asturias to the west and the Umayyads to the south over the next two centuries. They frequently intermarried with other regional nobility, both Muslim and Christian. Musa ibn Musa and the Pamplona king Íñigo Arista were maternal half-brothers, while Musa also married Arista's daughter, and his own daughter and nieces were married to other Pyrenean princes. The cultural ambivalence of the Banu Qasi is also demonstrated by their mixed use of names: for example, Arabic (Muhammad, Musa, Abd Allah), Latinate (Awriya, Furtun, Lubb), and Basque (Garshiya).

The Umayyads of Cordova sanctioned the rule of the Banu Qasi and repeatedly granted them autonomy by appointing them as governors, only to replace them as they expressed too much independence, or launch punitive military expeditions into the region. Such acts on the part of the Umayyads demonstrated their failure to ever fully resolve the problem of effective, central control of outlying regions.

== First rise to prominence ==
The speculated homeland of Count Cassius was a narrow strip across the Ebro from Tudela. The Arab historian Ibn Hazm listed the sons of Count Cassius as Furtun, Abu Tawr, Abu Salama, Yunus and Yahya. Of these, it has been suggested that the second may be the Abu Tawr, Wali of Huesca, who invited Charlemagne to Zaragoza in 778. Likewise, the Banu Salama, removed from power in Huesca and Barbitanya (the area of Barbastro) at the end of the 8th century, may have derived from Abu Salama. Subsequent leaders of the family descend from the eldest son, Furtun. (Note: This is as the pedigree appears in the work of Ibn Hazm, but historian Al-Udri refers to his descendant as Muhammad ibn Lubb ibn Muhammad ibn Lubb ibn Musa ibn Musa ibn Furtun ibn Garshiya (Muhammad son of Lubb, son of . . . son of Musa, son of Furtun, son of Garshiya). This last patronymic may simply be an error for ibn Qasi (son of Cassius), or may suggest that Ibn Hazm has dropped a generation, Garshiya, between Cassius and Furtun in his account of the senior line. An additional generation would better fit the chronology.) His son, Musa ibn Furtun ibn Qasi, first garnered notice in 788, when on behalf of emir Hisham I of Córdoba he put down the rebellion of the Banu Husain in Zaragoza. The fate of Musa ibn Furtun is debated. An account of the 788 rebellion tells of Musa's murder shortly thereafter at the hands of a Banu Husain follower, yet a "Furtun ibn Musa" is said to have been killed in his own 802 Zaragoza uprising, and it has been suggested that this name may be an error for Musa ibn Furtun. However, Ibn Hayyan also reports a Furtun 'the Lame' al-Qasawi (of the Banu Qasi) forming a coalition with Pamplona, Álava, Castile, Amaya and Cerdanya to fight against Amrus ibn Yusuf at this time, suggesting that this is instead a son of Musa ibn Furtun overlooked by Ibn Hazm, whose genealogy provides most of what we know about the clan. (Note: Historian Jesús Lorenzo Jiménez stresses the fact that part of Ibn Hayyan's al-Muqtabis that refers to the events that took place in Pamplona was published for the first time in 1954 whereas the part which mentions the uprisings in Huesca and Zaragoza did not come to light until 1999/2001. Therefore, Cañada Juste and other historians did not have access to the most recently published work.)

In the next generation, Mutarrif ibn Musa, was likely a son of Musa ibn Furtun, (Note: Several Iberian historians have attempted to harmonize the difficulties with the pedigree though the insertion of two generations, making a first Musa ibn Furtun, murdered 788 the father of Mutarrif ibn Musa of 798 and Furtun ibn Musa of 802, the latter in turn father of an otherwise undocumented Musa ibn Furtun, father of Musa ibn Musa.) although historian Ibn Hayyan only mentions his name and does not say that he was a member of the Banu Qasi clan. According to Ibn Hayyan, "in (183 H: 799-800) the people of Pamplona deceived Mutarrif ibn Musa and killed him". "This is perhaps one of the most quoted paragraphs by historians who on the basis of this brief news, have woven a complex web of relationships involving the Banu Qasi, the Arista and the Carolingians". Évariste Lévi-Provençal was the first to say that "Pamplona, the capital of Vasconia, had not been governed by the Muslims since 798 (...) and that its inhabitants had killed the representative of the Umayyad authorities, Mutarrif ben Musa Ben Qasi, and had chosen one of their own, named Velasco." This Velasco would be the same "enemy of God, Balashk al-Yalashqi, Lord of Pamplona", a pro-Carolingian against whom the Muslims launched a military campaign in 816. Spanish historian Claudio Sánchez Albornoz did not agree with this interpretation and believed that it had been the people of Pamplona, without any outside intervention, who took matters in their own hands. Nowhere does Ibn Hayyan mention that Mutarrif ibn Musa was the governor of Pamplona or that Velasco was pro-Carolingian.

It was Musa's son Musa ibn Musa al-Qasawi whose rule brought the family to the peak of its power.

Early generations of Banu Qasi

Ibn Hazm pedigree	Modern reconstruction
Qasi fl. 714	Cassius fl. 714
(sons or descendants)
Furtun b. bef. 714	(perhaps)	(perhaps)
Furtun ibn Qasi	Abu Tawr	Abu Salama	others	Abu Taur of Huesca fl. 778	ancestor of Banu Salama clan
Musa ibn Furtun k. 788
Musa ibn Furtun	Zahir ibn Furtun	Mutarriff ibn Musa k. 798/9	Furtun ibn Musa k. 802
Musa ibn Furtun	Zahir ibn Furtun
Musa ibn Musa d. 862	Yusuf ibn Musa	others	Musa ibn Musa d. 862	Maymuna bint Zahir

== Musa ibn Musa ==
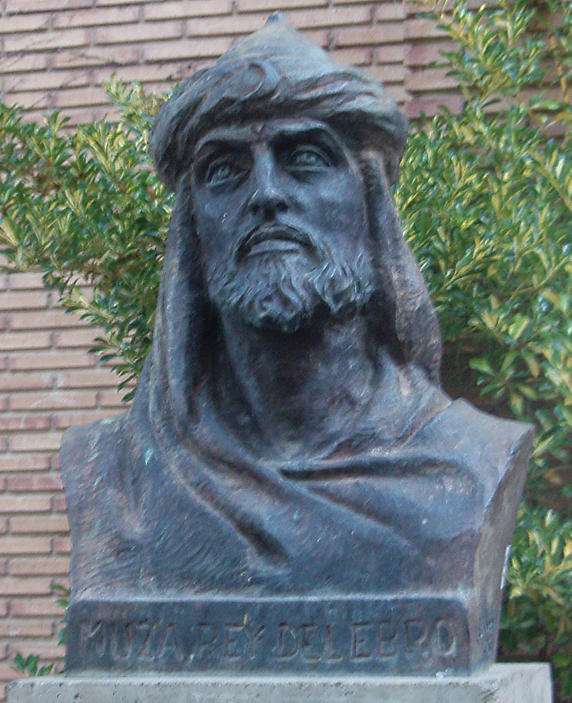
Bust honouring Musa ibn Musa in Tudela, Navarre.

Besides the Arab sources, Musa ibn Musa is mentioned in three Latin texts: the Chronica Adefonsi tertii regis; the Albendensis; and the Códice de Roda. The latter mentions his family relations as the half-brother and son-in-law of King Íñigo Arista and the properties he held. The Albeldensis describes the Battle of Monte Laturce, also referred to as the second Battle of Albelda, whereas the Chronicle of Alfonso III provides a more detailed account of his life and feats.

While Musa had been orphaned at an early age, his military activity may have begun in the 820s, and the Banu Qasi (possibly Musa himself) most probably participated in the second battle of the pass of Roncevaux along with their relatives of Pamplona, an event leading to the establishment of the kingdom of Pamplona. Historians agree that in the 840s, after the expulsion from his lands of a kinsman, 'Abd al-Jabbar al-Qasawi, Musa launched a series of revolts in conjunction with his maternal half-brother, Íñigo Arista of Pamplona. Abd ar-Rahman II defeated them, and took Musa's son Lubb hostage. Musa repeatedly submitted, only to rise again. After repeated rebellions he controlled a region along the Ebro from Borja to Logroño, including Tudela, Tarazona, Arnedo and Calahorra. The 851/2 deaths of Íñigo Arista and Abd ar-Rahman II, as well as a victory over Christian forces at Albelda, gave Musa unprecedented status. The new emir, Muhammad I of Córdoba named Musa the Wali of Zaragoza and governor of the Upper March. Over the next decade Musa expanded the family's lands to include Zaragoza, Najera, Viguera and Calatayud, while also governing Tudela, Huesca and Toledo, and according to the Chronica Adefonsi tertii regis, Musa had his followers call him "the third king of Spaniae". (Note: tertium regem in Spania appellare precepit.)

Throughout this period, as reported by Ibn Hazm, Musa was also involved in a struggle within his family. Musa's brother Yunus ibn Musa is said to have remained loyal to Córdoba, and joined with the sons of their uncle Zahir ibn Furtun to fight Musa over a period of about 30 years. Ibn Hazm reports that Yunus had descendants, but provides no further details.

In 859, Ordoño I of Asturias and García Íñiguez of Pamplona joined forces to deal Musa a crushing defeat at Albelda, which passed into Christian legend as the Battle of Clavijo. Emir Muhammad then stripped Musa of his titles and restored direct Cordoban control over the region. Musa died in 862 of wounds received in a petty squabble with a son-in-law, and the family disappeared from the political scene for a decade.

== Sons of Musa ==
Following the 862 death of Musa, nothing is known of the family until 871. It is presumed that the members of the family associated with the Cordoban court and military campaigns, but no record of their presence there survives. According to the Chronica Adefonsi tertii regis, upon learning of his father's defeat at Albelda, his son Lubb ibn Musa ibn Musa with all his men, submitted themselves to the rule of the Asturian king Ordoño and became his lifelong subjects. By the time the Banu Qasi reappear, they had lost control of most of their lands, being left with just a small area surrounding Arnedo. In 870, a rebellion in Huesca initiated a chain of events that would bring the Banu Qasi back to dominance. In that year, Amrus ibn Umar of the Banu Amrus assassinated the amil Musa ibn Galind, thought to have been son of the Córdoba-resident brother of Pamplona king García Íñiguez. The Amir, Muhammad, sent an army to the north, but Amrus allied himself with García, and the Cordoban general, Abd al-Gafir ibn Abd al-Aziz, was killed before the gates of Zaragoza. The Banu Qasi sons of Musa, apparently under the leadership of eldest son Lubb ibn Musa, then allied themselves with García, and reestablished control over their father's possessions. First, the residents of Huesca called on Mutarrif ibn Musa al-Qasawi for leadership. In January 872, Isma'il ibn Musa entered Zaragoza, and was there joined by Lubb, the two of them together taking Monzon. Isma'il also allied himself with the Banu Jalaf of Barbitanya, marrying Sayyida, daughter of Abd Allah ibn Jalaf. Furtun ibn Musa occupied Tudela, whose governor the Banu Qasi imprisoned at Arnedo, then killed following an escape. Lubb also occupied and refortified Viguera.

The immediate response of emir Muhammad was to try to limit the expansion of the Banu Qasi by installing a rival dynasty, the Arab Banu Tujib, in Calatayud, the one part of their father's possessions not reclaimed. In the next year, 873, Muhammad launched a campaign against the various northern rebels. He first bought off the rebels of Toledo with governorships, and this encouraged Amrus to offer his loyalty, for which he was rewarded with Huesca where he captured Mutarrif and his family, including wife Belasquita, the daughter of García Íñiguez of Pamplona. In spite of a desperate attack by the combined troops of his brothers, Mutarrif and three sons, Muhammad, Musa and Lubb, were taken to Córdoba and crucified. (Note: Two of Mutarrif's remaining sons, 'Abd Allah and Isma'il, fled north and converted to Christianity.) The next year, Furtun died in Tudela, while Lubb was killed in an accident in Viguera in 875. This left control of the family in the hands of two men, the remaining brother Isma'il ibn Musa in Monzon, and Lubb's son, Muhammad ibn Lubb al-Qasawi, who is first known as a defender of Zaragoza against the emirate troops.

== Muhammad ibn Lubb ==
Over the next decade, following the deaths of his father and two uncles, Muhammad ibn Lubb maneuvered to become the leader of the family. He resisted 879 and 882 campaigns from Córdoba. The latter was under the general Hashim ibn Abd al-Aziz, and Muhammad tried to persuade Hashim to unite with him against the Asturians, now ruled by Alfonso III. The earlier hostage-taking done by all parties, greatly complicated such situation. Hashim did not want to antagonize Alfonso, who was holding his son as a hostage. Hashim himself held a son of Isma'il ibn Musa, and he sent his captive and other gifts to Alfonso in return for his son. Muhammad would later ally himself with the kings of Pamplona and Asturias, and it was apparently he who raised the future Ordoño II of León at his court. The struggle for power within the Banu Qasi family came to a head in 882, when Muhammad fought, near Calahorra, a 7000-man force of his uncle Isma'il ibn Musa, and Isma'il ibn Furtun, a son of his uncle Furtun. In the following internecine squabbles, Furtun's four sons were killed and Isma'il ibn Musa was forced to retreat to Monzon. From there he rebuilt Lleida and routed an army sent by Wilfred of Barcelona. Muhammad ibn Lubb, now the clear head of the family, was left in control of the majority of the Banu Qasi lands. In 884, the emir sent two military campaigns into the region and took Zaragoza, although chronicler Ibn Hayyan reports that Muhammad ibn Lubb had sold the city to count Raymond I of Pallars and Ribagorza prior to its fall. This resulted in a consolidated Banu Qasi powerbase around Arnedo, Borja, Calahorra and Viguera, with Isma'il holding an enclave to the east, around Monzon and Lleida.

In 885 and 886, Muhammad launched attacks against Castile, in the first apparently killing count Diego Rodríguez Porcelos, while the second was an attack on Álava in which many Christians were killed. The latter year also saw the death of emir Muhammad I of Córdoba. Muhammad ibn Lubb tested his power against the new emirs, and they responded by again trying to balance Banu Qasi power in the region, giving Zaragoza to the rival Tujibids, and Huesca to Muhammad ibn Abd al-Malik al-Tawil of the Muwallad Banu Shabrit clan. The latter was shortly challenged by Isma'il ibn Musa, whose sons fought a battle against al-Tawil's troops, Musa ibn Isma'il being killed and his brother Mutarrif captured. Isma'il died shortly thereafter, in 889, and al-Tawil and Muhammad ibn Lubb each took their case to emir Abd Allah for possession of Isma'il's lands, the emir confirming the succession of Muhammad ibn Lubb. There followed a period of relative peace and collaboration between Muhammad ibn Lubb and al-Tawil. In 891, Muhammad defeated a Christian force at Castro Sibiriano, but he dedicated most of his efforts in his final years against Tujibid Zaragoza, initiating what would become a 17-year siege. In 897, the citizens of Toledo rose up and offered their city to Muhammad, but being occupied with Zaragoza, he sent his son Lubb. Muhammad was reconnoitering Zaragoza in 898, when on 8 October, he was caught by a guard who spitted him on a lance. His head was presented to the Tujibids, who sent it to Córdoba, where it was displayed in front of the palace for eight days before being buried with the honors due a brave foe.

== Lubb ibn Muhammad ==
Muhammad's son, Lubb ibn Muhammad al-Qasawi, was born in 870, and was already active at the time of his father's death. In 896, he was refortifying Monzon when al-Tawil of Huesca tried his luck. Though being attacked by a larger, better equipped army, Lubb was able to rout al-Tawil's men, taking his brother prisoner. In January 897 he went to Toledo to take up the leadership offer the citizens had made his father. Back in the east, he launched an attack on Aura that led to the death of Wilfred of Barcelona. Returning through Toledo in 898, he next marched to Jaén, with the intent of forming a coalition with another rebel, Umar ibn Hafsun, but before Umar reached Jaén, the news of his father's death at Zaragoza forced Lubb's return to Tudela, where he formally recognized the sovereignty of the emir, Abd Allah, in exchange for the formal governorship over Tudela and Tarazona. His return north found al-Tawil moving to take advantage of the temporary power vacuum and three weeks after his father's death, Lubb captured the Huesca ruler in a skirmish. To buy his freedom, al-Tawil ceded lands between Huesca and Monzon to Lubb, and agreed to pay 100,000 gold dinares for the possession of Huesca. Paying 50,000 immediately, he gave his son Abd al-Malik and daughter Sayyida as hostages to ensure payment of the second half. Lubb would relent, forgiving the remaining debt and returning the hostages except Sayyida, whom he married. (Note: Lubb thus also linked himself with the Galindo Aznar, Count of Aragon, whose sister was the girl's mother.)

Lubb ibn Muhammad continued his father's siege of Zaragoza, but found himself drawn in other directions. Perhaps in 900, Alfonso III, in conjunction with Fortún Garcés of Pamplona, launched a raid against Tarazona, in Lubb's realms; which he successfully blocked. Then in 903, Toledo again rebelled against Cordova, asking Lubb to take control. He sent his brother Mutarrif, who was proclaimed their Amir. Mutarrif's fate is unknown, but by 906, he had been replaced by Lubb's kinsman, Muhammad ibn Isma'il, son of Isma'il ibn Musa, who was then assassinated. (Note: His son Lubb ibn Muhammad ibn Isma'il al-Qasawi fled to join the Fatimids, taking the Banu Qasi line into Africa.) Alfonso again attacked Lubb's lands, laying siege to Grañón, but was forced to lift the siege when Lubb moved with an army toward Alava. This threat neutralized, Lubb turned toward Pallars, ravaging the lands, killing hundreds and taking a thousand captives, including Isarn, Count Raymond's son, who was kept in Tudela for a decade before being freed.

In 905, a coalition of the King of Asturias, the counts of Aragon and Pallars, and, it is sometimes claimed, Lubb ibn Muhammad, engineered a coup in Navarre that brought Sancho Garcés to the throne in place of Fortún Garcés. Two years later, Lubb launched an attack on Pamplona and fought at "Liédena" on 30 September 907, resulting in a total rout of the Banu Qasi forces, while Lubb was killed. The transcendent battle marked a permanent change in the regional balance, Sancho's Pamplona becoming a major regional power, while it initiated the final decline of the Banu Qasi.

== Decline (905–929) ==
With the fall of Lubb, his local rivals immediately fell upon the Banu Qasi lands. Sancho descended toward Calahorra. The Tujibids finally broke the siege of Zaragoza and captured Ejea. Al-Tawil retook the lands he had lost, and proceeded to overrun the family's eastern enclave, taking Barbastro and Lleida. Monzon was briefly controlled by Lubb's brother Yunus ibn Muhammad, but he could not hold it, and Monzon too fell to the al-Tawil. In the reduced western lands, Lubb was succeeded by brother Abd Allah ibn Muhammad al-Qasawi. In 911, Abd Allah and al-Tawil jointly, along with al-Tawil's brother-in-law Galindo Aznárez II of Aragon, attacked Pamplona. After destroying several castles, they developed cold feet and withdrew, but were caught by Sancho. Al-Tawil defected and escaped, while Galindo was crushed and forced to recognize Sancho as feudal sovereign, ending the autonomy of the Aragon. Arab sources describe Abd Allah's rear-guard action at Luesia as a victory, but if so it was only a tactical victory and he immediately retreated south. In 914, Sancho turned the tables, marching into the heart of the Banu Qasi homeland, taking Arnedo and attacking Calahorra. In the next year, 915, Sancho turned toward Tudela, and there captured Abd Allah, killing a thousand of his best men. Mutarrif ibn Muhammad al-Qasawi, Abd Allah's brother, rushed to relieve the city, and Abd Allah was ransomed, his daughter Urraca and probably son Furtun ibn Abd Allah being given as hostages. (Note: Both would later convert, Urraca marrying Fruela II of León.) However, two months later Abd Allah was assassinated, it is said, through the machinations of Sancho.

The only bright spot for the family in this period happened in the east. In 913, Muhammad ibn Abd al-Malik al-Tawil died, and the next year, the residents of Monzon rejected his son Amrus ibn Muhammad, and invited the Banu Qasi to return in the person of Muhammad ibn Lubb, son of Lubb ibn Muhammad. After a brief siege, he was able to reclaim the city for his family, as well as Lleida.

In the west, Mutarrif ibn Muhammad and his nephew Muhammad ibn Abd Allah struggled for dominance. The latter proved victorious, killing Mutarrif in 916. Since the death of Lubb in 907, the Banu Qasi had been left fractured and weakened in the face of two resurgent powers: to the north and west, a collaboration between the new king of León, Ordoño II, and Sancho I of Navarre brought a strong army south, ravaging the Banu Qasi lands around Viguera, Najera and Tudela in 918, while the young and energetic Abd ar-Rahman III, who was to temporarily reverse the centrifugal forces at work in the Emirate, soon to be Caliphate of Córdoba, sent armies north, routing the Christians. The next year, both Banu Qasi leaders, Muhammad ibn Abd Allah and Muhammad ibn Lubb, attacked the Banu al-Tawil at Barbastro, but Sancho took advantage of this, and allying himself with his cousin Bernard I of Ribagorza and the Banu al-Tawil, he attacked and burned Monzon, which was hence lost to the Banu Qasi.

In 920, the emir, Abd ar-Rahman III, personally led the Cordoban army north, and forced Sancho to abandon fortifications he had been building. After some maneuvering the emir met the armies of Ordoño and Sancho, and defeated them at Valdejunquera. In 923, the Christian allies brought another force south, and while Muhammad ibn Abd Allah formed a coalition of local nobles to resist it, their armies were dispersed and Viguera and Najera fell. Like his father, Muhammad was captured, then assassinated on Sancho's orders, and when Abd ar-Rahman launched another punitive campaign the next year, on his return to Tudela he removed the Banu Qasi and sent them to Córdoba, placing their old rivals the Tujibids of Zaragoza in their place. After 923, only the eastern enclave encompassing Lleida and the husûn of Balaguer, Barbastro and Ayera were in the hands of the family. However, one by one these expelled Muhammad ibn Lubb and turned to the Tujibids for leadership, leaving him only Ayera in 928, when Jimeno Garcés, the new king of Navarre, intervened on his behalf in opposition to Hasim ibn Muhammad al-Tujibi. The next year, Muhammad fell victim to an ambush and was killed by his brother-in-law, a son of Raymond of Pallars.

Later generations of Banu Qasi

Musa ibn Musa d. 862
Lubb ibn Musa d. 875	Mutarrif ibn Musa cruc. 873 Córdoba	daughter	Azraq ibn Mantil	Furtun ibn Musa d. 874	Isma'il ibn Musa d. 889	Awriya bint Musa	García † Monte Laturce 859
Muhammad ibn Lubb k. 898	2 other sons	3 sons cruc. 873 Córdoba	Yusuf ibn Mutarrif k. Najerra	'Abd Allah ibn Mutarrif converted	Isma'il ibn Mutarrif converted	4 sons k. by Muhammad ibn Lubb	Muhammad ibn Isma'il k. Toledo	Musa ibn Isma'il k. 889 Huesca	Sa'id ibn Isma'il k. Córdoba	Musa ibn Garsiya
Lubb ibn Muhammad k. 907	2 other sons	'Abd Allah ibn Muhammad k. 915	Yunis ibn Muhammad	Mutarrif ibn Muhammad k. 916 by Muhammad ibn 'Abd Allah	Lubb ibn Muhammad fled to Fatimids in Maghreb
'Abd Allah ibn Lubb k. by Mutarrif ibn Muhammad	Muhammad ibn Lubb † 929	Furtun ibn Lubb converted	Muhammad ibn 'Abd Allah k. 923	Musa ibn 'Abd Allah murdered	Furtun ibn 'Abd Allah converted	'Abd Allah ibn 'Abd Allah drowned in Tagus	Urraca bint 'Abd Allah converted	Fruela II of Asturias
Lubb ibn Muhammad	Ordoño	Ramiro

== Legacy ==
The death of Muhammad ibn Lubb marked the end of the Banu Qasi in the Ebro valley. Their rivals the Tujibids would follow their model, making an independent peace with Leon in 937, a move that resulted in a punitive expedition from the Caliph similar to those of prior years against the Banu Qasi. The Tujibids would eventually establish a full-fledged Taifa kingdom centered at Zaragoza.

Two other Taifa crowns were ruled by men with names reminiscent of the Banu Qasi and are claimed as dynastic members, although there is no evidence of any actual genealogical connection. A small Taifa state at Alpuente was founded by Abd Allah ibn Qasim. He was of a convert family that claimed a tribal affiliation with the Yamanī/Fíhrī. In 1144, another Christian convert and Sufi mystic from Silves, Abu-l-Qasim Ahmad ibn al-Husayn ibn Qasi, called Ibn Qasi, rose and established a Taifa state at Mértola, expanding it to much of southern Portugal, and he encouraged the successful move of the Almohads (to whom he would submit) against Seville. They fell out and Ibn Qasi was assassinated in 1151 by his own men.;

== Leadership of the Banu Qasi ==
The following men are the documented leaders of the Banu Qasi (entries in italics are of uncertain affiliation to the family):

- Cassius, fl. 714
  - Abu Tawr, Wali of Huesca, fl. 778, perhaps son of Cassius
- Musa ibn Furtun, grandson of Cassius
  - Mutarrif ibn Musa, assassinated 799, perhaps son of Musa ibn Furtun
  - Furtun ibn Musa, killed in rebellion 801, perhaps son of Musa ibn Furtun, else identical to him
- Musa ibn Musa, d. 862, son of Musa ibn Furtun
- Lubb ibn Musa, d. 875, son of Musa ibn Musa
- Isma'il ibn Musa, co-leader to 882, d. 889, son of Musa ibn Musa
- Muhammad ibn Lubb, co-leader to 882, then sole leader, d. 899, son of Lubb ibn Musa
- Lubb ibn Muhammad, d. 907, son of Muhammad ibn Lubb
- Abd Allah ibn Muhammad, d. 915, son of Muhammad ibn Lubb

(succession struggle between Mutarrif ibn Muhammad and Muhammad ibn Abd Allah, 915-916)

- Muhammad ibn Abd Allah, d. 923, son of Abd Allah ibn Muhammad
- Muhammad ibn Lubb, d. 929, son of Lubb ibn Muhammad

(end of dynasty)

== Bibliography ==
- Ball, Warwick (2009). Out of Arabia: Phoenicians, Arabs, and the discovery of Europe. London: East & West Publishing. ISBN 978-1-907318-00-9.
- Cañada Juste, Alberto (1977). "El posible solar originario de los Banu Qasi". Homenaje a don José Mº Lacarra (in Spanish). Vol. Separata. Zaragoza: Anubar. pp. 33–38. OCLC 890628623.
- Cañada Juste, Alberto (1980). "Los Banu Qasi (714-924)". Príncipe de Viana (in Spanish) (41): 5–95. ISSN 0032-8472.
- Catlos, Brian A. (2004). The Victors and the Vanquished: Christians and Muslims of the Ebro Valley (eleventh to thirteenth centuries). ISBN 061250056X.
- Collins, Roger (1990). The Basques. Oxford, UK: Basil Blackwell. ISBN 0-631-17565-2.
- Fletcher, Richard A. (2006). Moorish Spain. Berkeley: University of California Press. ISBN 9780520248403.
- Fletcher, Richard A. (1991). The Quest for El Cid. New York: Oxford University Press. ISBN 0195069552.
- Fouracre, Paul; McKitterick, Rosamond; et al., eds. (2005). The New Cambridge Medieval History. Cambridge: Cambridge University Press. ISBN 9780521362917.
- Granja, Fernando de la (1967). "La Marca Superior en la Obra de al-'Udrí". Estudios de Edad Media de la Corona de Aragon (in Spanish). 8: 457–545.
- Kennedy, Hugh N. (1996). Muslim Spain and Portugal: A Political History of Al-Andalus. London; New York: Longman. ISBN 9780582495159.
- Lorenzo Jiménez, Jesús (2010). La dawla de los Banū Qasī: origen, auge y caída de una dinastía muladí en la frontera superior de Al-Ándalus (in Spanish). Madrid: Consejo Superior de Investigaciones Científicas. ISBN 978-84-00-09164-4.
- Martínez Díez, Gonzalo (2005). El Condado de Castilla (711-1038): la historia frente a la leyenda (in Spanish). Vol. I. Valladolid: Marcial Pons Historia. ISBN 84-9718-276-6.
- Watt, William Montgomery; Cachia, Pierre (1996). A History of Islamic Spain. Edinburgh: Edingurgh University Press. ISBN 0748608478.
- O'Callaghan, Joseph F. (1983). A History of Medieval Spain. Cambridge: Cornell University Press. ISBN 0-8014-9264-5.
- Reilly, Bernard F. (1998). The Kingdom of León-Castilla Under King Alfonso VII, 1126-1157. Philadelphia: University of Pennsylvania Press. ISBN 9780812234527.
- Salazar y Acha, Jaime de (2006). "Urraca. Un nombre egregio en la onomástica altomedieval". En la España medieval (in Spanish) (1): 29–48. ISSN 0214-3038.
