= Count Cassius =

8th century Hispano-Roman nobleman

Count Cassius (fl. 8th century A.D.), also called "Count Casius" (Spanish: Casio; Arabic: قَسِيّ قُومِس, "Qasīy Qūmis"), was a Hispano-Roman nobleman who founded the Banu Qasi dynasty.

His actual existence has been contested on the grounds that embellishing stories related to Gothic ancestry were rather popular during the Caliphate of Cordoba. The name is anachronistic, and no Banu Qasi is attested until Mutarrif ibn Musa during the 780s, but he is identified with just his father's name and not explicitly linked to Cassius or the Banu Qasi. Historians point out that the origins of the Banu Qasi, as recounted by Ibn al-Qutiyya, could be a product of the spurious antiquarianism of the later Umayyad period rather than reliable genealogy, satisfying the need for stories which bridged the conquest.

According to the 10th-century Gothic Muwallad historian Ibn al-Qūṭiyya, Count Cassius converted to Islam in 714, shortly after the Umayyad conquest of Hispania, as a client (mawali) of the Umayyads; his family came to be called the Banu Qasi (بَنُو قَسِيّ, the "sons of Cassius"). Cassius had converted at the hands of the Arab, Hassan ibn Yasar al-Hudhali, qadi in Zaragoza at the time of Abd ar-Rahman's arrival in the peninsula, Cassius joined forces with Musa ibn Nusayr and Tariq ibn Ziyad, and is reported to have travelled to Damascus to personally swear allegiance to the caliph Al-Walid I.

The 11th-century Arab historian Ibn Hazm attributed five sons to Cassius: Fortun, Abu Tawr, Abu Salama, Yunus and Yahya. The Banu Qasi dynasty descended from Fortun, the eldest son; the second son may have been the Abu Taur of Huesca who invited Charlemagne to Zaragoza in 778; and the Banu Salama, a family that ruled Huesca and Barbitanya (Barbastro) in the late tenth century, may have descended from Abu Salama.

At the time of the Muslim arrival and after, Cassius ruled an area comprising Tudela, Tarazona, Borja and, probably, Ejea.

== Bibliography ==
- Cañada Juste, Alberto (1977). "El posible solar originario de los Banu Qasi", in Homenaje a don José M.ª Lacarra..., Zaragoza, I.
- Cañada Juste, Alberto (1977). "Los Banu Qasi (714-924)", in Principe de Viana, vol. 41, pp. 5–95 (1980).
- Collins, Roger (1983). Early Medieval Spain. New York: St. Martin's Press. ISBN 0-312-22464-8.
- Collins, Roger (1994). The Arab Conquest of Spain, 710-797 (Blackwell Publishing).
- Christys, Ann (eds.) (2002) Christians in Al-Andalus, 711-1000, Routledge. ISBN 0-7007-1564-9
- Glick, Thomas F. (eds.) (2005) Islamic and Christian Spain in the Early Middle Ages, BRILL. ISBN 90-04-14771-3
