= Isma'il ibn Musa =

Isma'il ibn Musa (Arabic: إسماعيل بن موسى القسوي) (fl. ca. 850–889) was a Muslim lord in the Upper March (Arabic: الثغر الأعلى, aṯ-Ṯaḡr al-Aʿlà) of al-Andalus, as well as walī of Larida. He hailed from the prominent Muwallad Banu Qasi clan (Arabic: بنو قسي), and was the son of Musa ibn Musa al-Qasawi and his wife Maymuna bint Zahir ibn Furtun, who was Musa's uncle.

For some years, he lived in Córdoba as an hostage-guest of its emir, Muhammad I, being the necessary pledge which guaranteed the Banu Qasi's loyalty to the Emirate of Córdoba. In 850, he was still in Córdoba. Once liberated, he joined the revolt initiated by all his brothers against Muhammad I, to the end of 870, even forming an alliance with the Kingdom of Pamplona and King Alfonso III of Asturias Isma'il seized Zaragoza and Montsó in 872, and about this time formed a marriage alliance, wedding Sayyida, daughter of 'Abd Allah ibn Jalaf, of the Banu Jalaf of Barbitanya. In 882, his own nephew, Muhammad ibn Lubb (loyal to Córdoba), made him prisoner, but he was set free again a short time later.

Having been restored as walī of Larida in 884, Isma'il was attacked at Larida by Wilfred the Hairy, Count of Barcelona, to obstruct the fortification of its walls and its al-qaṣabah (Arabic: القصبة). Isma'il defeated the attacking Barcelona troops and pursued them as far as to the Llobregat valley. In the late 880s, the Banu Qasi challenged the new emir, who established men of other families in what had been Banu Qasi territory to balance their power. The sons of Isma'il fought a battle against one of these, Muhammad al-Tawil of Huesca, in which one son was killed and another captured. Isma'il died 10 October 889.

Because his father controlled Huesca during the approximate period that Nunilo and Alodia are said to have been killed there, it has been suggested that he could be the emir of Huesca, Zumael, who ordered their deaths. Were this the case, he was presumably acting on his father's behalf. However, the precise dating of the martyrdom is disputed, and since nothing is known of the earlier rulers of Huesca and some details of the story seem inconsistent with what is known of the Banu Qasi, Zumael may instead have been an otherwise unknown Cordoba-appointed predecessor of Musa.

Isma'il had three sons: Muhammad, who briefly seized Toledo before being assassinated, leaving a son Lubb about whom nothing further is known; Musa, who was killed in battle against Muhammad al-Tawil at Huesca; and Sa'id, who died at Córdoba.
