= Ibn Hayyan (disambiguation) =

Ibn Hayyan may also refer to:

- Ibn Hayyan, historian from Al Andalus
- Jābir ibn Hayyān or Geber (c. 721–c. 815), Muslim chemist and alchemist, astronomer, astrologer, engineer, philosopher, pharmacist and physician
- Ibn Hayyan (company), one of the SABIC subsidiaries
