= Abu Zafar (disambiguation) =

Abu Zafar or Abu Jafar may refer to:

- Abu Ja'far al-Mansur (714–775), second Abbasid caliph
- Abu Jaʿfar Abdullah al-Maʾmun ibn Harun (786–833), seventh Abbasid caliph
- Abu Jafar Mohammad Ibn Mousa Khwarizmi (780–850), Arab polymath
- Abu Jafar Muhammad ibn Musa ibn Shakir (803–873), Persian scholar
- Abu Jafar Muhammad ibn Jarir al-Tabari (839–923), Persian Sunni Muslim scholar and polymath
- Abu Jafar Al-Tahawi (853–933), Egyptian Arab Hanafi jurist and traditionalist theologian
- Abu Jafar al-Saduq Ibn Babawayh al-Qummi (923–991), Persian Shia Islamic scholar
- Abu Jaʿfar an-Nahhas (died 949), Egyptian Muslim scholar
- Abu Jafar ibn Atiyya (died 1158), Moroccan writer
- Abu Jafar ibn Harun al-Turjali (died 1180), Andalusian physician
- Abu Jafar Shamsuddin (1911–1988), Bangladeshi writer
- Sikandar Abu Zafar (1918–1975), Bangladeshi journalist and poet
- Abu Zafar Obaidullah (1934–2001), Bangladeshi poet and civil servant
- Kazi Abu Zafar Siddique (1940–2012), Bangladeshi recital artist and cultural activist
- Abu Zafar (lyricist) (1943–2024), Bangladeshi lyricist and composer
- Abu Zafar (born 1963), Bangladeshi diplomat
- Abu Jafar Mohammad Moinuddin, Bangladeshi politician
