= Battle of Guadalacete =

852 battle

Coordinates: 39°48′00″N 3°52′12″W

- Part of the Reconquista
- Iberian Peninsula c. 814
Date	852
Location	Toledo, Spain
Result	Umayyad victory

Belligerents
Kingdom of Asturias; Kingdom of Pamplona; Toledo rebels	Emirate of Córdoba

Commanders and leaders
Ordoño I of Asturias; García Íñiguez of Pamplona; Musa ibn Musa; Ibn Balyus	Muhammad I of Córdoba

Casualties and losses
More than 10,000 Christians died in Asturias' army.	

The Battle of Guadalacete was fought in 852 between a coalition of troops from the Kingdom of Asturias and the Kingdom of Pamplona, and a force of troops from the Umayyad Muslim Emirate of Córdoba under the command of Muhammad I of Córdoba. The outcome was a Umayyad victory.

== Context ==
After the death of Emir Abd ar-Rahman II in the year 852, the population in the area around Toledo rose in revolt as they had done on many previous occasions. Their reasons were both internal, such as corrupt governance, and external as they identified more with the Christian kingdoms to the north. They also frequently were harassed by the Mozárabes people who resided in the Muslim borderlands. Hence, the people of Toledo rose in arms, seeking the assistance of the Kingdom of Asturias and Basques as is reported by Ibn Khaldun, quoting verbatim from Spanish-language chronicles of the tenth century:

The people of Toledo asked for the help of the King of Galicia and the King of the Basques, who came to free them with the help of the city's men. The Toledo army formed by the union of the people of Toledo and the Christian kings, saw that of the Emir (very small) and went to the banks of the Rio de Guadalacete and fought with fervor, routing the Emir. He retreated to the lands to the south, followed by the army of Toledo which fell into an ambush, as the bulk of the arab army had anticipated this movement. This resulted in the massacre of more than 8,000 souls, giving victory to the Muslim empire and crushing the rebellion of Toledo.

— Ibn Khaldun

== The battle ==
The organized forces of Muhammad I were easily able to rout the town rabble and their Christian men at arms from Asturias and Pamplona. They were however, unable to take the actual city for another 7 years.

== Consequences ==
After the Toledan and Asturian forces were defeated at Guadalacete, Muhammad I failed to capture the city. The rebellion, which was inspired by the Christian clergy and aided by the Muladi, was prolonged until the year 858 due to a continued desire for independence from Cordoba. In 858 Muhammad finally conquered the city and jailed Bishop Eugenio, who was executed the following year.

== See also ==
- Reconquista
  - Asturias in the Reconquista
- Muhammad I of Córdoba
- Emirate of Córdoba
- Kingdom of Asturias
