= Musa ibn Musa al-Qasawi =

Leader of the Muwallad Banu Qasi

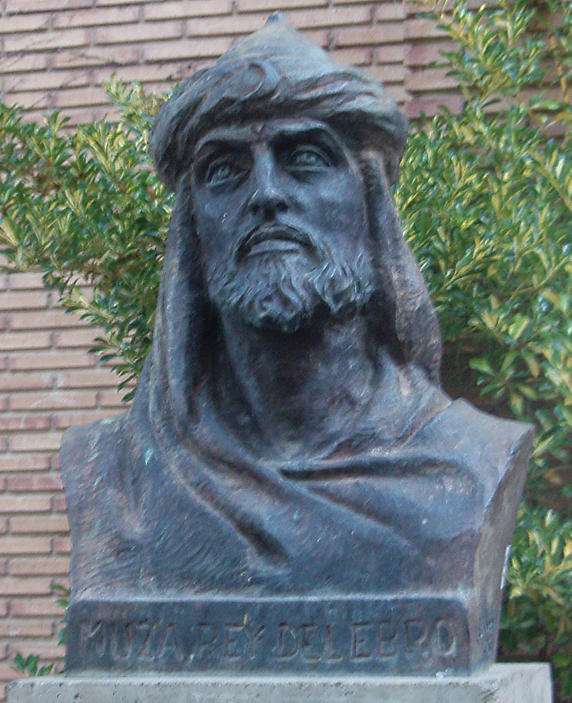
Bust honouring Musa ibn Musa in Tudela, Navarre.

Musa ibn Musa al-Qasawi (Arabic: موسى بن موسى القسوي) also nicknamed the Great (Arabic: الكبير); died 26 September 862) was leader of the Muwallad Banu Qasi clan and ruler of a semi-autonomous principality in the upper Ebro valley in northern Iberia in the 9th century.

== Rise ==
Musa ibn Musa was descendant of Cassius, who converted to Islam after the Muslim conquest of Iberia. His father, Musa ibn Furtun, may be the man who was assassinated in the late 8th century, of necessity in Musa's youth, though this would create problematic chronology and a more recent reconstruction would make that man Musa ibn Musa's great-grandfather. His mother, whose name is unknown, was also mother by another husband of Basque chieftain Íñigo Arista, Musa's half-brother according to chronicler Ibn Hayyan. Musa's early years are obscure, although he is presumed to have supported the Basques against the Franks in the Second Battle of Ronceveaux, a battle generally credited as giving birth to the nascent Kingdom of Pamplona. Likewise it is claimed that in 839 his son Furtun ibn Musa led a campaign that resulted in a rout of the "king of the Gallaecians", "Loderik" or "Luzriq" and he leveled the defenses of Álava.

== Rebellion ==
It is in 840/41 that we first hear of Musa ibn Musa himself. In response to attacks on the lands of his half-brother, Íñigo Arista, and the expulsion of kinsman Abd al-Jabbar al-Qasawi by the brothers Abd Allah and Amir ibn Kalayb, governors respectively of Zaragoza and Tudela, Musa and Íñigo rose in rebellion against emir Abd ar-Rahman II. This led to a reprisal campaign under the leadership of the emir's son, Mutarrif, and general Abd al-Wahid ibn Yazid Iskandarani. In 842, Musa was in charge of the vanguard of the emir's army marching against Cerdanya, but believing himself mistreated by the commanding general, Musa again rebelled and along with his nephew, García Íñiguez of Pamplona, defeated a Cordoban army. Musa ibn Musa and Íñigo Íñiguez again joined forces to ambush and capture one of Abd ar-Rahman's commanders in 843, al-Harit, but the consequence was a massive military response from Córdoba, led by the Emir in person, resulting in the defeat of the allies and the taking of slaves in the vicinity of Pamplona. A second retaliatory expedition in 844 inflicted a further defeat, in which Fortún Íñiguez, the premier soldier of Pamplona, was killed and Musa and Íñigo barely escaped, while hundreds of the Pamplona nobility defected to the Cordoban side.

Musa submitted and in November led his troops to Seville, helping to defeat a large army of Viking raiders who had sacked the city. However, he again rebelled the next year. When Muhammad, son of Abd ar-Rahman, took Tudela, Musa submitted, offered his sons as hostages and went to the emir's court. In 846 Musa again was forced to submit, this time to the emir's son Hisham, but Abd ar-Rahman was again forced to launch punitive campaigns against Musa in 847, and in 850 when Musa and Íñigo again joined in rebellion, Musa's son Isma'il ibn Musa playing a critical role in the uprising.

Throughout this time, Musa faced opposition from within his family. Ibn Hazm reports that his brother, Yunus ibn Musa, remained loyal to Córdoba, and joined with the sons of their uncle Zahir ibn Fortun to fight Musa ibn Musa for most of his life, about 30 years.

== Third King of Spain ==
The Islamic year 237 (851/2) proved critical for Musa ibn Musa. In this year his half-brother and repeated ally in rebellion, Íñigo Arista, died, as did the emir, Abd er-Rahman II. Musa also gained a great victory in a two-day battle, defeating Basque or Gascon forces near Albelda. The next year, Musa's control over his territories and his links to the emirate were formalized, the new emir, Muhammad, naming Musa Wāli of Zaragoza and governor of the Upper March of Al-Andalus. The next decade marked the height of his power. He would control Zaragoza, Tudela, Huesca and Toledo, forming what was, in effect, a Taifa state stretching from Nájera to Zaragoza and Calatayud, and viewed as equivalent to the emirate of Córdoba and the Kingdom of Asturias, Musa being referred to as “The Third King of Spain”.

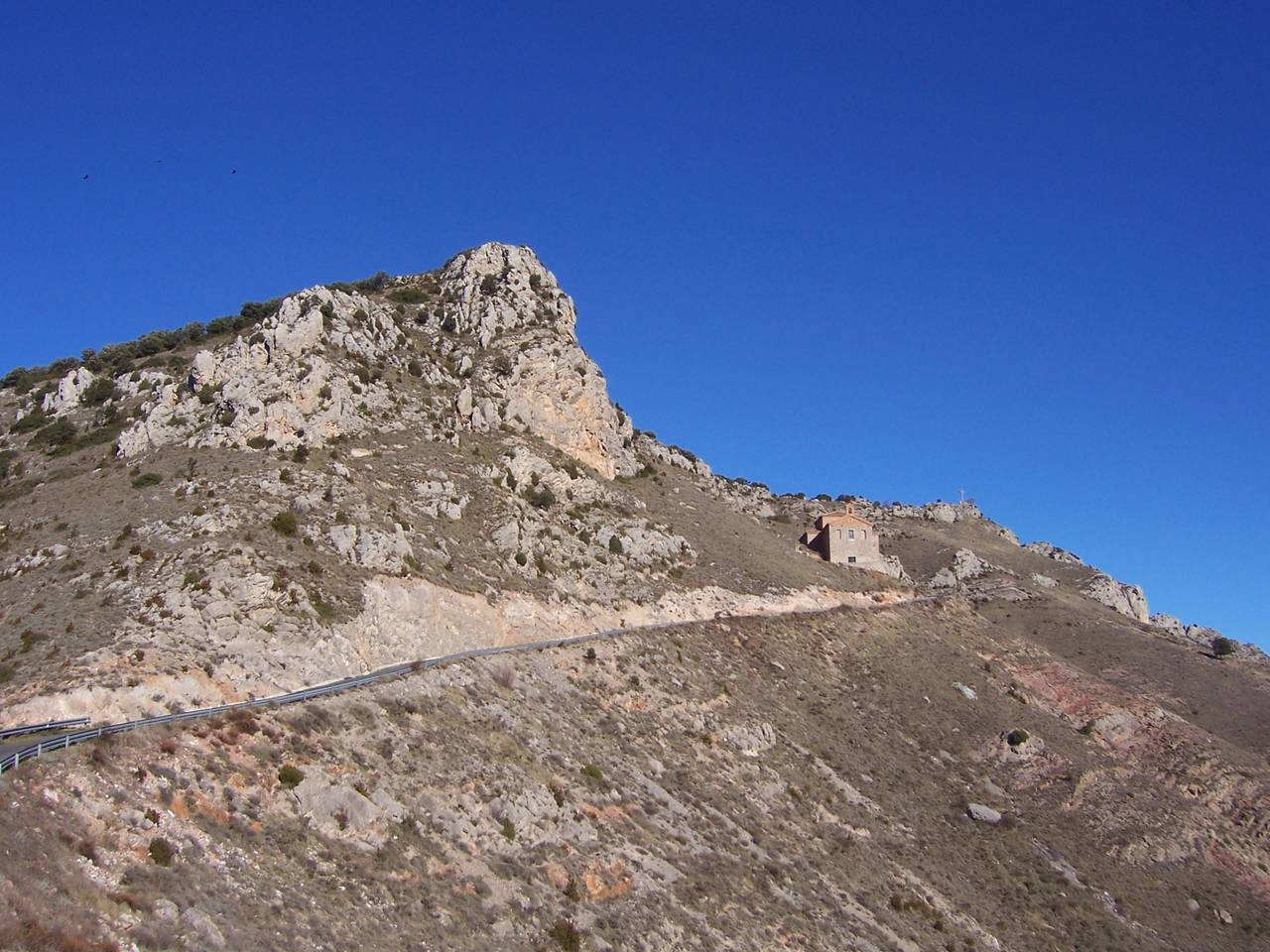
The hill of Monte Laturce today

In 854, Toledo rebelled, supported by Ordoño I of Asturias and García Íñiguez, and the emir Muhammad launched a punitive campaign which ended in the Battle of Guadalacete, Musa apparently participating on Córdoba's behalf. The next year(855) Musa led a Cordoban attack on Álava, in the southeastern section of the Kingdom of Asturias, and in 856 he launched an independent expedition against Barcelona and Terrassa. Apparently in 859, Musa's son Lubb ibn Musa al-Qasawi was appointed Wali of Toledo, and the same year, Musa permitted a Viking force to pass through his lands to attack Pamplona, where they captured Musa's nephew and former ally García Íñiguez and ransomed him for either 70,000 or 90,000 gold dinars. This further soured relations between the kinsmen, and García joined with Ordoño in an assault on Musa's lands, which led to a second battle at Albelda. The Christians divided their forces, besieging the town and pursuing Musa’a army to a refuge on Mount Laturce. They dealt Musa a crushing defeat, killing his son-in-law, an otherwise unknown Basque prince García, and forcing Musa to flee. This victory would be remembered in Christian sources in the form of the legendary Battle of Clavijo.

== Decline and Death ==
The Christian victory at Albeda led to the end of Musa's autonomy. In 860, emir Muhammad removed Musa as wali and governor, and personally led an army through Musa’a lands on a month-long punitive campaign against Pamplona which resulted in the capture of prince Fortún Garcés of Pamplona. In 861, Muhammad required Musa to play a subservient role in a campaign against Barcelona. The next year, 862, saw Musa trying to re-exert his power, directing a military show of force against his son-in-law, the Berber Azraq ibn Mantil ibn Salim (Arabic: ازراق بن منتيل). Musa attacked Guadalajara, but received several wounds, being unable to mount a horse. He withdrew to Tutila, where he died 26 September 862.

== Family ==
Musa ibn Musa is reported by the Códice de Roda to have married a daughter of his half-brother Íñigo Arista. She was not his only wife, as he also married a cousin Maymuna (Arabic: ميمونة), daughter of his paternal uncle Zahir ibn Furtun and mother of his younger son Isma'il. No source reports the mother of his other sons: Lubb, Mutarrif and Furtun. He had at least two daughters; Auria (Arabic: اوْرية, Awriyah), wife of Basque prince Garcia, killed at Mount Laturce, and by him having a son Musa ibn Garshiya; and another daughter, "the most beautiful girl in Al-Andalus", married to Azraq ibn Mantil.

== Legacy ==
The death of Musa led to a decade-long disappearance of the family from the political scene but it returned to rule over a shrinking territory for another half-century. However, their position between the growing powers of the caliphate to the south and the Christian principalities to the north proved untenable, and after three generations of varied success, the leaders of the family, Musa's great-great-grandsons, were displaced, exiled or killed by the end of the 920s and the last vestiges of Musa's principality disappeared. His pseudo-autonomy from a Córdoba unable to maintain direct control foreshadowed the Muwallad rebels of the early 10th century and the later Taifa kingdoms.
