= Battle of Albelda (851) =

9th-century battle of the Reconquista

Coordinates: 42.35°N 2.46667°W

- Part of the Reconquista
Date	851
Location	Albelda
Result	Umayyad Victory

Belligerents
Banu Qasi; Emirate of Córdoba	Franks; Gascons

Commanders and leaders
Musa ibn Musa	

Strength
Unknown	Unknown

The first Battle of Albelda took place near Albelda in 851 between the Muslim forces of Musa ibn Musa, chief of the Banu Qasi and governor of Tudela on behalf of the Emirate of Córdoba, and an army of the Franks and Gascons from France, probably allies of the Christian Kingdom of Asturias, inveterate enemy of Musa. The Muslims, who were probably the aggressors, were victorious.

The battle is usually connected with a campaign of Ordoño I of Asturias to suppress a Basque revolt, and may be related also to the capture of certain Frankish and Gascon leaders. In the past, the battle has been conflated with the Battle of Monte Laturce, also near Albelda, which occurred in 859 or 860.

According to Ibn Hayyan, in 237 A.H. (851/2 A.D.), the same year that Íñigo Arista died, Musa ibn Musa defeated the Gascons (Glaskiyyun) in battle under the walls of Albelda. On the first day of battle, Musa suffered serious losses, and he himself received thirty-five blows of a lance. On the second day Musa counterattacked and forced the Gascons to retreat. According to Ibn al-Athir, the Muslims invaded Christian territory in 851 and had a great victory at Albaida, the fame of which spread throughout al-Andalus. The Chronicle of Alfonso III records that Musa directed his forces against the "Franks and Gauls", killing many and razing many places. The Gascon presence at Albelda in 851 may be explained as an attempted reprisal for an attack by Musa north of the Pyrenees, since at that time Musa was allied with the Kingdom of Pamplona, Gascony's southern neighbour.

In 851, the year after he succeeded to the throne, Ordoño I of Asturias suppressed a revolt of his Basque subjects. This done he marched to the other side of the river Ebro and, "with the help of God" according to the Chronicle of Alfonso III, forced the "Chaldaeans" (an artful expression for the Muslims ) to flee. After this, the Chronicle adds, the Basques submitted. This encounter with the Muslims may be the same one as recorded by both Ibn Hayyan and Ibn al-Athir under the same year. It may have taken place near Albelda, Musa may have been commanding the Muslims, and it is possible that Ordoño's Gascon allies, called on to help quash the Basque insurrection, were put to flight by the Muslims, who were in turn put to flight by Ordoño.

It is possible that close ties existed between Asturias and Gascony at this time. Ordoño's kinsman, Alfonso II, had been allied with Velasco the Gascon, and the Gascons in times of rebellion may have sought out Asturian aid, even Asturian suzerainty, as an Aragonese charter of 867 may indicate.

The Chronicle records that, after the battle of Albelda in 851, and partly by means of war, partly by treachery, Musa captured two Frankish leaders, Sancho and Emenon, whom he threw into a dungeon. The date of Sancho and Emenon's capture is not given, but Sancho disappears suddenly from Gascony in 855, when his nephew, Arnold, a son of Emenon, appears as duke. Musa is known to have made an expedition against the Marca Hispanica in 855–6, as recorded in Ibn al-Athir, Ibn Idari, and Ibn Khaldun. It is possible, on the other hand, that Sancho and Emenon were captured at the encounter of 851, where Gascons are known to have been present, or in 852, during a Frankish campaign to rescue Barcelona (recently captured) recorded in the Annales regni Francorum. The "gifts" from the Frankish king Charles the Bald, which Ordoño's soldiers found in the camp of Musa at Monte Laturce, may have been the ransom paid for Sancho and Emenon, in which case their capture occurred prior to 859.
