= Raymond I of Ribagorza =

Raymond I (Catalan: Ramon, Spanish: Raimundo) (fl. 884–920) was the first independent count of Pallars and Ribagorza from 872 until his death. Early speculation made him a scion of the counts of Toulouse, but he is certainly the "Count Raymond, son of Count Lupus ... in the country of Pallars" (Regimundo comite, filio Luponi comiti ... in pago Paliarensi) of a 920 document. His father may have been the Basque Count Lupus I of Bigorre. During his lifetime Pallars represented the easternmost extent of the Basque language.

== Rise to power ==
Raymond was a local nobleman who in the aftermath of the assassination of Bernard II of Toulouse by partisans of Bernard Plantapilosa (872) seized authority for himself in Pallars and Ribagorza. The exact circumstances surrounding his rise are obscure, but he had probably held lands south of the Pyrenees from the County of Toulouse prior to gaining independence. Neither is it clear what part the leading men of the regions played in his elevation, but after the fact Pallars and Ribagorza were not even nominally attached to Francia.

== Rule ==
Raymond immediately made overtures of peace and alliance with the Banu Qasi governors of Huesca and Zaragoza, in 884 even purchasing Zaragoza, only to have it immediately reconquered by the Caliphate. In the end, a policy of Reconquista had to be adopted. Consequentially, his reign saw the encastellation of Pallars of Ribagorza and the proliferation of turres (defensive towers). Castles were built at Leovalles, Castellous, and Lemignano. Raymond also consolidated his de facto independence from any superior authority by creating a new diocese of Pallars, enabling himself to control the local church. Raymond also established an alliance with the Jiménez dynasty of Navarre. He married his sister Dadildis to García Jiménez of Pamplona, and in 905 he collaborated with Alfonso III of Asturias and Abd Allah ibn Lubb al-Qasawi in a coup that unseated Fortún Garcés of Pamplona in favor of Raymond's nephew, Sancho Garcés I.

== Later years ==
In 904 he was attacked by Lubb ibn Muhammad al-Qasawi, who took 700 prisoners, including Raymond's son Isarn. He lost much of Ribagorza, including Roda and Montpedrós, to Muhammad al-Tawil of Huesca in 907 and thereafter ruled mainly just Pallars, which had always been his political base. His wife may be the Giniguentes, daughter of Aznar Dat, mentioned in the Códice de Roda, but the text is ambiguous and probably refers to the wife of his son, Isarn. Pallars was inherited by his two youngest sons, Isarn and Llop, while mostly-overrun Ribagorza went to his two eldest, Miro and Bernard Unifred. Another son of Raymond was Ato, Bishop of Pallars, who appears as brother of both Bernard and Isarn in contemporary documents.

== Sources ==
- d'Abadal i de Vinyals, Ramon. Els comtats de Pallars i Ribagorça, Institut d’Estudis Catalans:Barcelona, 1955.
- del Arco y Garay, Ricardo. "España Christiana: Hasta el año 1035, fecha de la Muerte de Sancho Garcés III" in España Christiana: Comienzo de la Reconquista (711-1038). Historia de España [dirigida por Don Ramón Menéndez Pidal], vol. 6. Espasa-Calpe: Madrid, 1964.
- Lacarra, José María. "Textos navarros del Códice de Roda," Estudios de Edad Media de la Corona de Aragón, 1:194-283 (1945).
- Lewis, Archibald Ross. The Development of Southern French and Catalan Society, 718–1050. University of Texas Press: Austin, 1965.
- Pérez de Urbel, Justo. "Los Primeros Siiglos de la Reconquista, (Años 711-1038)" in España Christiana: Comienzo de la Reconquista (711-1038). Historia de España [dirigida por Don Ramón Menéndez Pidal], vol. 6. Espasa Calpe: Madrid, 1964.
- Serrano y Sans, Manuel. Noticias y documentos historicos del Contado di Ribagorza hasta la muerte de Sancho Garces III, Centro de Estudios Historicos: Madrid, 1912.
