= Battle of Monte Laturce =

859 battle of the Reconquista

Coordinates: 42.5833°N 2.7°W

- Part of the Reconquista
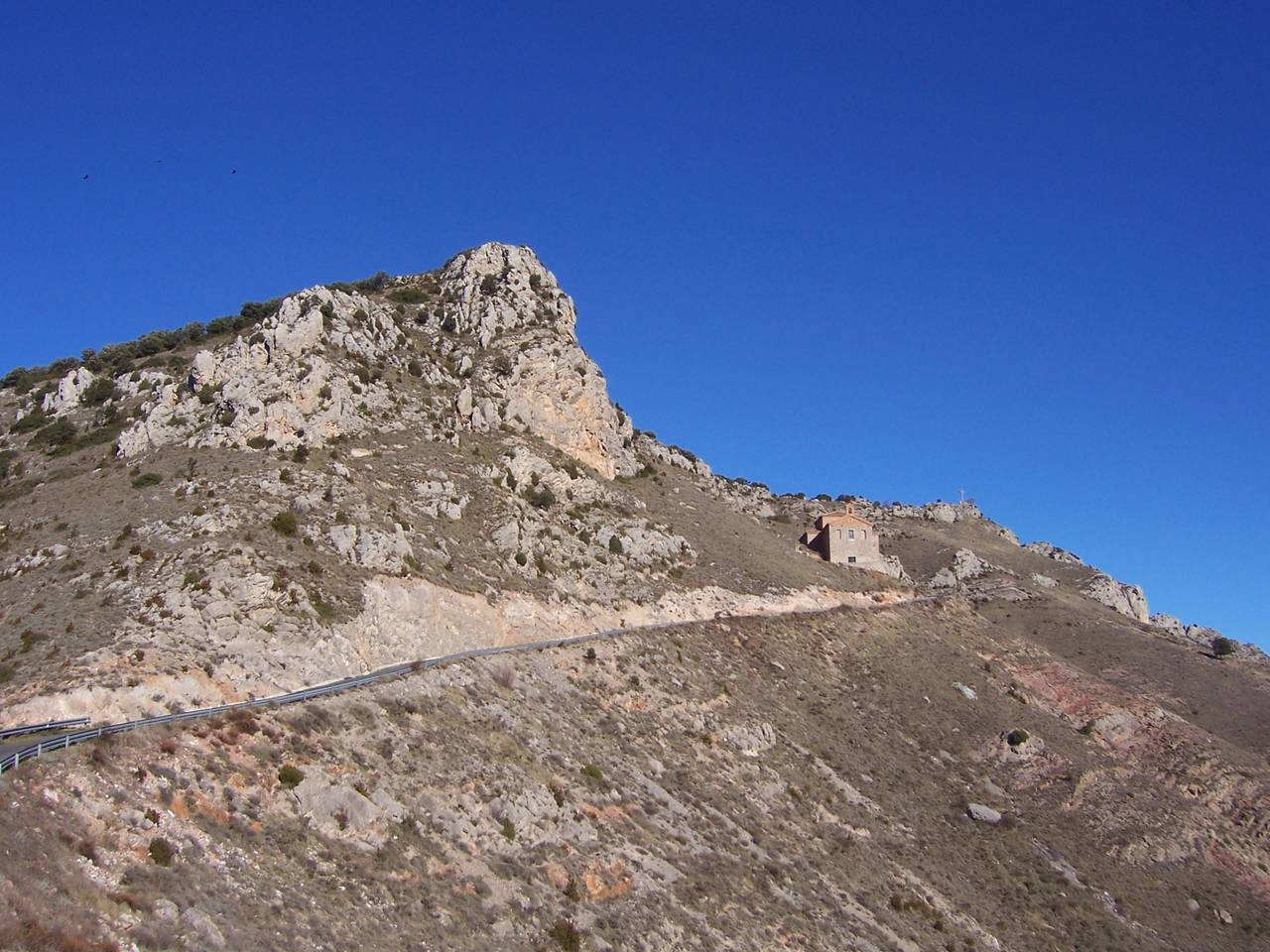
- The hill of Monte Laturce today
Date	859/860
Location	Albelda de Iregua
Result	Asturian–Pamplona Victory

Belligerents
Banu Qasi	Kingdom of Asturias; Kingdom of Pamplona

Commanders and leaders
Musa ibn Musa al-Qasawi	Ordoño I of Asturias; García Íñiguez of Pamplona

The Battle of Monte Laturce, also known as the second Battle of Albelda, was a victory for the forces of Ordoño I of Asturias and his ally García Íñiguez of Pamplona over the latter's uncle and former ally, Musa ibn Musa al-Qasawi, the Banu Qasi lord of Borja, Zaragoza, Terrer, and Tudela, Navarre, in 859 or 860.

The battle took place during the Asturian siege of a new fortress under construction by Musa at Albelda de Iregua. The fortress was taken a few days after the battle. After Monte Laturce, Musa was forced to fully submit to the Emir of Córdoba, who took advantage of Musa's weakness to remove him as wāli of the Upper March, initiating a decade-long eclipse of the Banu Qasi.

The Chronicle of Alfonso III relates how, in an unspecified year, Ordoño marched against the Musa while the latter was constructing a massive fortification at Albelda. While the Asturian monarch invested the new fortress, Musa camped his army on the nearby hill of Monte Laturce, hoping to force the raising of the siege. Ordoño divided his forces, leaving one half to tend to the ongoing siege and taking the other to challenge Musa. In a pitched battle the Muslims were routed; Musa was severely injured and barely evaded capture, while his Basque son-in-law, García (distinct from García Íñiguez), was killed.

The Christians counted 12,000 Muslim cavalry among the dead, and in the Muslim camp were found the treasures which Charles the Bald, king of West Francia, had recently sent to the Muslim warlord. Ordoño then concentrated all his men on taking the fortress, which they did on the seventh day of the siege. Its defenders were executed and then its walls razed. Musa's son, Lubb ibn Musa, the governor of Toledo, on learning of his father's defeat, immediately submitted to Ordoño and remained loyal to him until his death.

The battle appears to have impressed itself on the memory of its generation (at least regionally), for the Riojan Chronica Prophetica (composed in 882) contains a regnal list of Asturian kings coloured with a few annotations. Besides the name and reign of Ordoño I is the notice Ipse allisit Albaida: This one destroyed Albelda. The Battle of Monte Laturce provided aspects for the fictional Battle of Clavijo.

The Chronica Albeldense, probably composed in Rioja and possibly by an eye-witness, records that Ordoño entered the city of Albelda after a bloody siege, adding that Musa was spreading lies from his encampment atop Monte Laturce before his army was annihilated. He himself was pierced by an arrow and would have been captured had not a friend of his — "a Christian soldier in another time," the Chronica says — offered his own horse to save Musa's life.

The rout of Monte Laturce is usually dated to 859 or 860. The only source which may directly speak of Monte Laturce under the year 859 is Ibn al-Athir, who wrote that in 245 AH (which began 7 April 859) the Muslim governor of Tarazona (who is known to have been Musa at the time) invaded the Kingdom of Pamplona and captured a Christian castle, taking its inhabitants prisoner. The next day he was defeated in battle and many Muslims lost their lives.

The Chronicle of Alfonso III records that, after the Battle of Albelda in 851, and partly by means of war, partly by treachery, Musa captured two Frankish leaders, Sancho and Emenon, whom he threw into a dungeon. The date of Sancho and Emenon's capture is not given. The "gifts" from Charles the Bald which Ordoño's soldiers found in the camp of Musa at Monte Laturce may have been the ransom paid for Sancho and Emenon, in which case their capture occurred prior to 859/60.
