= Abu Taur of Huesca =

Abu Tawr (Arabic: أبو ثور) was wali of Washka, a Muslim nobleman, perhaps member of the Banu Salama (Arabic: بني سلمة) clan. Alternatively, it has been suggested that he may be the individual Al-Andalus genealogist Ibn Hazm named as Abu Tawr ibn Qasi, son of the eponymous ancestor of the powerful Muwallad Banu Qasis.

At the imperial diet of Paderborn, he joined with Sulayman al-Arabi, the wali of Barcelona, and Husayn, wali of Zaragoza, in offering of their domains to Charlemagne in exchange for military aid in a new revolt against Emir Abd ar-Rahman I, with the aim of reinstating Abbasid power in Al-Andalus. Charlemagne marched an army and took possession of Barcelona and Washka in 778, but Huseyn reneged and following an unsuccessful assault on Zaragoza, the alliance ended in failure with the Frankish withdrawal and defeat at Roncesvaux.

In 790 he proposed an alliance with Louis the Pious.
