= Abu Jafar ibn Harun al-Turjali =

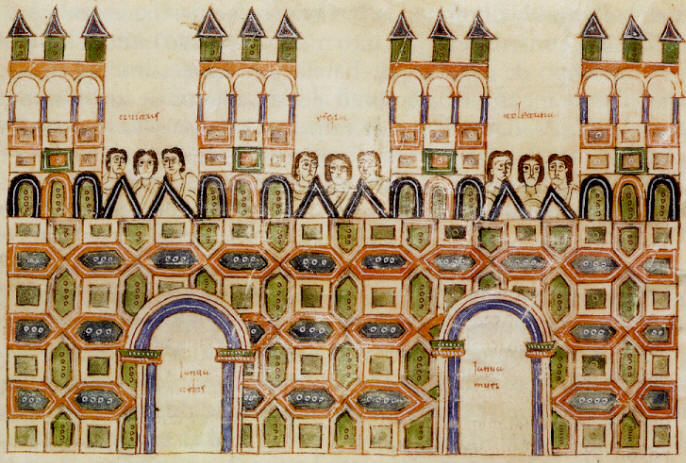
Muwallad art from Toledo in Al-Andalus depicting the Alcázar in the year 976.AD

Abu Jafar ibn Harun al-Turjali (Arabic: أبو جعفر بن هارون الترجالي) (died c. 1180) was born and raised in Trujillo to a noted Muwallad Muslim family. He received his education in Cordoba and later entered Almoravid service as a physician in Seville in Al-Andalus, he was a talented reader regarding the works of philosophy, he was thoroughly familiar with the Principles (usul) and the Branches (fura) of medical science, he was an excellent practitioner and his cures were frequently successful. He was the renowned educator of Ibn Bajjah and the young Ibn Rushd in his late years.
