= Banu Khalaf, Sardasht =

Village in West Azerbaijan province, Iran

Banu Khalaf Persian: بنوخلف
- Village
- Location within Iran
- Coordinates: 36°13′21″N 45°22′26″E
- Country: Iran
- Province: West Azerbaijan
- County: Sardasht
- District: Central
- Rural District: Baryaji

Population (2016)
  - Total: 422
- Time zone: UTC+3:30 (IRST)

Banu Khalaf (Persian: بنوخلف) (Note: Also romanized as Banū Khalaf; also known as Banī Khalaf and Banī Khalal) is a village in Baryaji Rural District of the Central District in Sardasht County, West Azerbaijan province, Iran.

== Demographics ==
=== Population ===
At the time of the 2006 National Census, the village's population was 394 in 69 households. The following census in 2011 counted 416 people in 107 households. The 2016 census measured the population of the village as 422 people in 118 households.
