= Muhammad al-Tawil of Huesca =

Muhammad ibn Abd al-Malik al-Tawil (Arabic: محمد بن عبد الملك الطويل, died 913 or 914) was a Muwallad Wāli of Huesca and a prominent Muslim lord in the Upper March (Arabic: الثغر الأعلى, Aṯ-Ṯaḡr al-Aʿlà) of Al-Andalus in the late-ninth and early-tenth centuries. Acting autonomously from his nominal masters the Emirs of Córdoba, he carried out his own foreign policy and fought both Christian and Muslim regional rivals, including the Counts of Barcelona, Pallars and Aragon, the King of Pamplona and the Banu Qasi of the Upper March. From him arose a short-lived dynasty, the Banu al-Tawil (Arabic: بنو الطويل), who would rule Huesca, Barbastro and Lleida, off and on, for a century, eventually losing out to the Banu Tujib of Zaragoza.

== Background ==
Muhammad al-Tawil was son of Abd al-Malik ibn Abd Allah ibn Shabrit, a local lord in the region of Huesca. He was a scion of the Banu Shabrit clan (Arabic: بنو شبريط), the descendants of Shabrit, a late-eighth-century relative and ally of rebel Amrus ibn Yusuf. On 12 March 887, Muhammad killed the great-grandson of Amrus, Mas'ud ibn Amrus, governor of Huesca, and seized power there.

== Rivalry with the Banu Qasi ==
In 889/90, Isma'il ibn Musa of Lleida, a member of the rival Banu Qasi, rose in rebellion against the Emirate. Muhammad ambushed an army led by Isma'il's sons, Musa and Mutarrif, leading to the death of Musa and 300 of his soldiers and the capture of Mutarrif. This defeat and the subsequent death of Isma'il ended the rebellion and al-Tawil petitioned the Emir to be given the lands of Isma'il. Instead emir Abd Allah returned the territory to the Banu Qasi, specifically to Muhammad ibn Lubb al-Qasawi, nephew of the rebel. In 893, al-Tawil witnessed a charter of king Fortún Garcés of Pamplona, appearing as 'pagan' Mohomat Atavel in Osca along with his rival Muhammad ibn Lubb. Three years later he again came to blows with the Banu Qasi. Muhammad al-Tawil mobilized his troops to oppose plans by Lubb ibn Muhammad, the son of the Banu Qasi head, to fortify or refortify Monzón. They fought a battle in which Lubb's undermanned and poorly equipped army was nonetheless able to rout the men of al-Tawil and capture his brother Furtun. In 898, the death of Muhammad ibn Lubb al-Qasawi while besieging Zaragoza presented Muhammad al-Tawil with an opportunity to recover lost ground, but Lubb ibn Muhammad returned from negotiations with another Muwallad rebel, Umar ibn Hafsun, to again defeat al-Tawil, this time capturing him. He was forced to cede Barbastro and lands between Huesca and Monzón and to pay 100,000 gold dinars as well as to give his son Abd al-Malik and daughter Sayyida as hostages to insure delivery of the money. Lubb subsequently married Sayyida and forgave the unpaid half of the ransom. Nothing is heard of al-Tawil over the next few years, perhaps because he had turned his armies against his Christian neighbors to the north in campaigns that escaped notice of the Cordoba-based chroniclers of Al-Andalus. He next appears in 906/7, taking the castles of Barbastro and Alquézar and the region of Al-Barbitanya from Lubb ibn Muhammad.

== Wars against the Christian North ==
In October 908, Muhammad al-Tawil launched a campaign against the County of Pallars. The castellan of Roda sent emissaries to sue for peace, offering tribute, but al-Tawil rejected them and destroyed the castle. He launched another attack on Monte Pedroso and Oliola, taking 300 prisoners whom he ransomed for 13,000 gold pieces. In 911, al-Tawil marched north, passing through the territory of his brother-in-law Count Galindo Aznárez II of Aragon. He then met up with Abd Allah, brother of Lubb ibn Muhammad al-Qasawi, for a strike against Pamplona. While the campaign experienced initial success, Sancho I of Pamplona eventually routed the southern troops and reasserted Pamplona's role as feudal lords over Galindo's Aragon. The next year saw Muhammad al-Tawil launch a campaign against Sunyer, Count of Barcelona, forcing him to flee the field of battle. However a second Barcelona campaign resulted in the death of Muhammad al-Tawil on 23 October 913.

== Family and legacy ==
Muhammad al-Tawil married Sancha Aznarez, daughter of Aznar Galíndez II of Aragon and maternal granddaughter of García Íñiguez of Pamplona. By her he had five children, sons Abd al-Malik, Amrus, Furtun, and Musa Aznar, and one daughter, Sayyida (called Velasquita in the Códice de Roda) who married Lubb ibn Muhammad al-Qasawi. He also had sons Yahya, Lubb and perhaps Walid, presumably to a different woman.

- Abd al-Malik ibn Muhammad succeeded his father in Huesca and Barbastro, giving Monzón to Amrus. Abd al-Malik faced two immediate challenges from Banu Shabrit kinsmen who entered Huesca intending to seize control, but the residents failed to support them and each was killed on the day they entered the city, Muhammad ibn Walid ibn Abd Allah ibn Shabrit on 8 August 915, and Zakariyya ibn Isa ibn Musa ibn Shabrit on 15 March 916. Abd al-Malik then had Asbag ibn Isa and Abd al-Malik ibn Isa, the brothers of Zakariyya, killed. His own brother Amrus was next to challenge him and Abd al-Malik ibn Muhammad was captured and strangled on 25 December 918.
- Amrus ibn Muhammad had been given Monzón by his brother in 914, but was rejected by the residents, who invited Muhammad ibn Lubb al-Qasawi to replace him. He took Huesca from his brother in 918, but was again rejected and was forced out within weeks. Amrus went to Barbastro and Alquézar, asking Abd-ar-Rahman III to appoint him governor there. He then enlisted the help of Sancho I of Pamplona and Bernard I Unifred of Ribagorza to reduce Monzón. He subsequently fought against his brother Furtun, the Banu Qasi, and the Banu Tujib, taking and ransoming several important hostages, but he found himself being captured and ransomed multiple times as well. He submitted to the Caliph in 933/4 and died 6 June 935.
- Furtun ibn Muhammad was nominated in Huesca in place of his brother Amrus. In 931/2 he signed a pact with Muhammad ibn Hasim, rebel leader of the Banu Tujib, and in response Abd ar-Rahman punished Huesca by imprisoning many men. Huesca responded by expelling Furtun in 933. He initially fled to Las Peñas de San Miguel y Aman, but then went to Córdoba and humbled himself before the Caliph and was restored to Huesca in 936/7. However, at the Battle of Simancas he withheld his troops from the fight, and he was hunted down near Calatayud by Salama ibn Ahmad ibn Salama, taken to Córdoba and crucified in front of its Al-Qasr.
- Yahya ibn Muhammad received Huesca when Furtun fled in 933 and governed Mérida from 935. However, he fell under suspicion and was imprisoned. Following Furtun's fall he was returned to favor and given Barbastro. He died there 20 December 951. He was succeeded in Barbastro by his brother Lubb ibn Muhammad, who died suddenly at Córdoba in December 955. Other sources report a brief interlude by Walid ibn Muhammad.
- Musa Aznar ibn Muhammad was given Lleida, and in 940, Huesca. He married Dadildis, daughter of Jimeno Garcés of Pamplona, dying 18 December 954. He was followed in Huesca by a son Abd al-Malik ibn Musa, who was later forced to share Huesca with his cousin, Yahya ibn Lubb, who had followed his father Lubb in Barbastro. The last identified member of the family was Walid ibn Abd al-Malik of the Banu Shabrit, who took part in a 974 tournament in Córdoba. Control of Huesca passed to the Banu Tujib.

While always nominally a vassal of Córdoba, the rebellious, semi-autonomous actions of the Banu al-Tawil along with those of their rivals the Banu Qasi set the stage for their Banu Tujib and Banu Hud successors to establish a fully independent taifa state in what had been the Upper March of the Caliphate.

== Family tree ==
Family tree

Banu Amrus
Banu Šabrit
Banu al-Tawil

Š....h
Rašid	Yusuf
Šabrit	Amrus ibn Yusuf
Abd Allah ibn Šabrit	Musa ibn Šabrit	Umar ibn Amrus	Yusuf ibn Amrus	Zakariyya ibn Amrus
Abd al-Malik ibn Abd Allah	Walid ibn Abd Allah	Isa ibn Musa	Zakariyya ibn Umar	Amrus ibn Umar	Umar ibn Zakariyya	Lubb ibn Zakariyya
Muhammad al-Tawil	Furtun ibn Abd al-Malik	Muhammad ibn Walid	Zakariyya ibn Isa	Asbag ibn Isa	Abd al-Malik ibn Isa	Mas'ud Ibn; Amrus
Abd al-Malik ibn al-Tawil	Amrus ibn al-Tawil	Furtun ibn al-Tawil	Musa Aznar ibn al-Tawil	Yahya ibn al-Tawil	Lubb ibn al-Tawil	Walid ibn al-Tawil
Abd al-Malik ibn Furtun	Abd al-Malik ibn Musa	Yahya ibn Lubb
Walid ibn Abd al-Malik

== Sources ==
- Alberto Cañada Juste, "Los Banu Qasi (714-924)", in Principe de Viana, vol. 41 (1980), pp. 5–95 (1980)
- Francisco Codera, "Mohámed Atauil, Rey Moro de Huesca", Revista de Aragón, vol. 1 (1900), pp. 81–85
- Fernando de la Granja, "La Marca Superior en la Obra de al-'Udrí", Estudios de la Edad Media de la Corona de Aragón, vol. 8 (1967), pp. 457–545.
- Kosto, Adam J. (2017). "Aragon and the Catalan Counties Before the Union". In Sabaté, Flocel (ed.). The Crown of Aragon: A Singular Mediterranean Empire. Brill. pp. 70–91.
- Philippe Sénac, La frontière et le hommes, VIIIe-XIIe siècle: le peuplement musulman au nord de l'Èbre et les débuts de la reconquête aragonaise, Maisonneuve & Larose, 2000.
