= Banu Salama =

The Banu Salama (Arabic: بني سلمة) were an Arab Hejazi family that governed the regions of Huesca and Barbitanya (Barbastro) in the Upper March of Al-Andalus from c. 780-800 CE.

In 800, the former ally of the Banu Salama, Bahlul Ibn Marzuq, rebelled in Zaragoza, defeating the Banu Salama's Arab allies along with the Banu Qasi in battle, taking the region and deposing the Banu Salama. Instrumental to their removal was the popular support garnered by Ibn Marzuq after public backing by theologian Ibn al-Mughallis.
