= Ibn Hayyan =

Al-Andalus Arab historian (987–1075)

- ابن حيَّان
- Born: 987; Córdoba, Al-Andalus (now Spain)
- Died: 1075 (aged 87–88)
- Occupation: Historian

Academic work
- Era: Islamic Golden Age
- Main interests: History of Al-Andalus
- Notable works: Al-Muqtabis fi Tarikh al-Andalus; Al-Akhbar fi'l Dawla al-Amiriya; Kitab al-Matin

Abū Marwān Ḥayyān ibn Khalaf ibn Ḥusayn ibn Ḥayyān al-Andalusī al-Qurṭubī (Arabic: ابن حيَّان القرطبي) (987–1075), usually known as Ibn Hayyan, was an Arab Muslim historian from Al-Andalus. His work provides an early reference to Viking raiders, called Majus by him.

== Works ==
The following works are ascribed to Ibn Hayyan:

- Tarikh Fuqaha Qurtuba
- Al-Kitab al ladi Jama'a fihi bayna Kitbay al-Qubbashi wa Ibn Afif
- Intijab al-Jamil li Ma'athir Banu Khatab
- Al-Akhbar fi'l Dawla al-Amiriya (in 100 volumes)
- Al-Batsha al-Kubra (in ten volumes).
- Al-Muqtabis fi Tarikh al-Andalus (in ten volumes)
- Kitab al-Matin.

His best-known works are al-Muqtabis and al-Matin.
