= Muladí =

Mixed or Iberian Muslims in medieval Al-Andalus

Muladí (Note: Spanish: muladí, [mulaˈði], pl. muladíes; Portuguese: muladi, [mulɐˈði], pl. muladis; Catalan: muladita, [muləˈðitə] or muladí, [muləˈði], pl. muladites or muladís; Arabic: مولد, trans. muwallad, pl. مولدون, muwalladūn or مولدين, muwalladīn) is a term used for the indigenous population of the Iberian Peninsula who adopted Islam after the Muslim conquest of the Iberian Peninsula in the early 8th century. The demarcation of muladíes from the population of Arab and Berber extraction was relevant in the first centuries of Islamic rule; however, by the 10th century, they had diluted into the bulk of the society of al-Andalus. In Sicily, Muslims of local descent or of mixed Arab, and Sicilian origin were also sometimes referred to as Muwallad. They were also called Musalimah ('Islamized'). In broader usage, the word muwallad is used to describe Arabs of mixed parentage, especially those not living in their ancestral homelands.

== Etymology ==
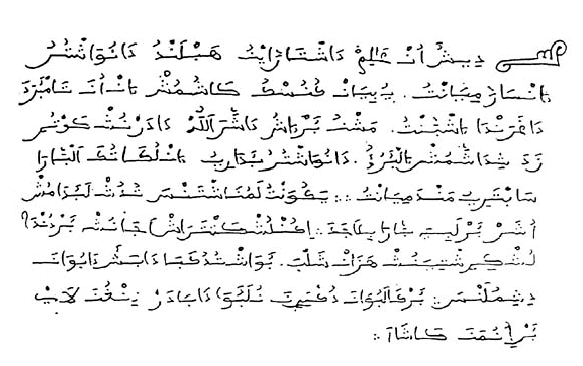
Aljamiado text in 16th century

The Spanish, Portuguese and Catalan words muladí, muladi or muladita are derived from the Arabic muwallad. The basic meaning of muwallad is 'a person of mixed ancestry', especially a descendant of one Arab and one non-Arab parent, who grew up under the influence of an Arabic society and were educated within the Islamic culture. Muladi is the Spanish form of the term muwalladun, referring to Arabic-speaking Muslims of Hispanic origin who showed the same behaviour patterns as rebels of Arab and Berber origin who had rebelled against Arab rule, such as during the Great Berber Revolt of 739/740–743 AD.

Muwallad is derived from walad (ولد), which means 'descendant, offspring, scion, son'. Muwallad referred to the offspring of Muslim men and foreign, non-Muslim women. The term muwalladin is sometimes used in Arabic to this day to describe the children of Muslim fathers and foreign mothers.

According to Dozy, Muwallad means "anyone who, without being of Muslim origin, is born among the Muslims and has been raised as an Arab". The word, according to him, does not necessarily imply Arab ancestry, either paternal or maternal.

According to the dictionary of the Real Academia Española, muladí means "Christian who, during the domination of the Arabs in Spain, converted to Islam and lived among the Muslims", while Bernards and Nawas say the plural form of the word seems to be restricted to al-Andalus, almost exclusively to the areas of Mérida, Granada, Seville and Jaén. Muladí has been offered as one of the possible etymological origins of the still-current Spanish and Portuguese term mulato, denoting a person of African (black) and European (white) ancestry; however, the dictionary of the Real Academia Española and several authorities trace mulato (and from it, English mulatto) to Spanish mulo 'mule', from Latin mūlus.

== History ==
In Islamic history muwalladun designates in a broader sense non-Arab Muslims or the descendants of converts. In the Muslim-ruled parts of the Iberian Peninsula, parts of the indigenous until-then Christian population (basically a mixture of the pre-Roman peoples of the Iberian Peninsula, ancient Romans, Visigoths and Suebi) converted to Islam in the 8th and 9th centuries. In the 10th century a massive conversion of Christians took place, so that muladies comprised the majority of the population of Al-Andalus by the century's end. However, the majority of Muwallads had converted to Islam early, but retained many pre-Islamic customs and characteristics.

Conversion to Islam was encouraged by the Umayyad caliphs and Emirs of Córdoba but it was not directly forced. Many Christians converted to Islam to avoid the jizya tax which they were subjected to as dhimmis. Conversion to Islam also opened up new horizons to the native Christians, alleviated their social position, ensured better living conditions, and broadened their scope for more technically skilled and advanced work.

Some Christians who converted to Islam became Mawali, or clients attached to an Arab tribe, and as such, were thoroughly Islamized, adopting the Arabic dress code, customs, and language.

The Muwallads were also called Muslima ('Islamized'), and elches (ilj, plural: ulus), in reference to the society from which they sprang. They later were denominated Aljamiados because of their non Arabic-tongue, that is, the Mozarabic languages.

Through the cultural Arabization of muladies and their increasing inter-marriage with some Berbers and Arabs present in Iberia, the distinctions between the different Muslim groups became increasingly blurred in the 11th and 12th centuries. The populations mixed with such rapidity that it was soon impossible to distinguish ethnically the elements of foreign origin from the natives. Thus they merged into a more homogeneous group of Andalusi Arabs, generally also called Moors.

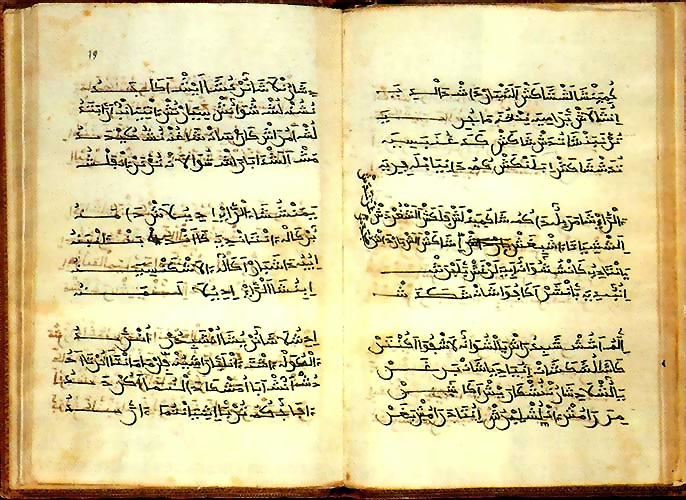
Poems in Aljamiado.

The Muwallads primarily spoke Andalusian Arabic, along with a wide variety of Iberian Romance languages. Andalusian Arabic was a mixture of Iberian languages and Classical Arabic, though derived especially from Latin. This local dialect of Arabic was also spoken by the Berbers and Arabs from the 9th century onwards.

In the process of acculturation, Muwallads may well have adopted an agnatic model of descent, but without abandoning the bilaterality of late Roman kinship. According to Abu Jafar ibn Harun of Trujillo a vast but silent majority of Muladi Muslims thrived, especially in the Extremadura region of Spain.

Among the Muwalladun were the free-born, the enfranchised, and the enslaved. A significant part of the Muwalladun was formed by freed slaves. These were the Saqaliba, or Slavs who became an important social group in Al-Andalus during the 10th and 11th centuries. Upon adopting the ethnic name of their patrons, the emancipated slaves gradually forgot their own ethnic origin. The Muslim slaves were the Saqaliba, led by Ali ibn Yusuf, who profited from the progressive crumbling of the Umayyad Caliphate's superstructure to gain control over the province of Denia. The Saqaliba managed to free themselves and gain dominion over the taifa, which extended its reach as far as the Balearic Islands, and their capital, Madina Mayurqa (now Palma de Majorca).

The intermarriage of foreign Muslims with native Christians made many Muwallads heedless of their Iberian origin. As a result, their descendants and many descendants of Christian converts forgot the descent of their ancestors and assumed forged Arab genealogies. However, there were a few who were proud of their Roman and Visigothic origins. These included the Banu Angelino and Banu Sabarico of Seville, Banu Qasi of Aragon, Banu l' Longo and Banu Qabturno. Several Muwallad nobles also used the name Al-Quti, ('the Goth'), and some may have been actual descendants from the family of the Visigothic King of Hispania, Wittiza.

The conversion of the native Christians to Islam did not mean the total erasure of previous beliefs and social practises. There is some evidence of a limited cultural borrowing from the Christians by the Muwalladun and other Muslims in Al-Andalus. For instance, the Muslims' adoption of the Christian solar calendar and holidays was an exclusively Andalusí phenomenon. In Al-Andalus, the Islamic lunar calendar was supplemented by the local solar calendar, which was more useful for agricultural and navigational purposes. Like the local Mozarabs (Iberian Christians under Muslim rule in the Al-Andalus who remained unconverted to Islam), the Muslims of Al-Andalus were notoriously heavy drinkers. The Muslims also celebrated traditional Christian holidays, sometimes with the sponsorship of their leaders, despite the fact that such fraternisation was generally opposed by the Ulema. The Muslims also hedged their religious devotions through the use of Roman Catholic sacraments.

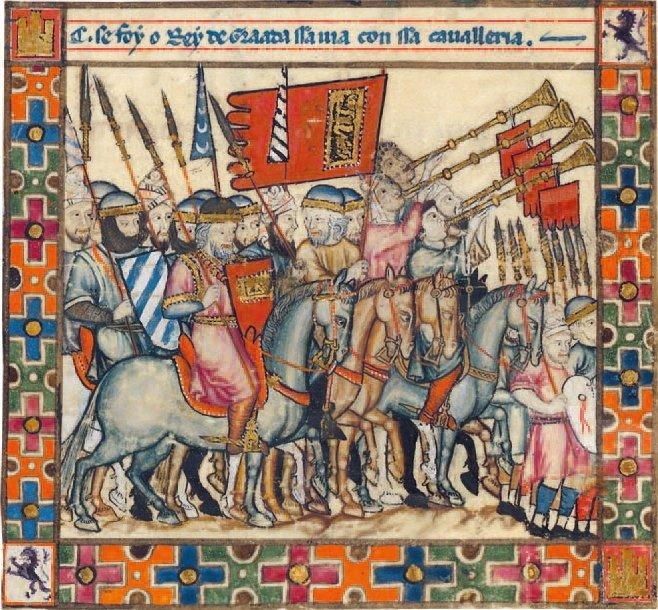
Depiction of the Muwallads in Iberia, from The Cantigas de Santa Maria

Many Muwallads held key posts in the departments of civil administration, justice, and the armed forces. Amrus ibn Yusuf, a Muwallad who was originally from Huesca, was appointed governor of Toledo by Hakam I in 797. Towards the end of the 11th century, the Muwalladun held distinctive posts in the judicial departments. The Caliph of Córdoba, Abd ar-Rahman III, once bestowed the post of chief qadi of Córdoba on a Christian convert, whose parents were still Christian, and the Fuqaha found much difficulty in dissuading him. The secretary of the Córdoban emir, Abd Allah, was a Muwallad. The commander of the Córdoban force in the battle of Alhandega against the Zamorans in 938 was a neo-Muslim Slavic general named Najdah. The 10th century Muwallad historian Ibn al-Qūṭiyya was descended directly on the maternal side from the Visigothic King Wittiza. In about 889 a ship carrying twenty Berber Muwallad adventurers from Pechina near Almería established a fortress in Fraxinet, on the Gulf of Saint-Tropez in Provence. They spoke both Latin and Arabic.

Several Muwalladun became rich and powerful magnates by means of trade, agriculture, and political activity. The Muwallads of the town the Christians called Elvira (nowadays Granada), after the former Iberian name Ilbira, had become so powerful during the reign of Abdullah ibn Muhammad al-Umawi (888–912) that they rose under a chieftain called Nabil and successfully drove the Moors out of the city. The Banu Qasi dynasty which ruled the upper Ebro valley in the 9th and 10th centuries, became strong enough to break free from the control of the Umayyad dynasty of Córdoba and turn from a semi-autonomous governorship to an independent taifa.

The Muwalladun were the mainstay of the economic framework of the country. Together with the Mozarabs they constituted the productive classes which were craftsmen and small tradesmen in the towns, and farmers and labourers in the rural countryside. However, they were inferior to the Arabs and Berbers in social status. Prominent positions in government and society were usually not available to individuals of Muladi descent. In spite of the Islamic doctrine of equality and brotherhood of Muslims, the Muwalladun were often looked down upon with the utmost contempt by the Arab and Berber aristocrats and were usually pejoratively referred to as "the sons of slaves".

The Muwallads, in turn, in spite of their profession of faith, despised the Arabs whom they viewed as colonialists and foreign intruders. This mutual feeling of hatred and suspicion provoked frequent revolts and led the Muwallads to support the Abbasid political agents, the preachers of Shu'ubiyya (a non-Arab movement), and subversive activities against the Umayyad rule in Iberia. The Shu'ubiyyah of Al-Andalus were active like the Arabs in promoting Arab-Islamic culture and language and claimed their integration with the Arab ethnic groups. The Shu'ubiyyah movement demanded equality of power, wealth and status for non-Arab Berbers and the Muwalladun from the Arabs. Some judges of Huesca upheld the cause of the Muwalladun in the beginning of the 10th century, and a literary epistle of the middle of the 11th century repeated arguments of Eastern Shu'ubite writers.

In Al-Andalus, the large numbers of Christians adopting Islam prompted concern among the authorities about the weakening of the tax base and further inflamed resentment towards the Muwallads.

The Muwallads were in almost constant revolt against the Arab and Berber immigrants who had carved out large estates for themselves, farmed by Christian serfs or slaves. The most famous of these revolts were led by a Muwallad rebel named Umar ibn Hafsun in the region of Málaga and Ronda. Ibn Hafsun ruled over several mountain valleys for nearly forty years, having the castle Bobastro as his residence. He rallied disaffected muwallads and mozárabs to his cause. Ibn Hafsun eventually renounced Islam with his sons and became a Christian, taking the name Samuel and proclaimed himself not only the leader of the Christian nationalist movement, but also the champion at the same time of a regular crusade against Islam. However, his conversion soon cost him the support of most of his Muwallad supporters who had no intention of ever becoming Christians, and led to the gradual erosion of his power.

There were also other Muwallad revolts throughout Al-Andalus. In the Elvira region, for instance, discord sprang up between the Muwallads and Moors, the latter being led by Sawar ibn Hamdub, and the poet, Sa'ad ibn Judi, both of whom fluctuated between insurrection against Abd'Allah and submission to him. In Seville, the second largest city after Córdoba, there was a vicious feud between the two Arab aristocratic families, Banu Hajjaj and Banu Khaldun, and two Muwallad noble families, Banu Angelino and Banu Sabarico, which finally left Ibrahim ibn Hajjaj as the ruler of an independent city-state.

In 805, the Muwallads of Córdoba, incited by certain theologians, revolted against the Umayyads under Hakim I, but the uprising was suppressed. In 814, there was a second revolt of Muwallads in Corboba, and this time the revolt was put down with the utmost severity, and resulted in the expulsion of 9,500 Muwallads from Córdoba, with over 1,500 going to Alexandria and 8,000 to Fez. In 858, there was a Muwallad revolt in Mérida, led by Ibn Marwan. The Muwallads complained of the taxation of their lands as if they were still Christian. The revolt's outcome was the defeat of Ibn Marwan. Mérida was subdued, but the centre of revolt soon moved to Badajoz.

The Muwallads were sometimes assisted in their revolts by the local Mozarab population, and occasionally by the Christian powers. For instance, when the Muwalladun of Toledo revolted, aided by the large Mozarabic population of the city, Ordoño I of Asturias, promptly responded to their appeal for help, but the Emir's forces were routed by the Toledans and Asturians at the battle of Guadalacete in 854.

Many minor rebels from among the Muladi leadership took possession of various sites, their descendants eventually becoming semi-independent Emirs. These included:

- Ubayd Allah ibn Umayya ibn Shaliya in Shumantan (present-day Somontin in the region of Jaén),
- Saʿid ibn Mastanna in Baghu (Priego),
- Khayr ibn Shakir in Shudhar (Jodar),
- Saʿid ibn Hudhayl in al-Muntliyun (Monleon near Jaén),
- Daysam ibn Ishaq in Murcia and Lurqa (Lorca),
- ʿAbd al-Malik ibn ʿAbd-al Jamal in Beja and Mirtula (Mértola) in Portugal,
- Bakr ibn Yahya in Shantamariyyat al-Gharb (the present-day city of Faro in Algarve, Southern Portugal).
- Muhammad ibn ʿUmar ibn Khattab ibn Angelino, of Seville rebelled against Abd ar-Rahman III

On the western frontier of Al-Andalus, the Muwalladun and Berber families divided control of the region containing Mérida, Badajoz, and their environs.

== Notable Muladi ==
- Abū ʿAbd Allāh Muḥammad ibn Saʿd ibn Mardanīsh
- Abu Hafs
- Abu Jafar ibn Harun al-Turjali
- Abu Taur of Huesca
- Al-Tutili
- Al-Udri
- Ibn-Rushd (Averroes)
- Al-Qurtubi
- Amrus ibn Yusuf
- Ibn al-Qūṭiyya
- Ibn al-Yayyab
- Ibn at-Tafiz
- Ibn Ammar
- Ibn Faradi
- Ibn Gharsiya
- Ibn Hazm
- Ibn Marwan
- Ibn Quzman
- Muhammad al-Tawil of Huesca
- Musa ibn Musa al-Qasawi

== See also ==
- Moors
- Umar ibn Hafsun
- Mozarabs, local population who remained Christians as dhimmis.
- Banu Qasi, a Muladi family descending from a Visigothic lord Cassius who became the independent rulers of their own taifa.
- Mudéjars, Muslims living under Christian rulers.
- Moriscos, former Muslims who converted to Catholicism.
- Wulayti
