= Aureolus of Aragon =

Count of Aragorn

Aureolus (died 809) is traditionally thought to have been the chief of the Franks in the region of Aragón.

Between 798 and 802, the Franks established several positions in the zone: Bahlul Ibn Marzuq revolted in Zaragoza against the central government of Muslim Al-Andalus in 798, and in 800, conquered Huesca from the Banu Salama. General Amrus ibn Yusuf (born in Huesca), sent by the Amir, conquered Zaragoza and Huesca (c. 801). Bahlul fled to Pallars and was killed by his lieutenant Jalaf Ibn Rashid (802), who at the time held Barbitanya (Barbastro). With all these disturbances, the Franks established control over Jaca and other castles and designated Aureolus as count of Aragón.

After Aureolus died in 809, the Frankish lobby secured succession for Aznar Galíndez I, but Amrus ibn Yusuf overran the county of Sobrarbe, which was not reconquered by Aznar until 814.

New title	Count of Aragon; 802–809	Succeeded by Aznar Galíndez I
