= Abd al-Rahman ibn Habib al-Siqlabi =

8th-century Abbasid governor of al-Andalus

ʿAbd al-Raḥmān ibn Ḥabīb al-Fihrī (Arabic: عبدالرحمن بن حبيب الفهري), called al-Ṣiqlabī (الصقلبي), was an Abbasid-appointed governor of al-Andalus (Spain) in the 770s. He was sent from Ifrīqiya to oppose the Umayyad ruler ʿAbd al-Raḥmān I. He landed in Tudmīr and demanded the submission of Sulaymān ibn Yaqẓān al-Kalbī al-Aʿrābī, commander of Barcelona. When this was refused, he marched against him and was defeated near Valencia. Shortly afterwards he was assassinated by a Berber. His was the last effort by the Abbasids to assert their rule in al-Andalus.

Ibn Ḥabīb was a member of the Fihrid family, which was prominent in Ifrīqiya. A Fihrid, Yūsuf ibn ʿAbd al-Raḥmān al-Fihrī, was the governor of al-Andalus deposed by ʿAbd al-Raḥmān I in 756. According to some modern historians, Ibn Ḥabīb was also related by marriage to Yūsuf, but this is not supported by any primary source. Ibn Ḥabīb's nickname, al-Ṣiqlabī, literally means "the Slav", but according to Ibn ʿIdhārī it was given to him not on account of his origins but because of his tall height, fair complexion and blue eyes.

The region of Tudmīr in southeastern Spain, which Ibn Ḥabīb made his base of operations, was originally an autonomous Christian tributary under Theodemir, who gave his name to the region. It was still under the rule of Theodemir's son Athanagild as late as 754. Ibn Ḥabīb's decision to target Barcelona when the centre of Umayyad power, Córdoba, lay closer to Tudmīr is difficult to explain. Possibly Ibn Ḥabīb believed there was more support for the Abbasids among the Yemenis of the northeast and hoped by his challenge to Ibn al-Aʿrābī to draw them to his following. The 11th-century Collection of Anecdotes on the Conquest of al-Andalus places Ibn Ḥabīb's arrival shortly after ʿAbd al-Raḥmān I had defeated a Yemeni rebellion in Seville, so perhaps he judged that his base of support near Córdoba had been too weakened for an immediate attack on the centre.

The Arabic sources are inconsistent in dating Ibn Ḥabīb's arrival in Spain. The Collection of Anecdotes placed it around 775, but Ibn al-Athīr writing in the 13th century placed it in 778. Collating the Arabic and Latin sources, Roger Collins places it in the early 770s. Antonio Ubieto Arteta, accepts a date of 161 AH, which fell between 9 October 777 and 27 September 778. Pierre Guichard, basing his conclusion on Ibn al-Athīr and al-ʿUdhrī, places Ibn Ḥabīb's arrival in 161 (777). Guichard believes he held out in Tudmīr for several months before being forced to hide out in "the mountains of the land of Valencia" until his assassination in 163 (779).

According to the Collection of Anecdotes, the Berber who assassinated him, Sḥaʿān, had ingratiated himself with Ibn Ḥabīb for just that purpose. Having killed him, he led the pro-Abbasid cavalry over to ʿAbd al-Raḥmān I.

Some modern historians have linked Ibn Ḥabīb to the embassy sent by Sulaymān al-Aʿrābī of Barcelona and Ḥusayn of Zaragoza to Charlemagne, king of the Franks, in 777. This search for an alliance abroad against ʿAbd al-Raḥmān I precipitated the Frankish campaign that ended in disaster at the battle of Roncevaux Pass. Ibn Ḥabīb's involvement, however, is chronologically impossible as well as incongruous with al-Aʿrābī's cool reception to Ibn Ḥabīb's overtures.
