= Aysun ibn Sulayman ibn Yaqdhan al-A'rabi =

ʿAysūn ibn Sulaymān ibn Yaqdhān al-Kalbī al-Aʿrābī (Arabic: عيشون بن سليمان بن يقظان الكلبي الأعرابي), often known as Ayxun or Aisso, was the son of Sulayman al-Arabi, who was the wali of Barcelona and Girona in the late 8th century.

Aysun, together with his father Sulayman al-Arabi, joined Charlemagne's army that besieged Zaragoza in 778. When Zaragoza failed to surrender, Charlemagne took hostages from his allies, including Sulayman.

Aysun and his brother Matruh al-Arabi were allied to the Basques, and at the battle of Roncesvalles they attacked the baggage train of the Frankish army in 778, releasing their father. Their father returned to Zaragoza and sent Matruh to govern Barcelona (and Girona). However, in 780 Sulayman was killed by his former friend and Husayn of Zaragoza.

As a result, Aysun gave his loyalty to the Emir of Cordoba, Abd al-Rahman I, who was seeking to impose control over the northern Iberian states. He participated in the assault on Zaragoza in 781 (that compelled to Husayn submit) and in subsequent expeditions into Basque territories and Cerdaña, moving on then to Barcelona where his brother as Wali also submitted to the Emir.

Aysun had two servants: Amrus ibn Yusuf, a future general, and Sabrit, who after 785 served Matruh. Matruh rebelled and took Huesca and Zaragoza in about 789. However, Matruh was killed by Amrus (who became a supporter of the Emir) and Sarhabil ibn Saltan al-Zawagi in 791 or 792.

Al-Udri reports that Aysun was taken prisoner during the capture of Girona and sent to Aachen. According to Al-Udri, Aysun later escaped with the assistance of his servant Amrus.

Aysun shares his name with Aissó, leader of a revolt in 826. It has accordingly been suggested by historians including Al-Udri that as an elderly man Aysun escaped in the 826, to lead the revolt of the Goths and supporters of peace with the Muslims. However, there is no evidence to prove this, and it may simply have been a confusion of two different people with similar names.
