= Matruh al-Arabi =

Matruh ben Sulayman al-Arabi (Arabic: مطروح بن سليمان بن يقظان الكلبي القضاعي الأعرابي) was a Wali, or governor, of Barcelona from 778 to 792.

Matruh, together with his father Sulayman al-Arabi, joined Charlemagne's army to besiege Zaragoza in 778. When Zaragoza failed to surrender, Charlemagne took hostages from his allies, including Sulayman al-Arabi. Matruh and his brother Aysun allied to the Basques, and at the Battle of Roncevaux Pass they ambushed Charlemagne's baggage train, releasing their father.

Sulayman returned to Zaragoza where, in 780, he was killed by his former friend and ally Husayn of Zaragoza. As a result, Matruh became wali of Barcelona and Girona. In 781 the Emir of Córdoba, Abd al-Rahman I, subdued Zaragoza. Matruh had probably given his loyalty to the Emir before this and was confirmed as the wali of Barcelona.

After 785 two servants of Matruh's brother Aysun, Amrus ben Yusuf and his kinsman Shabrit, entered his service. Shortly afterwards Matruh rebelled again against the Emir and took Huesca and Zaragoza in about 789. However, in 791 or 792 Matruh was assassinated by his servants Amrus and Shabrit. Amrus was rewarded by the Emir.

| Preceded by Sulayman al-Arabi | Wali of Barcelona; 778–792 | Succeeded by Sa'dun al Ruayni |
