= Amrus ibn Yusuf =

'Amrus ibn Yusuf al-Muwallad al-Laridi (Arabic: عمروس بن يوسف المولد, died 808/9 or 813/4) was a Muwallad (probably of Visigothic origin) general of the Emirate of Córdoba and governor of Zaragoza.

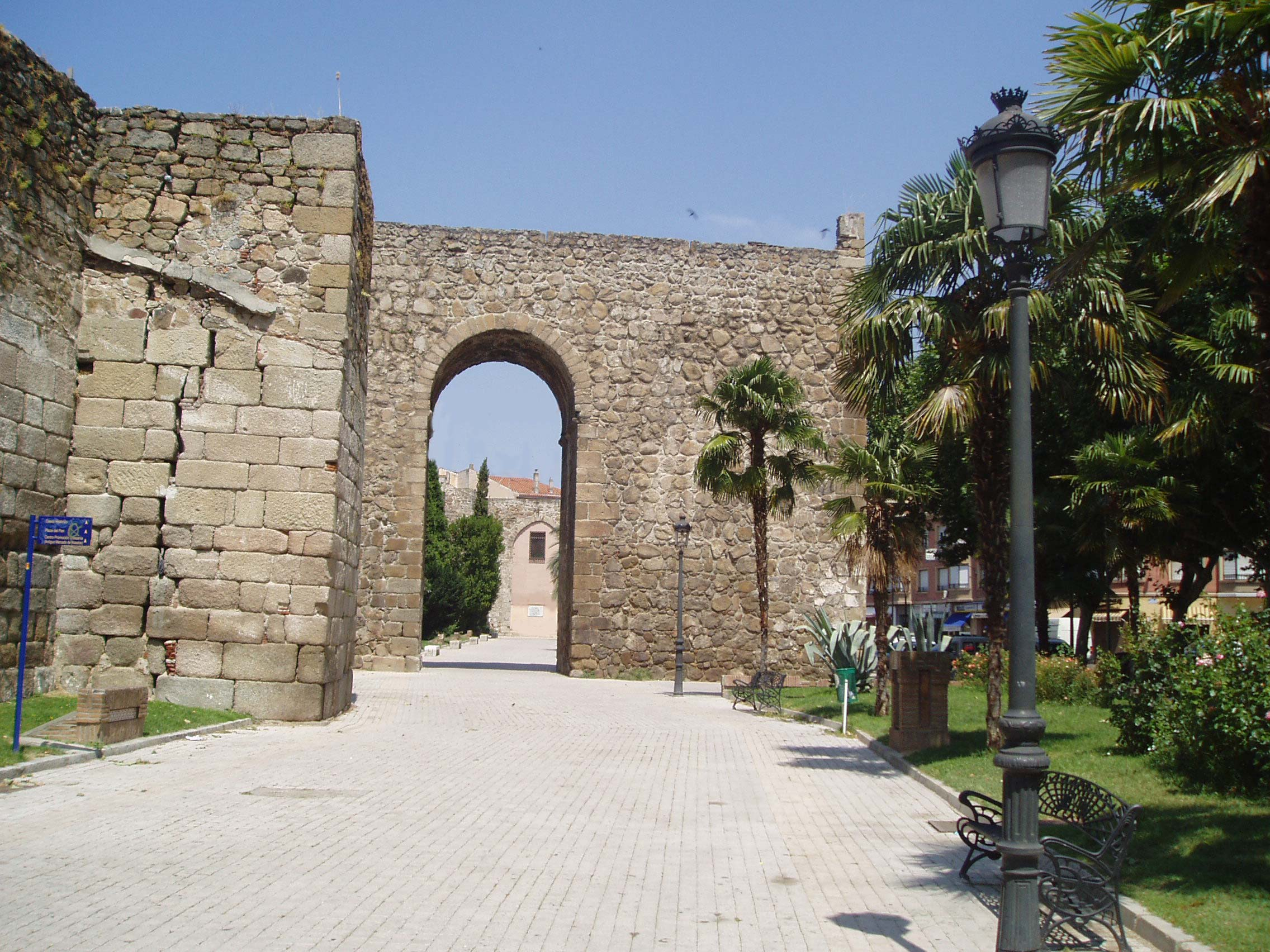
Walls of the ancient Andalusi Qaṣbah of Talavera de la Reina.

Amrus, a native of Huesca, and his kinsman Shabrit (Arabic: شبريط) were mawālī servants of Aysun ibn Sulayman al-Arabi, who was the son of the wali of Barcelona and Girona. The kinsmen joined Aysun's brother when Matruh al-Arabi rebelled and entered Zaragoza. In Muslim year 175 (AD 791/2), Amrus turned on his master, and he and Sarhabil ibn Saltan al-Zawagi attacked Matruh with swords, killing him. Amrus then went to Córdoba, where he was rewarded by being named wali of Talavera.

In 797, Amrus went to Toledo to suppress a nascent rebellion. Upon arriving, he invited most of the city leaders to a banquet at the castle under the guise of honoring the Emir’s young heir. As the guests entered the fortress one by one, they were decapitated by Amrus' forces, who threw their bodies into a ditch. This brutal massacre, which reportedly claimed around 700 lives, became known as the "Day of the Ditch" and successfully quelled the insurrection. Amrus subsequently served as governor of Toledo until 802.

In 802, he was sent from Toledo as general against another Zaragoza rebel, taking Zaragoza and Huesca, expelling Bahlul ibn Marzuq and fortifying a settlement that would become Tudela, installing there his son Yusuf ibn Amrus. Zaragoza again rebelled in December, 802, this time under Fortun ibn Musa, apparently a member of the Banu Qasi, and Amrus was in the year 803/804 appointed as governor of Zaragoza. He installed his kinsman, Sabrit, in Huesca. In 807, he quelled a rebellion in Tudela, and upon the death of Oriol of Aragon, he occupied the county of Sobrarbe, which was only regained by Aragon under Aznar Galíndez I in 814. This conforms with the timeline provided by the chronicler Al-Udri, who reports that Amrus held Zaragoza for 40 days short of ten years, placing his death in 198 (813/4), but al-Udri indicated that others place his death in 193 (808/809).

His family, the Banu Amrus (Arabic: بنو عمروس), continued to be involved in the regional politics of the upper Ebro valley. Grandson Amrus ibn Umar ibn Amrus (عمروس بن عمرو بن عمروس) rebelled in Huesca in 870, capturing his cousin Lubb ibn Zakariyya ibn Amrus (Arabic: لبّ بن زكريّا بن عمروس), and killing the amil Musa ibn Galind (موسى بن قلند), allying himself with the amil 's paternal uncle García Íñiguez of Pamplona. However, he shortly was enticed to return to Cordoban loyalty, being made governor of Toledo. Also active at this time were his brother Zakariyya ibn Umar, his uncle Zakariyya ibn Amrus and the latter's son Umar ibn Zakariyya. Mas'ud ibn Amrus (مسعود بن عمروس), son of Amrus ibn Umar, was the last of the family, being killed in 884 by kinsman Muhammad al-Tawil of Huesca, a member of the Banu Sabrit, the descendants of the kinsman and ally of Amrus ibn Yusuf. Muhammad founded a family known as the Banu al-Tawil that would rule what was effectively a short-lived taifa state at Huesca in the late 9th and early 10th century before themselves being supplanted by the Banu Tujib of Zaragoza.

== Family tree ==
Family tree

Banu Amrus
Banu Šabrit
Banu al-Tawil

Š....h
Rašid	Yusuf
Šabrit	Amrus ibn Yusuf
Abd Allah ibn Šabrit	Musa ibn Šabrit	Umar ibn Amrus	Yusuf ibn Amrus	Zakariyya ibn Amrus
Abd al-Malik ibn Abd Allah	Walid ibn Abd Allah	Isa ibn Musa	Zakariyya ibn Umar	Amrus ibn Umar	Umar ibn Zakariyya	Lubb ibn Zakariyya
Muhammad al-Tawil	Muhammad ibn Walid	Zakariyya ibn Isa	Asbag ibn Isa	Abd al-Malik ibn Isa	Mas'ud Ibn; Amrus
Abd al-Malik ibn al-Tawil	Amrus ibn al-Tawil	Furtun ibn al-Tawil	Musa Aznar ibn al-Tawil	Yahya ibn al-Tawil	Lubb ibn al-Tawil	Walid ibn al-Tawil
Abd al-Malik ibn Furtun	Abd al-Malik ibn Musa	Yahya ibn Lubb
Walid ibn Abd al-Malik

== Sources ==
- Alberto Cañada Juste, "Los Banu Qasi (714-924)", in Principe de Viana, vol. 41, pp. 5–95 (1980).
- Fernando de la Granja, "La Marca Superior en la Obra de al-'Udrí", Estudios de la Edad Media de la Corona de Aragón, vol. 8 (1967), pp. 457–545.
- Évariste Lévi-Provençal, Histoire de l'Espagne musulmane (1944-1953).
- Hugh Kennedy, Muslim Spain and Portugal: A Political History of al-Andalus (1996), pp. 41-42.
