= Banu Shabrit =

The Banū Shabrīṭ, sometimes called the Banū al-Ṭawīl, were a prominent muwallad family in al-Andalus between the 8th and 10th centuries AD.

The family traced itself back to an indigenous Iberian Christian who converted to Islam not long after the invasion of 711. His name, Sh...h, given by al-ʿUdhrī, cannot be fully reconstructed and is clearly non-Arabic. The first prominent member of the family mentioned by al-ʿUdhrī is Shabrīṭ, active on either side of 800. By then they were one of the most powerful families in the Upper March. The seat of Banū Shabrīṭ power was in Huesca and Barbastro was also under their control. Although initially allied with the Umayyad emirs of Córdoba, by the 10th century they had carved out for themselves an effectively autonomous zone between the Umayyad and Carolingian powers. As a result, they sometimes pursued alliances with Pamplona and the Christian counties of the Pyrenees. They also used non-Arabic names, like Fortūn. The most prominent member of the family was Muḥammad al-Ṭawīl, whose nickname means "long" or "tall".

== Family tree ==
| Banu Amrus |
| Banu Shabrit |
| Banu al-Tawil |

Sh....h
Rashid | Yusuf
Shabrit | Amrus ibn Yusuf
Abd Allah ibn Shabrit | Musa ibn Shabrit | Umar ibn Amrus | Yusuf ibn Amrus | Zakariyya ibn Amrus
Abd al-Malik ibn Abd Allah | Walid ibn Abd Allah | Isa ibn Musa | Zakariyya ibn Umar | Amrus ibn Umar | Umar ibn Zakariyya | Lubb ibn Zakariyya
Muhammad al-Tawil | Furtun ibn Abd al-Malik | Muhammad ibn Walid | Zakariyya ibn Isa | Asbag ibn Isa | Abd al-Malik ibn Isa | Mas'ud Ibn; Amrus
Abd al-Malik ibn al-Tawil | Amrus ibn al-Tawil | Furtun ibn al-Tawil | Musa Aznar ibn al-Tawil | Yahya ibn al-Tawil | Lubb ibn al-Tawil | Walid ibn al-Tawil
Abd al-Malik ibn Furtun | Abd al-Malik ibn Musa | Yahya ibn Lubb
Walid ibn Abd al-Malik

== Bibliography ==
- Viguera, María J. [in Spanish] (2000). "Ṭawīl, Banū". In Bearman, P. J.; Bianquis, Th.; Bosworth, C. E.; van Donzel, E. & Heinrichs, W. P. (eds.). The Encyclopaedia of Islam, Second Edition. Volume X: T–U. Leiden: E. J. Brill. p. 390. doi:10.1163/1573-3912_islam_SIM_7456. ISBN 978-90-04-11211-7.
