= Matruh =

Matruh may refer to:

- Matruh al-Arabi, governor of Barcelona from 778 to 792
- The Matrouh Governorate in Egypt
- Matruh, Yemen
- The Mediterranean harbor and naval port of Mersa Matruh in the Matrouh Governorate
