= Carlos Casado del Alisal =

Spanish Argentine businessman

Carlos Casado del Alisal (March 16, 1833 – June 29, 1899) was a Spanish Argentine businessman.

== Life and times ==
Carlos Casado del Alisal was born in Villada, Palencia Province, Spain. He arrived in Santa Fe Province, Argentina in 1857, and in 1864, was named to the Board of Directors of the newly established Central Argentine Railway by its chief stockholder, William Wheelwright. Serving in the Rosario City Council, he also established the Casado Bank in 1865, and Colonia Candelaria, an agricultural colony, in 1870; the latter was later reestablished as Casilda, in honor of his mother. He founded the Provincial Bank of Santa Fe in 1874, and purchased the highly indebted Colonia Caridad in 1878, redeveloping it as San Genaro (in honor of his daughter's patron saint, Saint Gennaro).

Casado arranged the first shipment of Argentine wheat to Europe in 1878; the 4,500 tons of wheat had been grown in Candelaria, and were shipped on April 12, 1878. He was subsequently named monetary policy adviser by President Nicolás Avellaneda, and helped direct national support toward the export of cereal at a time when leather and dried meats earned most of the nation's foreign exchange. President of the Bank of Santa Fe, he also sat on the boards of the Bank of the Province of Buenos Aires and the Mortgage Bank as the representative for Santa Fe Province stockholders from 1882. Casado founded the Santa Fe Western Railway in 1883, and the rail line would, by 1890, connect much of the agriculturally-rich province to the Port of Rosario and the Paraná River.

Following the Paraguayan War, in which Argentina annexed what became Formosa Province from Paraguay, Casado became of the new province's leading landowners. He died in Buenos Aires in 1899, at age 66.

Carlos Casado del Alisal was honored with a monument sculpted by Eduardo Barnes, and unveiled at the Rosario headquarters of the Provincial Bank of Santa Fe in 1970.

His brother was the Spanish painter José Casado del Alisal.
