= Bolskan =

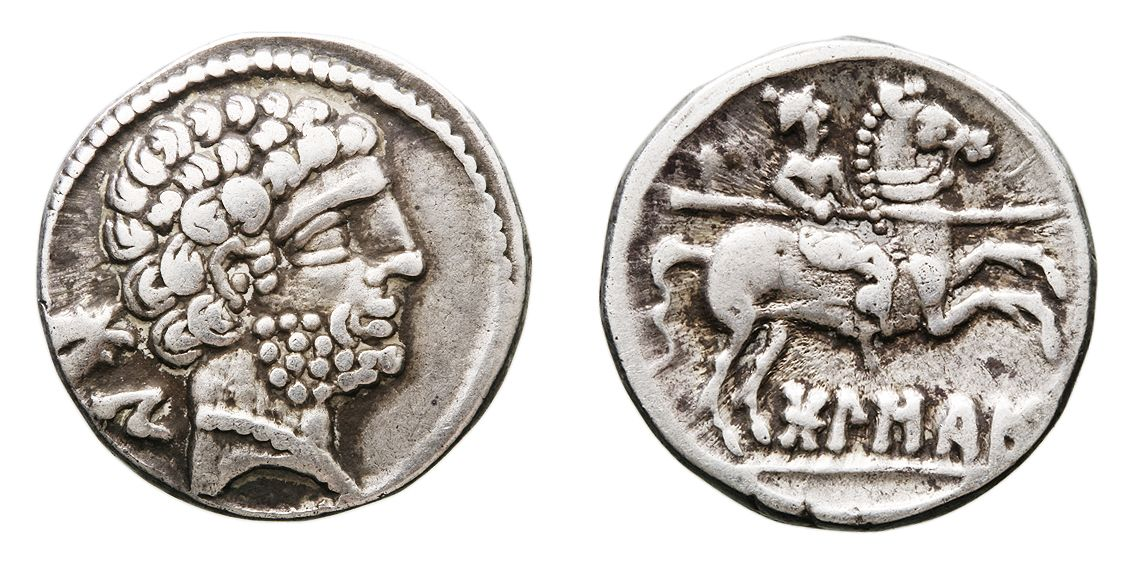
Silver denarius minted in Bolskan.

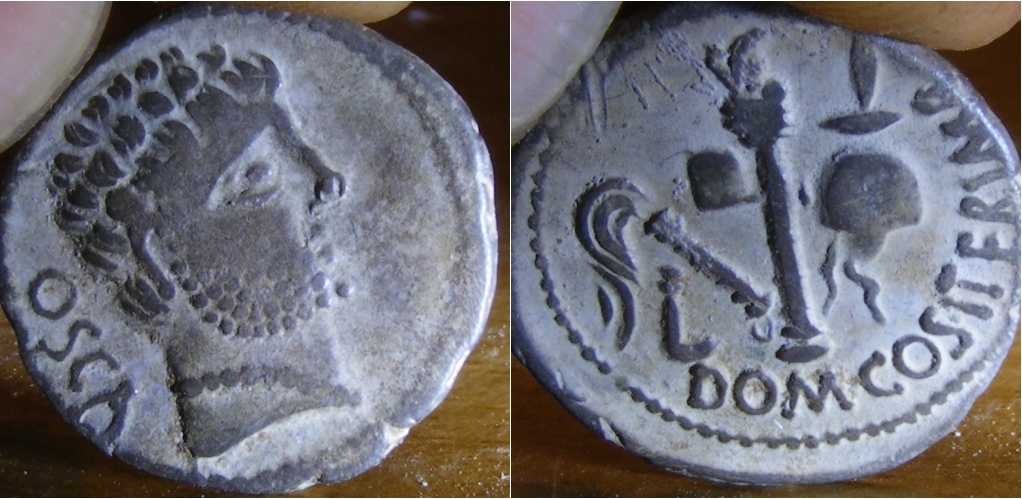
Silver denarius minted in Bolskan.

Bolskan was an Iberian city located in the territory of the Vescetani (an Iberian tribe) in north-eastern Spain about 65 km north of the Ebro River. It was on the site that is now occupied by the city of Huesca, in the Iberian Peninsula.

The territory occupied by the Vescetani was destroyed by Roman Praetor Gaius Terentius Varro in 179 BC, which saw the refoundation of the once-Iberian city, with the new name of Osca.

Bolskan is famous for its ancient mint, and its abundant coins include an issue that features an unidentified bearded male facing right on the obverse and a horseman carrying a spear. The name of the city is written (mostly) in the western Celtiberian script on the reverse. The coins of Bolskan changed in 37 BC, when the city was refounded as Osca. They now include the Latin inscriptions OSCA on the obverse and DOM. COS. ITER. IMP on the reverse, which were Denarii in denomination. The coins of both Bolskan and Osca are found within the Iberian coin collections of the British Museum
