= Bahlul ibn Marzuq =

Bahlul ibn Marzuq (Arabic: بهلول بن مرزوق) (died 802) was born in the current term of La Puebla de Castro (Huesca), was a Vascon-Muslim, the son of a local lord named Marzuq ibn Uskara ("son of the Basque"). He rebelled in Zaragoza against the Arab-Muslim government of Al-Andalus in 798, and in 800 conquered Huesca from the Banu Salama. His rebellion carried popular support, especially after public backing by theologian Ibn al-Mughallis. His exploits helped the Franks to conduct their siege and take Barcelona in 801. The emir sent the Huesca native, general Amrus ibn Yusuf, and Zaragoza and Huesca were retaken (c. 801). Bahlul fled to Pallars where he was killed by his lieutenant Khalaf ibn Rashid (802), who at the time held Barbitanya (Barbastro). The adventures of Bahlul were collected by the Muslim historian and geographer Ahmad ibn Umar al-Udri (1003–1085) in the popular epic poem written in Arabic known as "the archuza de Bahlul".
