= Khalaf ibn Rashid =

Jalaf ibn Rashid ibn Asad (Arabic: خلف بن راشد بن أسد) was a lieutenant of Bahlul ibn Marzuq, the rebel leader of the Zaragoza region in Spain, who conquered Huesca in 800.

When Bahlul was defeated by troops sent by the Spanish Wāli and fled to Pallars, he was killed by Jalaf ibn Rashid in 802. Recompensed by the government of Huesca and Barbitanya (region of Barbastro), Jalaf controlled Huesca for about sixty years (802–862) when it was transferred to the Banu Qasi and subsequently to Musa ibn Galindo, a scion of the Kings of Pamplona. Jalaf's family, the Banu Jalaf, continued to rule in Barbitanya for another two decades.
