= Banco Santa Fe =

Argentine bank

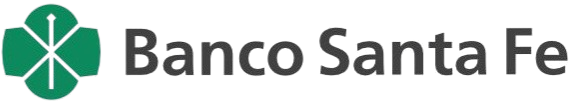
- Formerly: Nuevo Banco de Santa Fe
- Type: Sociedad Anónima
- Founded: 1974; 52 years ago as "Provincial Bank of Santa Fe"
- Headquarters: Santa Fe, Argentina
- Area served: Argentina
- Key people: Sebastián Eskenazi, President; Matías Eskenazi, Vice-President
- Products: Retail banking Offshore banking Mutual funds Trade finance Insurance; Mortgages; Consumer finance Credit cards
- Revenue: ▲US$ 1.3 billion (2012)
- Net income: ▲US$ 427 million (2012)
- Total assets: ▲US$ 11.6 billion (12/2012)
- Website: www.bancosantafe.com.ar

The New Bank of Santa Fe (Spanish: Nuevo Banco de Santa Fe, NBSF) is the most important financial entity in the Santa Fe Province, Argentina and has the largest territorial coverage that reaches 96 percent of the district's inhabitants. It is a commercial bank with national and regional capital (finance). It has the central house located in the capital city of the province and its administrative headquarters in Rosario, Argentina.

Former logo of the bank.

== History ==
Founded in 1874 and under the management of the Petersen Group since 2003, the Bank is an essential tool for the foreign trade operations of companies in the region. It participates in trade missions and owns a wide range of international payment and collection instruments.

Together with Bank of San Juan, the New Bank of Entre Ríos and Bank Santa Cruz, it forms the Bank San Juan Group, which is among the 10 main entities of the Argentine Financial System. Each of these banks are financial agents of their respective provinces of origin, where they lead in deposits and loans from the private sector, and maintain their rating for short-term debt at A1 (arg) and for long-term at AA− (arg) for its favorable performance, reflected in its capacity to generate profits, high liquidity and the quality of its portfolio. It has an extensive network of branches and agencies that facilitate operational management and ensure access to all corners of the region. They focus on the area of financial services to the private and public sectors, promoting and accompanying the growth of the different regional economic actors through a wide range of products and services and in conjunction with the government of the province. The Bank centralizes all of its assets in the province and controls strategic decisions and medium and long-term plans. The policies established by the Board of Directors to accompany, promote and sustain the growth of the provincial economy are reflected in the evolution of the market share, mainly in assistance to the non-financial private sector.

== Overview ==
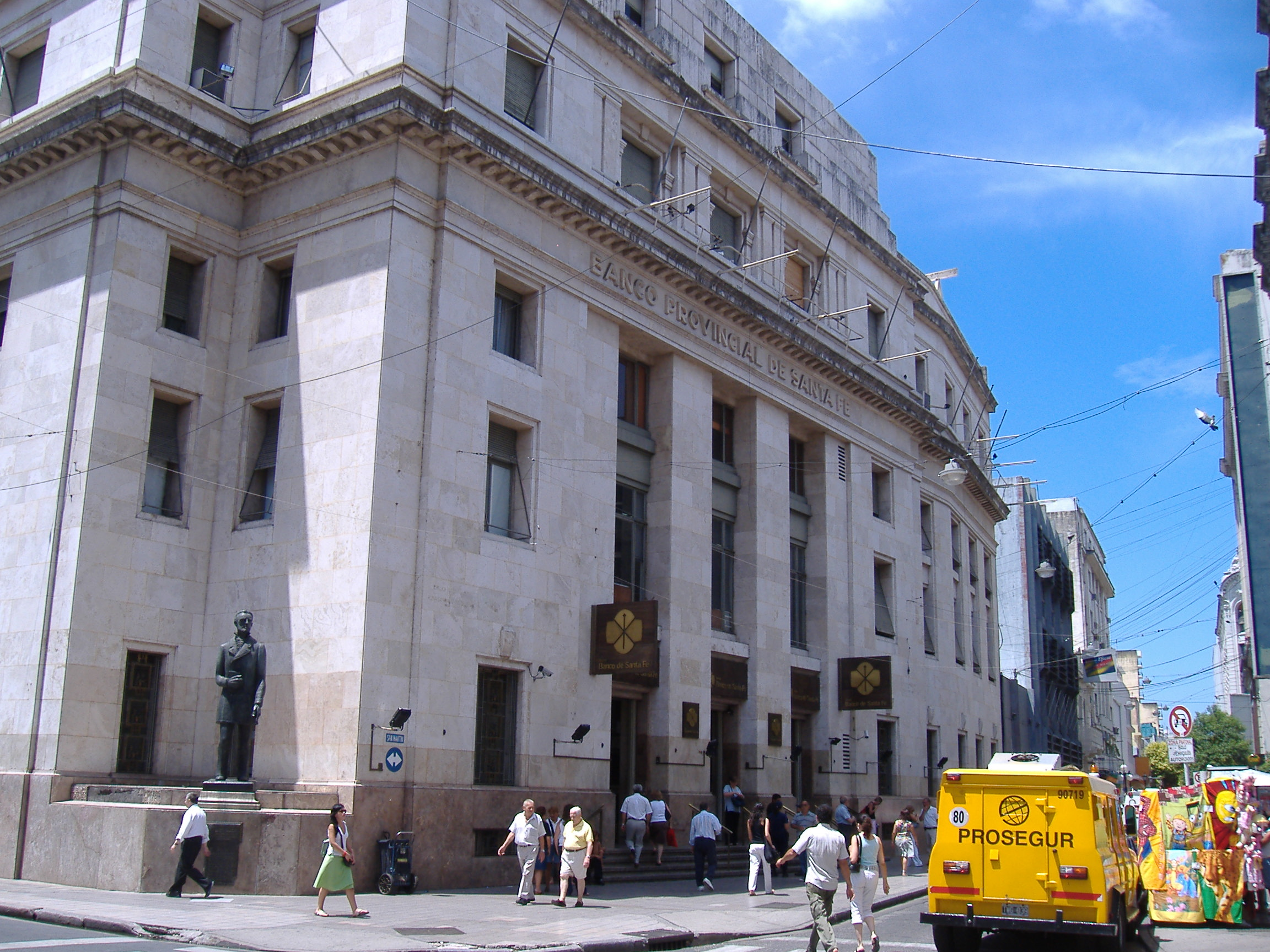
The central offices of the New Bank of Santa Fe in downtown Rosario

Originally named Provincial Bank of Santa Fe, it was established as a mixed state/private bank on 5 June 1874, based on an initiative of governor Servando Bayo, justified in the need to provide credit for the blossoming productive sector of the province. At the time, Argentina was starting to grow demographically (through immigration) and economically (through the exportation of agricultural products).

The bank's first Provisional Direction was composed of Carlos Casado del Alisal (presiding), Benjamín Ledesma, Manuel Carlés and Evaristo Machain, elected by vote, and Melitón Ibarlucea and Mariano Alvarado as representatives of the provincial government. Its capital was divided in 20,000 stocks: 10,000 for the government, 4,000 for the founders, and 6,000 to be freely acquired by the private business of Rosario, a major port city on the Paraná River. The bank opened simultaneously in Rosario and the provincial capital Santa Fe City on 1 September 1874.

On 12 July 1991 the Provincial Bank of Santa Fe became a joint stock company (sociedad anónima) with its majority share owned by the provincial state, and changed its name to Banco de Santa Fe SAPEM. The process was highly controversial and more than 5 years were needed for the privatization law to be voted successfully; the bank was finally privatized as Nuevo Banco de Santa Fe S.A. in 1997, and left under the control of the Banca General de Negocios (BGN), a financial group with participation of important international banks (the Chase Manhattan Bank, the Dresdner Bank and the Credit Suisse), managed by the brothers Carlos and José Rohm (the latter was the president of the NBSF). The Rohms were accused of money laundering in 2002, for which Carlos was arrested as he tried to flee the country, while his brother escaped.

The NBSF has its central offices and 8 branches in Rosario, 8 branches in Santa Fe City, and others in every department of Santa Fe Province. It also has offices in the Autonomous City of Buenos Aires and in Córdoba, Río Cuarto and Villa María.

== The Banco de Santa Fe Foundation ==
The Foundation promotes education and culture in the province of Santa Fe through research and technological innovation. It awards scholarships to students and trainings to teachers. Employees participate in the foundation through volunteering.
