= José Casado del Alisal =

Spanish painter (1830/32-1886)

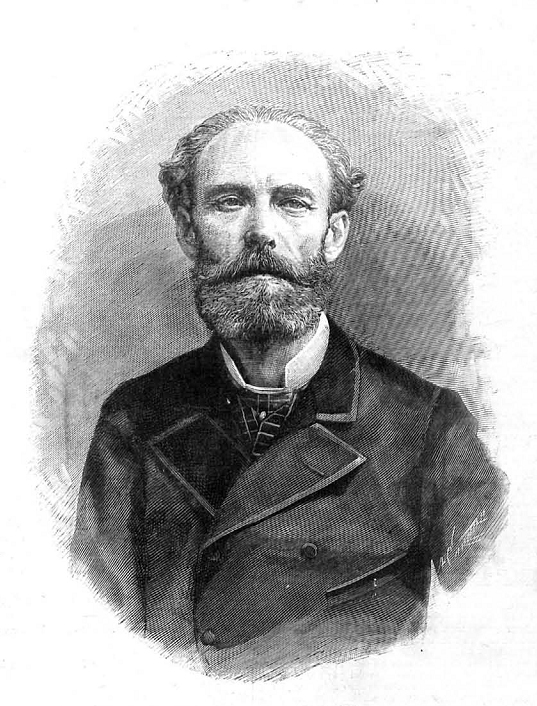
- José Casado del Alisal, in La Ilustración Española y Americana, 1886
- Born: 24 March 1831; Villada, Spain
- Died: 8 October 1886 (aged 55); Madrid, Spain
- Education: Escuela Municipal de Dibujo de Palencia

José María Casado del Alisal (24 March 1831 – 8 October 1886) was a Spanish portrait and history painter.

== Biography ==
He was born in Villada, and began his artistic education at the newly-established "Escuela Municipal de Dibujo de Palencia", which ultimately produced many well-known Spanish artists, and continued at the Real Academia de Bellas Artes de San Fernando, where he studied under Federico de Madrazo. In 1855, his painting "The Resurrection of Lazarus" won him a fellowship to study in Rome. He also stayed in Naples, Milan and Venice. His fellowship was extended in 1861, so he could continue his education in Paris, where he participated in the exposition of 1862 with his work "The Oath of the Cortes of Cádiz", which is currently on display in the Congress of Deputies. He was also awarded medals at the National Exhibitions of 1860 and 1864.

He became the first Director of the newly established Spanish Academy in Rome in January 1881, succeeding Eduardo Rosales who had been nominated but never occupied the position due to poor health. That same year, one of his best-known works, the "Bell of Huesca", failed to receive more than honorable mention at the Exhibition, which prompted him to resign his position as Director. Ironically, the following year, he was named a member of the jury that judged candidates applying for the fellowship to Rome. In 1885, he became a member of the San Fernando Academy. He died the following year in Madrid.

History paintings were his primary focus, although he also did portraits of many notable people, including Baldomero Espartero, Isabel II, Alfonso XII and Emilio Castelar y Ripoll. He drew his friend Gustavo Adolfo Bécquer lying on his deathbed, within a half-hour of Bécquer's death. Coincidentally, this occurred at the same time as a total solar eclipse, and the lighting effects the eclipse produced are represented in the final engraving.

His brother was the Spanish-Argentine businessman and economic advisor, Carlos Casado del Alisal.

== Selected paintings ==
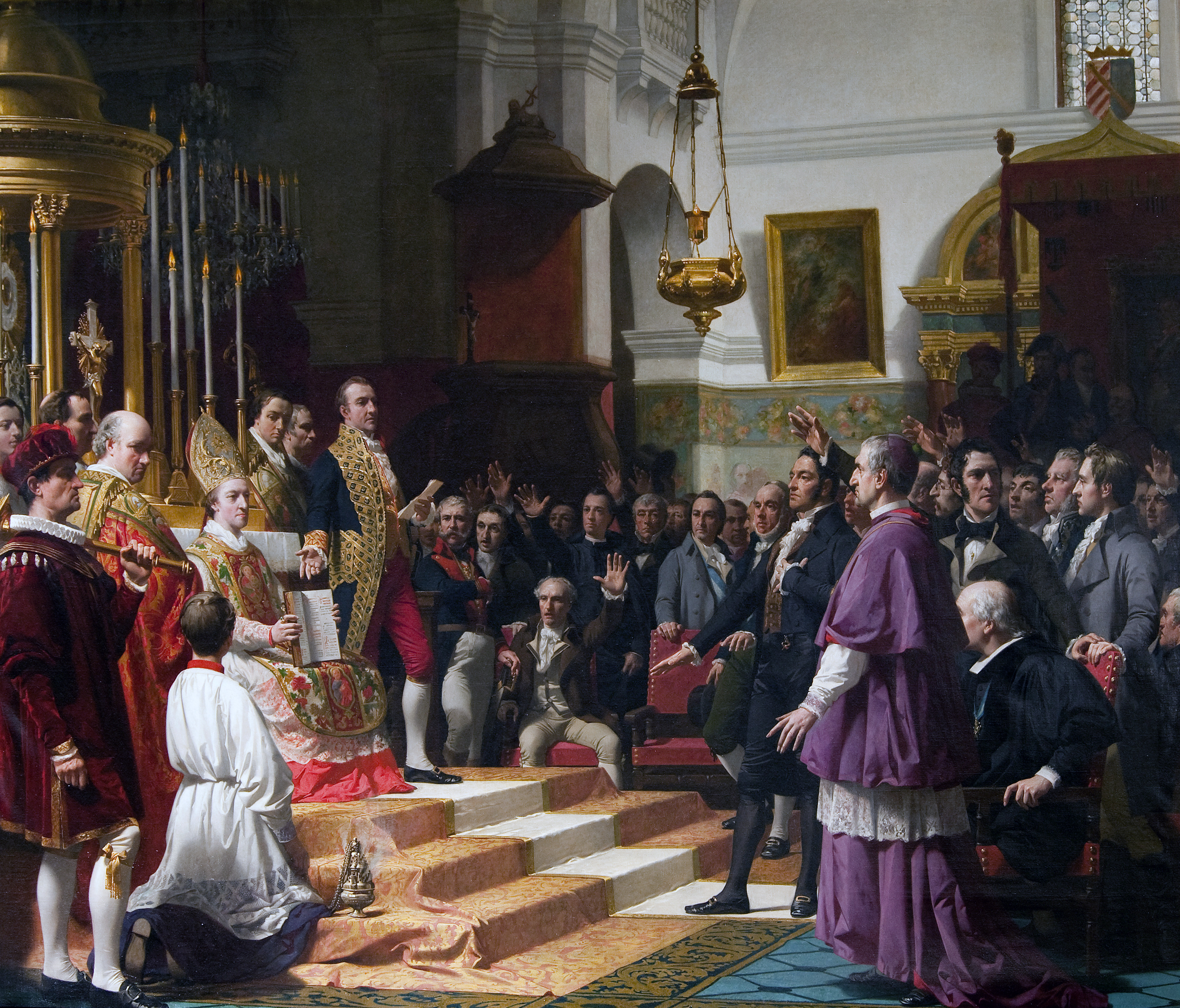
The Oath of the Cortes of Cádiz (1862)

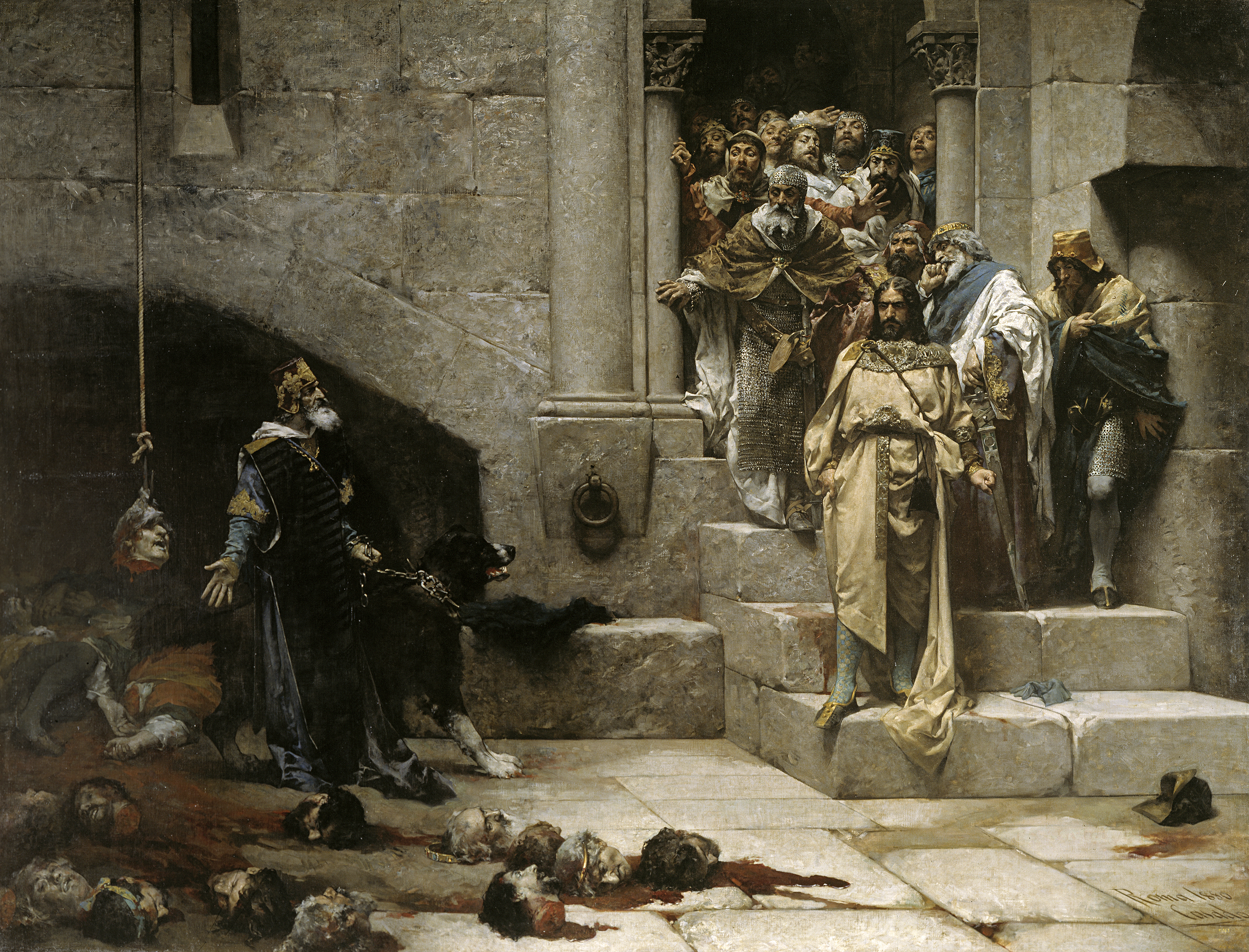
The Bell of Huesca (1880)

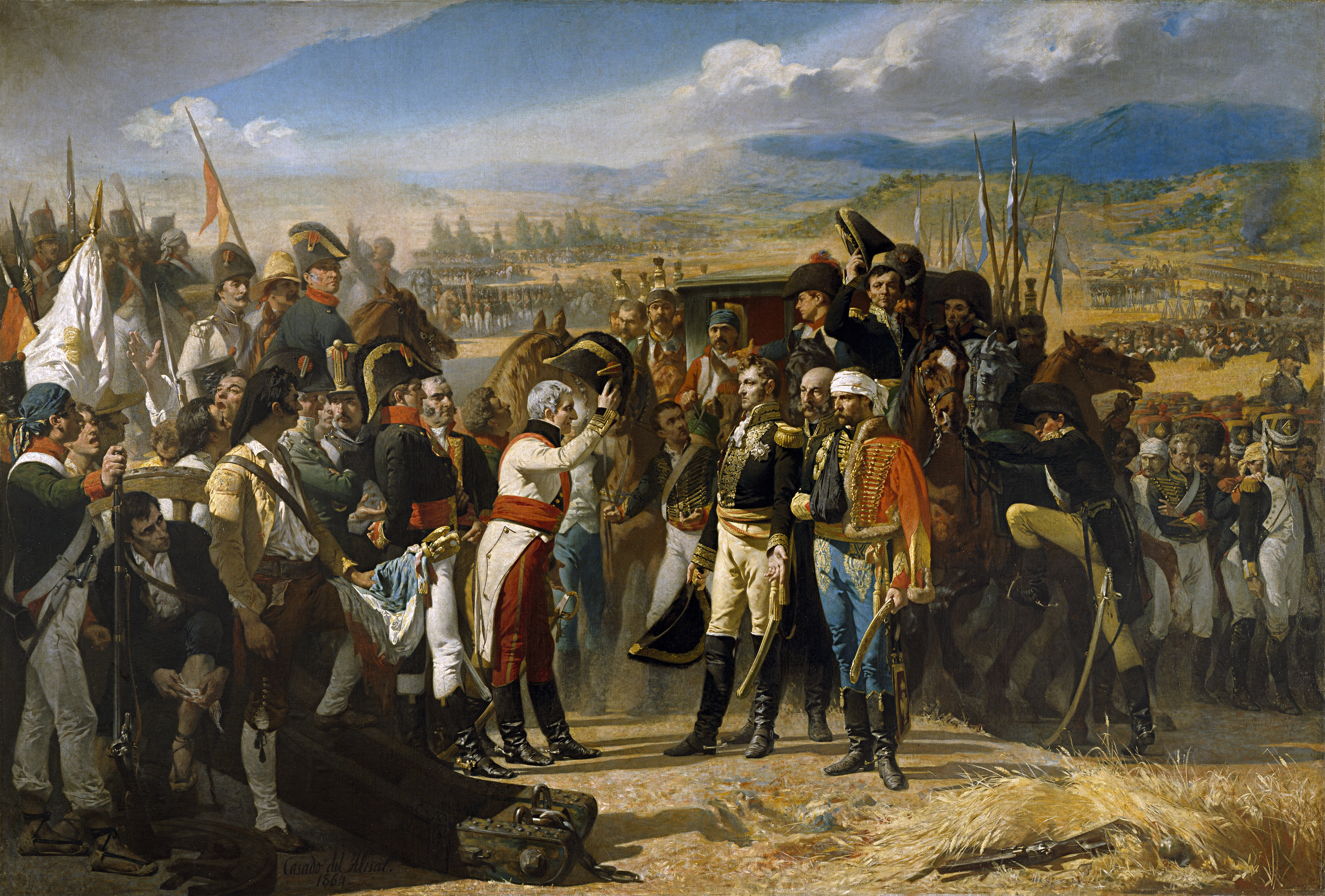
The Surrender at Bailén (1864)
