= Ximeno the Strong =

8th-century Spanish military cheiftain

- Born: c. 745
- Died: c. 805
- Occupation: chieftain
- Years active: 779-789
- Children: Íñigo Jiménez, García Jiménez
- Father: Garcí Ximénez of Sobrarbe

Ximeno (Jimeno) the Strong (Spanish: Jimeno el Fuerte) was an 8th-century military chieftain.

He rebelled against Abd al-Rahman I, the emir of Córdoba, to whom he had to submit in the year 781, promising to pay him the corresponding tribute. He was probably the son of the King Garcí Ximénez of Sobrarbe, and he had a brother, Fortún Garces. He had two sons, Íñigo and García Jiménez or Ximénez (names that are repeated in the Jiménez dynasty).
