= Bell of Huesca =

Ramiro II of Aragon legend

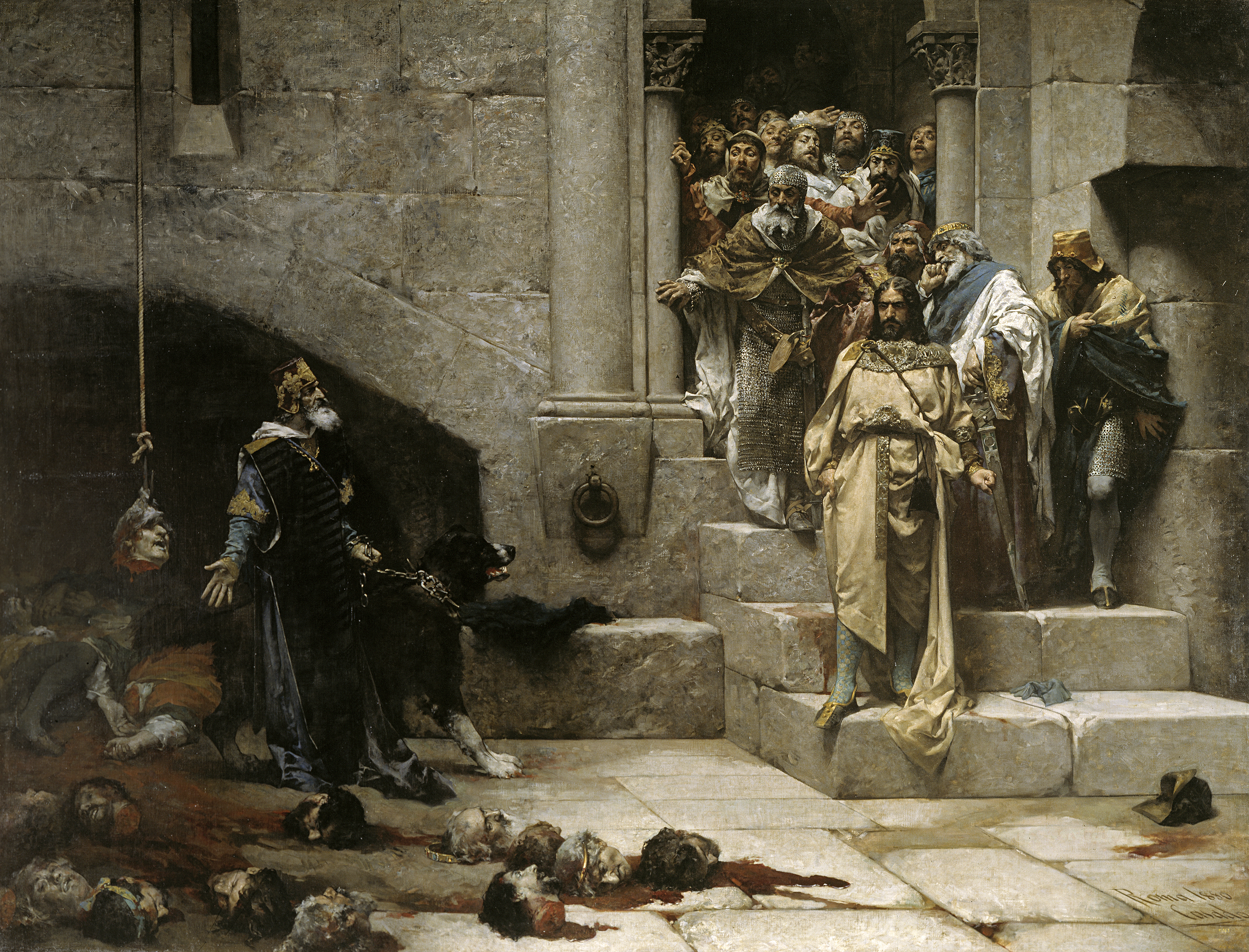
The Huesca Bell by José Casado del Alisal

The Bell of Huesca is a legend describing how Ramiro II of Aragon, the Monk, cut off the heads of twelve nobles who did not obey him. The legend is told in the 13th-century anonymous Aragonese work the Cantar de la campana de Huesca.

After Alfonso I of Aragon died in 1134, leaving no descendants, his brother Ramiro, bishop of Roda de Isábena, inherited the Kingdom of Aragón, then one of the states of the Iberian Peninsula. The kingdom was facing a number of other domestic and foreign problems at the time.

The Chronicle of San Juan de la Peña from the 14th century tells how Ramiro II became so concerned about his nobles abusing his patience that he sent a herald to the Abbey of Saint-Pons-de-Thomières to ask for advice from his former master.

The herald was shown the abbey garden where the old monk removed the heads from roses that stood out from the rest (in other versions of the story, the roses are replaced by cabbages). The herald is then told to tell the king what he has seen.

After the herald's return, Ramiro II sent a message to the chief noble, saying that he wanted help in order to build a bell that could be heard all over Aragón. As the nobles arrived, the king cut off their heads, building a circle with the heads, with the chief noble's head suspended as the bell clapper. The result was then shown as an example to others.
