= Matruh, Yemen =

Coordinates: 15°11′N 48°19′E

- Village
- Interactive map of Matruh, Yemen
- Country: Yemen
- Governorate: Hadhramaut
- District: Daw'an
- Time zone: UTC+3 (Yemen Standard Time)

Matruh is a village in eastern Yemen. It is located in the Hadhramaut Governorate.
