= Sulayman al-Arabi =

Umayyad governor of Barcelona and Girona (died 780)

Sulayman ibn Yaqzan al-Kalbi al-Arabi (al-A'rabi meaning the Bedouin; full name in Arabic: سليمان بن يقظان الكلبي الأعرابي) was an Arab Muslim wāli (governor) of Barcelona and Girona in the year 777.

For the history of al-Arabi, we must rely on the Muslim historian Abu al-Hassan Ali ibn Muhammad ibn Muhammad (1160–1233), also known as Ali ‘izz ad-Din ibn al-Athir al-Jazari (ibn al-Athir), who wrote four centuries after the fact.

When the Abbasid governor Abd al-Rahman ibn Habib al-Siqlabi landed near Murcia sometime before 777, he sent an invitation to al-Arabi to join him, but the governor of Barcelona refused. Al-Siqlabi then marched on Barcelona, but was defeated near Valencia.

According to ibn al-Athir, threatened by Abd ar-Rahman I, the Umayyad emir of Córdoba, al-Arabi sent a delegation to Charlemagne at the diet in Paderborn, offering his submission, together with the allegiance of Husayn of Zaragoza and Abu Taur of Huesca in return for military aid. As a result, Charlemagne marched across the Pyrenees toward Zaragoza in 778, joined by troops led by Sulayman.

Husayn of Zaragoza, however, refused to surrender the city, claiming that he had never promised Charlemagne his allegiance. After a month of siege Charlemagne decided to return to his kingdom, taking some hostages from his Muslim allies including Sulayman.

On his retreat, Charlemagne suffered an attack from the Basques in central Navarra. As a reprisal he attacked Pamplona, conquering it. However, on his retreat north his baggage train was ambushed at the battle of Roncevaux Pass August 15, 778. The children of Sulayman, Aysun al-Arabi and Matruh al-Arabi collaborated with the Basques in the assault which resulted in the release of their father.

Sulayman returned to Zaragoza where, in 780, he was killed by his former friend and ally Husayn of Zaragoza.

These historical events are assumed to be part of the factual nucleus around which was eventually formed, by centuries of oral tradition on the Christian side, the Song of Roland, which was to have an immense importance in the medieval culture of France and the whole of Christian Western Europe. It did not, however, make a comparable deep and lasting impression on the Muslim side.

Preceded by –	Wali of Barcelona; 777–778	Succeeded by Matruh al-Arabi
