= Villada =

Coordinates: 42°15′N 4°58′W

- municipality
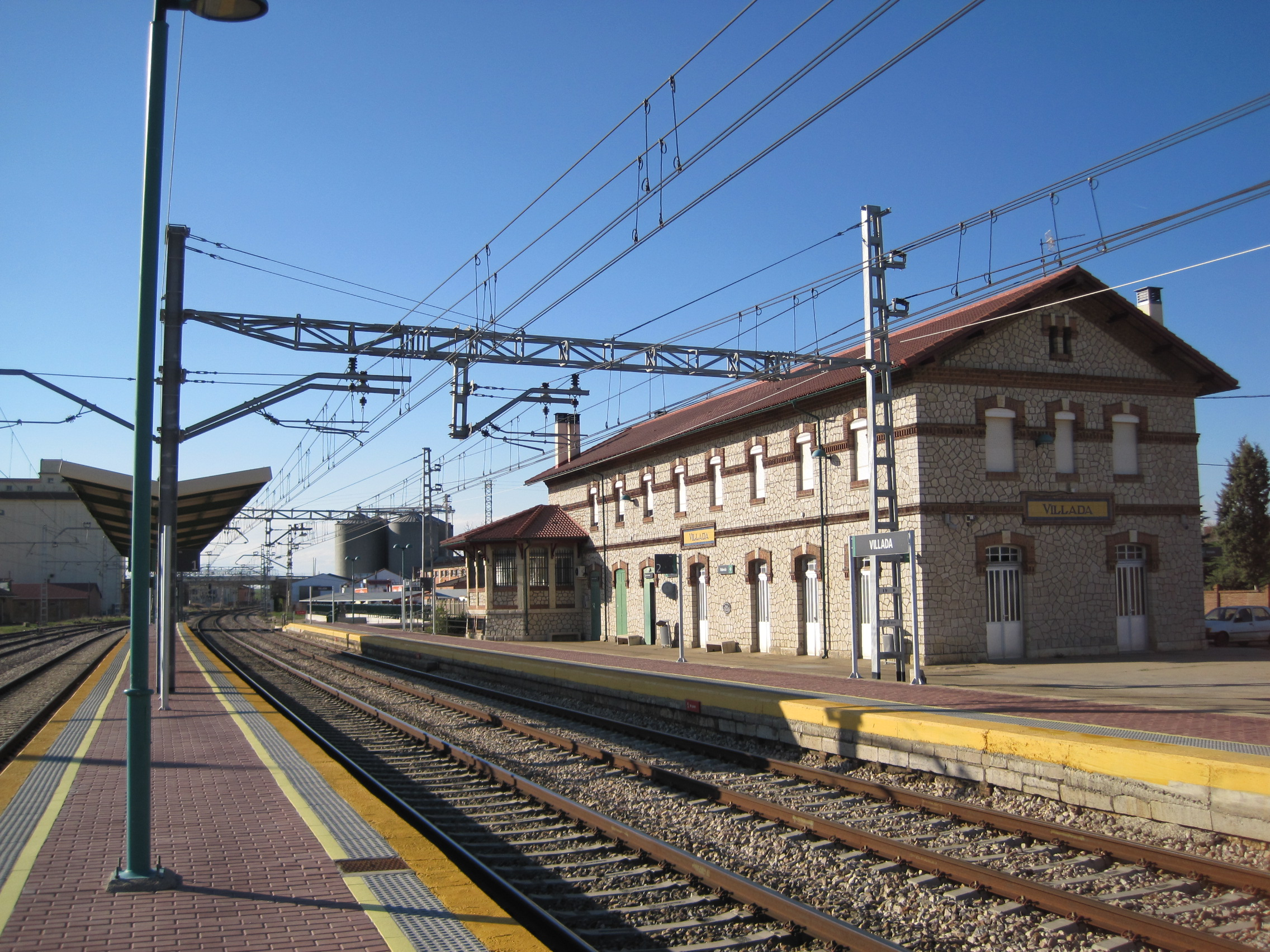

- Coat of arms
- Interactive map of Villada
- Country: Spain
- Autonomous community: Castile and León
- Province: Palencia

Area
  - Total: 64 km^{2} (25 sq mi)

Population (2025-01-01)
  - Total: 863
  - Density: 13/km^{2} (35/sq mi)
- Time zone: UTC+1 (CET)
  - Summer (DST): UTC+2 (CEST)
- Website: Official website

Villada is a municipality located in the province of Palencia, Castile and León, Spain. According to the 2018 census (INE), the municipality has a population of 963 inhabitants.
