= Battle of Roncevaux Pass =

8th-century battle in France

Coordinates: 43°01′12″N 01°19′26″W

- Part of the Charlemagne's campaign in the Iberian Peninsula
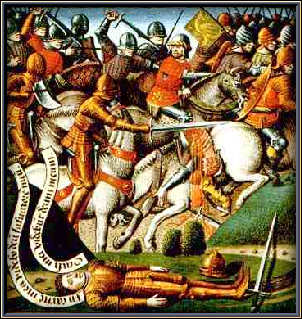
- 15th-century anonymous painting of the Battle of Roncevaux Pass
Date	15 August 778
Location	Roncevaux Pass in the Pyrenees
Result	Basque victory

Belligerents
Franks	Basques

Commanders and leaders
Charlemagne; Roland †	Unknown (speculated: Lupo II of Gascony, Ximeno the Strong or Bernardo del Carpio)

Strength
3,000 soldiers who were crossing the pass (modern est.)	Unknown, but large

Casualties and losses
All the men in the rearguard were killed	Unknown

The Battle of Roncevaux Pass (French and English spelling, Roncesvalles in Spanish, Orreaga in Basque) in 778 saw a large force of Basques ambush a part of Charlemagne's army in Roncevaux Pass, a high mountain pass in the Pyrenees on the present border between France and Spain, after his invasion of the Iberian Peninsula.

The Basque attack was in retaliation for Charlemagne's destruction of the city walls of their capital, Pamplona. As the Franks retreated across the Pyrenees back to Francia, the rearguard of Frankish lords was cut off, stood its ground, and was wiped out. Among those killed in the battle was Roland, a Frankish commander. His death elevated him and the paladins, the foremost warriors of Charlemagne's court, into legend, becoming the quintessential role model for knights and also greatly influencing the code of chivalry in the Middle Ages.

The Battle of Roncevaux Pass was the only significant defeat of Charlemagne in his military career, and for future campaigns he would never take it upon himself to lead an army to battle in Spain, having to rely instead on his generals. There are numerous written works about the battle, some of which change and exaggerate events. The battle is recounted in the 11th century The Song of Roland, the oldest surviving major work of French literature, and in Orlando Furioso, one of the most celebrated works of Italian literature. Modern adaptations of the battle include books, plays, works of fiction, and monuments in the Pyrenees.

== Background ==
With the rise of the Carolingians and Pepin the Short's war on Aquitaine, the Duchy of Aquitaine led by Waifer was defeated and the Franks encroached farther into the duchy. The Basques (Vascones, Wascones) of the Duchy of Vasconia, one of the mainstays of the Aquitanian army, submitted to Pepin in 766 and 769, but the territory south of the Garonne remained largely unscathed and self-governed. However, as of 778 Charlemagne expanded Frankish takeover of Aquitaine to present-day Gascony, by appointing trusted Franks, Burgundians, and Church officials in key regional positions and establishing counties, such as Fezensac, Bordeaux, and Toulouse, on the left bank of the Garonne.

Sulayman al-Arabi, the pro-Abbasid Wali (governor) of Barcelona and Girona, sent a delegation to Charlemagne, Master of the Franks in Paderborn, offering his submission, along with the allegiance of Husayn of Zaragoza and Abu Taur of Huesca in return for military aid. Their Lords had been cornered in the Iberian peninsula by Abd ar-Rahman I, the Umayyad emir of Córdoba. The three rulers also conveyed that the caliph of Baghdad, Muhammad al-Mahdi, was preparing an invasion force against Abd ar-Rahman.

Seeing an opportunity to extend Christendom and his own power, Charlemagne agreed to go to Spain. Al-Arabi induced him to invade al Andalus by promising him an easy surrender of its Upper March, of which Zaragoza was the capital. Following the sealing of this alliance at Paderborn, Charlemagne marched across the Pyrenees in 778 "at the head of all the forces he could muster". Charlemagne led the Neustrian army over Vasconia into the Western Pyrenees, while the Austrasians, Lombards, and Burgundians passed over the Eastern Pyrenees through Catalonia. His troops were welcomed in Barcelona and Girona by Sulayman al-Arabi. As he moved towards Zaragoza, the troops of Charlemagne were joined by troops led by al-Arabi, before eventually putting the city under siege.

Abd ar-Rahman of Córdoba sent his most trusted general, Thalaba Ibn Obeid, to take control of the possibly rebellious city and to prevent the Frankish invasion. Husayn and Ibn Obeid clashed repeatedly; eventually Husayn managed to defeat and to imprison Ibn Obeid. Reinforced in his autonomous position, Husayn became reluctant to yield his new privileged status to the Frankish monarch and refused to surrender the city to Charlemagne, claiming that he had never promised Charlemagne his allegiance. He seems to have tried to appease Charlemagne by giving him the prisoner General Ibn Obeid and a large tribute of gold, but Charlemagne was not easily satisfied, putting Sulayman al-Arabi in chains. Meanwhile, the force sent by the Baghdad caliphate seems to have been stopped near Barcelona. Though Charlemagne's forces initially held the upper hand, the siege of Zaragoza dragged on for over a month. Eventually a deal was struck between Charlemagne and Husayn. The latter would pay gold and the release of several prisoners, while the Franks in return would withdraw their siege.

== Battle ==
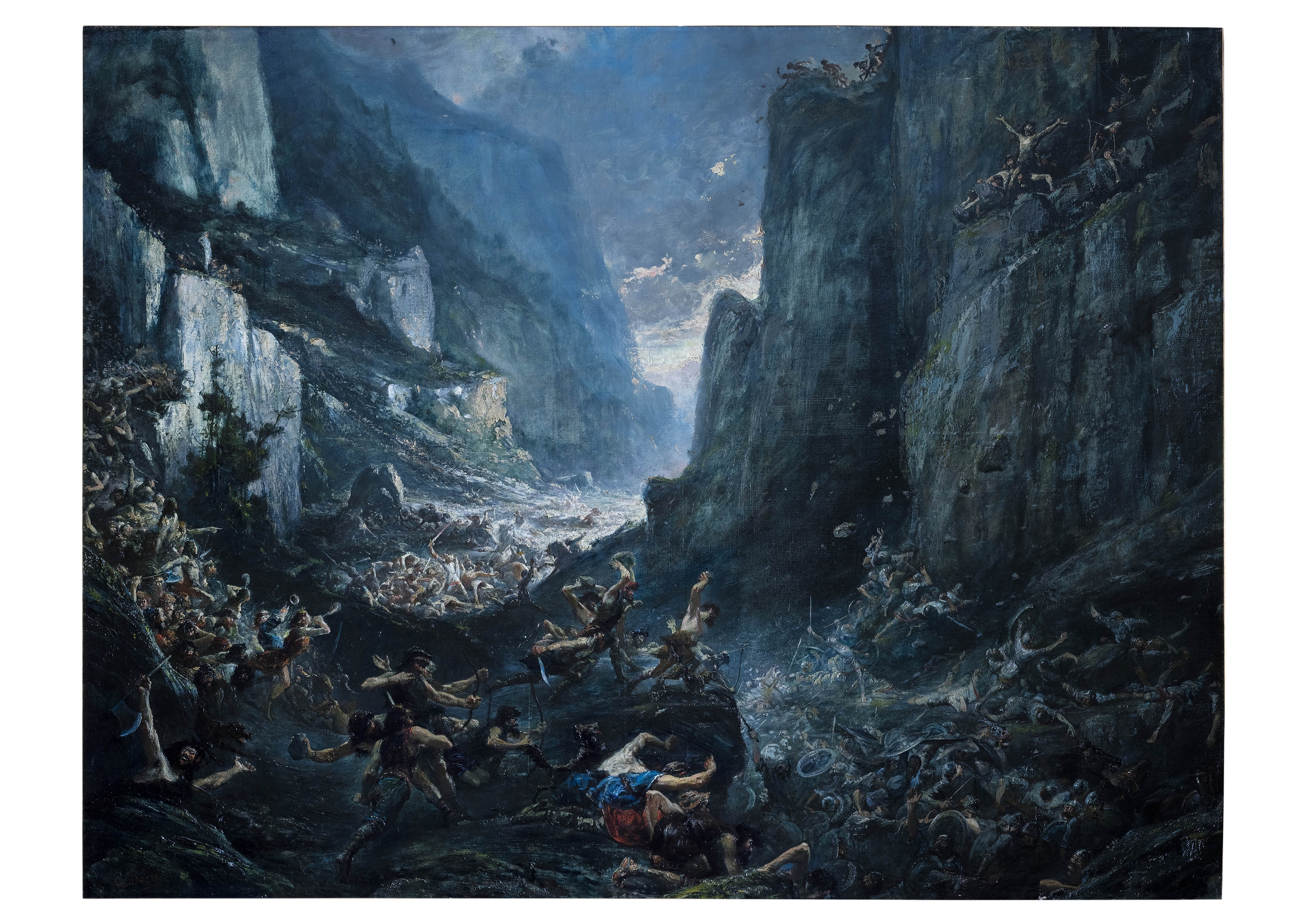
Roland à Roncevaux (c. 1877), painting by Gustave Doré depicting an idealized vision of the Battle of Roncevaux Pass

Before leaving the Iberian Peninsula, Charlemagne decided to further secure his hold on the Basque territory (Wasconia). He first eliminated any possible opposition from the natives of the region (the Basque tribes), believing that many of them were allied with the Moors. He gave orders to tear down the walls of the Basque capital Iruña, possibly fearing that it could be used for future conflicts. Some primary sources suggest that he destroyed the city altogether, and many towns in the region were also razed. Garrisons and military outposts were placed throughout the territory, and there were accounts of the Franks' harsh treatment of the Basques during their occupation.

After securing the region, Charlemagne marched for the Pyrenees mountain pass to return to France. Many of his notable lords, such as Roland, military governor of the Breton March, and Eggihard, Mayor of the Palace, were placed in the rearguard probably to protect the retreat and the baggage train. Unknown to Charlemagne, the enraged Basques sent their warriors in pursuit of him and his army in retaliation for the destruction of their city, and the Basques' knowledge of the region helped them overtake the Franks.

In the evening of August 15, Charlemagne's rearguard was suddenly attacked by the Basques as they crossed the mountain pass. The Franks were caught off guard by the surprise attack, with their army in confusion and disarray as they tried to escape the ambush. The Basques managed to cut off and isolate the Frankish rearguard and the baggage train from the rest of the escaping army, and although the Basques were not as well-equipped, they held the upper ground and the knowledge of the terrain that gave them a huge advantage in the skirmish. As Charlemagne tried to regroup and evacuate his army, Roland and the others held for a considerable length of time before the Basques finally massacred them completely. Though killed to the last man, the rearguard nonetheless succeeded in allowing Charlemagne and his army to continue to safety. The Basques then looted the baggage that was left behind and took advantage of the darkness to flee, leaving no trace for the Franks to follow the following morning. The revised version of the Annales Regni reads:

Having decided to return, [Charlemagne] entered the mountains of the Pyrenees, in whose summits the Vascones had set up an ambush. They attacked the rearguard, causing confusion which spread to all the army. And, while the Franks were superior to the Vascones both in armament and in courage, the roughness of the terrain and the difference in the style of combat made them generally weaker. In this battle were killed the majority of the paladins that the King had placed in command of his forces. The baggage was sacked, and suddenly the enemy vanished, thanks to their knowledge of the terrain. The memory of the injury so produced overshadowed in the King's heart that of the feats done in Hispania.

=== Basque army ===
One of the principal units of the Vascones was the guerrilla army of the Basques. A later source, the anonymous Saxon Poet, talks of the Basque spears, agreeing with the Pyrenean and Basque tradition much later among the almogavars. A typical Basque mountain warrior was armed with two short spears and a knife or short sword as his main weapons, and bows or javelins for missile weapons. He would not normally wear armour. Pierre de Marca, a Béarnese author, suggests that the attackers were a reduced number of mostly local Low Navarrese, Souletines, and Baztanese, whose main motivation may have been plunder. The Vascones had a history of resisting Carolingian rule since the incursion of Frankish king Pepin the Short, which saw the defeat of Waiofar, the last independent Duke of Aquitaine.

The accounts of Einhard and Pierre de Marca suggest that the perpetrator of the attack was Lupo II of Gascony. He held the territory of the Pyrenees, making him responsible for the tragedy that happened in his realm. Regions surrounding his kingdom such as Bordeaux were under the control of the Carolingians. While the Duke did pay homage to Charlemagne by offering Hunald II (a rebel leader and a possible heir to Waiofar) and his wife to him, there were disputes over the trans-Pyrenean Basque lands ruled by Lupo and those under Carolingian suzerainty. The authors of the General History of Languedoc also believed in the same theory that the Duke was the leader of the attack. Their reasons were that he and the Vascones opposed Carolingian expansion into Vasconia after the Franco-Aquitanian war (760–769).

=== Location ===
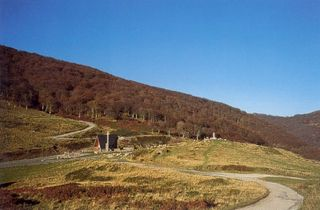
Ibaneta (Roncevaux) pass

Map of the roads in Hispania. The pass of Roncesvaux is located on the Ab Asturica Burdigalam road that started in Castra Legiones to Benearnum and meets Burdigala.

The Spanish March and surrounding regions during the time of Charlemagne. Roncevaux Pass (labeled Roseida Vallis on this map) is to the northeast of Pamplona (Pampilona)

The Pyrenees are a mountain range that form a natural border between France and Spain, extending about 490 km (305 mi) from Cape Higuer on the Bay of Biscay, to Cap de Creus on the Mediterranean Sea. Suggested places where the battle could have taken place, range from Navarre and Aragon to as far as Catalonia.

The mainstream opinion is that the battle took place somewhere not far from Roncevaux itself, as it is not just on one of the easiest routes but also the traditional one. Indeed, the Roman road Via ab Asturica Burdigalam which started in Castra Legiones (modern León) and went to Benearnum (mod. Lescar), crossed the Pyrenees through Roncevaux. However, the historical Roman road (also called the Route of Napoleon) followed a route different from the modern one, not crossing at Ibañeta (the traditional location) but heading up eastwards and crossing instead the Lepoeder and Bentartea passes – next to mount Astobizkar – not far from mount Urkulu, identified as the Summum Pyreneum of the classic Roman sources.

== Aftermath ==
The death of Roland and his men

Charlemagne biographer Einhard stated that the men in the rear were "massacred to the last man." The Vita Karoli mentions the names of the most important lords killed such as Eggihard, Roland, and Anselmus, the count palatine. The battle caused numerous losses among the Frankish troops, including several of the most important aristocrats and the sack of the baggage, probably with all the gold given by the Muslims at Zaragoza.

While the skirmish was a small setback, Charlemagne did lose huge quantities of treasure and good men. It was the only significant defeat that Charlemagne ever suffered in his otherwise successful military career. Never again would Charlemagne take it upon himself to lead an army to battle in Spain, having to rely instead on his generals for future campaigns in the Iberian Peninsula. The Franks failed to capture Zaragoza and suffered a significant loss at the hands of the Vascones, but Charlemagne would return to establish the Marca Hispanica, to serve as a buffer region between his Christian empire and the Muslims to the south. A decade later the Franks finally captured Barcelona. He would also later establish the Kingdom of Aquitaine with the son of Louis the Pious as its first king. Land in the Pyrenees would be overseen by Carolingian officials, and distributed among colonisers and to the Spanish Church who were allied to Charlemagne. A Christianization program was put in place across the high Pyrenees. The Basques would continue their rebellion to Carolingian rule until the appointment of William of Gellone, who would dissolve their rebellion after capturing and exiling Lupo's son and Basque leader Adalric in 790.

Zaragoza, however, remained a Muslim city and capital of the Upper March, and later of an independent emirate until the 11th century. Pamplona itself would remain in the hands of the Muslims until a rebellion in 798–801 expelled them as well. The Vascones would finally consolidate the Banu Qasi realm and eventually the constitution of the independent Kingdom of Pamplona in 824 after the birth of a new resistance to Carolingian rule. In that same year, the Basque army defeated another Carolingian army in the same mountain pass. The second Battle of Roncevaux Pass was almost identical to the first, with the Basques again taking advantage of the terrain, but against a much larger Frankish force. Unlike the first battle in which Charlemagne's army managed to escape, the Carolingians led by Count Aeblus were trapped and routed, and a larger number of their men were slaughtered than those of Charlemagne. Frankish vassals Aeblus and Aznar were captured by the joint forces of Iñigo Arista's Pamplona and of the Banu Qasi, consolidating the independence of both realms.

== Legacy ==
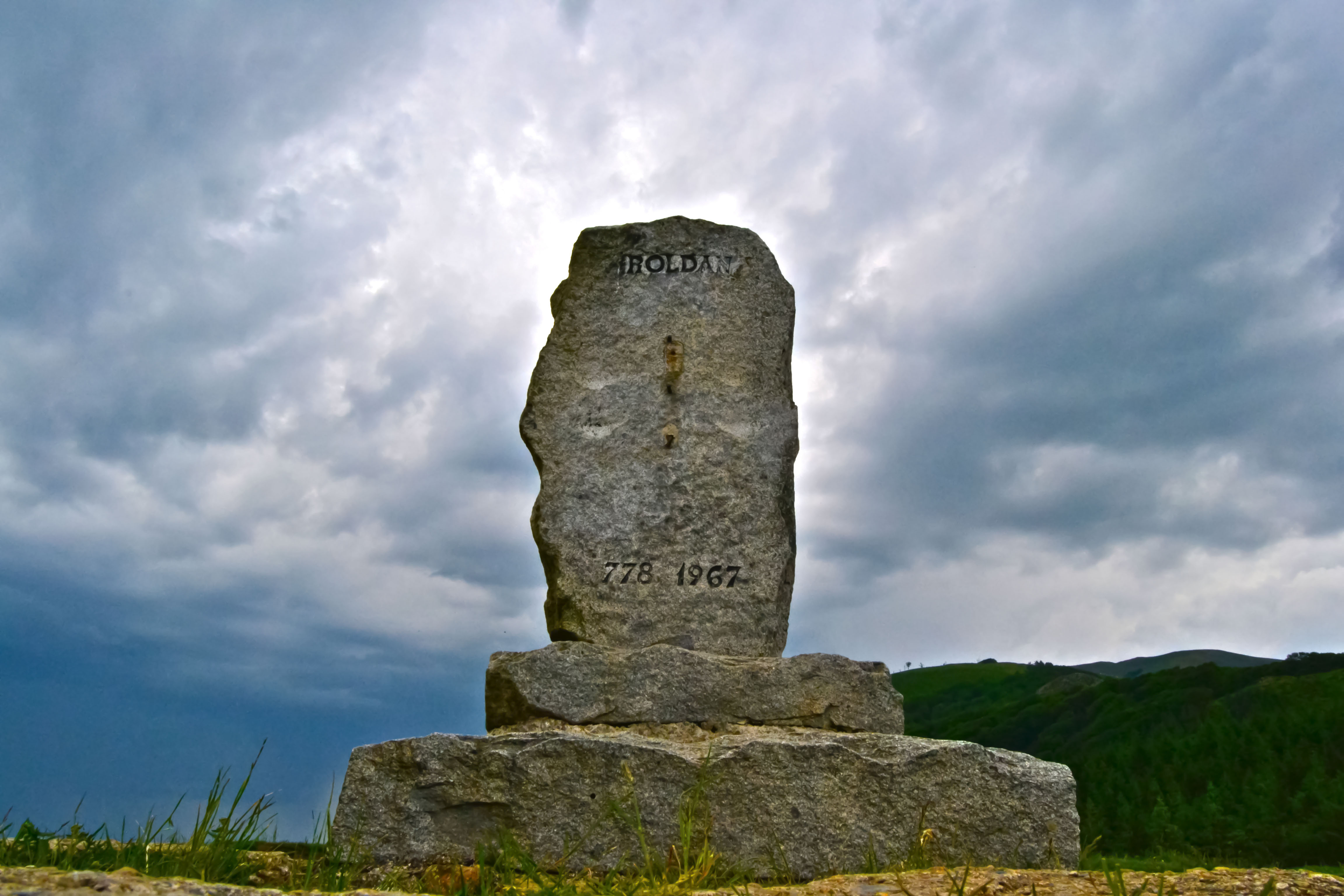
Monument of the Battle of Roncesvalles Pass. Note that Roland's name is spelled in its Spanish version "Roldan".

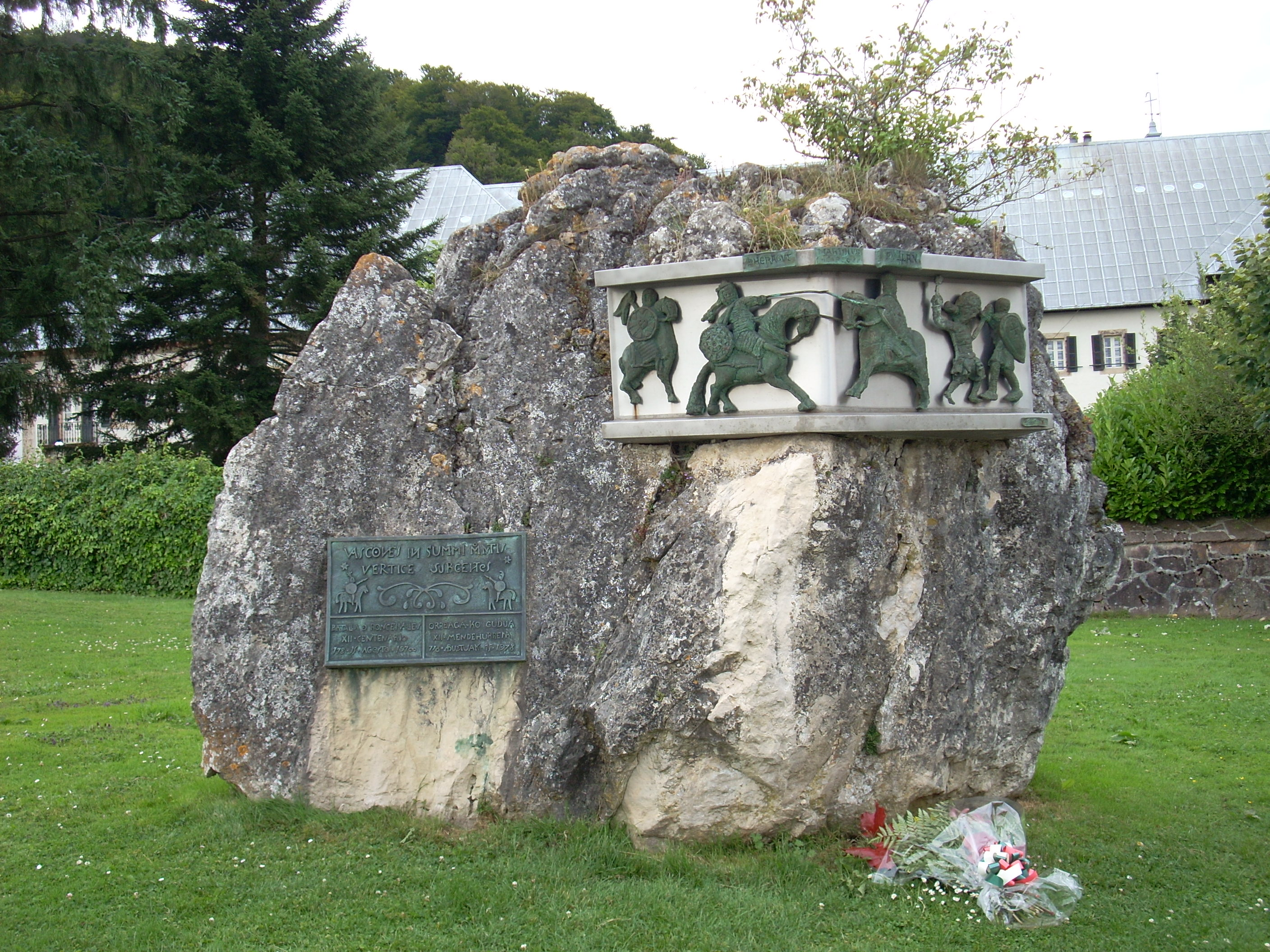
Monument commemorating the 12th centenary of the Battle of Roncevaux Pass, Roncesvalles, Navarre, Spain.

Over the years, this battle was romanticized by oral tradition into a major conflict between Christians and Muslims although in fact, the Basques of the period were mainly pagans and Charlemagne had been allied to some of the Muslims. In the tradition, the Basques are replaced by a force of 400,000 Saracens, and mythical objects such as Durendal and Oliphant were also added. Although Roland died in the battle with little information about him, the battle popularized him as a chivalric hero of honor in the Middle Ages.

The Song of Roland, which commemorates the battle, was written by an unknown poet of the 11th century. It is the earliest surviving of the chansons de geste or epic poems of medieval France written in Old French. Together with the Knights of the Round Table in Britain, the story of Roland and the paladins have become the archetypal icons of chivalry in Europe; greatly influencing knightly culture and inspiring many Christian warriors that came after. During the Battle of Hastings in 1066, knights and soldiers under William the Conqueror, chanted the poem to inspire themselves before their fight with the Anglo-Saxons.

The English expression, "to give a Roland for an Oliver", meaning either to offer a quid pro quo or to give as good as one gets, which is referenced directly from the companionship of Roland and Oliver during the battle. One example was said during the Combat of the Thirty in 1351; a judicial combat between two groups of knights during the Breton War of Succession. The knights were described by the French author Jean Froissart as "if they had been all Rolands and Olivers," which admired their honor and companionship in battle. Memorials have also been erected to commemorate the battle, such as the Roncesvalles Pass Monument in Navarre, Spain. Roland's Breach, situated in the Ordesa y Monte Perdido National Park, is a gap thought to have been caused by Roland while fighting. At the summit of the Roncevaux Pass are the remains of an early chapel of San Salvador also known as Charlemagne's Chapel and the Charlemagne Monument built in 1934; both built to commemorate the Emperor's campaign in the region.

The song is also commemorated in the Italian literary classic Orlando Furioso. The battle is also referenced in the song "Roncevaux" by Van der Graaf Generator, originally recorded in 1972 but only released in rather rough form many years later on the album Time Vaults. The battle and Orlando's sacrifice inspired several composers, amongst whom were Claudio Monteverdi, Jean-Baptiste Lully, Antonio Vivaldi and George Frideric Handel, who composed an Italian-language opera with Orlando. Modern adaptations of the battle drew heavily on the romanticized versions. A 1978 French film La chanson de Roland features an adaptation of the Song of Roland and features the battle as depicted in the poem. The battle is also featured minimally in the graphic novel The League of Extraordinary Gentlemen: Black Dossier, in which Roland is named Orlando, an amalgamation of fictional characters that were named Roland and Orlando.

== See also ==
- Duchy of Vasconia
- Kingdom of Navarre
- Roland's Breach
