= Husayn of Zaragoza =

Governor of Zaragoza from 774 to 781

Husayn of Zaragoza (in the Arabic sources Al Hossain ibn Yahia al Ansari ibn Saad al Obadi and حسين بن يحي الانصاري Ḥusayn ibn Yaḥyà al-Anṣārī o الحسين بن يحي الانصاري Al-Ḥusayn ibn Yaḥyà al-Anṣārī) was a descendant of Sa'd ibn Ubadah the companion of Muhammad, and the Wali (governor) of Zaragoza from 774 to 781.

== Events during the rule of Husayn ==
- In 774 Husayn conspired with the Qahtanite aristocracy against the emir, proclaiming the rule of the Abbasid Caliphate in Hispania. In response, the emir sent general Abd al-Melek bin Umar, who obtained the allegiance of Abu Taur of Huesca and the Wali of Tudela, but who was rejected in Zaragoza.
- In 777, the Wali of Barcelona, Sulayman al-Arabi (Sulayman ibn Yaqdhan al-Kalbi in the Arabic sources) offered Charlemagne his own allegiance and the allegiance of Husayn in Paderborn. But when in 778 Charlemagne arrived in Zaragoza, Husayn denied any promise. As Charlemagne could not take the city, he withdrew after a month, which then led to the Battle of Roncevaux Pass. In 780 Husayn had Sulayman al-Arabi killed after he returned to Zaragoza.
- In 781 the Emir Abd ar-Rahman I sent general Tsalaba ben Obaid to re-take Zaragoza for the Caliphate. After a long siege, Husayn agreed to a truce. His son, Said bin Husayn, was given to the Emir as a hostage.

According to the historian al-Nuwayri, Husayn was killed soon after his surrender.
