= Huesca =

Huesca Uesca (Aragonese)
- Municipality
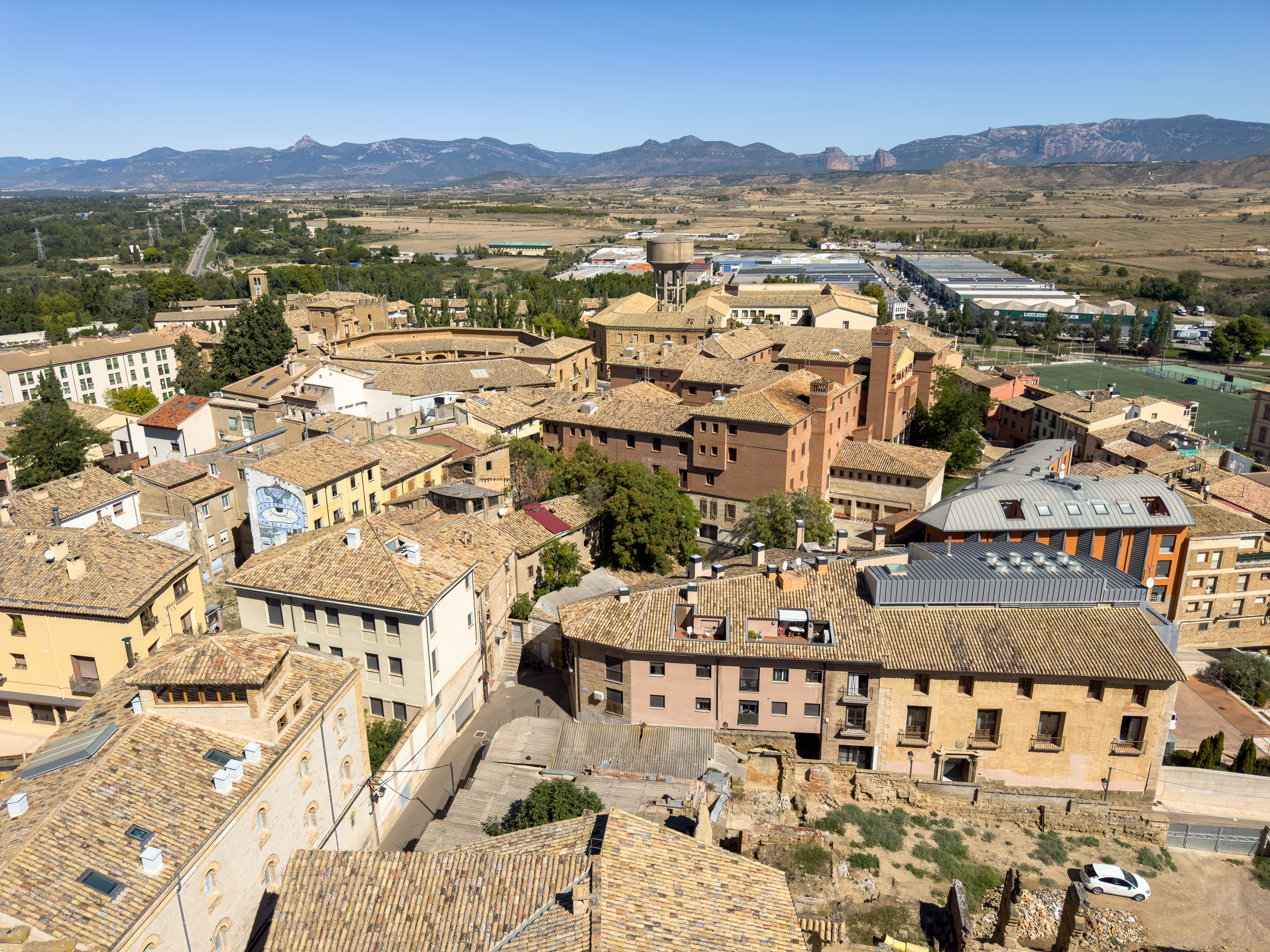
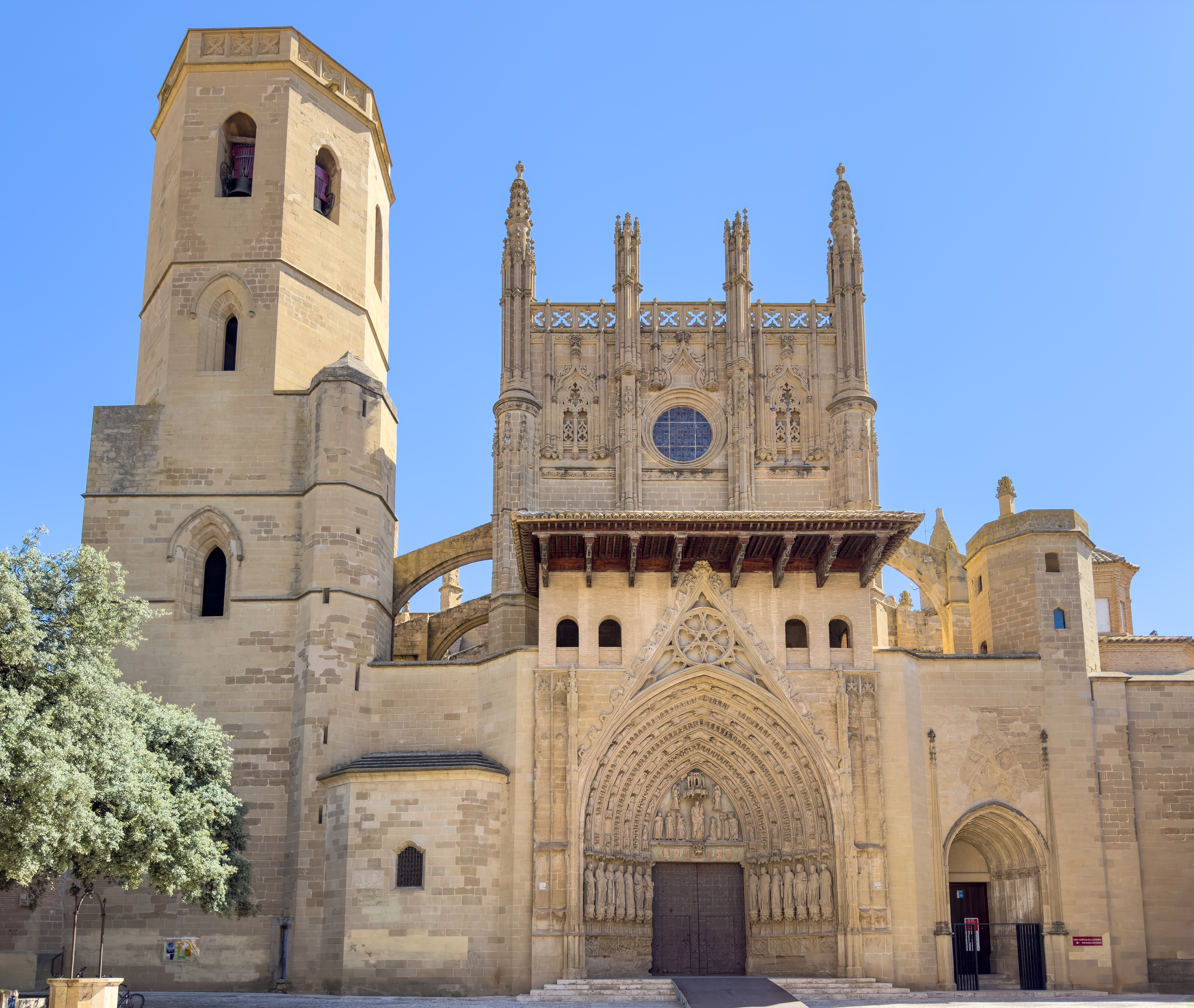
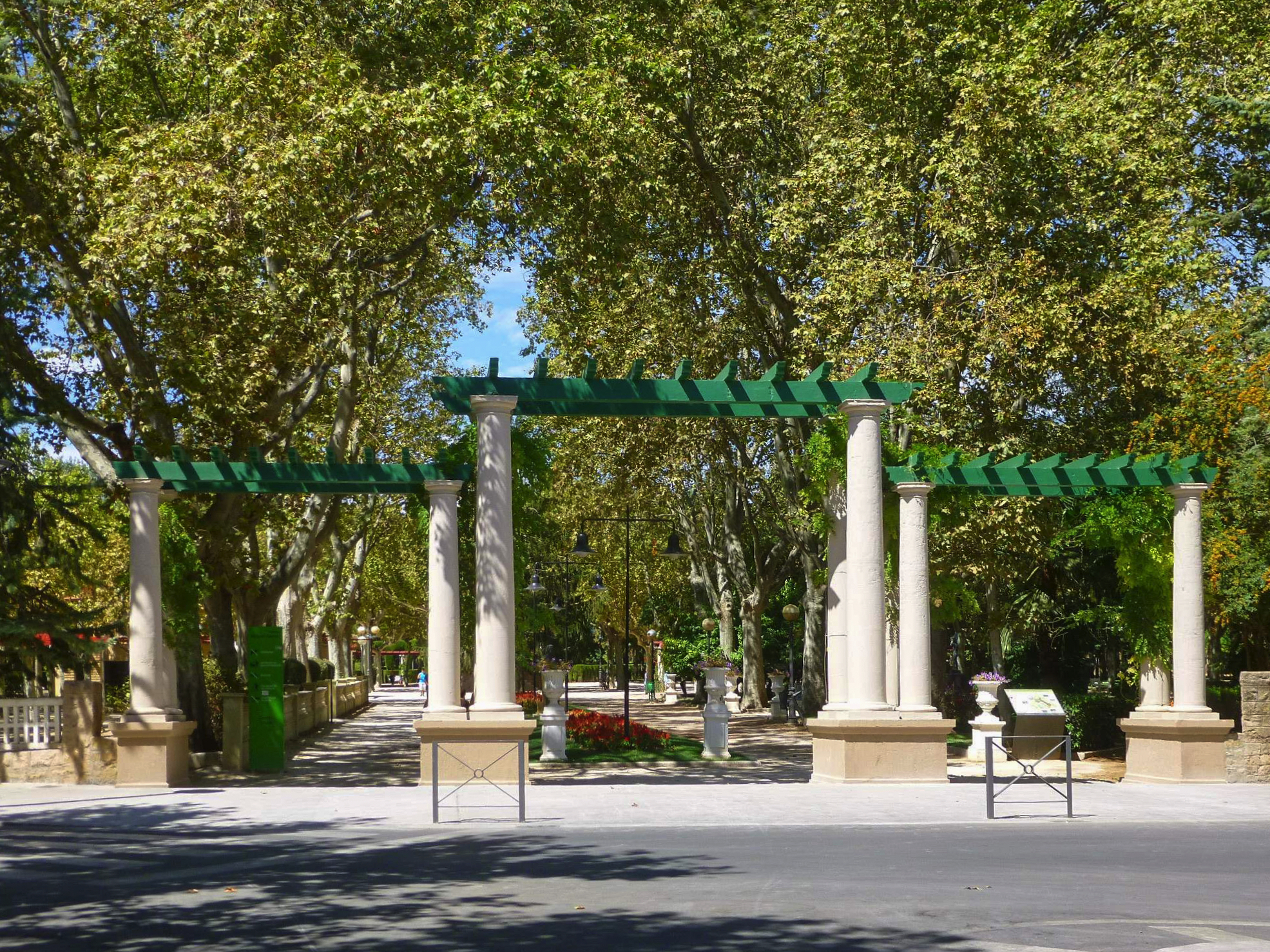
- Panoramic view from the cathedral Cathedral Miguel Servet park

- Flag Coat of arms
- Motto: Gate of the Pyrenees
- Interactive map of Huesca
- Location of Huesca within Aragon Huesca (Spain)
- Coordinates: 42°8′N 0°25′W
- Country: Spain
- Autonomous community: Aragon
- Province: Huesca
- Comarca: Hoya de Huesca
- Judicial district: Huesca
- Founded by: Iberians

Government
  - Type: Mayor-council
  - Body: Ayuntamiento de Huesca
  - Mayor: Lorena Orduna (2023) (PP)

Area
  - Total: 161.0 km^{2} (62.2 sq mi)
- Elevation: 488 m (1,601 ft)

Population (2025-01-01)
  - Total: 55,454
  - Density: 344.4/km^{2} (892.1/sq mi)
- Demonym: Oscense
- Time zone: UTC+1 (CET)
  - Summer (DST): UTC+2 (CEST)
- Postal code: 22001 - 22006
- Dialing code: 974
- Patron saints: Saint Lawrence; Saint Vincent
- Website: Official website

Huesca (Spanish: [ˈweska]; Aragonese: Uesca) is a city in north-eastern Spain, within the autonomous community of Aragon. It was the capital of the Kingdom of Aragon between 1096 and 1118. It is also the capital of the Spanish province of the same name and of the comarca of Hoya de Huesca. In 2009, it had a population of 52,059, almost a quarter of the total population of the province. The city is one of the smallest provincial capitals in Spain.

Huesca celebrates its main festival, the Fiestas de San Lorenzo, in honor of Saint Lawrence, from 9 to 15 August.

== History ==
Huesca dates from pre-Roman times, and was once known as Bolskan (Iberian: ) in the ancient Iberian language. It was once the capital of the Vescetani, in the north of Hispania Tarraconensis, on the road from Tarraco (modern Tarragona) and Ilerda (modern Lleida) to Caesaraugusta (modern Zaragoza). During Roman times, the city was known as Osca, and was a Roman colony under the rule of Quintus Sertorius, who made Osca his base. The city minted its own coinage and was the site of a prestigious school founded by Sertorius to educate young Iberians in Latin and Roman customs. After Sertorius, it is thought that it was renamed Ileoscan (Ἰλεόσκαν) by Strabo. It appears to have been situated on silver mines.

Eighteenth-century Spanish historian Enrique Flórez has pointed out the impossibility of one city supplying such vast quantities of minted silver as has been recorded by ancient writers under the terms argentum Oscense, signatum Oscense; and is of the opinion that "Oscense" meant "Spanish", being a corruption of "Eus-cara". The Romanised city was made a municipium by decree of Augustus in 30 BC.

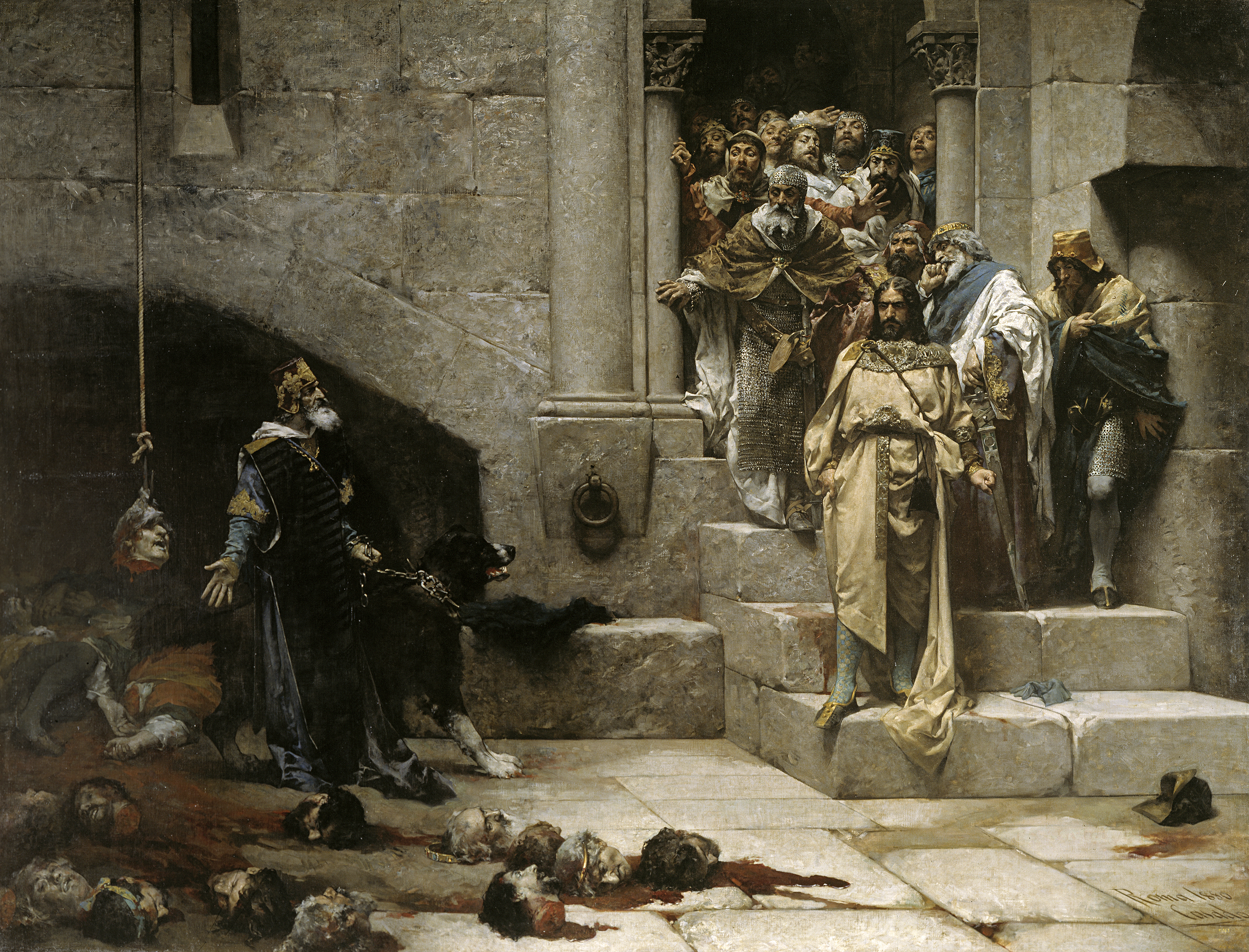
The Bell of Huesca, by José Casado del Alisal

The Arabs conquered the city in the late 8th century, and the city came to be called Washqah (وشقة in Arabic), falling within the Upper March of the Emirate of Córdoba. It was ruled by a local governor appointed from Córdoba, but was repeatedly subject to political turmoil, rebellion and assassination as the Banu Qasi, Banu Amrus and Banu al-Tawil clans, as well as the Arista dynasty of Pamplona, struggled for control, autonomy and independence from the Emirate. In the mid-10th century, Wasqah was transferred to the Banu Tujib, who governed the Upper March from Zaragoza, and it became part of the Taifa of Zaragoza in 1018 when they successfully freed themselves from the disintegrating Caliphate. In 1094 Sancho Ramirez built the nearby Castle of Montearagón with the intention of laying siege to Wasqah but was killed by a stray arrow as he reached the city's walls. It was conquered in 1096 by Peter I of Aragon and moved his royal capital to Huesca from the ancient capital of Jaca. In 1118 the Aragonese capital was moved to Zaragoza.

In 1354, King Peter IV of Aragon founded the University of Huesca, which initially had a faculty of theology. The school expanded, but by the end of the 16th century was eclipsed by the University of Zaragoza. The university was abolished in 1845.

Historically, Huesca was home to one of the most important Jewish communities in Aragon, third after Zaragoza and Calatayud. The town once had three synagogues. In 1489–90, the Inquisition prosecuted and burned several local Jews for having arranged the circumcision of two conversos some twenty-five years earlier. The Jewish community flourished until the 1492 expulsion of the Jews.

During the First Carlist War, Huesca was the site of a battle between Spanish Constitutionalists and Carlists.

During the Spanish Civil War (1936–39) the "Huesca Front" was the scene of some of the worst fighting between the Republicans and Franco's army. Held by the Nationalists, the city was besieged by the Republicans, with George Orwell among them, but did not fall.

== Modern Huesca ==
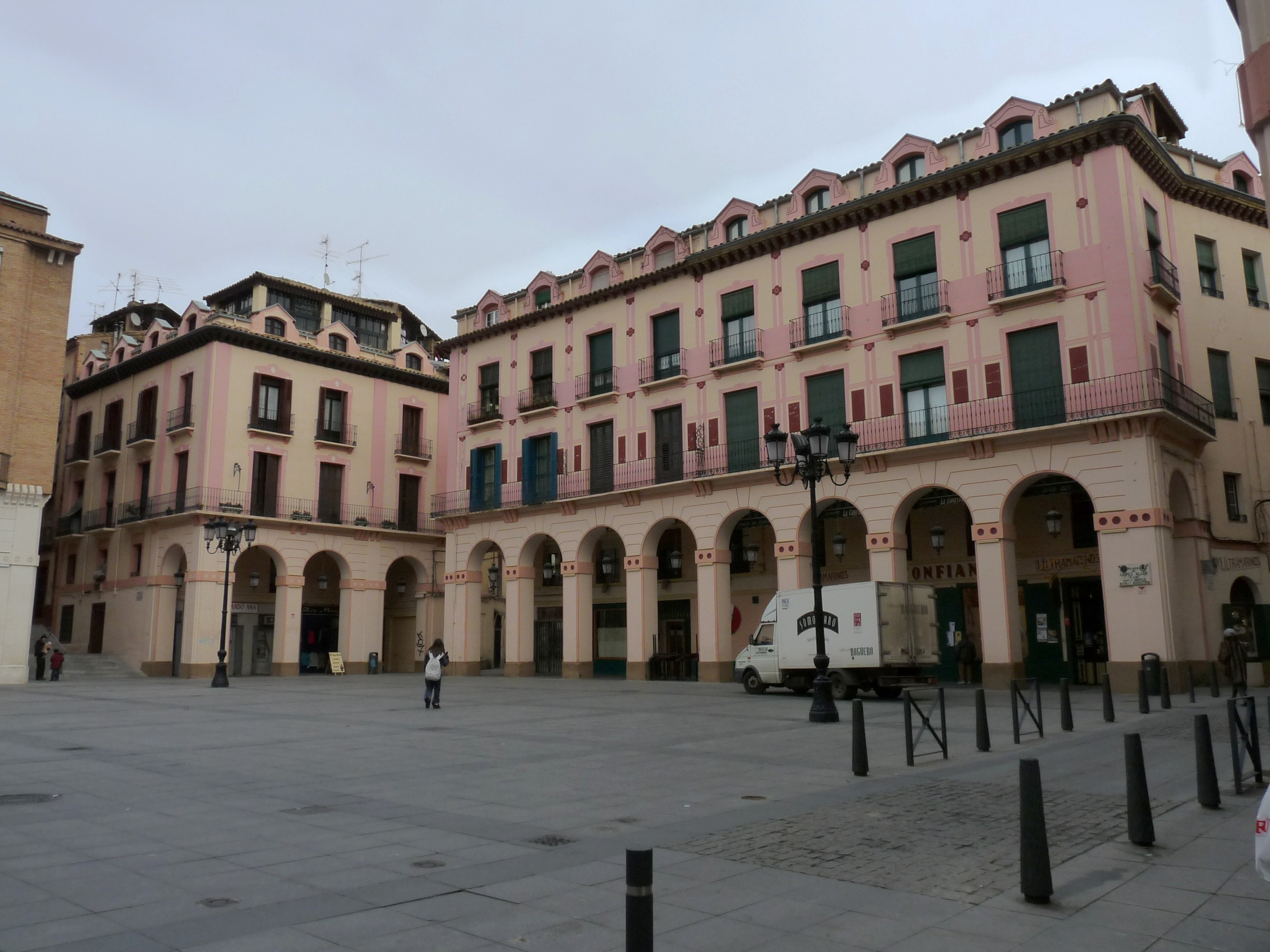
Allué square

Various streets in the centre of Huesca have recently been pedestrianised.

== Geography ==
Huesca lies on a plateau in the northern region of Aragón, with an elevation of 488 m (1,601 ft) above sea level. Close to the city lie the Sierra de Guara mountains, which reach 2,077 m. The geographical coordinates of the city are: 42° 08´ N, 0° 24´ W.

Its municipal area is 161.02 km^{2} and borders the municipalities of Almudévar, Vicién, Monflorite-Lascasas Tierz, Quicena, Loporzano, Nueno, Igriés, Banastás, Chimillas, Alerre, Barbués and Albero Bajo.

The city lies 71 kilometres (44 miles) from Zaragoza, 160 kilometres (99 miles) from Pamplona, 118 kilometres (73 miles) from Lleida, 380 kilometres (240 miles) from Madrid and 273 kilometres (170 miles) from Barcelona.

== Coat of arms ==
Both the modern Coat of Arms of Huesca (es) (which date from the 16th century) and its mediaeval predecessor (from the 13th) include at their top the device of a block having a V-shaped notch. It is commonly said that it symbolises Salto de Roldán ('Roland's Leap'), a natural rock formation about 25 km (16 mi) north of the city. (Note: The idea is not impossible. Fox-Davies' Complete Guide to Heraldry (1909) includes no example of any heraldic charge like it.) Some writers have suggested that the official Spanish name of Huesca (Catalan: Osca) derives from a Latin, Basque and Catalan word osca, meaning notch or indentation, referring to the Salto de Roldán.

== Climate ==
Huesca has a humid subtropical climate (Köppen Cfa). with semi-arid influences. Winters are cool (with normal maximums from 8 to 16 °C and minimums from -2 to 6 °C) and summers are hot, with daily maximums reaching up to 35 °C (95 °F), while the rainiest seasons are autumn and spring. The average precipitation is 480 mm per year. Frost is common and there is sporadic snowfall, with an average of three snowy days per year.

Climate data for Huesca Airport, 541 m a.s.l. (1981–2010)
Month	Jan	Feb	Mar	Apr	May	Jun	Jul	Aug	Sep	Oct	Nov	Dec	Year
Record high °C (°F)	20.3 (68.5)	21.0 (69.8)	26.2 (79.2)	31.0 (87.8)	34.2 (93.6)	41.2 (106.2)	42.6 (108.7)	41.4 (106.5)	39.2 (102.6)	30.6 (87.1)	24.8 (76.6)	19.6 (67.3)	42.6 (108.7)
Mean daily maximum °C (°F)	9.0 (48.2)	11.6 (52.9)	15.7 (60.3)	18.0 (64.4)	22.3 (72.1)	28.1 (82.6)	31.6 (88.9)	30.9 (87.6)	25.9 (78.6)	19.8 (67.6)	13.4 (56.1)	9.2 (48.6)	19.6 (67.3)
Daily mean °C (°F)	5.2 (41.4)	6.9 (44.4)	10.1 (50.2)	12.1 (53.8)	16.1 (61.0)	21.0 (69.8)	24.1 (75.4)	23.7 (74.7)	19.8 (67.6)	15.0 (59.0)	9.3 (48.7)	5.5 (41.9)	14.0 (57.2)
Mean daily minimum °C (°F)	1.4 (34.5)	2.2 (36.0)	4.5 (40.1)	6.2 (43.2)	9.8 (49.6)	13.8 (56.8)	16.5 (61.7)	16.6 (61.9)	13.6 (56.5)	10.1 (50.2)	5.2 (41.4)	1.9 (35.4)	8.4 (47.1)
Record low °C (°F)	−12.6 (9.3)	−13.2 (8.2)	−8.6 (16.5)	−3.0 (26.6)	−1.5 (29.3)	3.6 (38.5)	4.5 (40.1)	7.0 (44.6)	4.2 (39.6)	−0.4 (31.3)	−8.2 (17.2)	−10.8 (12.6)	−13.2 (8.2)
Average precipitation mm (inches)	31 (1.2)	28 (1.1)	30 (1.2)	53 (2.1)	52 (2.0)	33 (1.3)	22 (0.9)	29 (1.1)	48 (1.9)	60 (2.4)	47 (1.9)	44 (1.7)	480 (18.9)
Average precipitation days (≥ 1 mm)	5	5	4	6	7	4	3	3	4	7	6	6	61
Average snowy days	1	1	0	0	0	0	0	0	0	0	0	1	3
Average relative humidity (%)	78	70	61	60	57	50	47	50	57	67	76	81	63
Mean monthly sunshine hours	138	173	230	243	275	302	346	314	247	197	146	123	2,732
Source: AEMET

== Main sights ==
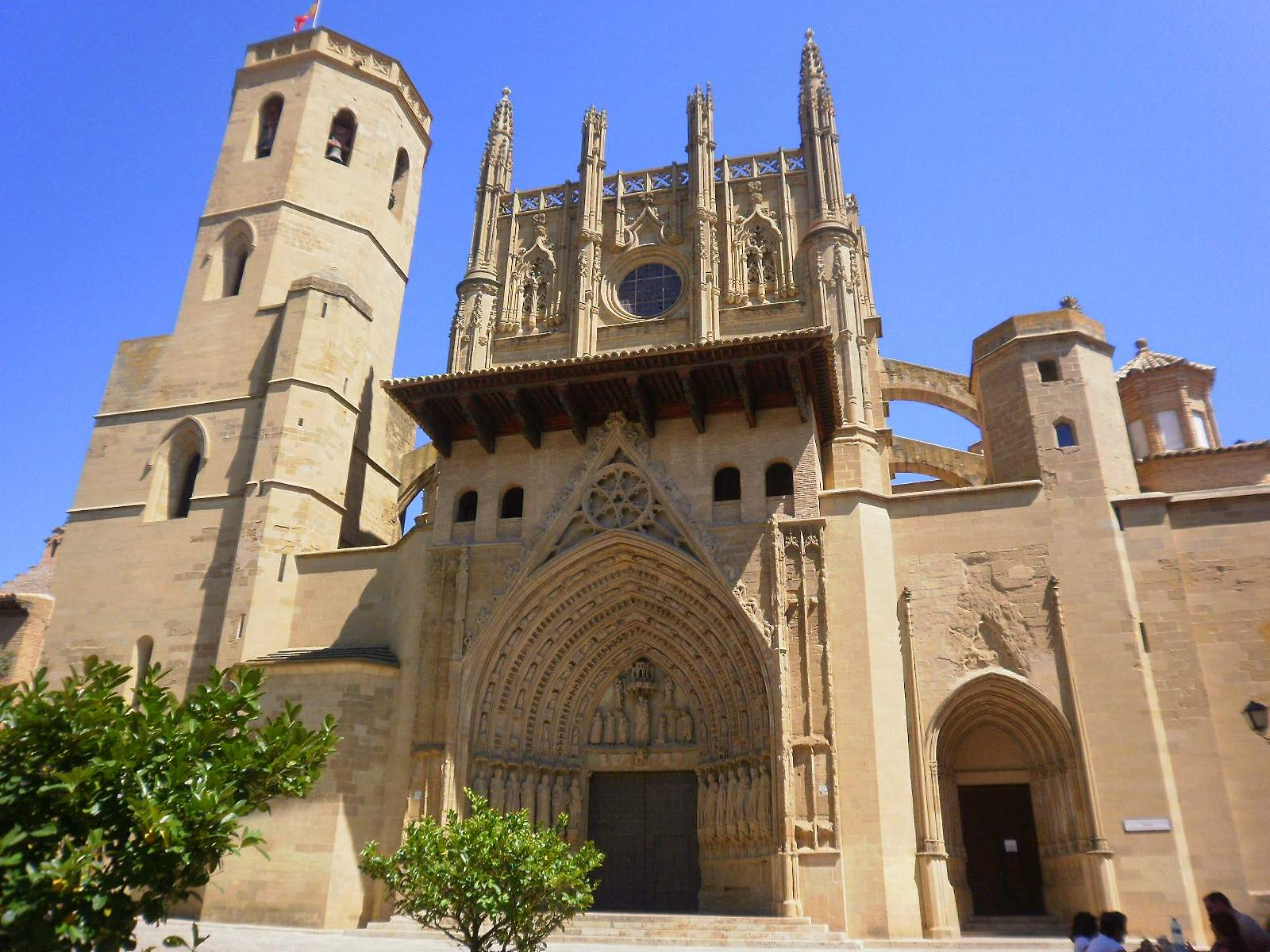
Cathedral of Huesca

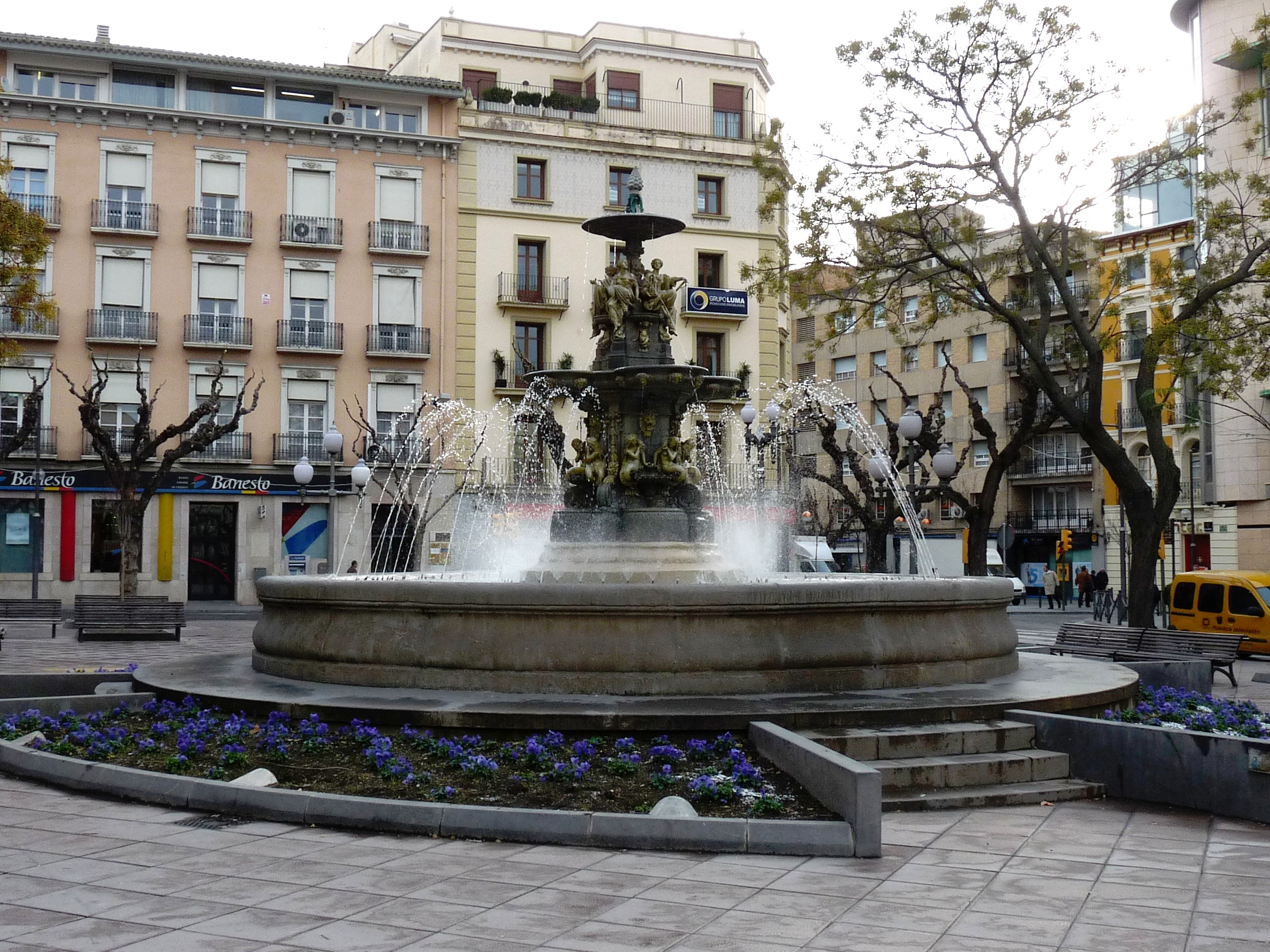
Fuente de las Musas

A double line of ancient walls can still be seen in present-day Huesca.

Nearby, in the territory of Quicena, lie the ruins of the Castle of Montearagón Monastery.

=== Churches of Huesca ===
- Huesca Cathedral (Catedral de la Transfiguración del Señor), a Gothic-style cathedral built by king James I of Aragon around 1273 on the ruined foundations of a mosque. Work continued until the fifteenth century, and the cathedral is now one of the architectural gems of northern Spain. The doorway, built between 1300 and 1313, has carvings depicting the Apostles. The interior contains a triple nave and chapels. It includes a magnificent high altar made from alabaster, carved to represent the crucifixion, built between 1520 and 1533 by Damián Forment. The cloister and the bell-tower were built in the fifteenth century.
- Abbey of San Pedro el Viejo, erected between 1100 and 1241, is one of the oldest Romanesque structures in the Iberian Peninsula. It was partially rebuilt in the seventeenth century, and retains its cloister built in 1140.
- Church of St. Lawrence (Iglesia de San Lorenzo), built in the seventeenth and eighteenth centuries.

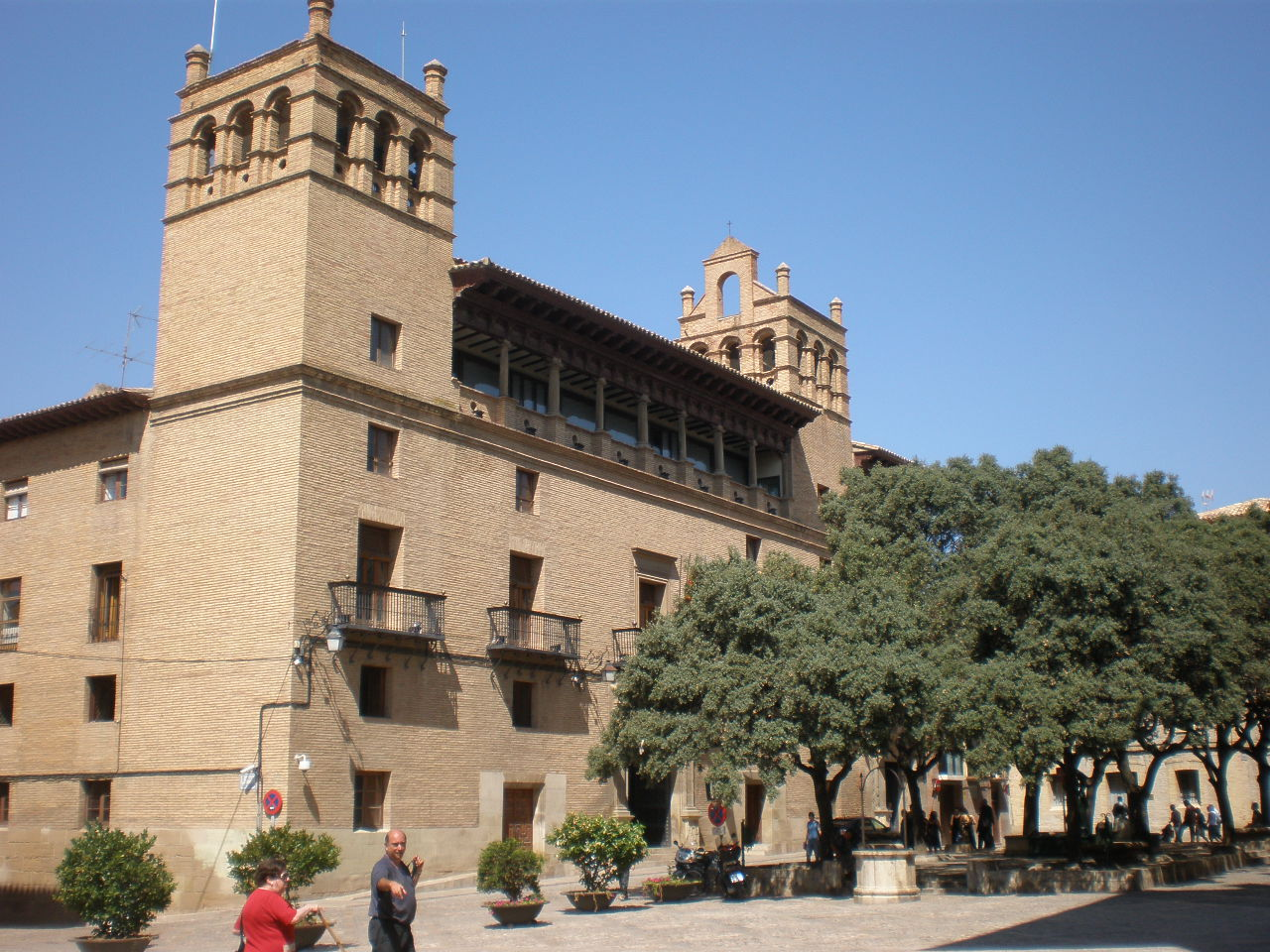
Huesca City Hall

- Iglesia de Santo Domingo, a Baroque style church.
- Iglesia de la Compañía San Vicente, from the 17th century
- Ermita de Ntr. Sra. de Salas, a Romanesque and Baroque hermitage.
- Ermita de Loreto, San Lorenzo's oldest hermitage, according to tradition.
- Ermita de San Jorge, built in memory of the Battle of Alcoraz
- Ermita de las Mártires
- Ermita de Santa Lucía
- Ermita de Jara, in ruins
- San Miguel, a Romanesque tower
- Santa María de Foris, built in a transitional Romanesque style
- Santa Cruz, Seminary, on Romanesque foundations.
- There are several old monasteries in the local area. One in the Castle of Montearagón contains the tomb of king Alfonso I of Aragon in its crypt.
- The Museum of Huesca occupies the building formerly belonging to the old university. The famous "Bell of Huesca" lies in one of its vaults, and is said to have been constructed from the heads of rebels who were executed by King Ramiro II of Aragon.

== Culture ==
Huesca celebrates its most important annual festival in August: the festival (or fiesta) of San Lorenzo (Saint Lawrence), a native of Huesca martyred in 268 AD. The anniversary of his martyrdom falls on August 10. The fiesta starts on 9 August and finishes on the 15. Many of the inhabitants dress in green and white for the duration. San Lorenzo, born in Huesca, was a deacon in Rome and a martyr who, according to legend, was burned on a grille by the Romans. The grille is the symbol of San Lorenzo and can be seen in a number of decorative works in the city.

Every summer since 1973 the city has hosted the Huesca International Film Festival, an international gathering dedicated to short meter films. It is one of the six Spanish festivals qualifying for the Goya and the Academy Awards.

== Notable people ==
Huesca is the birthplace of film director Carlos Saura and his brother Antonio Saura, a contemporary artist.

The writer Oscar Sipan, winner of several literary prizes, was born in Huesca in 1974. The celebrated illustrator Isidro Ferrer, though born in Madrid, lives in the city.

- Amrus ibn Yusuf (Huesca, 760- 808/9 or 813/4 Talavera de la Reina or Zaragoza), general of the Emirate of Córdoba and governor of Zaragoza
- Petrus Alphonsi (Born at an unknown date in the 11th century in Huesca, died 1140?), was a Jewish Spanish physician, writer, astronomer, and polemicist, who converted to Christianity.
- Petronilla of Aragon (Huesca, 1136 – 15 October 1173), Queen of Aragon from the abdication of her father in 1137 until her own abdication in 1164.
- Alfonso II of Aragon (Huesca, March 1157 – 25 April 1196), was the King of Aragon and Count of Barcelona from 1164 until his death.
- Peter II of Aragon (Huesca, July 1178 – 12 September 1213), was the King of Aragon (as Pedro II) and Count of Barcelona (as Pere I) from 1196 to 1213.
- Vincencio Juan de Lastanosa (Huesca, 1607 - 1681), collector, scholar, Spanish cultural promoter and patron.
- Valentín Carderera (Huesca, 1796 - Madrid, 1880), promoter of the arts, writer and academic art painter.
- Lucas Mallada y Pueyo (Huesca, 1841 - Madrid 1921), mining engineer, paleontologist and writer, belonging to Regenerationism movement.
- Fidel Pagés (Huesca, January 26, 1886 - September 21, 1923 Madrid), Spanish military surgeon, known for developing the technique of epidural anesthesia.
- Ramón Acín Aquilué (1888, Huesca, Aragon, Spain – 1936), anarcho-syndicalist, teacher, writer and avant-garde artist murdered by fascists in the first year of the Spanish Civil War.
- Pepín Bello (13 May 1904, Huesca – 11 January 2008), intellectual and writer. He was regarded as the last survivor of the "Generation of '27".
- Julio Alejandro (Huesca, 1906 – 1995 Javea), was a Spanish screenwriter. He wrote for 80 films between 1951 and 1984.
- Antonio Saura (September 22, 1930, Huesca – July 22, 1998, Cuenca) was a Spanish artist and writer, one of the major post-war painters to emerge in Spain in the fifties.
- Carlos Saura (4 January 1932, Huesca – 10 February 2023, Collado Mediano) is a Spanish film director and photographer.
- Josep Acebillo (born in Huesca, Spain, in 1946), architect.
- Esteban Navarro (Moratalla, 1965), writer. Huesca resident since 2001.
- Nunilo and Alodia (Huesca, A.D. 851), martyrs of Christianity. Died after refusing to deny Christ.
- Sara Giménez Giménez (born in Huesca, 1977), Roma lawyer

== Popular references ==
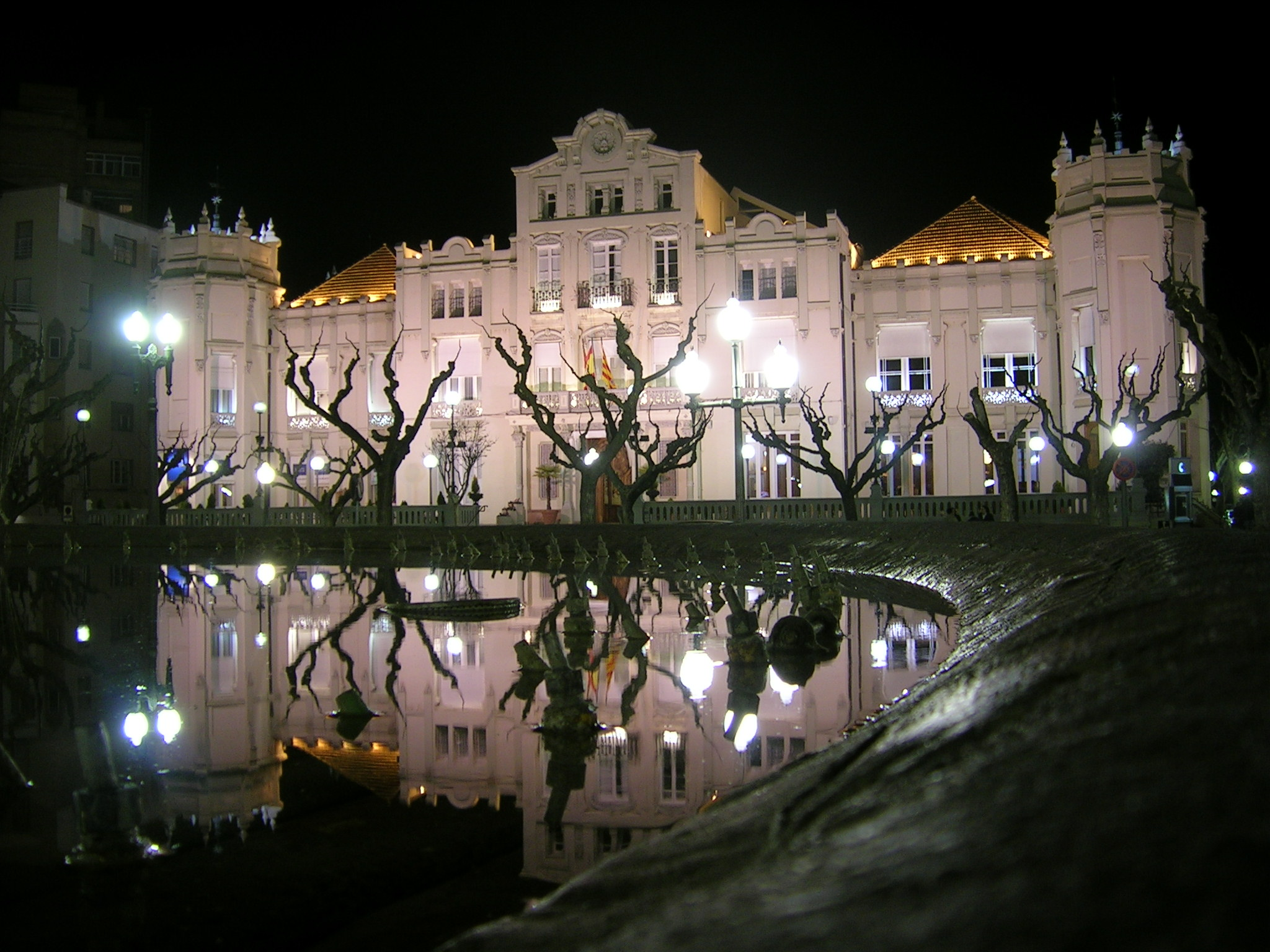
The Casino (Oscense Circle)

Huesca is notable for the saying "Tomorrow we'll have coffee in Huesca", a running joke among militiamen of the Spanish Civil War. In February 1937, George Orwell was stationed near the falangist-held Huesca as a member of the POUM militia. In Homage to Catalonia, Orwell writes about this running joke, originally a naïvely optimistic comment made by one of the Spanish Republican generals:

Months earlier, when Siétamo was taken, the general commanding the Government troops had said gaily: "Tomorrow we'll have coffee in Huesca." It turned out that he was mistaken. There had been bloody attacks, but the town did not fall, and [the phrase] had become a standing joke throughout the army. If I ever go back to Spain I shall make a point of having a cup of coffee in Huesca.

Huesca is also famous for the legend of the Bell of Huesca.

== Twin towns and sister cities ==
The following are Sister cities of Huesca:

- Tarbes, France (since 1964)

== Transportation ==
The Autovía A-23 runs near Huesca, connecting the city with Zaragoza in the south and with Jaca in the north, although the section to Jaca is not yet completed as of 2026. The Autovía A-22 connects Huesca to Lleida in the east. The two highways will eventually connect.

Huesca has been served by Huesca–Pirineos Airport since 1930, but the airport does not currently have any scheduled commercial passenger services. The nearest airports are Zaragoza Airport, located 83 km (52 mi) south west and Lleida-Alguaire Airport, located 119 km (74 mi) to the south east of Huesca.

Huesca railway station is served by regional and AVE trains to destinations including Zaragoza, Canfranc, Madrid and Jaca.

== Sports ==
In 2018, SD Huesca, became the town's first football team to be promoted to La Liga. They became the 63rd team to play in the league, and their stadium's maximum capacity was the smallest in the 2018–19 La Liga.

== See also ==
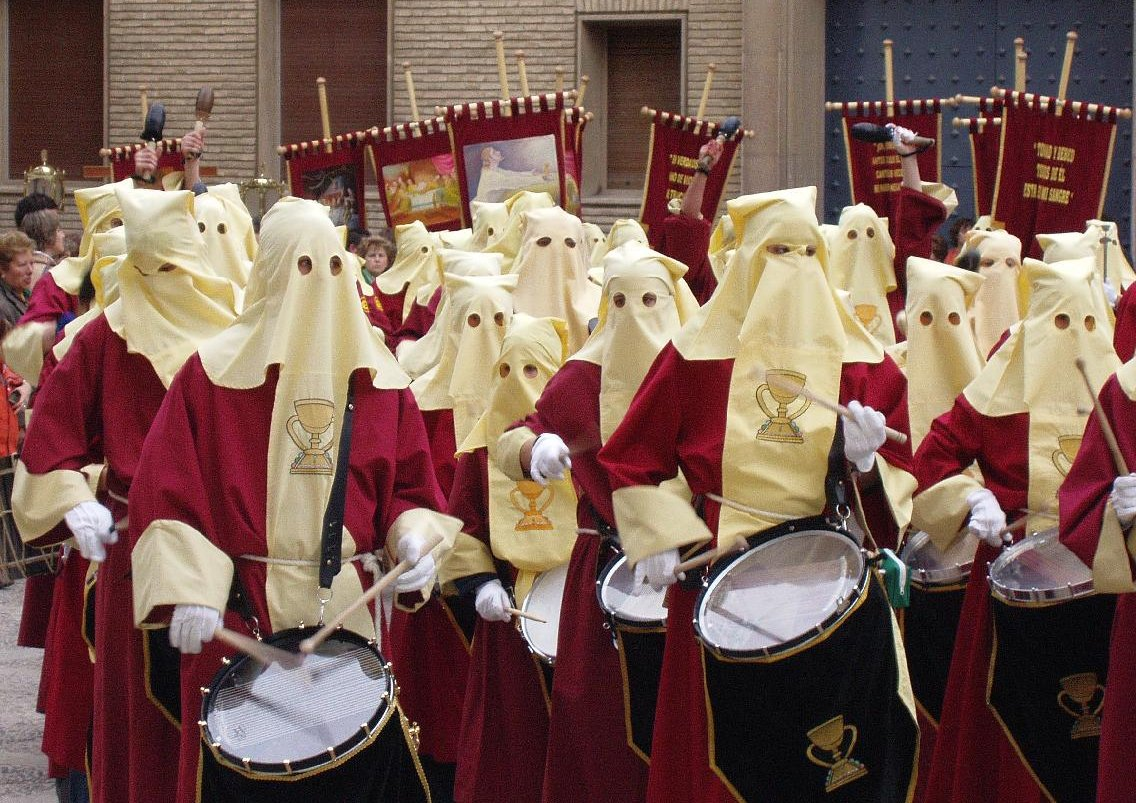
Holy week, Huesca

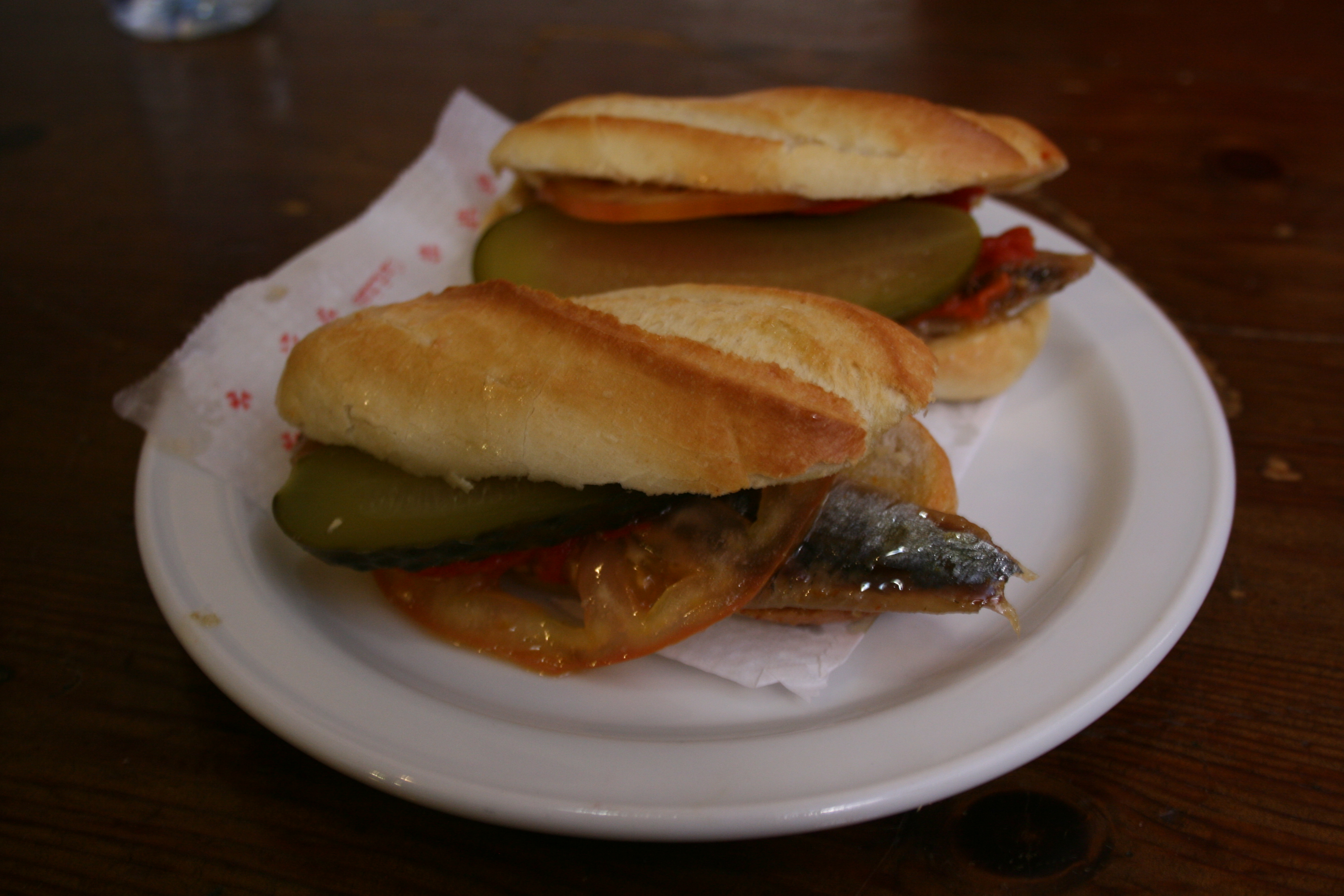
Tapa El Lince from Huesca

- Diocese of Huesca
- List of municipalities in Huesca
