= Al-Udhri =

Andalusian historian (1003-1085)

al-Udhri
- العذري
- Born: Abū al-ʿAbbās Aḥmad ibn ʿUmar ibn Anas al-ʿUdrī; 1003 CE; Almería, Al-Andalus (modern-day Spain)
- Died: 1085 CE; Zaragoza, Al-Andalus (modern-day Spain)
- Occupations: Geographer, Historian, Traveler

Academic background
- Influences: Abu Dhar al-Harawi, Abu Umar Ibn 'Abd al-Barr, Ibn Hazm

Academic work
- Era: Taifa period
- Notable works: Tarsi al-akhbar, Nizam al-murdjan

Abu ʾl-ʿAbbās Aḥmad ibn ʿUmar ibn Anas al-ʿUdhrī (1003–1085), called Ibn al-Dalāʾī, was an Arab geographer, traveler and historian of al-Andalus. He hailed from the Arab tribe of Udhra which had settled Almería.

== Life ==
Al-Udhri's family settled in Dalías shortly after the Arab conquest of Spain. Born in Almería in 1003, he journeyed to Mecca as a young boy. During his ten-year stay, he studied with Abu Dhar al-Harawi. Upon his return to al-Andalus he was apprenticed to Abu Umar Ibn 'Abd al-Barr and later Ibn Hazm. He lived in Zaragoza and was the author of a geographical-historical compendium about the Taifa of Zaragoza in al-Andalus, in which he gives the annals of the region. He is also the author of the family histories of the Banu Qasi, Banu Sabrit, and Banu Tujib, which are now lost, but were cited by al-Maqqari. He is best known for the Tarsi al-akhbar (Nizam al-murdjan), a history of the civil wars and rebellions on the Upper March and the civil war in the Taifa of Almería.

== Works ==
- "Tarsi al-akhbar wa-tanwi al-athar wa-al-bustan" (Madrid: Instituto de Estudios Islámicos en Madrid, 1965) relevant parts of which have been abstracted and translated by:
  - E. Molina López, "La cora de Tudmir según al-Udri", Cuadernos de Historia del Islam, 4 (1972), 7-113
  - Fernando de La Granja, A marca superior en la obra de Al-ʿUdri, Estudios de la Edad Media de la Corona de Aragón, 8 (Saragossa 1967), 457-461
  - Jesús Lorenzo Jiménez, La Dawla de los Banu Qasi (2010, on source CD)
- Biography of the qadi Muhammad ibn Furtis
- "Books of the characteristics of prophecy", about theology and law, now lost
- "The thread of pearls around the paths and the kingdoms", as Yaqut calls it, about geography

Other translations which include al-Udri's include:

- M. Sánchez Marínez, 'Rāzī, fuente de al-ʿUdrī para la España pre-islamica', Cuadernos de Historia del Islam, 3 (1971), 7-49
- E. de Santiago, 'Al-Rāzī, fuente de al-ʿUd̲rī. Dos precisiones historiográficas', Miscelánea de Estudios Árabes y Hebraicos, 20.1 (1971), 103-8
- Sánchez Martínez, 'La cora de Ilbīra (Granada y Almería) en los siglos X y XI', Cuadernos de Historia del Islam, 7 (1975-76), 5-82
- W. Hoenerbach, 'Observaciones al estudio La cora de Ilbīra', Cuadernos de Historia del Islam, 8 (1977), 125-38
- E. Gálvez, 'Chorographia hispalense', Historia, Instituciones, Documents, 9 (1982), 113-34
- R. Valencia, 'La cora de Sevilla en el Tarṣīʿ al-ajbār de Aḥmad b. ʿUmar al-ʿUdrī', Andalucía islámica. Textos y estudios, 4-5 (1983-6), 107-43.

== See also ==
- List of Muslim historians

== Bibliography ==
- Al-Udri: El palacio de Almotacín en Almería, Islam y Al-Ándalus.
- "Al-Udri" Gran Enciclopedia Aragonesa (GER) en línea.
- Luis de Molina. “Las dos versiones de la geografía de Al-Udri”, Al-Qantara, vol. 3, 1982, pp.& 249–260
- José Ángel Tapia Garrido, Almería hombre a hombre, Almería: Ed. Monte de Piedad y Caja de Ahorros de Almería, 1979, ISBN 84-500-3468-X, pp.& 25–26
