= Galindo Garcés =

Galindo Garcés (fl. 833?) was the son of García Galíndez "the Bad" who may have ruled the county of Aragon for a time after his father's death.

Galindo was born no earlier than 817, since his father married a daughter of King Íñigo Arista of Pamplona shortly after he had usurped the county of Aragon from Aznar Galíndez I. There is only a single document which confirms that Galindo succeeded his father as count no later than 833. He probably began his rule under a regency on account of his age. The document dates from the period 828–833. In it, Galindo, calling himself count, and his wife Guldreguth make a joint donation of land to the monastery of San Pedro de Siresa. In a later copy of the document, the dating clause was filled in with the date of 26 October (7 kalends November) in year 871 of the Spanish era, corresponding to AD 833, during the reign of Emperor Louis the Pious.

The Genealogies of Roda indicate that Aznar's son, Galindo Aznárez I, recovered his father's county at some point. There are many documents in which it is impossible to determine if the count Galindo in question was Galindo Garcés or Galindo Aznárez. Galindo Garcés is probably to be identified with the count who fixed the boundaries of the monastery of San Martín de Cillas in 828 in cooperation with King García Jiménez of Pamplona.

Preceded by García Galíndez	Count of Aragon; 833?	Succeeded by Galindo Aznárez I
