= Galindez =

Galindez can refer to:

- Galíndez, novel by Manuel Vázquez Montalbán
- Galindez Island, in the Argentine Islands off Antarctica

== Names ==
- García Galíndez (d. 833), Count of Aragon
- Aznar Galíndez I (d. 839), Count of Aragon
- Aznar Galíndez II (d. 893), Count of Aragon
- Andregoto Galíndez (fl 930s), Queen Consort of Pamplona
- Jesús Galíndez, (1915-1956), writer and lecturer on international law
- Víctor Galíndez (1948-1980), Argentine boxer
- Dina Galindez Argentine paralympic athlete
