= Asya (given name) =

- Gender: female

Origin
- Meaning: Arabic melancholic, Russian diminutive of Anastasia, meaning resurrection, Turkish Asia.

Asya is a given name with varied origins. It is a Turkish feminine given name meaning Asia. It is a Bulgarian and Russian diminutive form of the feminine given name Anastasia, meaning resurrection. It is also a form of the Arabic name Asiya, meaning 'melancholic' or 'wistful'.

== People ==
- Asya of Diauehi, a ruler of the Kingdom of Diaokhi, a confederation of proto-Georgian tribes, who reigned around the middle of the 9th century BCE.
- Asya (singer) (born 1965), Turkish singer
- Asya, ring name of American bodybuilder, model and professional wrestler Christi Wolf
- Asya Abdullah (born 1971), Kurdish politician, co-chairwoman of the Democratic Union Party (PYD)
- Asya Alashaikh, founder and CEO of Tamkeen Company for sustainable solutions in the Kingdom of Saudi Arabia.
- Asya Ramazan Antar (1998–2016), Kurdish Women's Protection Units (YPJ) fighter who has become a symbol of the feminist struggle in the Rojava conflict and in the fight against ISIS, by international media.
- Asya Branch (born 1998), American beauty pageant titleholder and Miss USA 2020 winner
- Asya Bussie (born 1991), American basketball player
- Adi Asya Katz (born 2004), Israeli rhythmic gymnast
- Asya Kolchynska (1918–2010), Ukrainian pathophysiologist, medical doctor, professor, and Laureate of the State Prize of Ukraine in Science and Technology
- Asya Miller (born 1979), American goalball player
- Asya Pereltsvaig (born 1972), Russian linguist
- Asya Rolls, Israeli, psychoneuroimmunologist and International Howard Hughes Medical Institute Investigator and an associate professor at the Immunology and Center of Neuroscience at Technion within the Israel Institute of Technology
- Asya Saavedra, founding member of the music group Smoosh renamed Chaos Chaos
- Asya Şenyüz (born 2004), German politician
- Asya Sultanova (1923–2021), Azerbaijani composer
- Asya Tavano (born 2002), Italian judoka
- Asia Tawfiq Wahbi (1901–1980), Iraqi write and social reformer
- Asya Yeutykh (born 1962), goldsmith and bladesmith from the Republic of Adygea in Russia

== See also ==
- Aiza
