= Battle of Pancorbo =

Battle of Pancorbo may refer to the following armed conflicts:

- Battle of Pancorbo (816) between the Emirate of Cordoba and forces loyal to Francia,
- Battle of Zornoza (1809), one of the opening engagements in French invasion of Spain.
