= Kingdom of Navarre =

Medieval kingdom around the Pyrenees

Kingdom of Navarre Nafarroako Erresuma (Basque) Reino de Navarra (Spanish) Royaume de Navarre (French) Reiaume de Navarra (Occitan) Regnum Navarrae (Latin)
- 824 (traditional)–1841
- Royal flag Coat of arms (1234–1580)

- The Kingdom of Navarre in Europe, 1190
- Capital: Pamplona (Basque: Iruña); 42°49′01″N 1°38′34″W
- Common languages: Basque (spoken and written); Latin (written); Navarro-Aragonese (administrative; spoken); Gascon (spoken and written); Castilian (Upper Navarre); French (Lower Navarre); Hebrew (written in Aljamiado); Andalusian Arabic (written or formal)
- Religion: Majority religion: Catholicism (official); Minority religions: Basque paganism (practiced in the initial years); Sephardic Judaism (until 1515); Islam (until 1515); Calvinism (of the royal court, 1560–1594)
- Government: Feudal monarchy
- Monarch
  - 824–851/2: Íñigo Arista (first)
  - 1610–1620: Louis II (last. French kingdom)
  - 1830–1841: Isabella II of Spain (last. Spanish kingdom)
- Historical era: Middle Ages
  - Established: 824
  - Disestablished: 1841

Area
- 1300: 10,000 km^{2} (3,900 sq mi)

Population
  - 1300: ~100,000
Preceded by
Duchy of Gascony
Kingdom of France
Upper March
Emirate of Córdoba
Succeeded by
Kingdom of France
Crown of Castile
Crown of Aragon
Kingdom of Spain
- Today part of: Spain; France

The Kingdom of Navarre (/nəˈvɑːr/ nə-VAR), originally the Kingdom of Pamplona, was a historical Iberian polity which occupied lands on both sides of the western Pyrenees, with its northernmost areas originally reaching the Atlantic Ocean (Bay of Biscay), between present-day Spain and France.

The medieval state took form around the city of Pamplona during the first centuries of the Iberian Reconquista. The kingdom had its origins in the conflict in the buffer region between the Carolingian Empire and the Umayyad Emirate of Córdoba that controlled most of the Iberian Peninsula. The city of Pamplona (Latin: Pompaelo; Basque: Iruña), had been the main city of the indigenous Vasconic population and was located in a predominantly Basque-speaking area.

In an event traditionally dated to 824, Íñigo Arista was elected or declared ruler of the area around Pamplona in opposition to Frankish expansion into the region, originally as vassal to the Córdoba emirate. This polity evolved into the Kingdom of Pamplona. A series of partitions and dynastic changes led to a diminution of its territory and to periods of rule by the kings of Aragon (1054–1134) and France (1285–1328).

In the 15th century, another dynastic dispute over control by the king of Aragon led to internal divisions and the eventual conquest of the southern part of the kingdom by Ferdinand II of Aragon in 1512 (permanently annexed in 1524). It was annexed by the Courts of Castile to the Crown of Castile in 1515 as a separate kingdom with its own Courts and judiciary until 1841.

The remaining northern part of the kingdom was once again joined with France by personal union in 1589 when King Henry III of Navarre inherited the French throne as Henry IV of France, and in 1620 it was merged into the Kingdom of France. The monarchs of this unified state took the title "King of France and Navarre" until its fall in the French Revolution, and again during the Bourbon Restoration from 1814 until 1830 (with a brief interregnum in 1815).

The ancient Kingdom of Navarre covered, at its greatest extent, approximately the modern-day Spanish autonomous communities of Navarre, Basque Country and La Rioja and the French territory of Lower Navarre in Pyrénées-Atlantiques.

== Etymology ==
Similar earlier toponyms exist but the first documentation of Latin navarros appears in Eginhard's chronicle of the feats of Charles the Great. Other Royal Frankish Annals give nabarros. Several Frankish sources mention the nabarri/navarri and the Hispani wascones, and also pampilonensi.

Two etymologies have been proposed for the name of Navarra/Nafarroa/Naparroa:

- Basque nabar (declined absolutive singular nabarra): "brownish", "multicolor", which would be a contrast with the green mountain lands north of the original County of Navarre.
- Basque naba, Castilian nava ("valley", "plain", present across Spain) + Basque herri ("people", "land").

The linguist Joan Coromines considers naba as not clearly Basque in origin but as part of a wider pre-Roman substrate.

== Early historic background ==
Tribes of the western Pyrenees

The kingdom originated in the southern side of the western Pyrenees, in the flatlands around the city of Pamplona. According to Roman geographers such as Pliny the Elder and Livy, these regions were inhabited by the Vascones and other related Vasconic-Aquitanian tribes, a pre-Indo-European group of peoples who inhabited the southern slopes of the western Pyrenees and part of the shore of the Bay of Biscay. These tribes spoke an archaic version of the Basque language, usually known by linguistics as Proto-Basque, as well as some other related languages, such as the Aquitanian language. The Romans took full control of the area by 74 BC, but unlike their northern neighbors, the Aquitanians, and other tribes from the Iberian Peninsula, the Vascones negotiated their status within the Roman Empire. The region first was part of the Roman province of Hispania Citerior, then of the Hispania Tarraconensis. It would be under the jurisdiction of the conventus iuridicus of Caesaraugusta (modern Zaragoza).

The Roman Empire influenced the area in urbanization, language, infrastructure, commerce, and industry. During the Sertorian War, Pompey would command the foundation of a city in Vasconic territory, giving origin to Pompaelo, modern-day Pamplona, founded on a previously existent Vasconic town. Romanization of the Vascones led to their eventual adoption of forms of Latin that would evolve into the Navarro-Aragonese language, though the Basque language would remain widely spoken, especially in rural and mountainous areas.

After the decline of the Western Roman Empire, the Vascones were slow to be incorporated into the Visigothic Kingdom, which was in a civil war that provided the opportunity for the Umayyad conquest of Hispania. The Basque leadership most likely joined the Umayyad caliphate in the hope of stability brought by the Muslim conquerors. By 718, Pamplona had formed a pact that allowed a wide degree of autonomy in exchange for military and political subjugation, along with the payment of tribute to Córdoba. Burial ornamentation shows strong contacts with the Merovingian France and the Gascons of Aquitaine, but also items with Islamic inscriptions, while a Muslim cemetery in Pamplona, the use of which spanned several generations, suggests the presence of a Muslim garrison in the decades following the Arab invasion.

The origin and foundation of the Kingdom of Pamplona is intrinsically related to the southern expansion of the Frankish kingdom under the Merovingians and their successors, the Carolingians. About 601, the Duchy of Vasconia (Latin: Wasconiae) was established by the Merovingians, based around Roman Novempopulania and extending from the southern branch of the River Garonne to the northern side of the Pyrenees. The first documented Duke of Vasconia was Genial, who would hold that position until 627.

The Duchy of Vasconia then became a frontier territory with varying levels of autonomy granted by the Merovingian monarchs. The suppression of the Duchy of Vasconia as well as the Duchy of Aquitaine by the Carolingians would lead to a rebellion, led by Lupo II of Gascony. Pepin the Short launched a punitive War in Aquitaine (760–768) that put down the uprising and resulted in the division of the duchy into several counties, ruled from Toulouse. Similarly, across the eastern Pyrenees the Marca Hispánica was established next to the Marca Gothica, a Frankish attempt at creating buffer states between the Carolingian Empire and the Emirate of Córdoba.

The Franks under Charlemagne extended their influence and control southward, occupying several regions of the north and east of the Iberian Peninsula. It is unclear how solidly the Franks exercised control over Pamplona. In 778, Charlemagne was invited by rebellious Muslim lords on the Upper March of Al-Andalus to lead an expedition south with the intention of taking the city of Zaragoza from the Emirate of Córdoba. However, the expedition was a failure, and the Frankish army was forced to withdraw. During their retreat, they destroyed the city walls of Pamplona to weaken the city and avoid a possible rebellion, reminiscent of the approach the Carolingians had used elsewhere against Christian cities that seemed content to live under Córdoban control.

However, while moving through the Pyrenees on 15 August 778, the rearguard of the Frankish army, led by Roland was attacked by the Basque tribes in a confrontation that came to be known as the Battle of Roncevaux Pass. Roland was killed and the rearguard scattered. As a response to the attempted Frankish seizure of Zaragoza, the Córdoban emir retook the city of Pamplona and its surrounding lands. In 781 two local Basque lords, Ibn Balask ("son of Velasco"), and Mothmin al-Akra ("Jimeno the Strong") were defeated and forced to submit. The next mention of Pamplona is in 799, when Mutarrif ibn Musa, thought to have been a governor of the city and a member of the muwallad Banu Qasi family, was killed there by a pro-Frankish faction.

During this period, Basque territory extended on the west to somewhere around the headwaters of the Ebro river. Equally Einhart's Vita Karoli Magni pinpoints the source of the Ebro in the land of the Navarrese. However, this western region fell under the influence of the Kingdom of Asturias.

The Franks renewed their attempts to control the region and in 806 took Navarre under their protection. Following a truce between the Frankish kingdom and Córdoba, in 812 Louis the Pious went to Pamplona, likely to establish there a county that would prove short-lived. However, continued rebellion in Gascony rendered Frankish control south of the Pyrenees tenuous, and the Emirate was able to reclaim the region following victory in the 816 Battle of Pancorbo, in which they defeated and killed the "enemy of Allah", Balask al-Yalaski (Velasco the Gascon), along with the uncle of Alfonso II of Asturias, Garcia ibn Lubb ('son of Lupus'), Sancho, the 'premier knight of Pamplona', and the pagan warrior Ṣaltān. North of the Pyrenees in the same year, Louis the Pious removed Seguin as Duke of Vasconia, which initiated a rebellion, led by Garcia Jiménez, who was killed in 818. Louis's son Pepin, then King of Aquitaine, stamped out the Vasconic revolt in Gascony then hunted the chieftains who had taken refuge in southern Vasconia, i.e., Pamplona and Navarre, no longer controlled by the Franks. He sent an army led by the counts Aeblus and Aznar Sanchez (the latter being appointed lord, but not duke, of Vasconia by Pepin after suppressing the uprising in the duchy), accomplishing their goals with no resistance in Pamplona (which still lacked walls after the 778 destruction). On the way back, however, they were ambushed and defeated in Roncevaux by a force probably composed both of Basques and the Córdoba-allied muwallad Banu Qasi.

== Nascent state and kingdom ==
=== Establishment by Iñigo Arista ===
Out of the pattern of competing Frankish and Córdoban interests, the Basque chieftain Íñigo Arista took power. Tradition tells he was elected as king of Pamplona in 824, giving rise to a dynasty of kings in Pamplona that would last for eighty years. However, the region around Pamplona continued to fall within the sphere of influence of Córdoba, presumably as part of its broader frontier region, the Upper March, ruled by Íñigo's half-brother, Musa ibn Musa al-Qasawi. The city was allowed to remain Christian and have its own administration but had to pay the traditional taxes to the emirate, including the jizya assessed on non-Muslims living under their control. Íñigo Arista is mentioned in Arab records as sâhib (lord) or amîr of the Vascones (bashkunish) and not as malik (king) or tâgiya (tyrant) used for the kings of Asturias and France, indicating the lower status of these ulûj (barbarians, not accepting Islam) within the Córdoba sphere. In 841, in concert with Musa ibn Musa, Íñigo rebelled. Although Musa was eventually forced to submit, Íñigo was still in rebellion at the time of his death in 851/2.

Pamplona and Navarre are distinguished in Carolingian chronicles. Pamplona is cited in 778 as a Navarrese stronghold, which may be due to their lack of information about the Basque territory. The chronicles did distinguish between Navarre and its main town in 806 (In Hispania, vero Navarrensis et Pampelonensis), while the Annals of Fontenelle refers to "Induonis et Mitionis, ducum Navarrorum" (Induo [Íñigo Arista] and Mitio [perhaps Jimeno], dukes of the Navarrese). However, Arab chroniclers make no such distinctions, and just refer to the Baskunisi, a transliteration of Vascones, since a big majority of the population was Basque. The primitive Navarre may have comprised the valleys of Goñi, Gesalaz, Lana, Allin, Deierri, Berrueza and Mañeru, which later formed the merindad of Estella.

The role of Pamplona as a focus coordinating both rebellion against and accommodation with Córdoba seen under Íñigo would continue under his son, García Íñiguez (851/2–882), who formed alliances with Asturias, Gascons, Aragonese and with families in Zaragoza opposed to Musa ibn Musa. This established a pattern of raids and counter-raids, capturing slaves and treasure, as well as full military campaigns that would restore full Córdoban control with renewed oaths of fidelity. His son Fortún Garcés (882-905) spent two decades in Córdoban captivity before succeeding in Pamplona as vassal of the emirate. Neither of these kings would make significant territorial expansion. This period of a fractious, but in the end subservient, Navarre came to an end amidst a period when generalized rebellion within the emirate prevented them from being able to suppress the inertial forces in the western Pyrenees. The ineffectual Fortún was forced to abdicate in favor of a new dynasty from the vehemently anti-Muslim east of Navarre, the founders of which took a less accommodationist view. With this change, al-Andalus sources shift to calling the Pamplona rulers 'tyrants', as with the independent kings of Asturias: Pamplona had passed out of the Córdoban sphere.

=== Jiménez rule ===
The Kingdom of Pamplona (Navarra, orange) c. 910

After taking the political power from Fortún Garcés, Sancho Garcés (905–925), son of Dadilde, sister of Raymond I, Count of Pallars and Ribagorza, proclaimed himself king, terminating the alliance with the Emirate of Córdoba and expanding its domains through the course of the River Ega all the way south to the Ebro and taking the regions of Nájera and Calahorra, which caused the decline of the Banu Qasi family, who ruled these lands. As a response, Abd-ar-Rahman III undertook two expeditions to these lands, earning a victory at the Battle of Valdejunquera, after which the emirate retook the lands south of the River Ebro, and by 924 attacked Pamplona. The daughter of Sancho Garcés, Sancha, was married to the King of León Ordoño II, establishing an alliance with the Leónese kingdom and ensuring the Calahorra region. The valleys of the River Aragón and River Gállego all the way down to Sobrarbe also ended up under control of Pamplona, and to the west the lands of the kingdom reached the counties of Álava and Castile, which were under control of the Kingdom of Asturias. The kingdom had at this time an extent of about 15,000 km^{2}. The Chronicle of Albelda (last updated in 976) outlines the extent in 905 of the Kingdom of Pamplona for the first time. It extended to Nájera and Arba (arguably Araba). Some historians believe that this suggests that it included the Western Basque Country as well:

In era DCCCCXLIIII surrexit in Panpilona rex nomine Sancio Garseanis. Fidei Xpi inseparabiliterque uenerantissimus fuit, pius in omnibus fidefibus misericorsque oppressis catholicis. Quid multa? In omnibus operibus obtimus perstitit. Belligerator aduersus gentes Ysmaelitarum multipficiter strages gessit super Sarrazenos. Idem cepit per Cantabriam a Nagerense urbe usque ad Tutelam omnia castra. Terram quidem Degensem cum opidis cunctam possideuit. Arbam namque Panpilonensem suo iuri subdidit, necnon cum castris omne territorium Aragonense capit. Dehinc expulsis omnibus biotenatis XX' regni sue anno migrauit a seculo. Sepultus sancti Stefani portico regnat cum Xpo in polo (Obiit Sancio Garseanis era DCCCCLXIIII).

In the Era 944 [AD 905] arose in Pamplona a king named Sancio Garseanis. He was a man of unbreakable devotion to the faith of Christ, pious with all the faithful and merciful with oppressed Catholics. What more? In all his actions he performed as a great warrior against the people of the Ismailites; he inflicted multiple disasters on the Saracens. This same captured all the fortified places in the Cantabria, from the city of Nájera to Tudela. Indeed he possessed all the land of Degium [Monjardín, near Lizarra] with its towns. The "Arba" of Pamplona he submitted to his law, and conquered as well all the country of Aragon [then Jaca and nearby lands] with its fortresses. Later, after suppressing all infidels, the twentieth year of his reign he left this world. Buried in the portal of Saint Stephen [Monjardín], he reigns with Christ in Heaven (King Sancho Garcés died in the era 964 [925]).

After the death of Sancho Garcés, the crown passed to his brother, Jimeno Garcés (925–931), joined by Sancho's underage son, García Sánchez (931–970), in his last year. García continued to rule under the tutelage of his mother, Sancho's widow Toda Aznarez, who also engineered several political marriages with the other Christian kingdoms and counties of northern Iberia. Oneca was married to Alfonso IV of León and her sister Urraca to Ramiro II of León, while other daughters of Sancho were married to counts of Castile, Álava and Bigorre. The marriage of the Pamplonese King García Sánchez with Andregoto Galíndez, daughter of Galindo Aznárez II, Count of Aragon linked the eastern county to the kingdom. In 934, he invited Abd-ar-Rahman III to intervene in the kingdom in order to emancipate himself from his mother, and this began a period of tributary status by Pamplona and frequent punitive campaigns from Córdoba.

García Sánchez's heir, Sancho II (970–994), set up his half brother, Ramiro Garcés of Viguera, to rule in the short-lived Kingdom of Viguera. The Historia General de Navarra, by Jaime del Burgo, says that on the occasion of the donation of the villa of Alastue by the king of Pamplona to the monastery of San Juan de la Peña in 987, he styled himself "King of Navarre", the first time that title had been used. In many places he appears as the first King of Navarre and in others the third; however, he was at least the seventh king of Pamplona.

During the late 10th century, Almanzor, the ruler of Al Andalus, frequently led raids against the Christian kingdoms, and attacked the Pamplonese lands on at least nine occasions. In 966, clashes between the Caliphate of Córdoba and the kingdom resulted in the loss of Calahorra and the valley of the River Cidacos. Sancho II, while allied with Castilian militias, suffered a grave defeat in the Battle of Torrevicente. Sancho II was forced to hand over one of his daughters and one of his sons as tokens of peace. After the death of Sancho II and during the reign of García Sánchez II, Pamplona was attacked by the caliphate on several occasions, being completely destroyed in 999, the King himself killed during a raid in the year 1000.

After the death of García Sánchez II, the crown passed to Sancho III, just eight years old at the time, and probably completely controlled by the caliphate. During the first years of his reign the kingdom was ruled by his cousins Sancho and García of Viguera until the year 1004, when Sancho III would become ruling king, mentored by his mother Jimena Fernández. The links with Castile became stronger through marriages. The death of Almanzor in 1002 and his successor Abd al-Malik ibn Marwan in 1008 caused the decline of the Caliphate of Córdoba and the progress of the County of Castile south, while Pamplona, led by Sancho Garcés III, strengthen the position of his kingdom on the borderlands of the Taifa of Zaragoza, controlling the territories of Loarre, Funes, Sos, Uncastillo, Arlas, Caparroso and Boltaña.

The Kingdom of Pamplona (dark orange) in 1000

In the year 1011 Sancho III married Muniadona of Castile, daughter of the Count of Castile, Sancho García. In 1016 the County of Castile and the Kingdom of Navarre made a pact on their future expansion: Pamplona would expand towards the south and east, the eastern region of Soria and the Ebro valley, including territories that were at the time part of Zaragoza. Thus, the Kingdom of Pamplona comprised a territory of 15,000 km^{2} between Pamplona, Nájera and Aragón with vassals of Pamplonese and Aragonese origin.

The assassination of Count García Sánchez of Castile in 1028 allowed Sancho to appoint his younger son Ferdinand as count. He also exerted a protectorate over the Duchy of Gascony. He seized the country of the Pisuerga and the Cea, which belonged to the Kingdom of León, and marched armies to the heart of that kingdom, forcing king Bermudo III of León to flee to a Galician refuge. Sancho thereby effectively ruled the north of Iberia from the boundaries of Galicia to those of the County of Barcelona.

By the time of the death of Sancho III in 1035, the kingdom had reached its greatest historical extent. Sancho III wrote a problematic will, in which he divided his territory into three kingdoms.

=== Ecclesiastical affairs ===
In this period of independence, the ecclesiastical affairs of the country reached a high state of development. Sancho the Great was brought up at Leyre, which was also for a short time the capital of the Diocese of Pamplona. Beside this see, there existed the Bishopric of Oca, which was united in 1079 to the Diocese of Burgos. In 1035 Sancho III re-established the See of Palencia, which had been laid waste at the time of the Moorish invasion. When, in 1045, the city of Calahorra was wrested from the Moors, under whose dominion it had been for more than three hundred years, a see was also founded there, which in the same year absorbed the Diocese of Nájera and, in 1088, the Diocese of Álava, the jurisdiction of which covered about the same ground as that of the present Diocese of Vitoria. The See of Pamplona owed its re-establishment to Sancho III, who for this purpose convened a synod at Leyre in 1022 and one at Pamplona in 1023. These synods likewise instituted a reform of ecclesiastical life, with the above-named convent as a centre.

== Dismemberment ==
=== Division of Sancho's domains ===
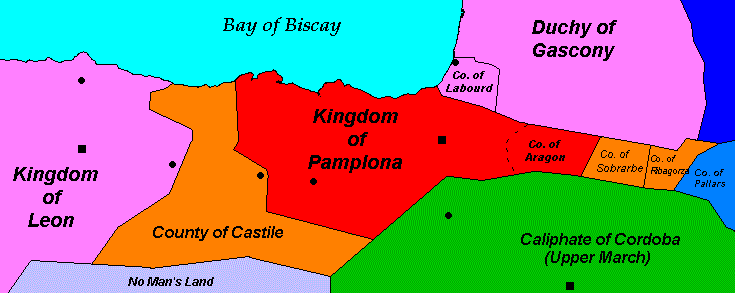
Domains of Sancho III the Great Kingdom of Pamplona other possessions direct influence

At its greatest extent the Kingdom of Navarre included all the modern Spanish province; the northern slope of the western Pyrenees the Spaniards called the ultra puertos ("country beyond the mountain passes") or French Navarre; the Basque provinces of Spain and France; the Bureba, the valley between the Basque mountains and the Montes de Oca to the north of Burgos; and the Rioja and Tarazona in the upper valley of the Ebro. On his death, Sancho divided his possessions among his four sons. Sancho the Great's realm was never again united (until Ferdinand the Catholic): Castile was permanently joined to León, whereas Aragon enlarged its territory, joining Catalonia through a marriage.

Following the traditional succession customs, the first-born son of Sancho III, García Sánchez III, received the title and lands of the Kingdom of Pamplona, which included the territory of Pamplona, Nájera and parts of Aragon. The rest of the territory was given to his widow Muniadona of Castile to split among all the legitimate sons: thus García Sánchez III also received the territory to the northeast from the County of Castile (La Bureba, Montes de Oca) and the County of Álava. Ferdinand received the rest of the County of Castile and the lands between the Pisuerga and the Cea. Another son of Sancho, Gonzalo, received the counties of Sobrarbe and Ribargoza as vassal of his eldest brother, García. Lands in Aragon were allotted to Sancho's bastard son Ramiro.

=== Partition and union with Aragon ===
Navarre (yellow) in 1037

Division of the Kingdom of Pamplona after the death of Sancho Garcés IV in 1076 Area occupied by Alfonso VI of Castile Area occupied by Sancho Ramírez of Aragon County of Navarre, vassal of Castile

García Sánchez III (1035–1054) soon found himself struggling for supremacy against his ambitious brothers, especially Ferdinand. García had supported the armed conflict between Ferdinand and his brother-in-law Bermudo III of León, who was ultimately killed in the Battle of Tamarón (1037). This allowed Ferdinand to unite his Castilian county with the new-won crown of León as king Ferdinand I. For several years a mutual collaboration between the two kingdoms took place. The relationship between García and his step-brother Ramiro was better. The latter had acquired all of Aragon, Ribagorza and Sobrarbe on the sudden death of his brother Gonzalo, forming what would become the Kingdom of Aragon. García and Ramiro's alliance with Ramon Berenguer, the Count of Barcelona, was effective to keep the Muslim Taifa of Zaragoza at bay. After the capture of Calahorra in 1044, a period peace followed on the southern border and trade was established with Zaragoza.

The relationship between García and Ferdinand deteriorated with time, the two disputing the lands on the Pamplonese-Castilian border, and ended violently in September 1054 at the Battle of Atapuerca, in which García was killed, and Ferdinand took from Pamplona the lands in La Bureba and the Tirón River.

García was succeeded by Sancho IV (1054–1076) of Peñalén, whom Ferdinand had recognised as king of Pamplona immediately after the death of his father. He was fourteen years old at the time, and under the regency of his mother Stephanie and his uncles Ferdinand and Ramiro. After the death of his mother in 1058, Sancho IV lost the support of the local nobility, and the relations between them worsened after he became allied with Ahmad al-Muqtadir, ruler of Zaragoza. On 4 June 1076, a conspiracy involving Sancho IV's brother Ramón and sister Ermesinda ended with the murder of the king. The neighboring kingdoms and the nobility probably had a part in the plot.

The dynastic crisis resulting from Sancho's assassination worked to the benefit of the Castilian and Aragonese monarchs. Alfonso VI of León and Castile took control of La Rioja, the Lordship of Biscay, the County of Álava, the County of Durango and part of Gipuzkoa. Sancho Ramírez, successor to his father, Ramiro of Aragon, took control of the rest of the territory and was recognised as king by the Pamplonese nobility. The land around the city of Pamplona, the core of the original kingdom, became known as the County of Navarre, and was recognised by Alfonso VI as a vassal state of the kingdom of León and Castile. Sancho Ramírez began in 1084 a renewed military expansion of the southern lands controlled by Muslim forces. That year, the city of Arguedas, from which the Bardenas region could be controlled, was taken. After the death of Sancho Ramírez in 1094, he was succeeded by Peter I, who resumed the expansion of the territory, taking the cities of Sádaba in 1096 and Milagro in 1098, while threatening Tudela.

Alfonso the Battler (1104–1134), brother of Peter I, secured for the country its greatest territorial expansion. He wrested Tudela from the Moors (1114), re-conquered the entire country of Bureba, which Navarre had lost in 1042, and advanced into the current Province of Burgos. He also annexed Labourd, with its strategic port of Bayonne, but lost its coastal half to the Duchy of Aquitaine soon after. The remainder has been part of Navarre since then and eventually came to be known as Lower Navarre. Toward the south, he moved the Islamic border to the Ebro river, with Rioja, Nájera, Logroño, Calahorra, and Alfaro added to his domain. In 1118, the city of Zaragoza was taken by the Aragonese forces, and on 25 February 1119 the city of Tudela was taken and incorporated into Pamplona.

The 1127 Peace of Támara delimited the territorial domains of the Castilian and Aragonese realms, the latter including Pamplona. The lands of Biscay, Álava, Gipuzkoa, Belorado, Soria and San Esteban de Gormaz went back to the Pamplonese kingdom.

=== Restoration and the loss of western Navarre ===
The status quo between Aragon and Castile stood until the 1134 death of Alfonso. Being childless, he willed his realm to the military orders, particularly the Templars. This decision was rejected by the cortes (parliaments) of both Aragon and Navarre, which then chose separate kings.

García Ramírez, known as the Restorer, was the first King of Navarre to use such a title. He was Lord of Monzón, a grandson of Rodrigo Diaz de Vivar, El Cid, and a descendant by illegitimate line of King García Sánchez III. Sancho Garcia, known as Sancho VI "the Wise" (1150–1194), a patron of learning, as well as an accomplished statesman, fortified Navarre within and without, granted charters (fueros) to a number of towns, and was never defeated in battle. He was the first king to issue royal documents entitling him rex Navarrae or rex Navarrorum, appealing to a wider power base, defined as politico-juridical by Urzainqui (a "populus"), beyond Pamplona and the customary rex Pampilonensium. As attested in the charters of San Sebastián and Vitoria-Gasteiz (1181), the natives are called Navarri, as well as in another contemporary document at least, where those living to the north of Peralta are defined as Navarrese. (Note: But not the inhabitants of Peralta; the lingua navarrorum is attested as the Basque language.)

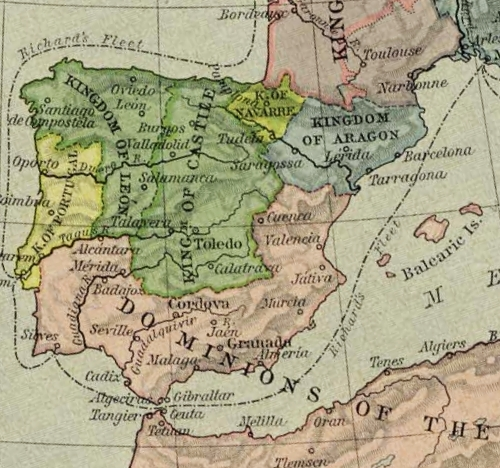
Navarre (light green) in 1190

The Restorer and Sancho the Wise were faced with an ever-increasing intervention of Castile in Navarre. In 1170, Alfonso VIII of Castile and Eleanor, daughter of Henry II of England, married, with the Castilian king claiming Gascony as part of the dowry. It turned out a much needed pretext for the invasion of Navarre during the following years (1173–1176), with a special focus on Navarre's coastal districts, coveted by Castile in order to become a maritime power. In 1177, the dispute was submitted to arbitration by Henry II of England. The Navarrese made their point on a number of claims, namely "the proven will of the locals" (fide naturalium hominum suorum exhibita), the assassination of the King Sancho Garces IV of Navarre by the Castilians (per violentiam fuit expulsus, 1076), as well as law and custom, while the Castilians made their case by citing the Castilian takeover following the death of Sancho Garces IV, the dynastic links of Alfonso with Navarre, and the conquest of Toledo. Henry did not dare issue a verdict based entirely on the legal grounds as presented by both sides, instead deciding to refer them back to the boundaries held by both kingdoms at the start of their reigns in 1158, besides agreeing to a truce of seven years. It thus confirmed the permanent loss of the Bureba and Rioja areas for the Navarrese. However, soon, Castile breached the compromise, starting a renewed effort to harass Navarre both in the diplomatic and military arenas.

The rich dowry of Berengaria, daughter of Sancho VI the Wise and Blanche of Castile, made her a desirable catch for Richard I of England. His mother, Eleanor of Aquitaine, crossed the Pyrenean passes to escort Berengaria to Sicily, eventually to wed Richard in Cyprus, on 12 May 1191. She remains the only Queen of England who never set foot in England during her reign. The reign of Sancho the Wise's successor, the last king of the male line of Sancho the Great and the kings of Pamplona, Sancho VII the Strong (Sancho el Fuerte) (1194–1234), was more troubled. He appropriated the revenues of churches and convents, granting them instead important privileges; in 1198 he presented to the See of Pamplona his palaces and possessions there; this gift was confirmed by Pope Innocent III on 29 January 1199.

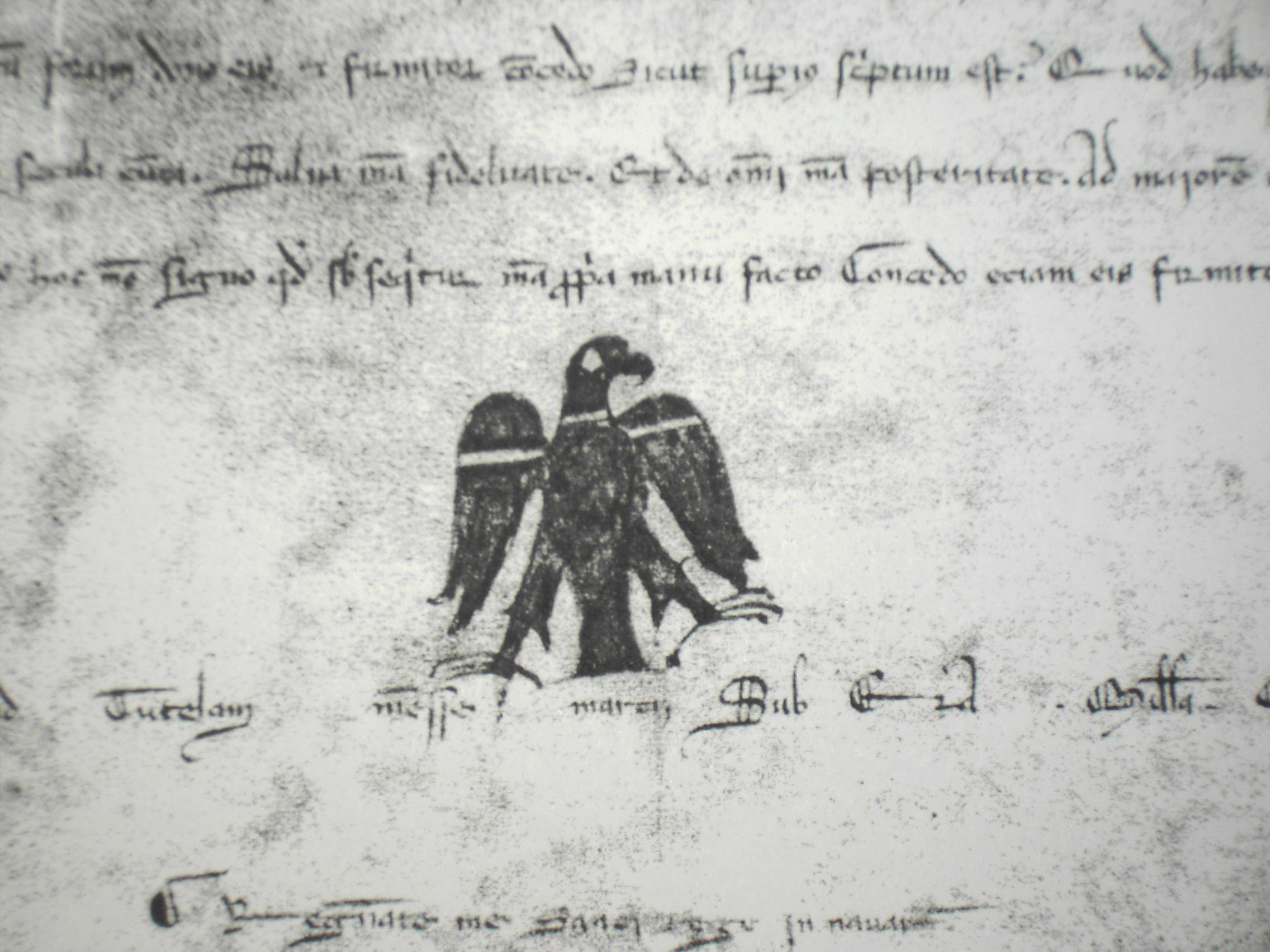
Sigil of King Sancho VII the Strong

In 1199 Alfonso VIII of Castile, son of Sancho III of Castile and Blanche of Navarre, was determined to take over coastal Navarre, a strategic region that would allow Castile much easier access to European wool markets and would isolate Navarre as well. He launched a massive expedition against Navarre.Sancho the Strong was abroad in Tlemcen (modern Algeria) seeking support to counter the Castilian push, by opening a second front. Pope Celestine III intervened to frustrate the alliance.

The towns of Vitoria and Treviño resisted the Castilian assault but the Bishop of Pamplona was sent to inform them that no reinforcements would arrive. After nine months of siege, Vitoria surrendered, but Treviño did not, having to be conquered by force of arms. By 1200 the conquest of western Navarre was complete. Castile allowed these territories (with the exceptions of Treviño and Oñati, which were directly ruled from Castile) the right to keep their traditional customs and laws (viz., Navarrese law), which came to be known as fueros. Alava was made a county, Biscay a lordship and Gipuzkoa just a province. In 1207, an arrangement in Guadalajara between both kings sealed a 5-year truce over the occupied territories; still Castile kept a fait accompli policy.

Sancho the Strong would join in the Battle of Las Navas de Tolosa (1212), where he added his small force to the Christian alliance that was victorious over the Caliph Muhammand An-Nasir. He suffered from a varicose ulcer in his leg that led him to retire to Tudela, where he died in 1234. His elder sister Berengaria, Queen of England, had died childless some years earlier. His deceased younger sister Blanca, countess of Champagne, had left a son, Theobald IV of Champagne. Thus the Kingdom of Navarre, though the crown was still claimed by the kings of Aragon, passed by marriage to the House of Champagne, firstly to the heirs of Blanca, who were simultaneously counts of Champagne and Brie, with the support of the Navarrese Parliament (Cortes).

== Navarre in the Late Middle Ages ==
=== Rule by Champagne and France ===
Arms of the monarchs of Navarre of the House of Évreux with the royal crest

Navarre possessions in France 1360

Map of France and the Pyrenees in 1477 showing the Kingdom of Navarre and the Principality of Béarn

Theobald I made of his court a centre where the poetry of the troubadours that had developed at the court of the counts of Champagne was welcomed and fostered; his reign was peaceful. His son, King Theobald II (1253–70), married Isabella, daughter of King Louis IX of France, and accompanied his saintly father-in-law upon his crusade to Tunis. On the homeward journey, he died at Trapani in Sicily, and was succeeded by his brother, King Henry I, who had already assumed the reins of government during his absence, but ruled for only three years (1271–74). His daughter, Queen Joan I, ascended as a minor and the country was once again invaded from all sides. The queen and her mother, Blanche of Artois, sought refuge at the court of King Philip III of France. His son, the future King Philip IV of France, had become engaged to the young sovereign and married her in 1284. From 1276, the time of the negotiations for this marriage, Navarre effectively passed into French control, though not without the French suppression of native resistance in the 1276-1277 War of the Navarreria.

The Kingdom of Navarre remained in personal union with the Kingdom of France until the death of King Charles I (Charles IV of France) in 1328, and on March 13 of the same year, Don Juan Martínez de Medrano and Don Juan Corbaran de Lehet were appointed regents of the Kingdom of Navarre for 11 months (February 27, 1329) until the succession in Navarre was resolved. King Charles was succeeded by his niece, Queen Joanna II, daughter of King Louis I (Louis X of France), and nephew-in-law, King Philip III. Joanna waived all claim to the throne of France and accepted as compensation for the counties of Champagne and Brie those of Angoulême, Longueville, and Mortain.

King Philip III devoted himself to the improvement of the laws of the country, and joined King Alfonso XI of Castile in battle against the Moors of 1343. After the death of his mother (1349), King Charles II assumed the reins of government (1349–87). He played an important part in the Hundred Years' War and in the French civil unrest of the time, and on account of his deceit and cruelty he received the epithet of 'the Bad'. He gained and lost possessions in Normandy and, later in his reign, the Navarrese Company acquired island possessions in the Byzantine Empire.

His eldest son, on the other hand, King Charles III the Noble, once more returned the land to peaceful and happy government (1387–1425). He reformed the government, built canals, and made the tributaries of the Ebro flowing through Navarre navigable. As he outlived his legitimate sons, he was succeeded by his daughter, Queen Blanche I (1425–1441), and son-in-law, King John II (1398–1479).

=== Navarre under the Foix and Albret dynasties ===
After Queen Blanche I of Navarre's death in 1441, Navarre was mired in continued disputes over royal succession. King John II was ruling in Aragon in the name of his brother, Alfonso V of Aragon. He left his son, Charles, Prince of Viana, with merely the rank of governor, whereas Queen Blanche I had intended him to succeed her, as was the custom. In 1450, John II himself came back to Navarre, and, urged on by his ambitious second wife Juana Enriquez, endeavoured to obtain the succession for their son Ferdinand.

Mirroring inter-clan disputes during the bloody War of the Bands in the rest of the Basque territories, in 1451 Navarre split in two confederacies, the Agramonts and the Beaumonts, over royal succession, with ramifications both within and outside Navarre. In the violent civil war that broke out, the Agramonts sided with John II, and the Beaumonts — named after their leader, the chancellor, John of Beaumont — espoused the cause of Charles, Prince of Viana. The fights involved the high aristocracy and their junior branches, who carried on the feuds of their senior lines and thrived on weak, often absent, royal authority.

The unhappy Prince Charles was defeated by his father at Aibar in 1451, and held prisoner for two years, during which he wrote his famous Chronicle of Navarre, a major source for the period. After his release, Charles sought the assistance of King Charles VII of France and his uncle Alfonso V (who resided in Naples), but in vain. In 1460 he was again imprisoned at the instigation of his stepmother, but the Catalans rose in revolt at this injustice, and he was again liberated and named governor of Catalonia. He died in 1461, poisoned by his stepmother Juana Enríquez without being able to retake the reins of Navarre. He had named as heir his next sister, Queen Blanche II, but she was immediately imprisoned by John II and died in 1464. While this episode of the civil war came to an end, it inaugurated a period of instability including on-off periods of struggle and uprisings all the way to the Spanish conquest (1512).

On Charles' demise in 1461, Eleanor of Navarre, Countess of Foix and Béarn, was proclaimed Princess of Viana, but the instability took a toll. The south-western tip of Navarre—the Sonsierra (Oyon, Laguardia, in present-day Álava), and Los Arcos—was occupied by Henry IV of Castile. Castile's eventual annexation of this territory in 1463 was upheld by the French King Louis XI in Bayonne on 23 April 1463. John II continued to rule as king up to 1479, when Queen Eleanor succeeded him for only 15 days and then died; she left the crown to her grandson, Francis Phoebus, but this inaugurated another period of instability. Eleanor's 13-year-old granddaughter Catherine I of Navarre succeeded her brother Francis Phoebus in accordance with his will (1483). As a minor she remained under the guardianship of her mother, Magdalena of Valois, and was sought by Ferdinand the Catholic as a bride. However, another claimant to the throne was stubbornly trying to stop her, John of Foix, Viscount of Narbonne, brother-in-law of the future French King Louis XII. Invoking the French Salic Law, he called himself King of Navarre and sent diplomats to Ferdinand II.

Pressure built on Catherine's regent Magdalena of Valois who, intent on saving their French possessions, eventually decided to marry the young Queen to the 7-year-old John of Albret, despite the Parliament of Navarre's preference for John, Prince of Asturias, son of Ferdinand and Isabella. The Beaumont party rose up, while the Agramonts split over the marriage. Ferdinand II of Aragon in turn reconsidered his diplomatic policy on Navarre. The crown of Navarre fell back on their default policy of diplomacy, and signed the Treaty of Valencia on 21 March 1488, whereby trade was restored between Navarre and the Aragon-Castile tandem. Still, Ferdinand did not recognize Catherine and installed Castilian troops in Navarre, banning French troops in both the kingdom and the Viscounty of Béarn.

"Before the sacrament of the holy unction is completed, this blessed coronation of yours, it is necessary for Your Royal Majesties to swear an oath to the people, as the monarchs of Navarre preceding you did formerly, so that the people can also swear an oath to you as set by custom [...] we swear [...] to the prelates, nobles [...] and men of the cities and good towns and all the people of Navarre [...] from all across the Kingdom of Navarre [...] all the fueros, as well as the mores, and customs, tax exemptions, liberties, privileges held by each of you—either here or absent."
Instructions to the monarchs Catherine and John III on the mandatory oath owed to the Kingdom of Navarre, and the oath itself, ahead of their coronation (1494).

Ferdinand also pushed for the introduction of the coercive cross-border tribunal, the Inquisition, which the Navarrese hated, but, under pressure from the Aragonese monarch, the doors of Navarre (Tudela) finally opened to the Church institution between 1486 and 1488, pushed by the Aragonese monarch's threats. Still, in 1510 the authorities of Tudela decreed the expulsion of the monk "calling himself inquisitor." Catherine and John III also lacked French royal support: both Charles VIII and Louis XII pushed hard to have John of Foix declared king. Finally, following a short period of peace with Ferdinand after a treaty was signed, in January 1494 the coronation of the royal family took place in Pamplona. The monarchs Catherine I and John III swore an oath to respect the liberties of Navarre, and the proclamation was celebrated with a week-long festival, while the ceremony was not attended by the Aragonese bishops with jurisdiction in Navarre. During this period, the realm of Navarre-Beárn was defined by Emperor Maximilian I's diplomat Müntzer as a nation like Switzerland. In the same treaty, Ferdinand renounced war on Navarre or Béarn from Castile, but the attempt to restore royal authority and patrimony met with the resistance of the defiant Louis de Beaumont, 2nd Count de Lerín, whose estates were confiscated.

Catherine and John III's guardian Magdalena of Valois died in 1495 and John's father Alain I of Albret signed another treaty with Ferdinand, whereby the count of Lerín should abandon Navarre, receiving in compensation real estate and various enclaves in the recently conquered Granada. In exchange, Alain made an array of painful concessions: Ferdinand received the count of Lerín's patrimony and gained control of important fortresses across Navarre, including the right to keep a garrison in Olite at the heart of the kingdom. Also, Queen Catherine's one-year-old daughter Magdalena was to be sent to Castile to be raised, with a plan on a future marriage - she would die young in Castile (1504). Following developments in France, the whole treaty was reverted in 1500 and another compromise was reached with Ferdinand, ensuring peace for another four years.

Navarrese Jews were forced to leave or to convert in 1498.

=== Spanish conquest ===
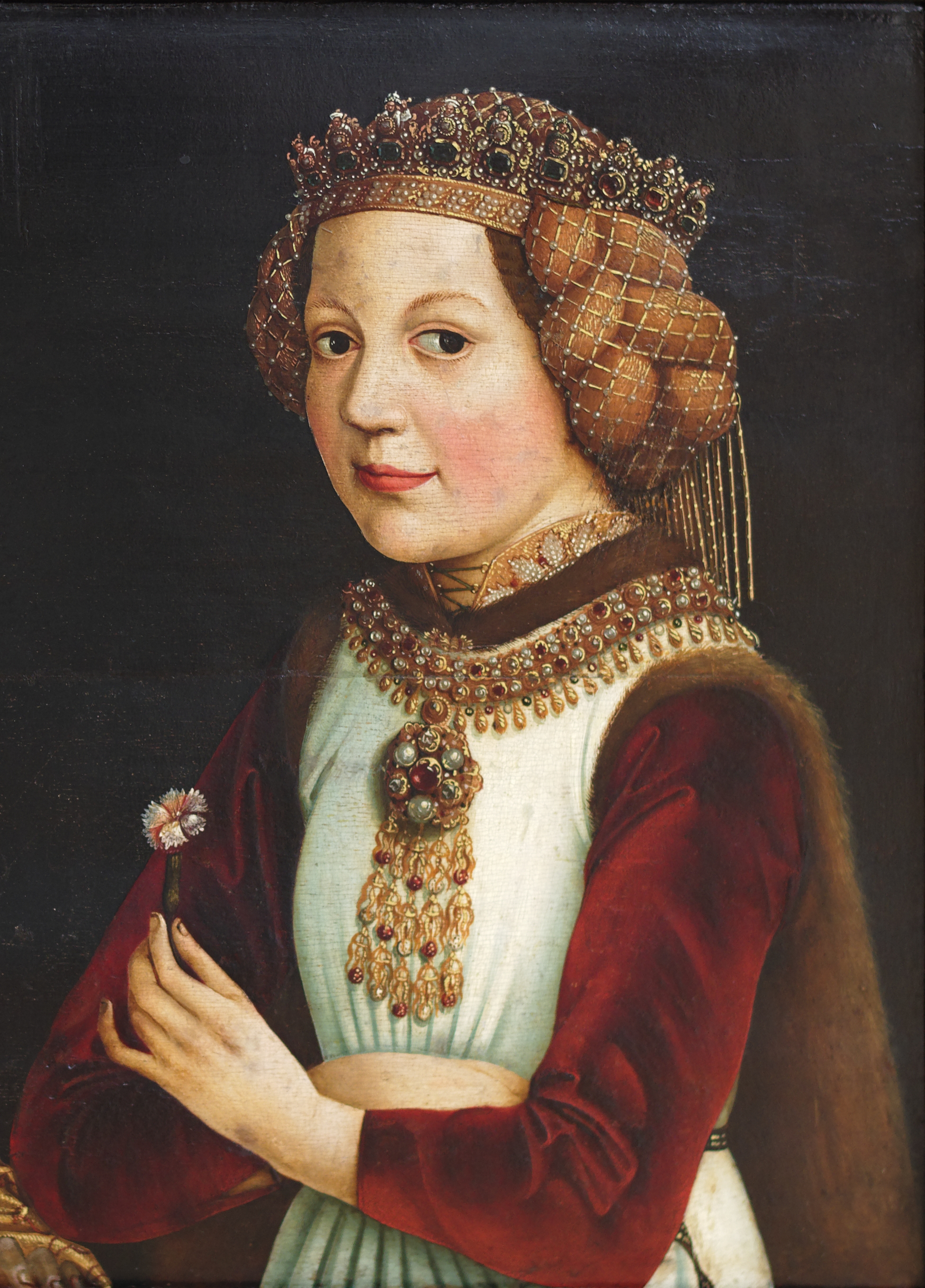
Magdalena of Valois, regent of Navarre from 1479 to 1494, and mother of Queen Catherine I of Navarre

In spite of the treaties, Ferdinand the Catholic did not relinquish his long-cherished designs on Navarre. In 1506, the 53-year-old widower remarried, to Germaine of Foix (aged 16), daughter of Catherine's uncle John of Foix, who had attempted to claim Navarre over his under-age nephew and niece. However, their infant son died shortly after birth, ending hopes of a possible inheritance of Navarre. Ferdinand kept intervening directly or indirectly in the internal affairs of Navarre by means of the Beaumont party. In 1508, the Navarrese royal troops finally suppressed a rebellion of the count of Lerín after a long standoff. In a letter to the rebellious count, the king of Aragon insisted that while he may take over one stronghold or another, he should use "theft, deceit and bargain" instead of violence (23 July 1509).

When Navarre refused to join one of many Holy Leagues against France and declared itself neutral, Ferdinand asked the Pope to excommunicate Albret, which would have legitimised an attack. The Pope was reluctant to label the crown of Navarre as schismatic explicitly in a first bull against the French and the Navarrese (21 July 1512), but Ferdinand's pressure bore fruit when a (second) bull named Catherine and John III "heretic" (18 February 1513). On 18 July 1512, Don Fadrique de Toledo was sent to invade Navarre in the context of the second phase of the War of the League of Cambrai.

Unable to face the powerful Castilian-Aragonese army, Jean d'Albret fled to Béarn (Orthez, Pau, Tarbes). Pamplona, Estella, Olite, Sanguesa, and Tudela were captured by September. The Agramont party sided with Queen Catherine while most, but not all, of the Beaumont party lords supported the occupiers. In October 1512, the legitimate King John III returned with an army recruited north of the Pyrenees and attacked Pamplona without success. By the end of December the Castilians were in St-Jean-Pied-de-Port.

After this failure, the Navarrese Cortes (Parliament) had no option but pledge loyalty to King Ferdinand. In 1513, the first Castilian viceroy took a formal oath to respect Navarrese institutions and law (fueros). The Spanish Inquisition was extended into Navarre. The Jews had already been forced into conversion or exile by the Alhambra Decree in Castile and Aragon, and now the Jewish community of Navarre and the Muslims of Tudela suffered its persecution.

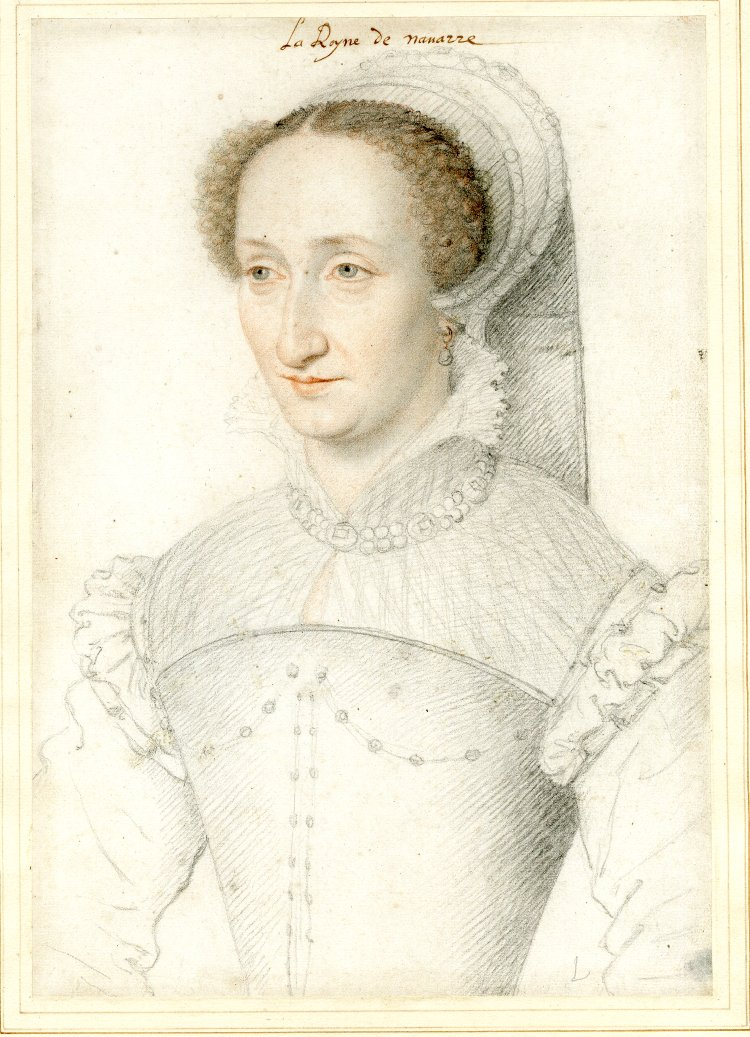
Jeanne III

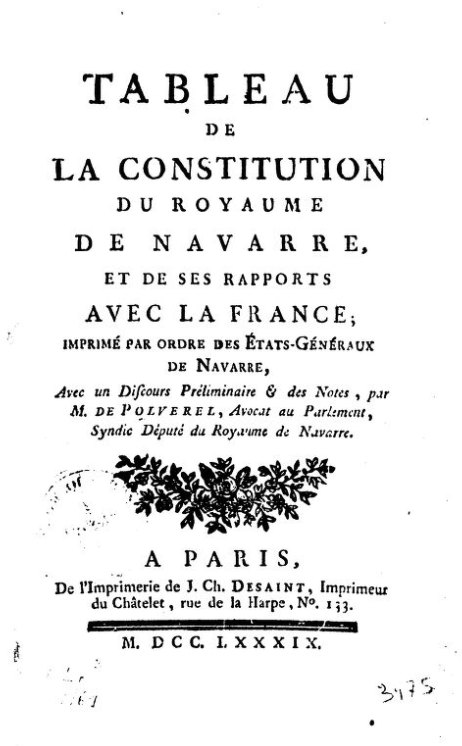
Defense of Navarre presented by Polverel (1789)

There were two more attempts at liberation in 1516 and 1521, both supported by popular rebellion, especially the second one. It was in 1521 that the Navarrese came closest to regaining their independence. As a liberation army commanded by General Asparros approached Pamplona, the citizens rose in revolt and besieged the military governor, Iñigo de Loyola, in his newly built castle. Tudela and other cities also declared their loyalty to the House of Albret. While at first distracted due to only recently overcoming the Revolt of the Comuneros, the Navarrese-Béarnese army managed to liberate all the kingdom, but shortly thereafter Asparros faced a large Castilian army at the Battle of Noáin on 30 June 1521. Asparros was captured, and the army completely defeated.

=== Independent Navarre north of the Pyrenees ===
A small portion of Navarre north of the Pyrenees, Lower Navarre, along with the neighbouring Viscounty of Béarn, survived as an independent kingdom which passed by inheritance. In 1523, the Estates of Lower Navarre were first called into session by King Henry II.

In 1560, Jeanne III, the Queen of Navarre, converted to Calvinism. She commissioned a translation of the New Testament into Basque, which became one of the first books published in the language. Jeanne also declared Calvinism the official religion of Navarre. She and her son, Henry III, led the Huguenot party in the French Wars of Religion. In 1589, Henry became the sole rightful claimant to the crown of France, though he was not recognized as such by many of his subjects until his conversion to Catholicism four years later.

The last independent king of Navarre, Henry III (reigned 1572–1610), succeeded to the throne of France as Henry IV in 1589, founding the Bourbon dynasty. Between 1620 and 1624, Lower Navarre and Béarn were incorporated into France proper by Henry's son, Louis XIII of France (Louis II of Navarre). The Parliament of Navarre, seated at Pau, was also created by merging the royal Chancery of Navarre and the Sovereign Council of Béarn.

The 1659 Treaty of the Pyrenees put an end to the litigation over the definite French-Spanish borders and to any French-Navarrese dynastic claim over Spanish Navarre. The title of King of Navarre continued to be used by the Kings of France until the French Revolution in 1792, and was revived again during the Restoration from 1814–30. Since the rest of Navarre was in Spanish hands, the kings of Spain would also use the title of King of Navarre, and continue to do so. During the Estates General of 1789, the Estates of Navarre sent Étienne Polverel to Paris to defend the idiosyncrasy and independence of Navarre in the face of the planned homogenizing administrative layout of France.

== The crown and the kingdom: A constitutional foundation ==
Spanish royal coat of arms variant of Spain used in Navarre, House of Habsburg (1580–1668)

As the Kingdom of Navarre was originally organized, it was divided into merindades, districts governed by a merino ("mayorino", a sheriff), the representative of the king. They were the "Ultrapuertos" (French Navarre), Pamplona, Estella, Tudela and Sangüesa. In 1407 the merindad of Olite was added. The Cortes of Navarre began as the king's council of churchmen and nobles, but in the course of the 14th century the burgesses were added. Their presence was due to the fact that the king had need of their co-operation to raise money by grants and aids, a development that was being paralleled in England.

The Cortes henceforth consisted of the churchmen, the nobles and the representatives of twenty-seven (later thirty-eight) "good towns"—towns which were free of a feudal lord, and, therefore, held directly by the king. The independence of the burgesses was better secured in Navarre than in other parliaments of Spain by the constitutional rule which required the consent of a majority of each order to every act of the Cortes. Thus the burgesses could not be outvoted by the nobles and the Church, as they could be elsewhere. Even in the 18th century the Navarrese successfully resisted Bourbon attempts to establish custom houses on the French frontier, dividing French from Spanish Navarre.

The institutions of Navarre which maintained their autonomy until the 19th century included the Cortes (The Three States, precursor to the Parliament of Navarre), Royal Council, Supreme Court and Diputacion del Reino. Similar institutions existed in the Crown of Aragon (in Aragon, Catalonia and Valencia) until the Nueva Planta decrees. The Spanish monarch was represented by a viceroy, who could object to the decisions made in the Navarrese context.

During that period Navarre enjoyed a special status within the Spanish monarchy; it had its own cortes, taxation system, and separate customs laws. On 17 January, 1645, García de Medrano became the regent of Navarre, and Pedro Antonio de Medrano became regent of Navarre on 9 May 1702.

== Later history and the end of the fueros ==
By the time of the War of the Pyrenees and the Peninsular War, Navarre was in a deep crisis over the Spanish royal authority, involving the Spanish prime minister Manuel Godoy, who bitterly opposed the Basque charters and their autonomy, and maintained high duty exactions on the Ebro customs against the Navarrese, and the Basques as a whole. The only way out the Navarrese found was an increased trade with France, which in turn spurred the importation of bourgeois, modern ideas. However, the progressive, enlightened bourgeois circles strong in Pamplona—and other Basque towns and cities like Donostia—were eventually quelled during the above wars.

After the French defeat, the only source of support for Navarrese self-government was Ferdinand VII. The king wielded the flag of the ancient régime, as opposed to the liberal Constitution of Cádiz (1812), which ignored the Navarrese and Basque fueros and any different identities in Spain, or the "Spains", as it was considered legally until the 19th century.

During the Napoleonic Wars, many in Navarre took to the bush to avoid tax exactions and the military abuses over property and people during their expeditions, be they French, English, or Spanish. These parties sowed the seeds of the later militias of the Carlist Wars acting under different banners, Carlists most often, but also pro-fueros liberals. However, once the local, urban based enlightened bourgeois were suppressed by the Spanish authorities and bristled at despotic French rule during the occupation, the most staunchly Catholic rose to prominence in Navarre, coming under strong clerical influence.

This, and the resentment felt at the loss of their autonomy when they were incorporated into Spain in 1833, account for the strong support given by many Navarrese to the Carlist cause. In 1833, Navarre and the whole Basque region in Spain became the chief stronghold of the Carlists, but in 1837 a Spanish Liberal, centralist constitution was proclaimed in Madrid, and Isabella II recognized as queen. Following the August 31, 1839, armistice putting an end to the First Carlist War, Navarre remained in a shaky state.

Its separate status was acknowledged on the Act promulgated in October that year, but after arrival of Baldomero Espartero and the anti-fueros Progressives to office in Madrid, talks with Navarrese Liberal negotiators led to a near-assimilation of Navarre with the Spanish province. Navarre was not a kingdom any more, but another Spanish province. In exchange for giving up self-government, the Navarrese were compensated with the Compromise Act (Spanish: Ley Paccionada) in 1841, a set of tax, administrative and other prerogatives, conjuring an idea of 'compromise between two equal sides', and not a granted charter.

== Province of Spain ==
Following the 1839–1841 treaties, conflict with Madrid's central government over Navarre's agreed administrative and fiscal idiosyncrasies contributed to the Third Carlist War (1872–76), largely centred in the Basque districts. Myriad parties and factions emerged in Navarre demanding different degrees of restoration of native institutions and laws. Catholicism and traditionalism became major driving forces behind Navarrese politics.

The Church in Navarre became a mainstay of the reactionary Spanish Nationalists uprising against the Second Spanish Republic (1936). The figure of progressives and inconvenient dissidents exterminated across Navarre is estimated at around 3,000 in the period immediately after the successful military uprising (July 1936). As a reward for its support in the Spanish Civil War, Franco allowed Navarre, as it happened with Álava, to maintain some prerogatives reminiscent of the ancient Navarrese liberties. Navarre's specific status during Franco's regime led to the present-day Chartered Community of Navarre during the Spanish transition to democracy (the so-called Amejoramiento, 1982).

== Territory today ==
The territory formerly known as Navarre now belongs to two nations, Spain and France, depending on whether it lies south or north of the Western Pyrenees. The Basque language is still spoken in most of the provinces. Today, Navarre is an autonomous community of Spain and Basse-Navarre is part of France's Pyrénées-Atlantiques département. Other former Navarrese territories belong now to several autonomous communities of Spain: the Autonomous Community of the Basque Country, La Rioja, Aragon, and Castile and León.

== Historical symbols ==
Coat of Arms of the Kingdom of Navarre during the reign of Sancho VI

Sign of Sancho VII

Seal of Sancho VII
(reverse)

Coat of Arms of the Kingdom of Navarre, 1234–1580

Royal Badge of the Medieval Monarchs of Navarre

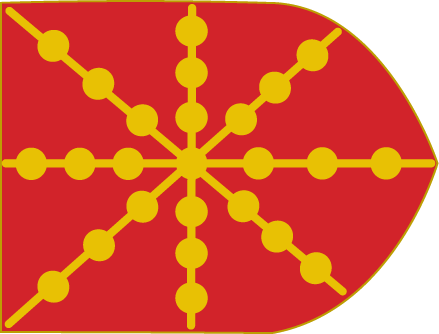
Standard of the Medieval Monarchs of Navarre since 1212

== See also ==
- Chartered community of Navarre (modern)
- List of Navarrese monarchs
- Kings of Navarre family tree
- Court officials of the Kingdom of Navarre
- Basque Country (historical territory)
- Basque and Pyrenean Fueros
- History of the Basque people
- History of Pamplona
- Vascones
- Amaya o los vascos en el siglo VIII, a historic novel mixing history and legend about the origins of monarchy in Navarre.

Historic languages of the Kingdom of Navarre (824–1841):

- Basque, natural language in most of the realm except for the southern plains (Ribera), 824–1841
- Navarro-Aragonese, natural language along the Ebro, in the south-east, some boroughs, and status language, 10–15th century
- Occitan, natural language in some boroughs, status language, 11–14th century
- Castilian language, natural language in southern and increasingly central areas and many urban centres substituting Basque, status language, 15th century – 1841
- Gascon, written language in Lower Navarre and limited geographical and social contexts, 1305–1790
- Arabic, language of the Muslim communities remaining in southern areas after the conquest of Tudela in 1118, as well as Muslim liturgy language, 824–14th century and 824–early 16th century respectively
- French, status language increasingly replacing Gascon (Béarnese) in administration and politics, 1624–1790
- Erromintxela, language used by the native Romani communities especially in hilly areas, 15th century – 1841
- Hebrew, religious and written language in Jewish communities located in certain urban centres, 10th century – 1512
- Latin, Christian Catholic liturgy language and formal language in written scripts increasingly replaced by other Romance languages, 824–1841

== General and cited references ==
- Arigita y Lasa, Colección de documentos para la historia de Navarra (Pamplona, 1900)
- Azurmendi, Joxe: "Die Bedeutung der Sprache in Renaissance und Reformation und die Entstehung der baskischen Literatur im religiösen und politischen Konfliktgebiet zwischen Spanien und Frankreich" In: Wolfgang W. Moelleken (Herausgeber), Peter J. Weber (Herausgeber): Neue Forschungsarbeiten zur Kontaktlinguistik, Bonn: Dümmler, 1997. ISBN 978-3-537-86419-2
- Bascle de Lagreze, La Navarre française (Paris, 1881)
- Blade, Les Vascons espagnols (Agen, 1891)
- Boissonade, Pierre, Histoire de la reunion de la Navarre à la Castille (Paris, 1893)
- Chappuys, Histoire du royaume de Navarre (Paris, 1590; 1616)
- Collins, Roger (1989). The Arab Conquest of Spain 710-797. Oxford, UK / Cambridge, USA: Blackwell. ISBN 0-631-19405-3.
- Collins, Roger (1990). The Basques (2nd ed.). Oxford, UK: Basil Blackwell. ISBN 0-631-17565-2.
- Evans, G. R. (2012). The Roots of the Reformation: Tradition, Emergence and Rupture. InterVarsity Press.
- Favyn, Histoire de Navarre (Paris, 1612)
- Ferreras, La Historia de España (Madrid, 1700–27)
- Fortún Pérez de Ciriza, Luis Javier (1993). "El Reino de Pamplona y la Cristiandad Occidental". Historia Ilustrada de Navarra. Pamplona: Diario de Navarra. ISBN 84-604-7413-5.
- Galland, Memoires sur la Navarre (Paris, 1648)
- Jaurgain, La Vasconie (Pau, 1898)
- Jimeno Jurío, José María (2004). ¿Dónde fue la Batalla de "Roncesvalles"?. Pamplona: Pamiela. ISBN 84-7681-392-9.
- de Marca, Histoire de Béarn (Paris, 1640)
- Larrea, Juan José; Lorenzo, Jesús (2012). "Barbarians of Dâr al-Islâm: the Upper March of al-Andalus and the Western Pyrenees in the Eighth and Ninth Centuries". La Transgiordania Nei Secoli XII-XIII e le "frontiere" del Mediterraneo Medievale. Oxford: Archaeopress: 277–288. ISBN 978-1-4073-0978-1.
- Martín Duque, Ángel J. (1993). "Génesis del reino de Pamplona". Historia Ilustrada de Navarra. Pamplona: Diario de Navarra. ISBN 84-604-7413-5.
- Martín Duque, Ángel J. (2002). "Definición de espacios y fronteras en los reinos de Asturias-León". Los espacios de poder en la España medieval: XII Semana de Estudios Medievales, Nájera, del 30 de julio al 3 de agosto de 2011. Coord. J. I. de la Iglesia Duarte y J. L. Martín Rodríguez. pp. 315–339. ISBN 84-95747-24-3.
- Martínez Díez, Gonzalo (2005). El Condado de Castilla (711-1038): la historia frente a la leyenda (in Spanish). 2 volumes. Valladolid: Consejería de Cultura y Turismo. ISBN 84-9718-275-8.
- Martínez Díez, Gonzalo (2007). Sancho III el Mayor Rey de Pamplona, Rex Ibericus (in Spanish). Madrid: Marcial Pons Historia. ISBN 978-84-96467-47-7.
- Miranda García, Fermín (1993). "Del apogeo a la crisis". Historia Ilustrada de Navarra. Pamplona: Diario de Navarra. ISBN 84-604-7413-5.
- Monreal, Gregorio; Jimeno, Roldan (2012). Conquista e Incorporación de Navarra a Castilla. Pamplona-Iruña: Pamiela. ISBN 978-84-7681-736-0.
- Moret, Investigationes históricas del reino de Navarra (Pamplona, 1655)
- Oihenart, Notitia utriusque Vasconiae (Paris, 1656)
- Risco, La Vasconia en España Sagrada, XXXII (Madrid, 1779)
- Ruano Prieto, Anexión del Reino de Navarra en tiempo del Rey Católico (Madrid, 1899)
- Serrano Izco, Bixente; Leoné, Santiago (2006). Navarra: las tramas de la historia (in Spanish). Pamplona: Euskara Kultur Elkargoa. ISBN 84-932845-9-9. OCLC 827798316.
- Sorauren, Mikel. Historia de Navarra, el estado vasco. Pamiela, 1999. ISBN 84-7681-299-X
- Trask, Robert L. (1997). The History of Basque. New York: Routledge. ISBN 0-415-13116-2. OL 978463M.
- Urzainqui, Tomás; Olaizola, Juan Maria (1998). La Navarra marítima. Pamplona: Pamiela. ISBN 84-7681-293-0.
- Urzainqui, Tomas; Esarte, Pello; García Manzanal, Alberto; Sagredo, Iñaki; Sagredo, Iñaki; Sagredo, Iñaki; Del Castillo, Eneko; Monjo, Emilio; Ruiz de Pablos, Francisco; Guerra Viscarret, Pello; Lartiga, Halip; Lavin, Josu; Ercilla, Manuel (2013). La Conquista de Navarra y la Reforma Europea. Pamplona-Iruña: Pamiela. ISBN 978-84-7681-803-9.
- Yanguas y Miranda, José, Annales del reino de Navarra (5 vols., Pamplona, 1684–95; 12 vols., Tolosa, 1890–92)
- Yanguas y Miranda, José, Crónica de los reyes de Navarra (Pamplona, 1843)
- Yanguas y Miranda, José, Diccionario de las antigüedades de Nayanna (Pamplona, 1840–43)
- Yanguas y Miranda, José, Historia compendiada del reino de Navarra (S. Sebastián, 1832)
