= Diocese of Oca =

Diocese of Oca may refer to the following ecclesiastical jurisdictions :

- the former Diocese of Oca (Asia Minor) in present Asian Turkey, now a Latin Catholic titular see
- the former Diocese of Oca (Spain) (Curiate name; Spanish Oca, modern Villafranca Montes de Oca), now also a Latin Catholic titular see

== See also ==
- Oca (disambiguation) for secular namesakes
