= Aznar Galíndez =

Aznar Galíndez may refer to:

- Aznar Galíndez I (died 839), count of Aragon
- Aznar Galíndez II (died 893), count of Aragon
