= Galindo Aznárez I =

Galindo Aznárez I (died 867) was Count of Aragón from 844 to 867.

== Biography ==
Galindo was the son of Aznar Galíndez I (and his wife, a woman of unknown name), who had been Count of Aragón from 809 to 820, when a practical joke played by Galindo on his brother-in-law García Galíndez led the latter to enlist the support of the Kingdom of Pamplona in usurping the county.

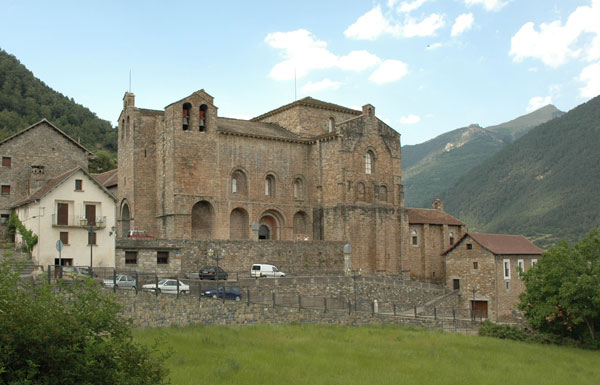
Abbey of San Pedro de Siresa

Aznar was compensated by Louis the Pious, King of West Francia, with the counties of Urgell, Cerdanya, and Conflent. Galindo received these counties from his father sometime before 833, in which year he usurped the counties of Pallars and Ribagorza. For this action he was dispossessed of Urgell and Cerdagne by Louis in 834, and was subsequently ejected from Pallars and Ribagorza by the Counts of Toulouse. Upon the heirless death in 844 of count Galindo Garcés, son of his father's rival, Galindo was allowed to assume the countship of Aragón in exchange for recognition of the suzerainty of Pamplona over the formerly-French county.

== Personal life ==
Galindo Aznárez and an unknown woman had a son, Aznar Galíndez II, his successor. He appears to have had at least one additional child: an 867 charter mentions a son-in-law, "king Sancho", whom several scholars have identified with the younger son of García Íñiguez of Pamplona, Sancho Garcés, father of Aznar Sánchez of Larraun and grandfather of queen Toda of Pamplona.

Count Galindo donated money to the Abbey of San Pedro de Siresa.

== Sources ==
| Preceded by Aznar Galíndez I | Count of Urgell; 824–834 | Succeeded by Sunifred I |
| Preceded by Aznar Galíndez I | Count of Cerdanya; 824–834 | Succeeded by Sunifred I |
| Preceded by Galindo Garcés | Count of Aragon; 844–867 | Succeeded by Aznar Galíndez II |
