= Aiza =

Name

Aiza is a name of Arabic and Basque origin. In Arabic, it means "prosperous" as well as "noble" is typically a variation of the name Aizah, also spelt Ayeza and related to the name Asya. This spelling in Basque is first attested in 1127 in Navarre, now in Spain. It is also an Etruscan word meaning “to venerate”.

== People ==
=== As first name ===
- Ayeza Khan, Pakistani actress

=== As surname ===
- King Íñigo Íñiguez (Basque, Eneko Enekones) called Arista in Spanish and Aiza or Aritza in Basque was the first king of Navarre, Spain. The House of Aritza (Aiza) was the ruling house of the Basque Kingdom of Navarra from 824 AD to 905 AD.
