= Court officials of the Kingdom of Navarre =

The court officials of the Kingdom of Navarre, five in number, were in charge of the smooth functioning of various aspects of the royal court at Pamplona. In the tenth and eleventh centuries these officials were often the youthful sons of the high nobility, for whom a period at court served as an education. Officials were often rotated, but rarely can their dates of appointment be determined precisely. Rather they are known from the official Latin titles by which they were known in royal charters, to which they often appeared as witnesses. While earlier officials tended to move on to inherit lordships and leave court, in the late eleventh century individuals appear in the same office for longer periods of time and may have been appointed for life.

The chronological lists below are not exhaustive, since there exist large gaps in the historical record. The Latin title connected to an office could vary. Instances where the same official bore a different title are noted, as are the dates of the atypical charters.

In 1362 the court officials of Charles II were the butler (botellero), herald (maestro de escudería), chamberlain (chambarlen), chamber clerk (clérigo de cámara), majordomo (maestre hostal), chaplains (capellanes), chef (maestro de cocina), forrero, escudero de la forrería, cup-bearer (chanzón del hostal), treasurer (cambradineros or tesorero), butcher (escudero trinchant), confessor (confesor), pages (pajes), equerry (paloafrenero mayor y guarda de los caballos mayores), and grooms (palafreneros). The office of constable (condestable, from connestable, originally comte d'estable) was brought over from France.

== Majordomo ==
The majordomo (Latin maior domus) was the chief officer of the court, who oversaw all the other officers. The office may have been held on a rotational basis, since several officials appear in and out of office. One majordomo held the post of butler simultaneously, as evidenced by a charter of 1072.

Name	First record in office	Final record in office	Title(s)
Gómez Auréliez	952	959	Maior domus
Gómez	992	992	Maior domus
García Sánchez	996	996	Maior domus
Lope Sánchez	1011	1024	Maior domus
Lope López	1015	1015	Maior domus
Gómez Sánchez	1018	1033	Maior domus
Álvaro Fortúnez	1040	1042	Maior domus
Galindo Iñíguez	1042	1042	Maior domus, Maior quoquorum
Fortún Velásquez	1047	1047	Maior domus
Jimeno Manciónez	1054	1060	Maior domus
Íñigo Sánchez	1056	1066	Maior domus
García Iñíguez	1063	1064	Maior domus
García Fortúnez	1071	1073	Maior domus
Lope Velásquez	1072	1076	Maior domus, also Botellarius
Velasco García	1078	1087	Maior domus

== Cup-bearer ==
The cup-bearer (Latin pincerna, architriclinus, or propinator) was the official in charge of keeping the royal court fed. Like the office of majordomo this one may have been rotational.

Name	First record in office	Final record in office	Title(s)
Fortún Jiménez	956	956	Pincerna
Sancho Fortúnez	997	997	Architriclinus
Aurelio Sánchez	1018	1031	Architriclinus
García Sánchez	1024	1024	Architriclinus
Galindo López	1040	1040	Pincerna
Íñigo López	1042	1042	Architriclinus
Fortún Iñíguez	1063	1066	Pincerna
Lope Iñíguez	1063	1063	Pincerna
Sancho Aznárez	1068	1072	Pincerna, Propinator (1072)
García Fortúnez	1071	1071	Pincerna

== Butler ==
The butler (Latin botellarius or botecarius) was the official in charge of the wine cellar, much like a modern wine steward. One butler held the post of majordomo simultaneously, as evidenced by a charter of 1072. There is no direct evidence in the charter record of rotation of this office, but several individuals appear to have been both butler and cup-bearer at different times.

Name	First record in office	Final record in office	Title(s)
Lope Iñíguez	1011	1020	Botellarius
Aznar Fortúnez	1015	1015	Botellarius
Sancho Jiménez	1033	1033	Botellarius
Jimeno Sánchez	1040	1040	Botellarius
Velasco García	1056	1064	Botellarius
Lope Muñoz	1066	1072	Botellarius
Lope Velásquez	1072	1072	Botellarius, Botecarius, also Maior domus
Sancho Sánchez	1078	1087	Botellarius

== Armour-Bearer ==
The armour-bearer (Latin armiger or armentarius) was in charge of the royal armoury and possibly also the king's guard. The connection with weaponry is visible in the list of synonyms for this term, all of which contain the Latin root fer-, signifying iron: alferiz, fertorarius, inferartis, and offertor. This office changed hands with higher frequency than the others, and there is also evidence of rotation. It is the only office for which two officers are cited in the same charter: Fortún Jiménez and Ortí Ortiz were both inferartes in a charter of 1043.

Name	First record in office	Final record in office	Title(s)
Fortún Jiménez	959	959	Armiger
Galindo Gómez	1030	1030	Armentarius
Fortún Jiménez	1043	1043	Inferartis
Ortí Ortiz	1043	1043	Inferartis
Galindo López	1044	1044	Offertor
Lope García	1058	1058	Alferiz
Lope García	1060	1060	Armiger
Jimeno García	1062	1064	Armiger
Fortún Iñíguez	1063	1063	Fertorarius
Lope Iñíguez	1063	1064	Fertorarius
Fortún Iñíguez	1063	1063	Fertorarius
García Fortúnez	1065	1071	Offertor, Fertorarius (1068), Tallator (1068–69)
Pedro García	1066	1072	Armiger
Lope Iñíguez	1066	1066	Offertor
Íñigo Sánchez	1072	1072	Alferiz
Fortún Iñíguez	1072	1087	Armiger
Íñigo Sánchez	1072	1076	Armiger
Sancho García	1072	1075	Offertor

== Marshal ==
The marshal (Latin stabularius) had charge of the royal stables. While there is no direct evidence of rotation in this office, no individual held it for more than three years.

Name	First record in office	Final record in office	Title(s)
García Auréliez	957	959	Stabularius
Fortún Jiménez	992	992	Stabularius
Lope Iñíguez	996	996	Stabularius
García Sánchez	997	997	Stabularius
Jimeno Fortúnez	1020	1020	Stabularius
Sancho Datiz	1042	1043	Stabularius
García García	1058	1062	Stabularius
García Sánchez	1063	1064	Stabularius
Fortún Álvarez	1066	1066	Stabularius
Lope Sánchez	1068	1070	Stabularius
Lope Vélaz	1071	1072	Stabularius
García Fortúnez	1072	1072	Stabularius
Lope Iñíguez	1072	1075	Stabularius
Sancho García	1087	1090	Stabularius
