= García Galíndez =

García Galíndez (died 833), called the Bad (el Malo), was the Count of Aragon and Conflent from 820.

The son of Galindo Belascotenes, García had married Matrona, daughter of Aznar Galíndez I, Count of Aragon. However, according to tradition he took offense at a prank played on him by his brothers-in-law, Centule and Galindo, who locked him in a house during the Midsummer. In retaliation, he murdered Centule and repudiated Matrona, allying himself with Íñigo Arista of Pamplona, whose daughter he then married. His role in these events led to his traditional nickname, 'the Bad'.

In 820, Íñigo gathered a small army and deposed the Frankish vassal Aznar, making García count of Aragon and Conflent. In 824, when Aeblus and Aznar Sánchez marched on Pamplona, García and Musa ibn Fortún of the Banu Qasi probably lent their support to the Basque Íñigo, leading to the defeat of the Frankish counts.

Depending on the source, he either died or retired from government in 833, being succeeded by his son Galindo Garcés.

== Sources ==
- Collins, Roger. The Basques. Blackwell Publishing: London, 1990.
- Higounet, Charles. Bordeaux pendant le haut moyen age. Bordeaux, 1963.
- Lewis, Archibald R. The Development of Southern French and Catalan Society, 718–1050. University of Texas Press: Austin, 1965.

Preceded by Aznar Galíndez I	Count of Aragon; 820–833	Succeeded by Galindo Garcés
Preceded by Aznar Galíndez I	Count of Conflent; 820–833	Succeeded by Galindo Garcés
