= Íñigo Arista =

Basque military leader, first king of Pamplona

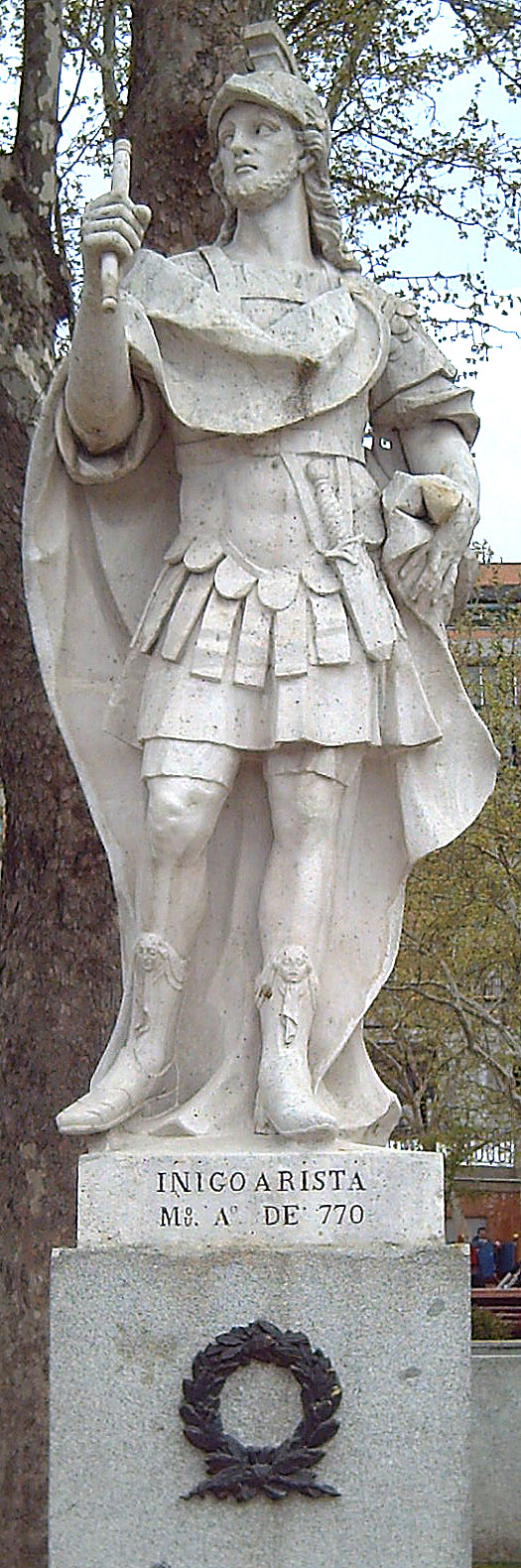
- Statue of Íñigo by José Oñate in Madrid, c. 1750–1753

King of Pamplona
- Reign: 816–851
- Predecessor: Velasco the Basque
- Successor: García Íñiguez of Pamplona
- Born: Enneco Ennecois c. 771–790; County of Bigorre
- Died: c. 852 (aged 62-81); Isaba, Kingdom of Pamplona
- Consort: Onneca Velázquez
- Issue: Assona Íñiguez, García Íñiguez, Galindo Íñiguez, Nunilona? Íñiguez
- House: House of Íñiguez
- Father: Íñigo Jiménez
- Mother: Onneca of Pamplona

Íñigo Arista (Basque: Eneko; Arabic: ونّقه, romanized: Wannaquh; c. 771–790 – 851 or 852) was a Basque chieftain and the first king of Pamplona. He is thought to have risen to prominence after the defeat of local Frankish partisans at the Battle of Pancorbo in 816, and his rule is usually dated from shortly after the defeat of a Carolingian army in 824.

He is first attested by chroniclers as a rebel against the Emirate of Córdoba from 840 until his death a decade later. Remembered as the nation's founder, he would be referred to as early as the 10th century by the nickname "Arista", coming either from Basque Aritza (Haritza/Aiza, literally 'the oak', meaning 'the resilient') or Latin Aresta ('the considerable').

== Origin ==
The origin of Íñigo Arista is obscure. There is even disagreement regarding the name of his father. A charter preserved at Leyre describes him as Enneco ... filius Simeonis (Íñigo son of Jimeno) and another Leyre document reports the obituary of Enneco Garceanes, que fuit vulgariter vocas Areista (Íñigo Garcés [son of García], who is commonly called Arista). Many later historians have followed one or the other of these, but the reliability of either is questioned due to the possibility of later corruption or forgery.

Eleventh-century chroniclers Ibn Hayyan, who calls him and his brother ibn Wannaqo (Arabic: بن ونّقه, Íñiguez) al-Bascunis, and Al-Udri, calling him ibn Yannaqo, both thus indicate that his father was likewise named Íñigo. He is said by Rodrigo Jiménez de Rada (c. 1170–1247) to have been Count of Bigorre, or at least to have come from there, but there is no near-contemporary evidence of this.

It has been speculated that he was kin to García Jiménez, who in the late 8th century succeeded his father Jimeno the Strong in resisting Carolingian expansion into Vasconia. A second dynasty of Pamplona monarchs that would supplant his, the Jimena, is usually made to be related to him.

The name of Íñigo's mother is unknown (she is sometimes called Onneca, without foundation) but it is known that she also married local muwallad lord Musa ibn Fortun al-Qasawi, by him having a son Musa ibn Musa al-Qasawi. (Note: Íñigo and Fortún Íñiguez are explicitly called brothers of Musa ibn Musa on their mother's side by chroniclers Ibn Hayyan and Al-Udri. The order of the maternal marriages has been subject to speculation, with Lévi-Provençal and Pérez de Urbel having the widowed mother of Íñigo marrying Musà ibn Fortún, while Sánchez Albornoz ("Problemas") argued that the Christian marriage came after the Muslim.) This younger Musa would become head of the Banu Qasi, ruler of Tudela and one of the chief lords of Ebro Valley. Due to this relationship, Íñigo and his kin frequently acted in alliance with Musa ibn Musa, a relationship that allowed Íñigo to extend his influence over large territories in the Pyrenean valleys, and was also instrumental in the rebellions that would lead to Pamplona breaking with the Emirate.

== Rise to power ==
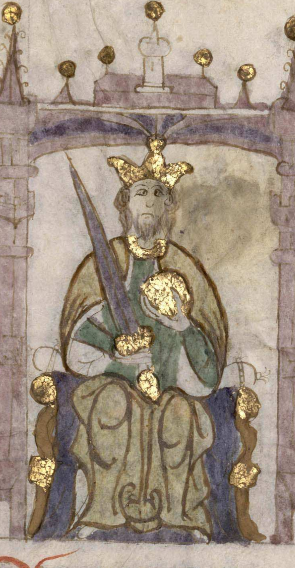
Depiction of Iñigo in the Castilian manuscript Compendium of Chronicles of Kings, c. 1312–1325

The family came to power through struggles over Frankish and Córdoban influence in northern Iberia. In 799, pro-Frankish assassins murdered Mutarrif ibn Musa, governor of Pamplona, probably kinsman of Musa ibn Musa al-Qasawi. Ibn Hayyan reports that in 816, Abd al-Karim ibn Abd al-Wahid ibn Mugit launched a military campaign against the pro-Frankish "Enemy of God", Velasco the Gascon (Arabic: بلشك الجلشقي, Balašk al-Ŷalašqī), Sahib of Pamplona (Arabic: صاحب بنبلونة), who had united Christian and pagan factions. They fought a three-day battle in which the pro-Córdoba faction routed their enemies and killed Velasco, along with García López, kinsman of Alfonso II of Asturias, Sancho "warrior/knight of Pamplona", and pagan warrior "Ṣaltān". This defeat of the pro-Frankish force appears to have allowed the anti-Frankish Íñigo to come to power.

In 820, Íñigo is said to have intervened in the County of Aragon, ejecting a Frankish vassal, count Aznar I Galíndez, in favor of García Galíndez, who became Íñigo's son-in-law. In 824, a Carolingian force led by counts Aeblus and Aznar Sánchez made an expedition against Pamplona, but were defeated in the second battle of Roncesvalles.

Traditionally, this battle is portrayed as resulting in the crowning of Íñigo as king of Pamplona, but there is no direct evidence of his involvement in the battle or his crowning thereafter, and he is referred to by Arab chroniclers with the same title as given Velasco, "lord of Pamplona". His realm continually played Muslims and Christians against themselves and each other to maintain independence against the outside powers.

== Rebellion and death ==
In 840 Íñigo's lands were attacked by Abd Allah ibn Kulayb, wali of Zaragoza, leading his half-brother, Musa ibn Musa, into rebellion. Íñigo's son García acted as regent, in concert with Íñigo's warrior brother Fortún Íñiguez (Arabic: فرتون بن ونّقه, Fortūn ibn Wannaqo), who was also half-brother of Musa, and they joined Musa in an uprising against the Emirate of Córdoba. Abd-ar-Rahman II, emir of Córdoba, launched reprisal campaigns in the succeeding years.

In an 843 battle, Fortún Íñiguez was killed, and Musa unhorsed and forced to escape on foot, while Íñigo and his son Galindo escaped with wounds--and several noblemen, most notably Velasco Garcés, defected to Abd-ar-Rahman. The subsequent year, Íñigo's own son, Galindo Íñiguez, and Musa's son Lubb ibn Musa went over to Córdoba, and Musa was forced to submit. Following a brief campaign in 845, a general peace was achieved. In 850, Mūsā again rose in open rebellion, supported by Pamplona, and envoys of Induo (thought to be Íñigo) and Mitio, (Note: Identified by Pérez de Urbel with Jimeno of Pamplona, but Sánchez Albornoz rejects this.) "Dukes of the Navarrese", were received at the French court.

Íñigo died in the Muslim year 237 A.H., which is late 851 or early 852, and was succeeded by his son García Íñiguez who was already governing the kingdom during his father's long illness prior to his death. (Note: Lévi-Provençal and García Gómez; Sánchez Albornoz ("Problemas"). It has been suggested that either Jimeno of Pamplona or his son García Jiménez served as regent following the death of Íñigo, but as the chroniclers of Al-Andalus show García Íñiguez already taking a leadership role before his father's death, this is unlikely.)

== Leyre, major monastery of Navarre ==
During the lifetime of Íñigo, the existence of several monasteries is attested across Navarre, when the Cordovan priest Eulogius had to stay in the area (848). In a letter written to Wiliesind, not only does Eulogius reveal that the Basque leader was a christicola princeps but he provides the names of three monasteries not far from Pamplona: Siresa, St. Zacharias and Leyre.

The iconic monastery of Leyre, founded in the 9th century and claimed later to be founded by the king of Pamplona, was fostered by granting lands and estates to it. A document in the archives of the monastery shows that in 842, Íñigo bestowed the town and lands of Yesa on Leyre ("Ego rex Eneco concedo..."), although the authenticity of the document recording this grant is disputed. Íñigo himself is reported to have been buried in the monastery after his death in 851/852.

== Lineage and family links ==
The name of the wife (or wives) of Íñigo is not reported in contemporary records, although sources from centuries later assign her the name of Toda or Onneca. There is also scholarly debate regarding her derivation, some hypothesizing that she was daughter of Velasco, lord of Pamplona (killed 816), and others making her kinswoman of Aznar I Galíndez. (Note: Mello Vaz de São Payo; Stasser. These identifications are based on the names given in subsequent generations, but Sánchez Albornoz ("Problemas") wrote of the danger of assuming that such name usage demonstrates specific familial linkage.) He was father of the following known children:

- Assona Íñiguez, who married her father's half-brother, Musa ibn Musa al-Qasawi, lord of Tudela and Huesca
- García Íñiguez, regent and then Íñigo's successor as 'king'.
- Galindo Íñiguez, fled to Córdoba where he was friend of Eulogius of Córdoba. Musa ibn Galind, Amil of Huesca in 860, assassinated in 870, was apparently his son.
- A daughter (Nunilona?), who married Count García el Malo (the Bad) of Aragón.

== Historical Legacy ==
The dynasty founded by Íñigo reigned for about 80 years, being supplanted by a rival dynasty in 905. However, due to intermarriages, subsequent kings of Navarre descended from Íñigo, and some accounts even wrongly showed them to descend from Íñigo in the direct male line. He is remembered as the founder of the nation of Navarre.

== Sources ==
- Barrau-Dihigo, Lucien (1900). "Les origines du royaume de Navarre d'apres une théorie récente". Revue Hispanique (in French). 7 (21–22): 141–222. ISSN 9965-0355.
- Caro Baroja, Julio (1978). Sondeos históricos (in Spanish). San Sebastián: Txertoa. ISBN 9788471480385.
- Collins, Roger (1990). The Basques (2nd ed.). Oxford, UK: Basil Blackwell. ISBN 0631175652.
- García Gómez, Emilio; Lévi-Provençal, Évariste (1954). "Textos inéditos del Muqtabis de Ibn Hayyan sobre los orígines del Reino de Pamplona". Al-Andalus (in Spanish). 19 (2): 295–316. ISSN 0304-4335.
- Granja, Fernando de la (1967). "La Marca Superior en la obra de Al-'Udri" (PDF). Estudios de Edad Media de la Corona de Aragón. 8: 447–545. OCLC 694519776.
- Lacarra de Miguel, José María (1945). "Textos navarros del Códice de Roda" (PDF). Estudios de Edad Media de la Corona de Aragón. 1: 193–284. OCLC 694519776.
- Lévi-Provençal, Évariste (1953). "Du nouveau sur le royaume de Pampelune au IXe siècle". Bulletin Hispanique (in French). 55 (1). Université de Bordeaux: 5–22. doi:10.3406/hispa.1953.3340. ISSN 0007-4640.
- Martínez Díez, Gonzalo (2007). Sancho III el Mayor Rey de Pamplona, Rex Ibericus (in Spanish). Madrid: Marcial Pons Historia. ISBN 978-84-96467-47-7.
- Pérez de Urbel, Justo (1954). "Lo viejo y lo nuevo sobre el origin del Reino de Pamplona". Al-Andalus (in Spanish). 19 (1): 1–42. ISSN 0304-4335.
- Sánchez Albornoz, Claudio (1958). "La epístola de S. Eulogio y el Muqtabis de Ibn Hayan" (PDF). Príncipe de Viana (in Spanish). 19 (72–73): 265–266. ISSN 0032-8472.
- Sánchez Albornoz, Claudio (1959). "Problemas de la historia Navarra del siglo IX" (PDF). Príncipe de Viana (in Spanish) (20): 5–62. ISSN 0032-8472.
- Settipani, Christian (2004). La Noblesse du Midi Carolingien (in French). Oxford: Unit for Prosopographical Research. ISBN 9781900934046.
- Stasser, Thierry (1999). "Consanguinity et Alliances Dynastiques en Espagne au Haut Moyen Age: La Politique Matrimoniale de la Reinne Tota de Navarre". Hidalguía: La revista de Genealogía, Nobleza y Armas (in French). Madrid: Instituto Salazar y Castro: 811–839. ISSN 0018-1285.

New title	King of Pamplona; 824–851/2	Succeeded by García Íñiguez
