= Abbey of San Pedro de Siresa =

Coordinates: 42°45′19″N 0°45′17″W

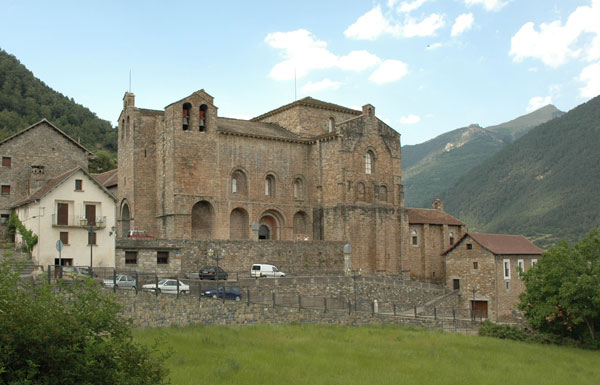

The Abbey of San Pedro de Siresa (Aragonese: Monesterio de Sant Per de Ciresa, Spanish: Monasterio de San Pedro de Siresa) is a monastery in the Valle de Hecho, (Aragon, Spain). It was constructed between the 9th and 13th centuries, and is the northernmost monastery in Aragon.

== History ==
Buildings have existed at this site for centuries, possibly back to Visigothic times according to the excavations conducted in 1991. A Roman road (ruins of which remain today) passed nearby, connecting Zaragoza and Berdún (in the municipality of Canal de Berdún) to Béarn (France), through the 1,970 meter pass at Puerto de Palo.

In 833, Galindo Garcés (Count of Aragon between 833 and 844) and his wife Guldegrut made donations to build a monastery here. Zechariah became the first abbot, and organized the monastery in accordance with the rules set in 816 in a synod held in Aachen, inspired by the rule of Metz Crodegando.

In 852, the traveling monk and scholar Eulogius of Córdoba wrote Guilesino of Pamplona about the splendor of the monastery and its library. Eulogius found and copied Greco-Roman manuscripts there which had been lost in his home Caliphate of Cordoba, including an Aeneid, Latin poetry of Horace and Juvenal, fables by Aviano and The City of God by Augustine of Hippo.

A donation completed in 864 granted the monastery all the valley lands between Javierregay (now the town of Puente la Reina de Jaca) to the site of Water Eye, in the Pyrenees, which includes the Subordán Aragon river, today in the municipality of Anso. In the year of his death Galindo Aznárez I (Galindo Garcés' successor, Count of Aragon between 844 and 867) gave the monastery the town of Hecho, head of the valley, as well as dozens of vineyards, cultivated fields and the town of Surba.

The monastery also benefited from the restoration of the ancient episcopal see of Huesca, which had disappeared for a long time. Tenth century grants and confirmations of property document the monastery's importance and use of income to acquire new lands.

According to Fernando Romanos, the first reference to the Hecho Aragonese dialect is from a 13th-century inventory at the Siresa church.

== The structure ==
None of the original Carolingian or Reconquista monastery's buildings remain. Only the church, probably rebuilt in 1083, during the height of the monastery's power and wealth, survives. The old Carolingian abbey was reformed in that year, and construction resumed in the middle years of the following century, but eventually petered out.

The large building has cruciform design (in the form of a Latin cross). A crypt lies under the single semicircular apse; the outside is polygonal. Pre-Roman remains exist at the base of the nave. The front door and facade form a massive structure, the exterior of which features a pair of arches, and a small bell. The tympanum of the door displays a Chi Rho.

The transept has a hemispherical dome, which collapsed after a fire; the central part of the transept dome was replaced by a groin vault and the laterals by a barrel vault. The apse has three openings, topped by blind arches in the interior and exterior walls, decorated by cordons.

Restoration work was performed during the thirteenth century, but the resulting architectural additions are of a visibly lower quality.

The church still retains part of its decoration, among which is a depiction of Christ Descending, possibly of twelfth-century design, a thirteenth-century Virgen and a Gothic Altarpiece dedicated to St. John the Evangelist, the Trinity, Saint Stephen and Saint John. It is noteworthy that, contrary to uses of the area and period, there is no sculpture in the building, thus presenting an aspect of total sobriety. Almost the only decorative element present in its facade is the Chi Rho.

The church was declared a National Monument in 1931, and since then several restoration campaigns have been undertaken. Today, the church serves as the core Siresa parish church.

== Legends ==
According to legend, the Holy Grail was once found in a crevice in the wall of this church. However, similar legends exist about several other churches in this remote and once war-torn area.

== External Web Sites ==
1. Siresa description, with various descriptions, photographs and plans
2. Careful Description, with photographs
3. Detailed description, with photographs
4. Web site of Garcia Omedes, with description and photographs
