= Asya Yeutykh =

Goldsmith and bladesmith

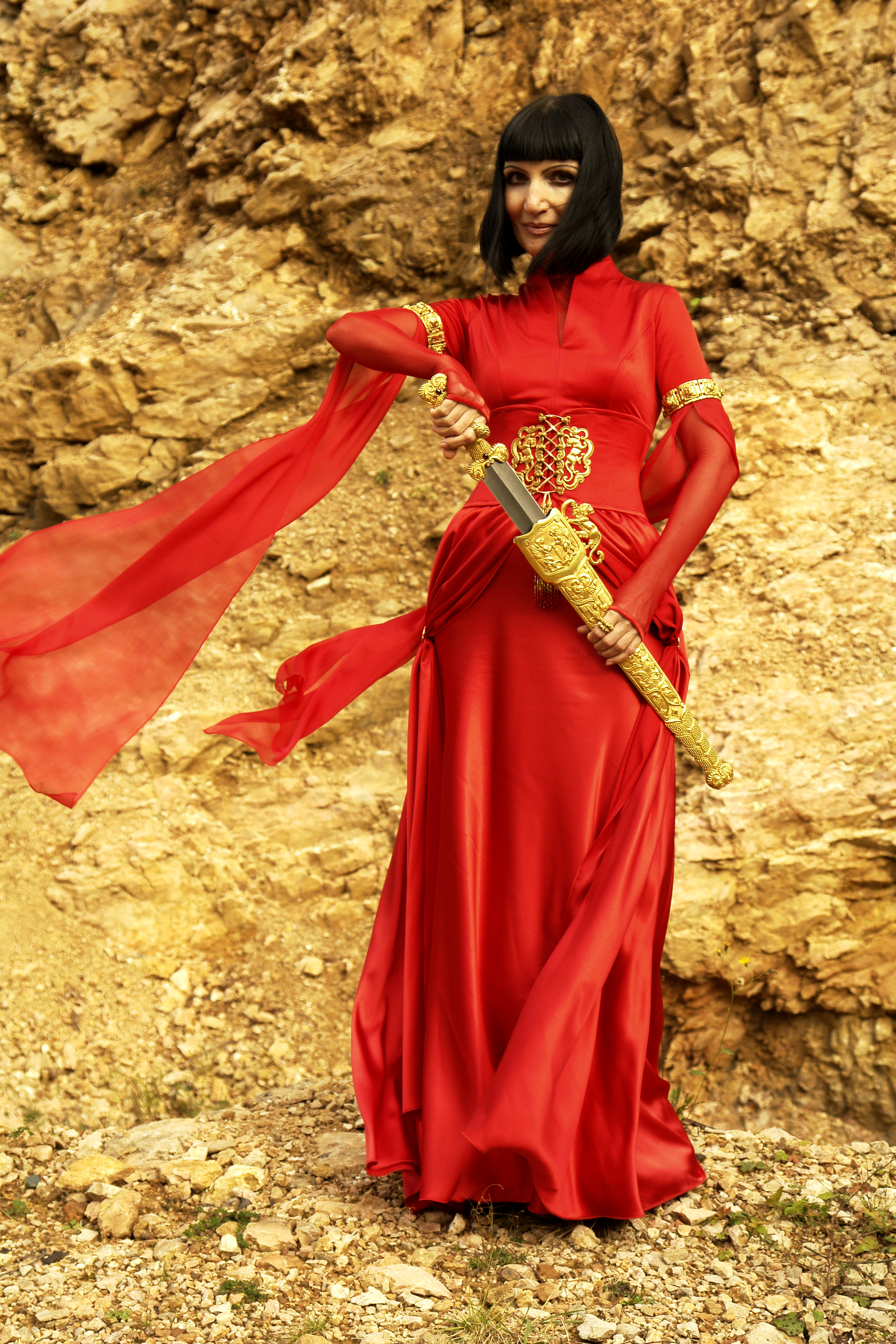
- Born: December 8, 1962 (age 63)
- Citizenship: North Caucasia
- Education: Kuban State University
- Occupations: Goldsmith; bladesmith
- Website: https://asyaeutykh.ru/

Asya Yeutykh (Adyghe: Еутых Ася Аслъан и пхъу, Yevtıh Asya Asl'an yi pxhu; Russian: Ася Аслановна Еутых, also transcribed Asja Aslanowna Jeutych; born 8 December 1962) is a goldsmith and bladesmith from the Republic of Adygea. Her work is held in public and private collections, including those of Vladimir Putin and the Hermitage Museum.

== Biography ==
Yeutykh was born on 8 December 1962 in Sovetskaya, a village in the Kuban region. Her grandfather, whom she never met, was also a goldsmith and the hereditary trade of the family is in high-status metal-working. Her grandmother passed family secrets on to Yeutykh. She attended Maykop City School No. 8 and then subsequently began a degree in Fine Art at the Karachay-Cherkessia State Technological Academy. She then transferred to Kuban State University to study art and graphic design. She is married to Ruslan Turkav. They have two sons.

The archaeology and heritage of Adygea is an inspiration for much of Yeutykh's work, in particular Hittite culture, Scythian art, as well as the cultural heritage of her home. She is perhaps best known for her acinaces (swords), which are originally Scythian in origin. She also re-invented a historic alloy, which she named Juvelus, which consists of tin, copper, silver and gold; it is supposedly based on an ancient recipe. Her work is carried out using casting, engraving and gilding techniques and she makes many of her own tools. Inspired by the rich heritage and archaeology of Adygea, each new year she crafts a new figurine inspired by Adygean cultural traditions; it 2016 she forged a likeness of Bigfoot, or Mezil as it is known there. Another significant work is The Wishes Tree, which is based on Circassian folklore.

In 1998 she created the equipment and the weapon for the Jordanian prince and his private Circassian royal guard. This project commemorated the exodus of Adyghe people in the late nineteenth century. In 2007 over 600 of her works were shown at the Hermitage Museum, as part of an exhibition celebrating the 450th anniversary of Adygea and Kabardino-Balkaria becoming part of the Russian State. The exhibition was curated by Yu Yu Piotrovsky. In 2015, a retrospective of her work was held in Krasnodar, which was entitled Asya Yeutykh: 5000 Years. The show included 330 of her works, including a two metre high Scythian throne, rhytons, daggers, golden cups and jewellery. In 2013, the totem for that year was a snake. As of 2021, work was ongoing on a new centre for Yeutykh's work, consisting of an exhibition hall, workshops and studios, known as the Golden Storeroom. It is intended to become a global centre for fine metalworking.

== Awards and recognition ==
Yeutykh is a member of the Russian Academy of Arts. She is a member of the Association of Artists of Russia and People's Artists of the Adygea Republic.

== Collections and exhibitions ==
=== Public collections ===
Yeutykh's work is highly collectible and can be found in public collections, including:

- Rhyton (2000), Hermitage Museum.

=== Private collections ===
Yeutykh's work is highly collectible and can be found in private collections, including:

- Vladimir Putin: rhytons.
- Hosni Mubarak.
- Prince Ali bin Hussein: sabres, daggers, belts for his Circassian Guard (1998).
- Princess Rym al-Ali: jewellery set her wedding to Prince Ali bin Hussein (2004).
- Yuri Temirkanov: conductor's baton (2003).

=== Exhibitions ===
- In the Mirror of Traditions, Hermitage Museum (2007).
- Asya Yeutykh: 5000 Years (2015).

== Publications ==
- В зеркале традиций. Произведения ювелира Аси Еутых. (Hermitage Museum, 2012).
