= Velasco the Basque =

9th-century Basque leader

Velasco the Basque (Arabic: بلشك الجلشقي, Balask al-Galaski) was the Basque ruler of Pamplona in the early 9th century.

Velasco may have come to power in 799 in the uprising that overthrew the Umayyad rule in Pamplona, when Muṭarrif ibn Mūsa, probably of the Banu Qasi, was assassinated there.

The contemporary Annales Regni Francorum record that "the Navarri and the Pamplonans, who had defected to the Saracens in recent years, were received back into allegiance" in 806. Velasco must be seen as a pro-Frankish leader, perhaps even a Frankish appointee.

According to the 11th-century Muqtabis of Ibn Ḥayyān, in the year 816 (AH 200) the Córdoban ḥājib ʿAbd al-Karīm led an expedition against Velasco, whom he describes as the "lord of Pamplona" (Arabic: صاحب بنبلونة, ṣāḥib) and the "enemy of God". There is no record of Velasco receiving any assistance from his Frankish allies. In fact, the Umayyad governor of Zaragoza, the future ʿAbd al-Raḥmān II, even sent an embassy to the Frankish emperor Louis the Pious that year, perhaps to forestall just such a Frankish reaction.

Velasco did receive assistance from the neighbouring Kingdom of Asturias. The Asturian contingent included some Basques from the region of Álava. After thirteen days of fighting "without truce" along the river Arum, Velasco was defeated and the Álavan leader, García López (Garsiya ibn Lubb), was killed. This García was a cousin of King Alfonso II of Asturias, who was himself half-Basque. The "best knight of Pamplona", Sancho, and a certain Ṣaltān, leader of the majūs (idolaters), were also among those killed. Following their defeat, the Basques blocked the rivers and mountain passes, frustrating any further Umayyad advance. Ṣaltān was probably the leader of a faction of pagan Basques.

Nothing is heard of Velasco after his defeat in 816, but he was no longer lord of Pamplona by 824, when Íñigo Arista was ruling there.
