= Asya Alashaikh =

Saudi businesswoman

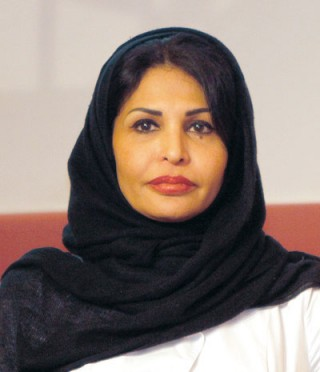

Asya Alashaikh (Arabic: آسيا ال الشيخ; born 6 February) is a Saudi businesswoman and social entrepreneur. She is the founder and CEO of Tamkeen Company for sustainable solutions in the Kingdom of Saudi Arabia.

Alashaikh was born in Riyadh, on 6 February to Abdullah Bin Abdul Rahman Alashaikh, who served as director of security, and Nora Hassan Alashaikh. She has five sisters and a brother.

She worked as a part-time consultant at the Shura Council from 2008 to 2012. She currently serves as the vice president of the National Consultants at the Council of Saudi Chambers and a member of the CSR Committee at the Jeddah Chamber of Commerce.

Currently she is working on a national project of corporate social responsibility under the title of "Integration" launched by the Council of Saudi Chambers in partnership with the Ministry of Trade and Industry. This project aims to develop a national framework for corporate social responsibility.

== Education ==
Alashaikh attended Al-Abna’a Secondary School in Riyadh, and then King Saud University, where she graduated with BA in English literature in 1988. She received her master's degree in political science and administration from the University of Massachusetts, Amherst in early 2000s.
