= Diocese of Oca (Spain) =

Former Roman Catholic diocese in Spain

Coordinates: 42.3882°N 3.3090°W

Map of Spain under the Visigoths, showing the location of Auca (Oca)

Oca (Latin Auca) is a former bishopric in the province of Burgos, Castile and León region (northern Spain), the predecessor of the Roman Catholic Archdiocese of Burgos, and presently a Latin titular see of the Catholic Church. Its Latin adjective is Aucen(sis).

== Visigothic see ==
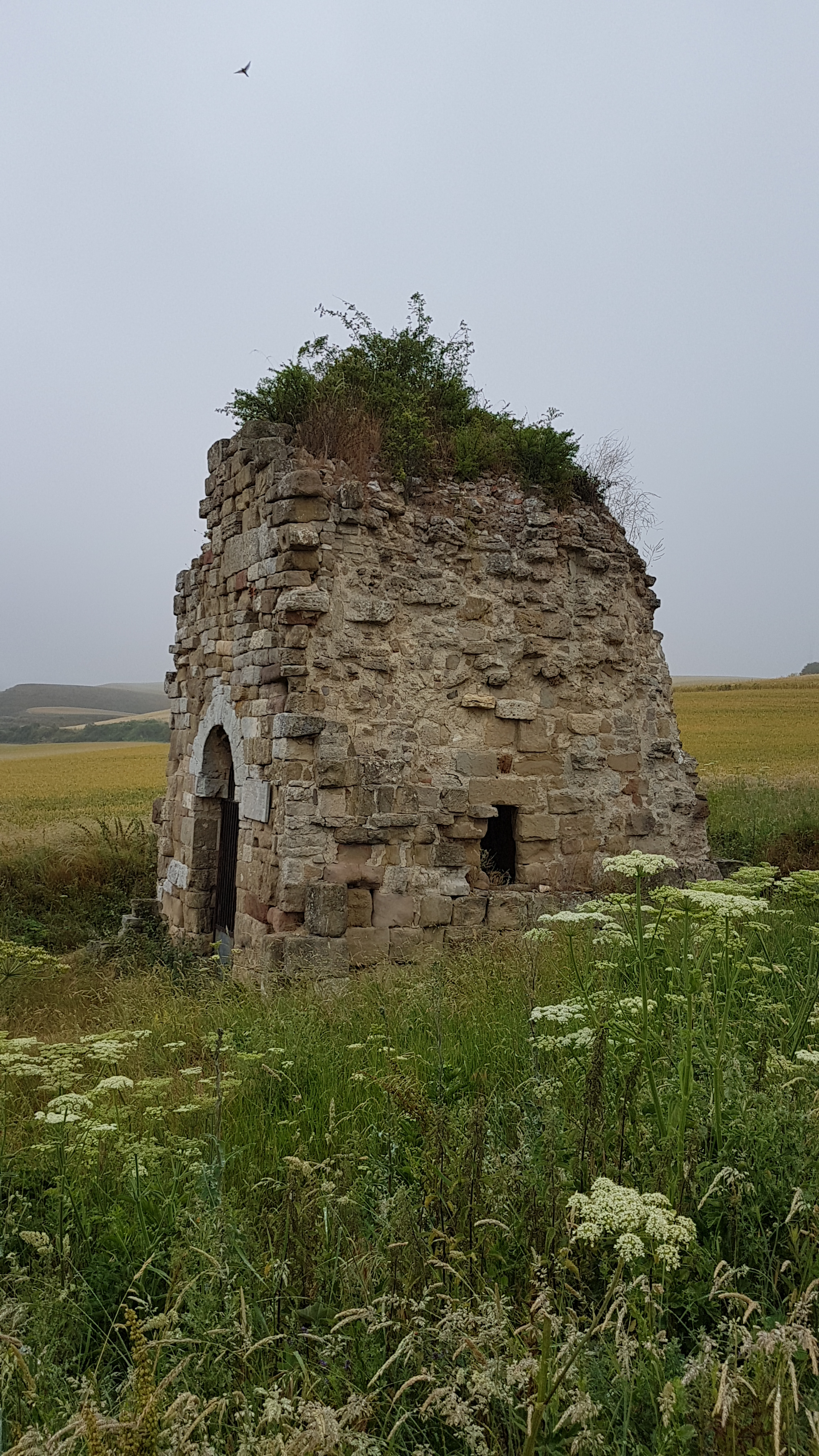
Ruined hermitage of San Felices, where, according to tradition, Diego Porcelos is buried

The diocese was established at Oca, now Villafranca Montes de Oca, no later than 589, when its bishop Asterius attended the Third Council of Toledo, but vaguer notices may trace it back as early as the 3rd century. Monastic life flourished there during the Visigothic Kingdom of Toledo (6th–8th century).

However, in the 8th century, Arab Muslim invaders destroyed Oca, rendering its bishops errant, quoted by sources at Amaya, Valpuesta, Muñó, Sasamón, Oña, Gamonal, only to have their 'see' formally suppressed to restore definitively the Diocese of Burgos in 1075, confirmed by Pope Urban II in 1095.

=== Suffragan Bishops of Oca ===
1. Asterius (fl. 589–597)
2. Amanungus (fl. 633–646)
3. Litorius (fl. 649–656)
4. Stercorius (fl. 675–688)
5. Constantine (fl. 693).

== Titular see ==
The diocese was nominally restored in 1969 as the titular bishopric of Auca (Curiate Latin and Italian).

It has had the following incumbents, so far of the fitting Episcopal (lowest) rank:

1. Daniel Llorente y Federico, 11 December 1969 – death 27 February 1971, bishop emeritus of Segovia (Spain) (1944.12.09 – 1969.12.11), previously Titular Bishop of Daphnusia (1942.03.12 – 1944.12.09) as Auxiliary Bishop of Burgos (Spain) (1942.03.12 – 1944.12.09)
2. Hernando Rojas Ramirez, Coadjutor bishop of Espinal (Colombia), 26 April 1972 – 12 December 1974; later succeeded as Bishop of Espinal (1974.12.12 – 1985.07.01), next Bishop of Neiva (Colombia) (1985.07.01 – 2001.01.19), died 2002
3. Theodor Hubrich, as auxiliary bishop in the diocese of Magdeburg (eastern Germany), 5 December 1975 – resigned 26 March 1992; later Apostolic Administrator of Schwerin (eastern Germany) (1987.11.23 – death 1992.03.26)
4. Jorge Mario Bergoglio, S.J. as auxiliary bishop of Buenos Aires (Argentina), 20 May 1992 – 3 June 1997; later Coadjutor Archbishop of Buenos Aires (1997.06.03 – 1998.02.28), succeeding as Metropolitan Archbishop of Buenos Aires (1998.02.28 – 2013.03.13), also Ordinary of Argentina of the Eastern Rite (1998.11.06 – 2013.03.13), created Cardinal-Priest of S. Roberto Bellarmino (2001.02.21 [2001.10.14] – 2013.03.13), President of Episcopal Conference of Argentina (2005.11.08 – 2011.11.08), elected Supreme Pontiff Pope Francis (2013.03.13 [2013.03.19] – 2025.04.21)
5. Mieczysław Cisło (13 December 1997 – ...), as auxiliary bishop of Lublin (Poland), no previous prelature.

== See also ==
- List of Catholic dioceses in Spain, Andorra, Ceuta and Gibraltar

== Sources and external links ==
- Website of the (successor) archdiocese of Burgos (in Spanish)
- GCatholic - titular see of Auca (Oca), with Google satellite photo - data for all sections
- "Auca". Catholic-Hierarchy.org. David M. Cheney.
