= Aeblus =

Frankish count

Aeblus, Ebalus, or Ebles was a Frankish count in Gascony early in the ninth century.

With Aznar Sánchez, he led a large expedition across the Pyrenees to re-establish control over Navarre. After accomplishing their goals and entering Pamplona with no resistance, they were defeated on the way back at the so-called "Second Battle of Roncesvalles." Both he and Aznar were captured, but while Aznar (a Basque) was released on account of his kinship with the captor leaders, Aeblus (a Frank) was sent prisoner to the Emir of Córdoba, dying thereafter in captivity.

== Sources ==
- Astronomus. Vita Hludovici imperatoris, ed. G. Pertz, ch. 2, in Mon. Gen. Hist. Scriptores, II, 608.
- Einhard. Vita Karoli Magni. Translated by Samuel Epes Turner. New York: Harper and Brothers, 1880.
- Codera y Zaidín, F. "Expedición a Pamplona de los condes francos Elbo y Aznar," Colección de Estudios Árabes. VII, 185 – 199.
- Collins, Roger. The Basques. Blackwell Publishing: London, 1990.
- Lewis, Archibald R. The Development of Southern French and Catalan Society, 718–1050. University of Texas Press: Austin, 1965.
