= Aznar Galíndez I =

Basque count (died 839)

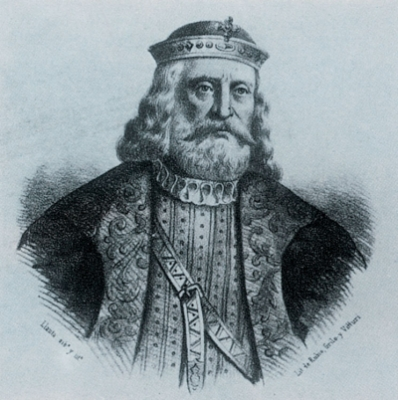
Aznar Galíndez I

Aznar Galíndez I or Asnar Galí I (died 839) was a Basque count of Aragon and Conflent from 809 and Cerdanya and Urgell from 820. Aznar has been confused with Aznar Sánchez, Duke of Gascony, and some authorities have even considered the two like-named contemporaries to be one and the same person.

Aznar succeeded Aureolus as count of the valley of the River Aragón on the latter's death in 809. Some sources indicate him as count of Jaca, which was probably the seat of his authority within the valley. He was installed by king Louis the Pious (a son of emperor Charlemagne), and remained a Frankish vassal. In 820, he was overthrown by his son-in-law García the Bad, supported by Íñigo Arista's Navarrese forces.

He took refuge in the Vasconia that remained suzerain to the Franks, and was appointed count in Urgell and Cerdanya.

He had four children:

- Matrona, who married García the Bad, but was repudiated when he overthrew her father
- Eilona, named as daughter of count Aznar Galíndez in an 862 charter of her nephew, Guntislo
- Centullo, murdered by his brother-in-law García the Bad
- Galindo Aznárez I, later Count of Aragon

== Sources ==
- Collins, Roger. The Basques. Blackwell Publishing: London, 1990.
- Higounet, Charles. Bordeaux pendant le haut moyen age. Bordeaux, 1963.
- Lewis, Archibald R. The Development of Southern French and Catalan Society, 718–1050. University of Texas Press: Austin, 1965.

Preceded by Aureolus	Count of Aragon and Conflent; 809–820	Succeeded by García Galíndez
Preceded by Borrell	Count of Urgel and Cerdagne; 820–839	Succeeded by Galindo Aznárez I
