= Collegiate Church of Santa María =

Collegiate church of Santa María may refer to:

- Collegiate church of Santa María (Calatayud)
- Collegiate church of Santa María (Tudela)
