= Church of St Mary Magdalene, Tudela =

Medieval church in Navarre, Spain

Coordinates: 42.0650°N 1.6040°W

Santa María Magdalena (St Mary Magdalene) is one of a number of medieval Roman Catholic churches in Tudela, region of Navarre, Spain. It is a Romanesque style building.

== History ==
When Alfonso the Battler conquered Tudela in 1129 there was already a Mozarabic community in the city.

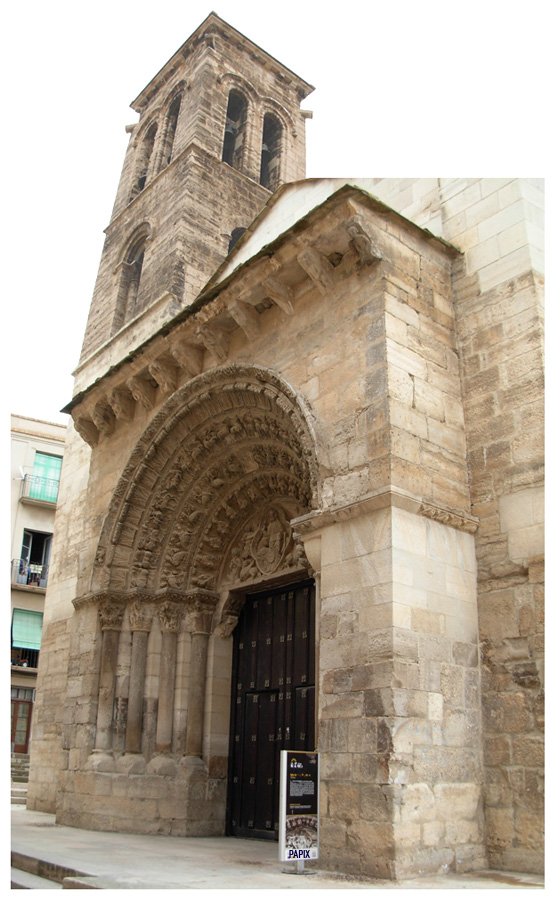
Main entrance and tower of the Magdalena church in Tudela, Navarra, Spain

The church was erected in the second half of the 12th century, perhaps on the site of a Mozarabic church. The sculpted portal is elaborately decorated with biblical scenes and those of daily life. The bell-tower is also Romanesque with a series of rounded arches. The interior has a 16th-century gilded retablo dedicated to Mary Magdalen. The chapels were built during the 16th and 17th centuries.

== Conservation ==
The church was made a Bien de Interés Cultural in 1983.
