= Al-Tutili =

Moorish writer

- أحمد بن عبد الله بن هريرة القيسي الأعمى التطيلي
- Born: Tudela, Al-Andalus (modern-day Spain)
- Died: 1126
- Occupation: Poet
- Writing career
- Language: Arabic

Abu ’l-ʿAbbās (or Abū Dj̲aʿfar) Aḥmad ibn ʿAbd Allāh ibn Hurayra al-ʿUtbī (or al-Kaysī) (Arabic: أحمد بن عبد الله بن هريرة القيسي الأعمى التطيلي) (died 1126), nicknamed al-Aʿmā al-Tuṭīlī or the Blind Poet of Tudela, was an Andalusian Arab poet who composed in Arabic. Although born in Tudela, he was raised in Seville, where he gained talent in poetry. He later lived in Murcia. He died young.

== Bibliography ==
- Al-A'ma at-Tutili, Diwan, ed. Ihsan Abbas (Beirut, 1963)
- E. Garzia Gomez, las jarchas romances de la serie árabe en su marco (Madrid 1965)
- Nykl p. 254-6
- al-Acma al-Tutili, [El ciego de Tudela]: Las moaxajas. Traducción y prólogo: M. Nuin Monreal, W. S. Alkhalifa, 2001
