= Tudela =

- Municipality
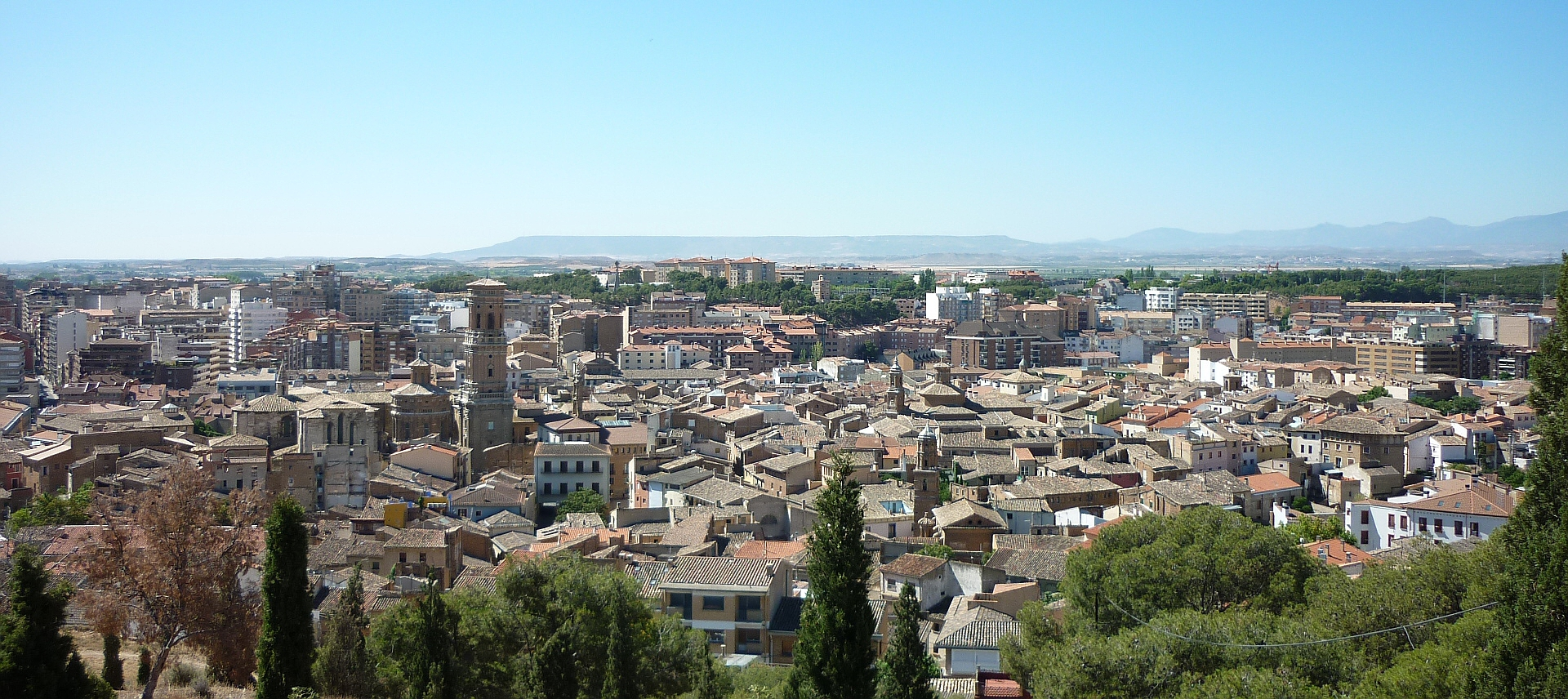

- Flag Coat of arms

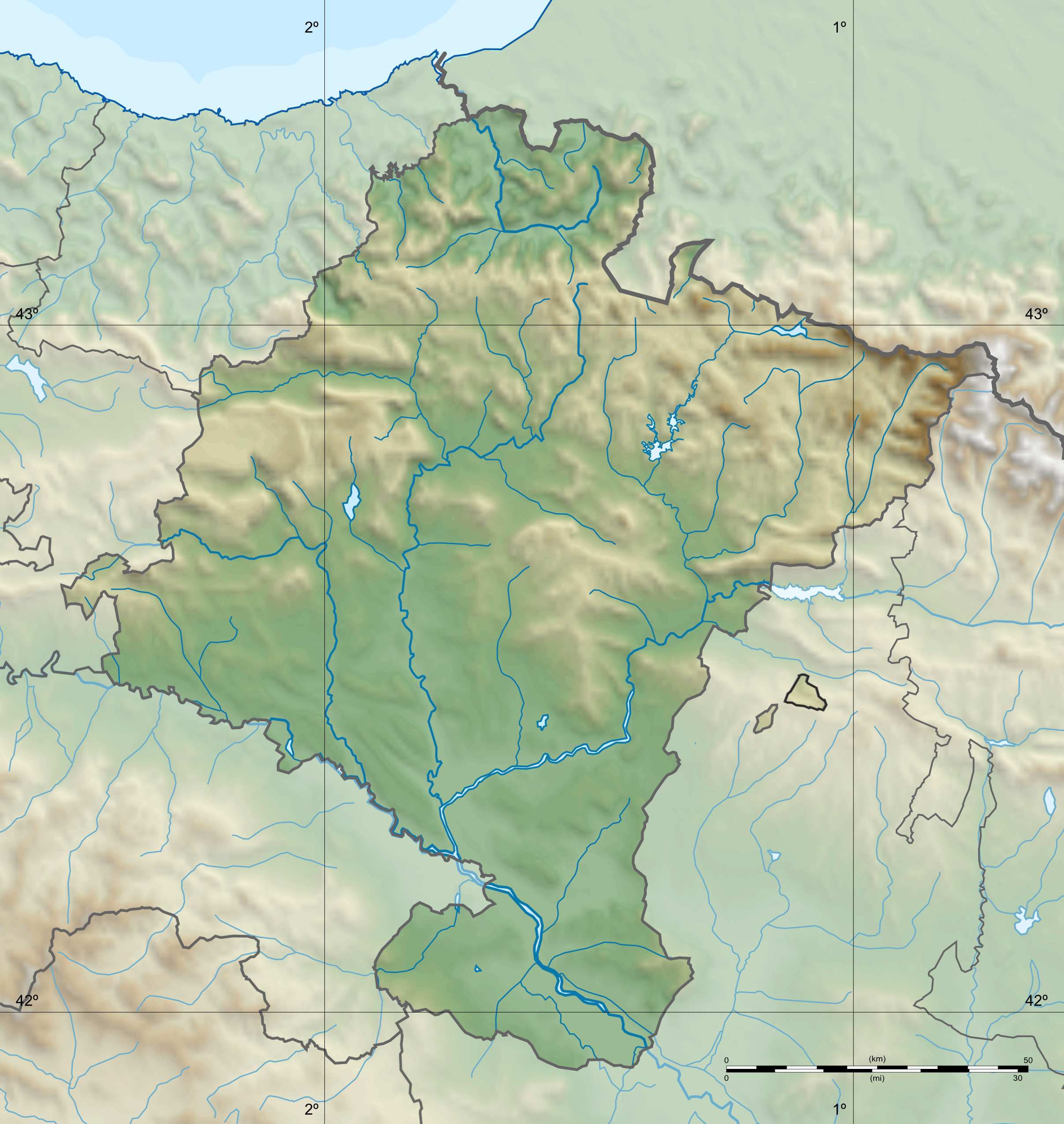
- Location within Navarre Location within Spain
- Coordinates: 42°03′55″N 1°36′24″W
- Country: Spain
- Autonomous community: Navarre

Government
  - Mayor: Alejandro Toquero Gil (Navarra Suma)

Area
  - Total: 215.7 km^{2} (83.3 sq mi)
- Elevation: 264 m (866 ft)

Population (2025-01-01)
  - Total: 38,903
  - Density: 180.4/km^{2} (467.1/sq mi)
- Demonym: Tudelanos
- Time zone: UTC+1 (CET)
  - Summer (DST): UTC+2 (CEST)
- Postal code: 31500
- Website: www.tudela.es

Tudela (Basque: Tutera) is a municipality in Spain, the second largest city of the chartered community of Navarre and twice a former Latin bishopric. Its population is around 35,000. The city is sited in the Ebro valley. Fast trains running on two-track electrified railways serve the city and two freeways (AP 68 and AP 15) join close to it. Tudela is the capital of the agricultural region of Ribera Navarra, and also the seat of the courts of its judicial district.

The city hosts an annual festival in honor of Santa Ana (mother of the Virgin Mary) which begins on 24 July at noon and continues for approximately a week. Street music, bullfights and the running of the bulls are typical events of the festival.

== History ==
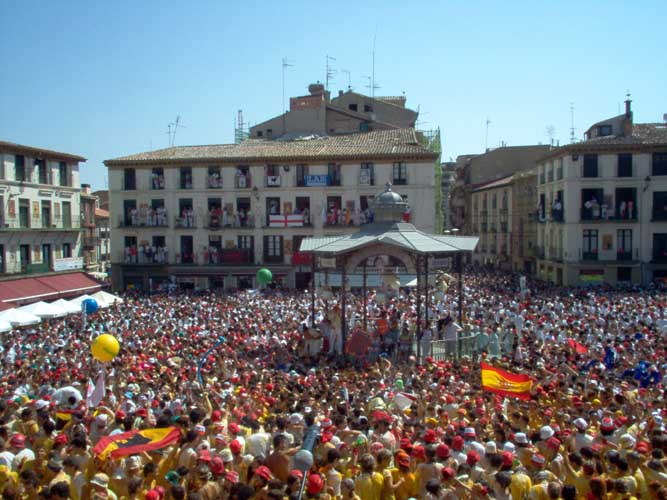
Fiestas in the Plaza Nueva or Plaza de los Fueros, July 2017, by Navarra Información website

Archeological excavations have shown that the area of Tudela has been populated since the Lower Paleolithic era. The town of Tudela was founded by the Romans on Celt-Iberian settlements. Since then the town has been inhabited continuously. The Roman poet Marcus Valerius Martialis (Epigrams Book IV, 55) "recalls in grateful verse" the town of Tutela compared to his native Bilbilis. The city was later taken by the Arabs during the Umayyad conquest of Hispania and became the Muslim emirate of Al-Hakam I in 802 under Amrus ibn Yusuf al-Muwalad. They named it تطيلة (Tatīlah).

At the beginning of the 9th century, the strategic importance of Tudela as a site on the river Ebro was enhanced by historical and political circumstances. It became the base of the Muwallad Banu Qasi family, local magnates converted to Islam that managed to stay independent of the emirs, establishing an on-off alliance and close ties with the Kings of Pamplona over the next century. With the power of the Banu Qasi fading at the onset of the 10th century, the town fell under the influence of the rising Caliphate of Córdoba and had to come up against a more aggressive policy on the part of the new dynasty ruling in Pamplona, the Ximenes, who had set up close ties with their neighbouring Christian kingdoms.

The town was used by Muslims as a bridgehead to fight against the expanding Kingdom of Navarre. When Christians under Alfonso the Battler conquered Tudela in 1119, three different religious communities were living there:

- the Muslims,
- the Mozarabs
- the Jews (see Jews in Tudela)

In the aftermath of the conquest, community relations appear to have been strained and Muslims were forced to live in a suburb outside the town walls, whereas Jews continued to reside inside the walls. The co-existence of different cultures is reflected in Tudela's reputation for producing important medieval writers such as Al-Tutili. In 1157 the English scholar Robert of Ketton, first translator of the Koran to a Western tongue (Latin), became a canon of Tudela.

The Jews were banished in 1498 (the expulsion from Navarre occurring slightly later than in the Iberian kingdoms. Muslims and Moriscos were expelled in 1516 and 1610 respectively. There are still examples of Islamic-influenced architecture in the city - the style the Spanish call Mudéjar; but the principal mosque was handed over to the Catholic Church in 1121, and by the end of the 12th century construction of the (future) cathedral of Our Lady of Solitude had begun.

Later Tudela became an important defensive point for the Kingdom of Navarre in battles with Castile and Aragon. Tudela was an Agramont party stronghold and actually the last Navarrese one to surrender to Ferdinand II of Aragon's Aragonese troops in the initial 1512 Spanish invasion of Navarre, only doing so to avoid futile bloodshed, Spanish pillaging and further confiscations to town dwellers, after the Navarrese king failed to send a relief force.

At the end of the 17th century, a new public square was built, called Plaza Nueva or Plaza de los Fueros, which became the main city square. In 1783 the Diocese of Tudela was created, split off from Pamplona.

On 23 November 1808, Napoleon Bonaparte's Marshal Lannes won the Battle of Tudela in the Peninsular War. The train station was built in 1861, which, together with the agricultural revolution, resulted in a new period of expansion for the city. The bishopric was merged back into 'Pamplona-Tudela' in 1851, restored in 1889 and ultimately suppressed in 1984.

== Main sites ==
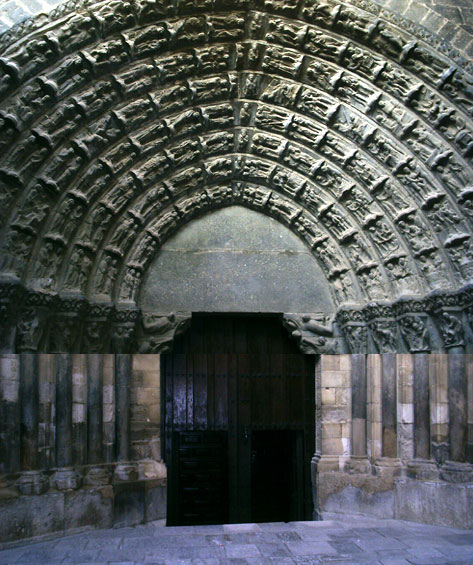
Cathedral – Puerta del Juicio

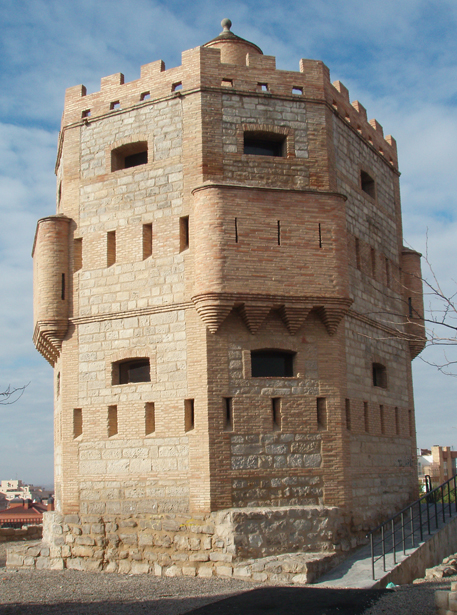
Monreal Tower

- The Cathedral of Our Lady of Solitude (12th–13th centuries). It includes examples of Romanesque architecture, such as the Puerta del Juicio, or Door of the (Last) Judgement, some Gothic influences and Baroque additions to the building.
- Church of Magdalene (12th century), in Romanesque style
- Church of San Nicolás (12th century)
- Church of San Jorge (17th century), in Baroque style

== Gastronomy ==
The Casa Salinas bakery in Tudela, known for its excellent mantecadas, closed in January 2011 after 138 years in business. Another traditional dessert is manjar blanco.

The Days of Exaltation and Festivals of the Vegetable are celebrated in the Navarra de Tudela locality during ten days, generally in the first fortnight of May or from the end of April. Although the central acts are developed in those ten days, before and after there are acts related to the days. In 2019 they will be from April 12 to May 5. Its origin is in the "Week of the Vegetable" that began to be organized in the 80s. In the current format it has been developed since 1994 (this year the twentieth edition is celebrated). They were declared Fiestas of National Tourist Interest in the year 2011. There are hundreds of events that take place before, during and after the Days of Exaltation and Festivals of the Vegetable since Tudela and its fertile orchard allow to enjoy different seasonal products. From the firing of the announcing rocket until the last day of celebration are hundreds of acts that can be enjoyed: from gastronomic routes with pinchos and menus where the vegetable is the protagonist until popular dinners, contests of stews with vegetables, workshops, talks and even a tweeter encounter called "vegetables & tweets". The main events are the weekend with the "General Chapter of the Order of Volatín" which includes the proclamation of the festivities, the appointment of the Knight of Honor and the Prize Exaltation of the Vegetable.

All these acts are completed with the Great Concert of the Days of the Vegetables where a renowned musical group animates the Saturday night.

== Education ==
- Universidad Nacional de Educación a distancia
- Universidad Pública de Navarra
- IES Benjamín de Tudela
- IES Valle del Ebro
- Colegio San Francisco Javier
- CP Virgen de la Cabeza
- CP Monte de San Julián
- CP Elvira España
- CP Griseras
- Colegio Anunciata
- Colegio Compañía de María
- Escuela Técnico Industrial ETI

== Transport ==
The town is served by the Tudela de Navarra railway station on the Casetas–Bilbao railway.

== Notable locals ==
- Abraham Abulafia, founder of the school of Prophetic Kabbalah. He lived his childhood and some of his youth in Tudela
- Abraham ibn Ezra, distinguished Jewish scholar
- Yehuda Halevi, Jewish poet and philosopher
- Benjamin of Tudela, Jewish explorer and figure in medieval geography
- Shem-Tob ibn Shaprut, Jewish philosopher, physician, and polemicist
- Robert d'Aguiló (c.1100–c.1159), governor of Tudela
- Robert of Ketton (c.1110–c.1160), canon of Tudela and Arabist
- Berengaria of Navarre, wife of Richard the Lionheart
- Michael de Villanueva, known by the pseudonym Servetus, Christian reformer, physician, astronomer, and humanist
- William of Tudela, writer
- José Castel (1737–1807), composer of zarzuelas
- Fernando Remacha (1898–1984), composer
- Rafael Moneo (b. 1937), architect
- Ismael Urzaiz (b. 1971), Spanish footballer

== Twin towns ==
- (France) Mauleon-Soule, French Basque Country, since 1965
- Tiberias, Israel, since 1984
- Mont-de-Marsan, France, since 1986

== Sources and external links ==
- Ayuntamiento de Tudela (Spanish)
- Medieval History of Navarre Spanish)
- City of Tudela (Spanish)
- GCatholic - Tudela diocese
- GCatholic - Tudela cathedral
- Town Festivals (Spanish)
- Tudela, euskomedia.org; accessed 23 November 2016.(in Spanish)
