= Tudela Cathedral =

- Cathedral of Santa María
- Spanish: Catedral de Santa María
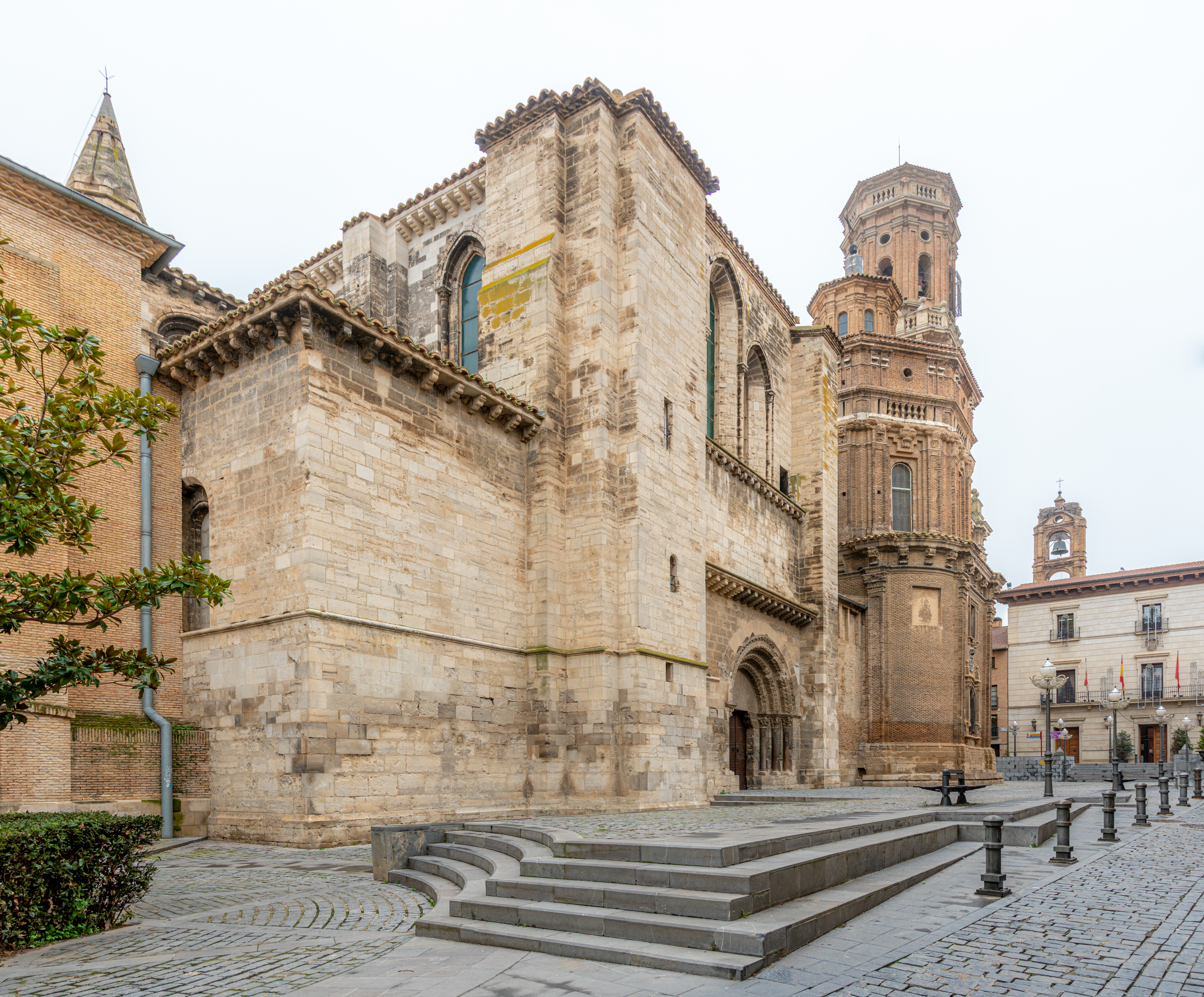
- North façade

- Location in Navarre
- 42.0636°N 1.6054°W
- Location: Plaza Vieja, Tudela, Navarre, Spain
- Country: Spain
- Denomination: Roman Catholic Church

Architecture
- Functional status: Active
- Heritage designation: Bien de Interés Cultural (no. RI-51-0000044)
- Designated: 1884
- Architectural type: church
- Style: Romanesque, Gothic, Renaissance
- Years built: 1168–1270

Administration
- Archdiocese: Roman Catholic Archdiocese of Pamplona and Tudela

The Cathedral of Santa María la Mayor (Santa Maria the Major, or Santa Maria the Great) of Tudela (Navarre) is a late Romanesque church, inspired by Cistercian architecture, of large dimensions, which began to be built at the end of the 12th century during the reign of Sancho VI the Wise, passing the baton to his son Sancho VII the Strong, who in turn passed it to his nephew Theobald I. It used some of the foundations of the Great Mosque of Tudela (9th to 11th centuries). As the orientations of the two temples did not coincide, the mosque was demolished to build the new temple and only some of its foundations were reused.

The current temple is located between the present-day Plaza Vieja and the streets Roso, Portal and Horno Higuera in the old town of Tudela.

Initially it served as the collegiate church of Santa María, being elevated to a cathedral in the 18th century by Pope Pius VI when Tudela was separated from the diocese of the neighbouring city of Tarazona. The new dignity was granted at the request of Charles III. A century later, in 1884, it was declared a national monument.

== General description ==
The Cathedral of Tudela is a Cistercian temple built in ashlar according to the schemes of the Cathedral of Sigüenza, individualised with details taken from the nearby Abbey of Santa María de la Oliva and the Monastery of Santa María de Valbuena. It is of large dimensions, with approximately 3,380 m² (65 m × 52 m) not counting the cloister. It is a building with three naves of four bays, the central one being wider, with a transept of five bays, and a quintuple chevet with a deep central semicircular apse presided over by a large 15th-century altarpiece, painted by Pedro Díaz de Oviedo. It has three doorways: the Door of Santa María (to the north), the Door of the Last Judgement (to the west) and the Door of the Virgin (to the south).

Its chapels and altarpieces are numerous, among which stand out the Romanesque stone image of the White Virgin, from the 12th century, and the Gothic painted altarpieces of Saint Catherine and Our Lady of Hope, both from the 15th century. In the latter chapel is the magnificent Gothic tomb of the Chancellor Villaespesa. Also worth highlighting is the Baroque chapel of Saint Anne, patron saint of the city, represented in a Gothic carving, and the magnificent Renaissance choir stalls carved in the 16th century by Esteban de Obray. The temple is topped by a late Romanesque tower on one side of the Door of the Last Judgement, and another large Renaissance brick tower next to the Chapel of Saint Anne. The Romanesque cloister, from the late 12th century, is located to the south of the temple and has double columns and historiated capitals: it forms a sculptural ensemble of great richness.

== History and chronology of construction ==
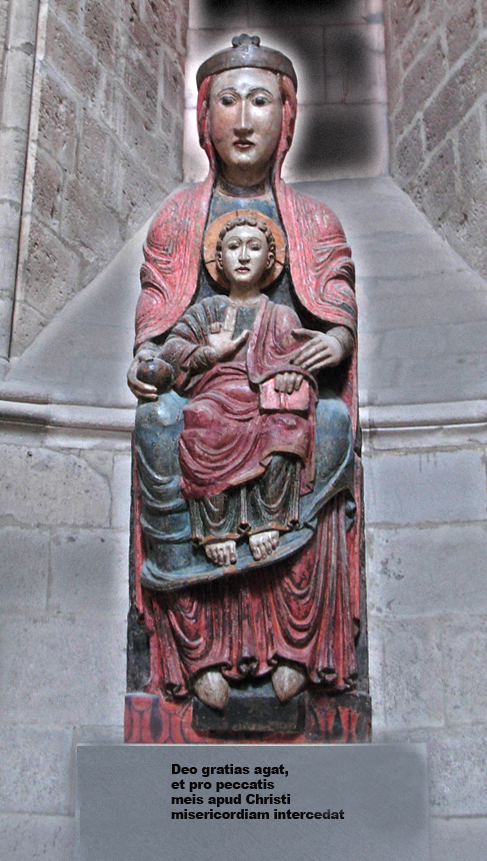
Romanesque Virgin known as "La Blanca".

The cathedral began to be built near the original parish church and collegiate church of Santa María la Blanca, a temple, perhaps Mozarabic, which apparently occupied a space adjacent to the Great Mosque of Tudela. The construction of the cathedral began during the reign of Sancho VI the Wise, around 1168. It is known that in this year, the chapter of the church of Santa María acquired a large number of houses and shops adjoining the Great Mosque, formally initiating the construction of the present cathedral of Tudela. There is also mention of the donation of other houses for the construction of the new cloister of Santa María.

By 1188, the construction must have been sufficiently advanced to make use of what had already been built, as the dedication or consecration took place that year. The chevet and the transept belong to the first phase of construction. Afterwards, at the end of the 12th century, came the perimeter walls and the Door of the Last Judgement, prior to the French Gothic explosion and during the reign of Sancho VII the Strong. The construction continued for almost the entire 13th century, being completed during the reign of Theobald I the Troubadour. The doors of the transept were built in 1186 and the Door of the Last Judgement in 1200. The Romanesque cloister, one of the masterpieces of Navarrese Romanesque art, was built at the end of the 12th century, between 1180 and 1206. The consecration of the Main Altarpiece of the chevet took place on 11 June 1494, by Bishop Don Guillermo, vicar of the Bishop of Tarazona in Tudela. The choir was built in the 16th century.

The cathedral had a late Romanesque tower that was completed in 1228, serving as a bell tower. However, this tower is not the one that has survived to our day, as it collapsed in 1676. The New Tower was built at the end of the 17th century, between 1682 and 1697. It had a large spire that crowned the tower, but it was destroyed by a spectacular fire in 1747. The magnificent Baroque chapel of Saint Anne was built between 1712 and 1724, once the new tower of the cathedral was completed. The existing space was enlarged to create a chapel of greater sumptuousness.

At the end of the 19th century, after the chapter obtained the declaration as a national monument (6 December 1884), proposed by the Real Academia de la Historia, state funds were secured to undertake its restoration. Previously, the Comisión de Monumentos Históricos y Artísticos de Navarra assumed custody on 10 February 1885 and appointed Rafael Gaztelu Murga, Juan Iturralde y Suit and Fernández as members.

The cathedral was significantly restored in the early 21st century and was reopened on 16 July 2006.

== Architectural styles ==
- Romanesque: the first phase.
- Gothic.
- Renaissance, Churrigueresque — the chapels added in subsequent centuries.

== Access doorways ==
There are three main doorways: the Door of the Last Judgement (west), the Door of Santa María (north) and the Portal Door or Door of the Virgin (south). All three doorways are Romanesque in style, although the western one presents a more refined and complex style in its carvings.

Doorways

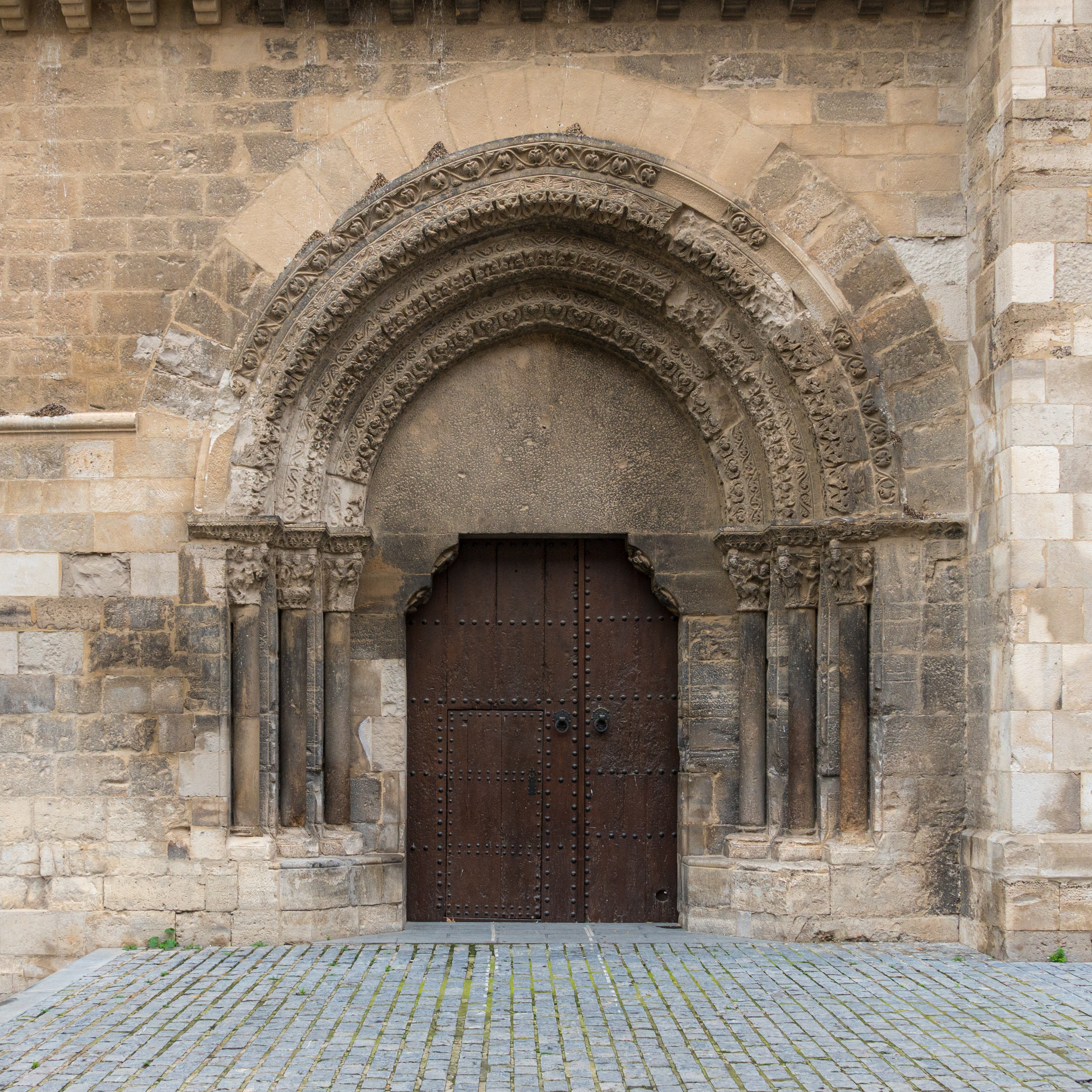
Door of Santa María – North

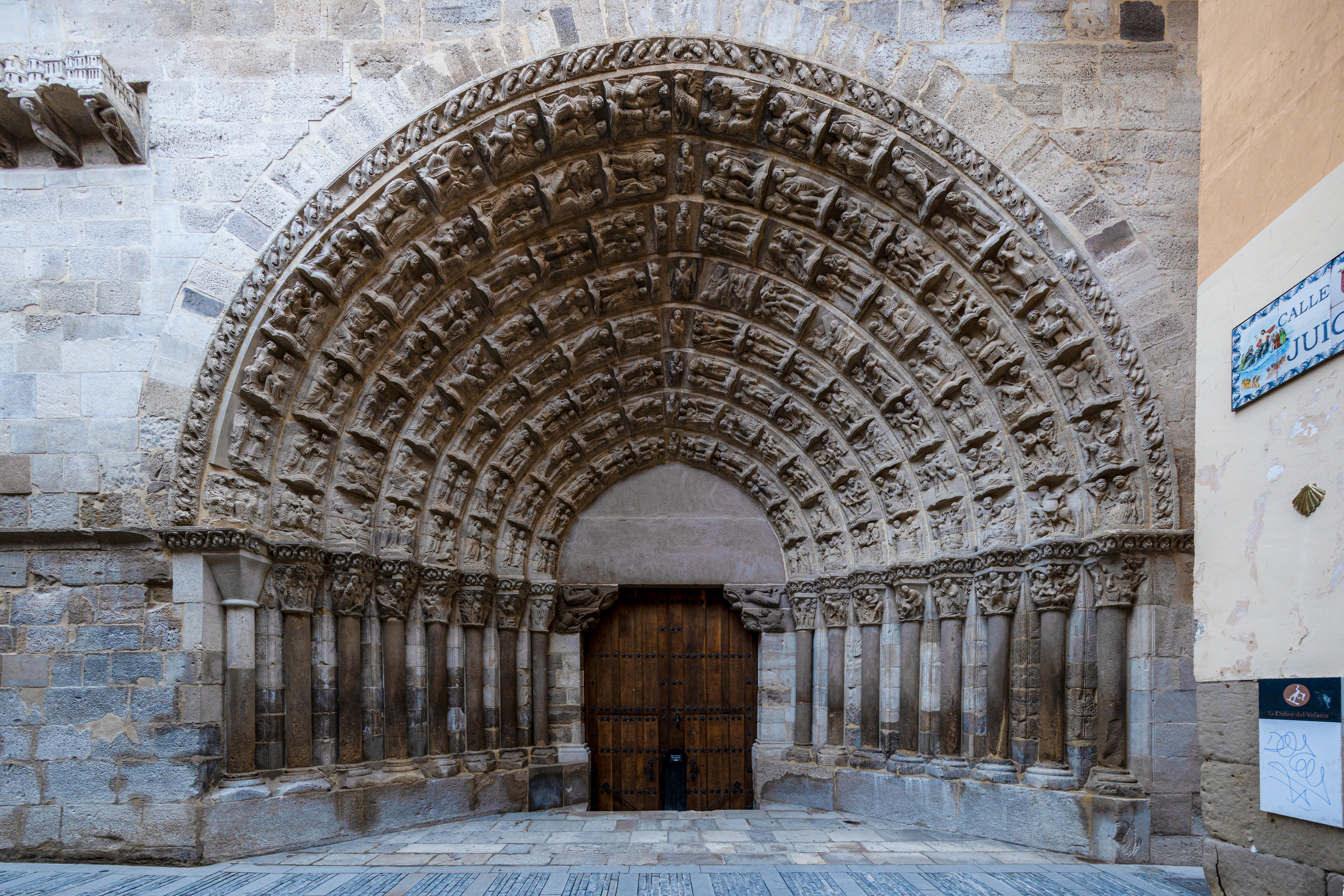
Door of the Last Judgement – West

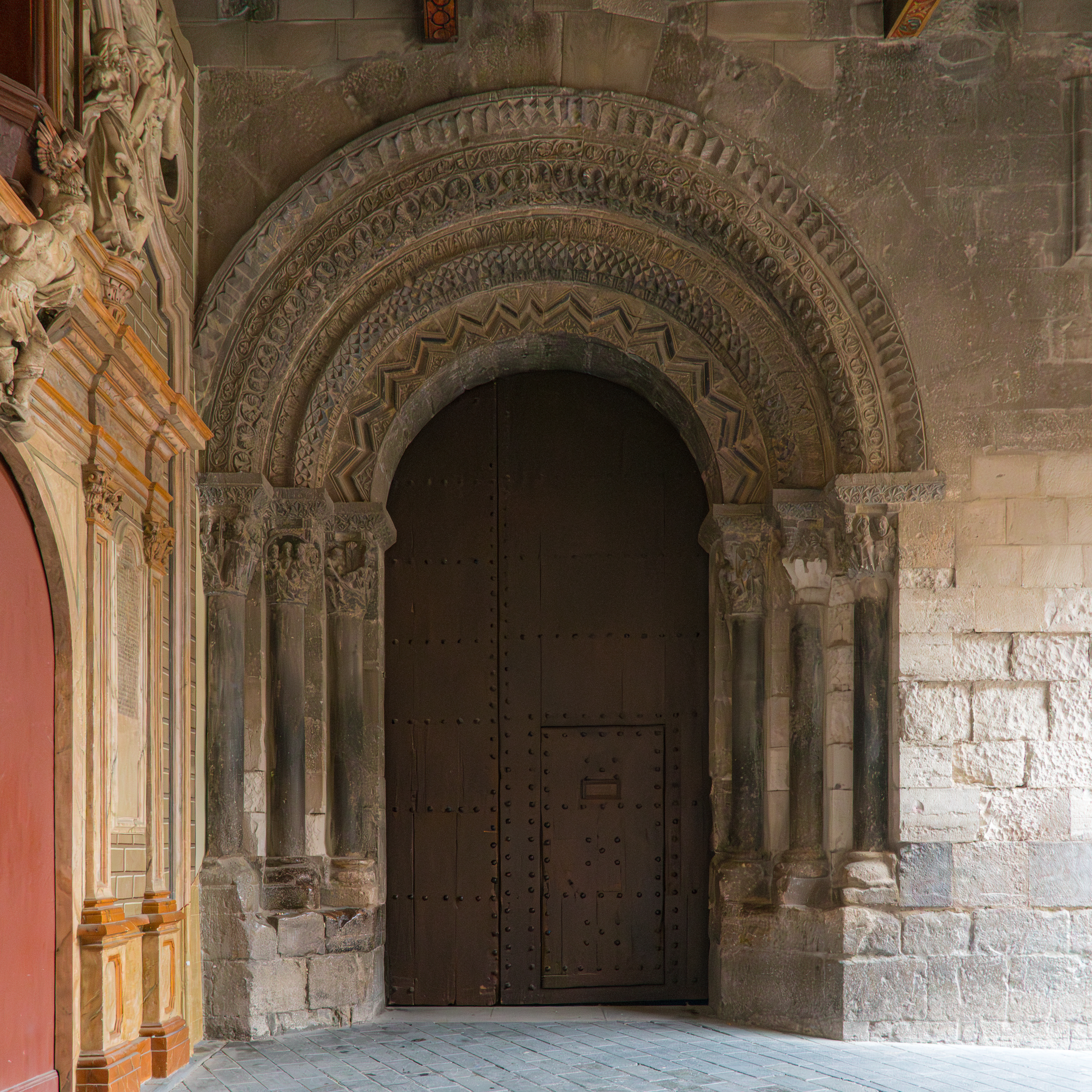
Portal Door or Door of the Virgin – South

=== Door of the Last Judgement ===
Also known as the West Door, the Door of the Last Judgement of the Cathedral of Tudela is the main entrance.

==== Chronology ====
It was the last of the three doorways to be opened, with its construction dated from the final years of the 12th century and the first decades of the 13th century, coinciding with the reign of Sancho VII "the Strong".

==== Style ====
The Door of the Last Judgement blends the Romanesque style of its iconography with the Gothic of its structure and sculpture. Indeed, this work is considered one of the first manifestations of Gothic sculpture on the Iberian Peninsula.

==== Structure ====
It consists of a large splayed arch divided into 8 archivolts resting on an equal number of columns located on both sides of the wooden entrance door, making a total of 16 pillars supporting the arch. The 8 archivolts are decorated with 115 voussoirs and 8 keystones.

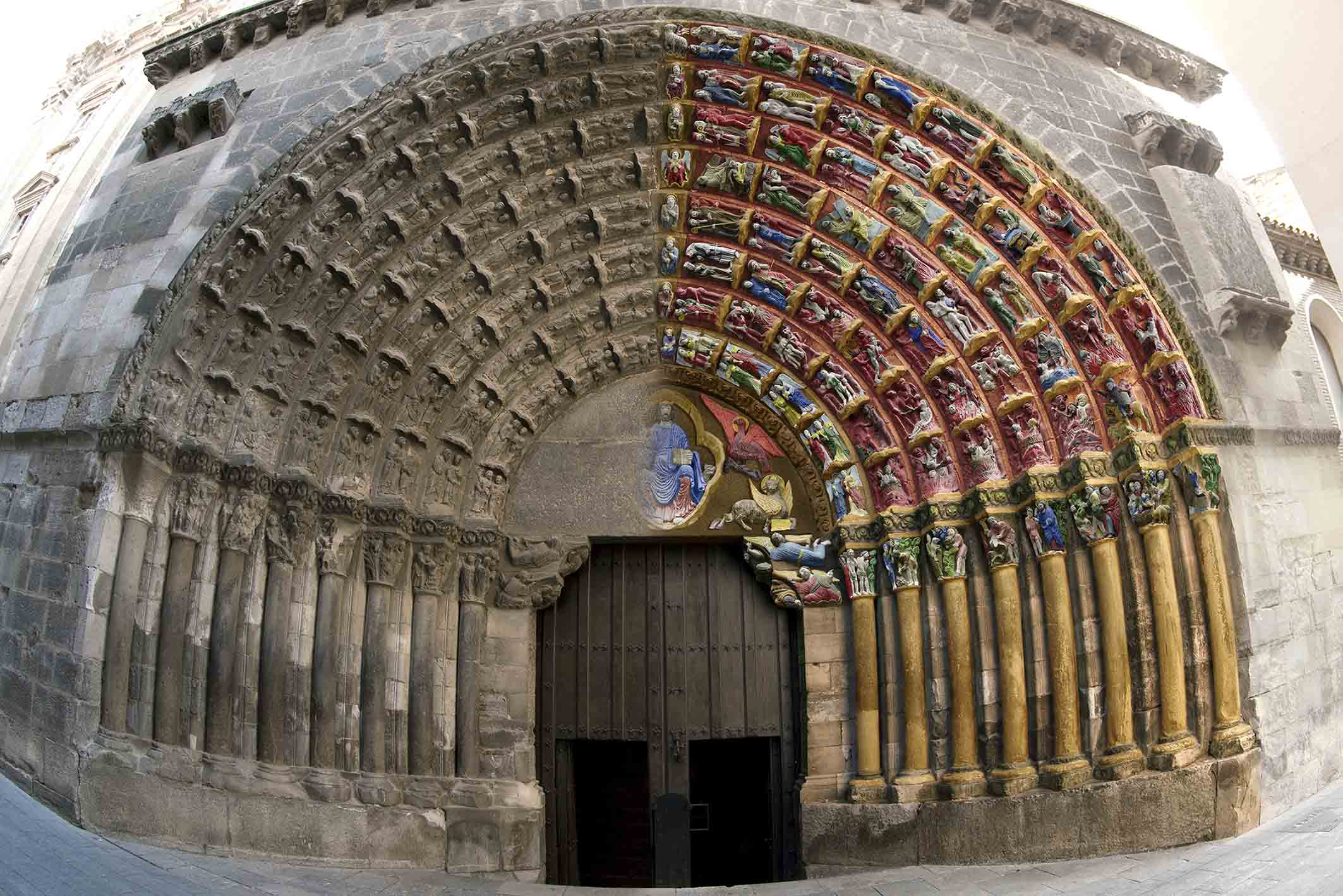
Door of the Last Judgement. Polychrome recreation of "Hell" by Blanca Aldanondo and Diego Carasusán.

==== Iconography ====
The Door of the Last Judgement takes its name from the scene represented by the carvings contained therein:

- The Last Judgement. The porch depicts the separation of the damned and the blessed following God's divine sentence. Thus, the left half (from the viewer's position) is reserved for the saved in Heaven, while on the right half the reprobates appear in Hell. "Avarice" and "lust" are the sins most frequently depicted in the Hell scenes of this period. The former seems to be related to the Jews who lived in the city and engaged in moneylending. A new piece of information discovered in 2015 concerns the Gamblers; until then these voussoirs were identified as "money changers" because it was assumed that what they held in their hands was an abacus, but upon identifying the board as that of a medieval game, its interpretation is debated. Other sins represented include homosexuality, lying and gluttony.
- In addition to this division into Heaven and Hell, the Door of the Last Judgement presents two other parts: the common elements and the Genesis. The common elements are those scenes in which figures appear that do not properly belong to Heaven or Hell scenes, but form an essential part of the Apocalypse narrative and, specifically, of the Last Judgement. Spatially, these scenes are located on the central axis of the porch, occupying the line of keystones, the corbels and the jambs, as well as the tympanum, although this element currently contains no image. As for the Genesis, these scenes are found in the capitals of the 16 columns that support the arch. They show images relating to various passages from the first book of the Bible: Genesis.
- A judgement without a judge: The tympanum of the Door of the Last Judgement currently bears no image. In fact, it is not known what may have once adorned it, although the remaining elements and the message conveyed by the Door, relating to the Day of the Last Judgement, indicate that the tympanum must originally have borne an image of Christ the Judge.
- A unique work in the world: The Door of the Last Judgement is a unique work in Western Christian art thanks to the treatment that the author of the porch gave to Hell, reserving half of its surface for scenes of the Underworld. In total, 50 voussoirs are dedicated to infernal punishments, two more than those reserved for the blessed in Heaven.

=== Door of Santa María ===
It is located in the north wall. It once faced the medieval cemetery adjoining the temple (it currently faces the Plaza Vieja). It is slightly pointed and has a tympanum, although its decoration has disappeared. It consists of three highly decorated archivolts, with friezes of various designs, resting on historiated capitals.

=== Door of the Virgin ===
It is located in the south wall. It is also called the Portal Door. It is the oldest of the three, in Romanesque style, with a semicircular arch. It has no tympanum and consists of three archivolts decorated with geometric patterns resting on historiated capitals. It is covered by a porch with two large ogival arches, a characteristic symbol of Portal Street (hence its nickname). The stretch of Portal Street running from Verjas Street to the porch covering this doorway has been known since time immemorial as "Cuesta de Lagos", because it contained the stone silos where the faithful deposited their tithes (grain, oil, wine, etc.) to the church.

== West façade ==
Above the Door of the Last Judgement there is an enormous rose window with stone ribs and alabaster panels that allow faint light to enter the interior. On the same façade there is a stone tower (late Romanesque) on its right side, with a square lower body and an octagonal upper body with pointed arch windows on four of its sides and an octagonal spired roof. This tower presumably had a twin companion on the left side, though this has not been confirmed.

== New Tower ==
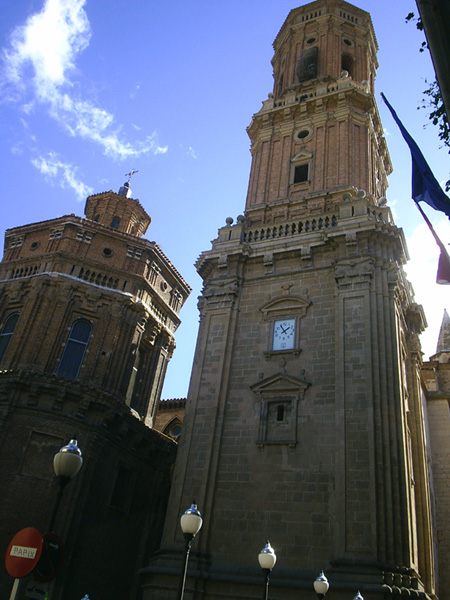
New Tower.

The current tower, in Renaissance style, was built between 1682 and 1697 and replaces the original late Romanesque–proto-Gothic tower, which collapsed on 21 June 1676. It consists of three sections, the first two with a square plan and the third octagonal, reaching a total height of 50 metres. The first section is built in stone and the last two in brick. It had a wooden spire covered with lead, approximately 29 metres tall, that crowned the tower, but it was destroyed by a spectacular fire in 1747. In the end, a simple flat cap roof was chosen.

The original late Romanesque tower, completed in 1228, collapsed and caused major damage to the nearest naves and possibly to the rose window and the right tower of the façade. The form of this bell tower is unknown, but it probably consisted of three sections with a square plan. The last two sections would probably have had two pointed arch windows on each side, following the late Romanesque or proto-Gothic style. It would have been topped by a more or less pointed pyramidal roof.

== Interior of the cathedral ==
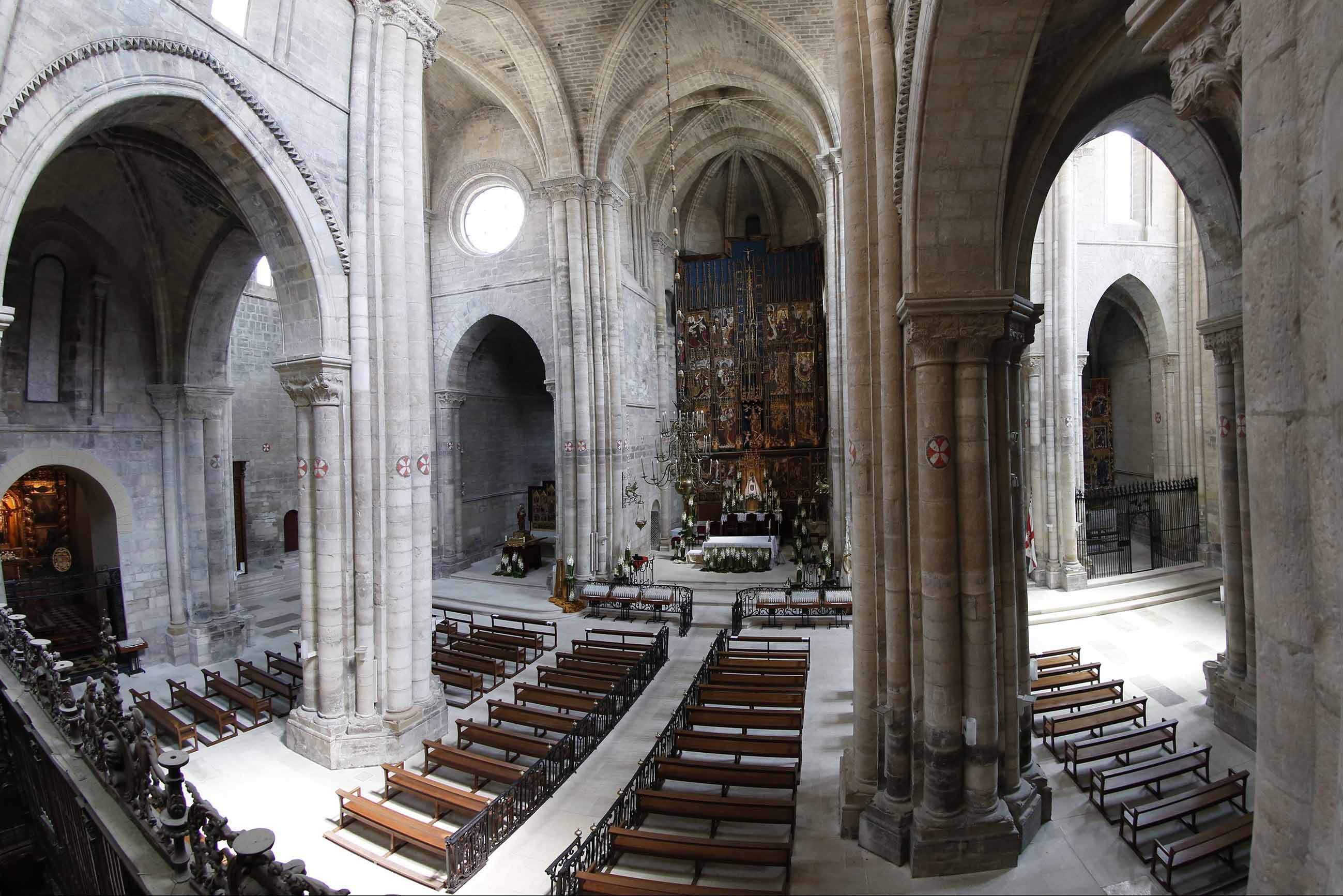
Transept

On the interior of the cathedral, on each side of the main apse, a semicircular chapel and a square one open up, giving a total of five chapels at the head of the cathedral. Behind the chevet of the cathedral is the Sacristy, from the 17th century but remodelled in neoclassical style in 1792, and the Chapter House, built in the mid-17th century. In the central part of the cathedral is the Choir.

In the central apse is the High Altar. On the right, on the Epistle side, are the chapels of Saint John the Evangelist and Our Lady of Hope; on the left, on the Gospel side, are the chapels of Saint Joachim and Saint Martin. Entering through the Door of the Last Judgement towards its right side (Epistle side), one finds the chapel of Saint Peter followed by that of Saint Joachim (although after the temple's restoration, the altarpiece together with the image was moved to a side of the temple, next to the chapel of Saint Anne) and then the door giving access to the cloister, and finally the chapel of the Holy Spirit, recently restored by removing the limewash from the images. Entering through the Door of the Last Judgement towards its left side (Gospel side), one finds the altarpiece of Saint Martin, then the chapel of Saint Anthony (located in the space of the New Tower) and the Baptistery, followed by the dazzling chapel of Saint Anne and, finally, the chapel of the Sorrowful Virgin, where the Christ of the Bed is currently located.

=== High Altar ===
It is presided over by the main altarpiece of the cathedral in the Hispano-Flemish Gothic style, from the end of the 15th century (1487–1492), whose authors are Pedro Díaz de Oviedo and Diego del Águila.

=== Chapel of Saint Anne ===
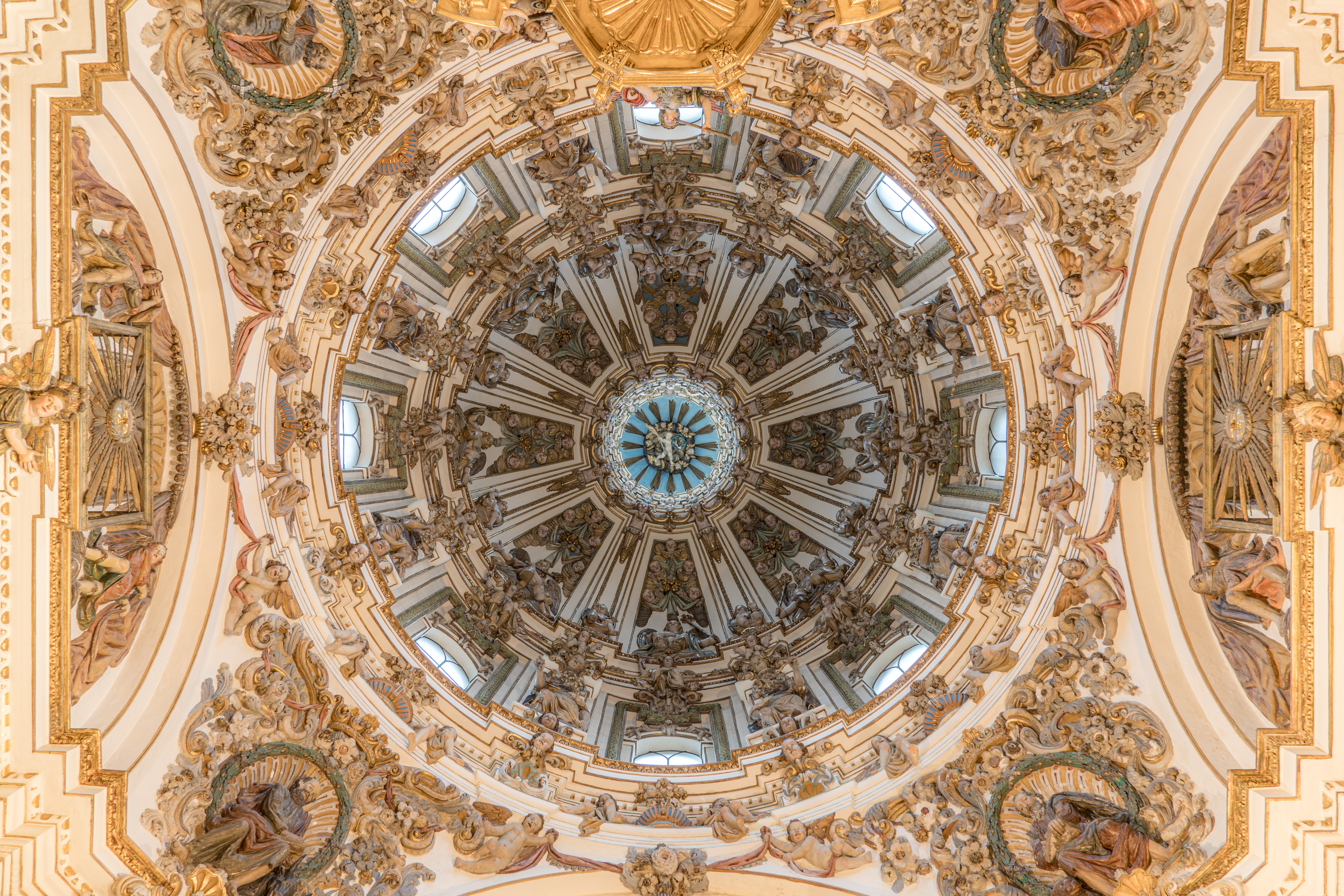
Dome of the Chapel of Saint Anne

It is the largest chapel in the cathedral, in the 18th-century Baroque style. It has an irregular octagonal floor plan and is covered by an octagonal dome on a drum flanked by eight windows. Its altarpiece dates from the 18th century and houses the patron saint of the city, an image of Saint Anne Triplex.

=== Chapel of the Holy Spirit ===
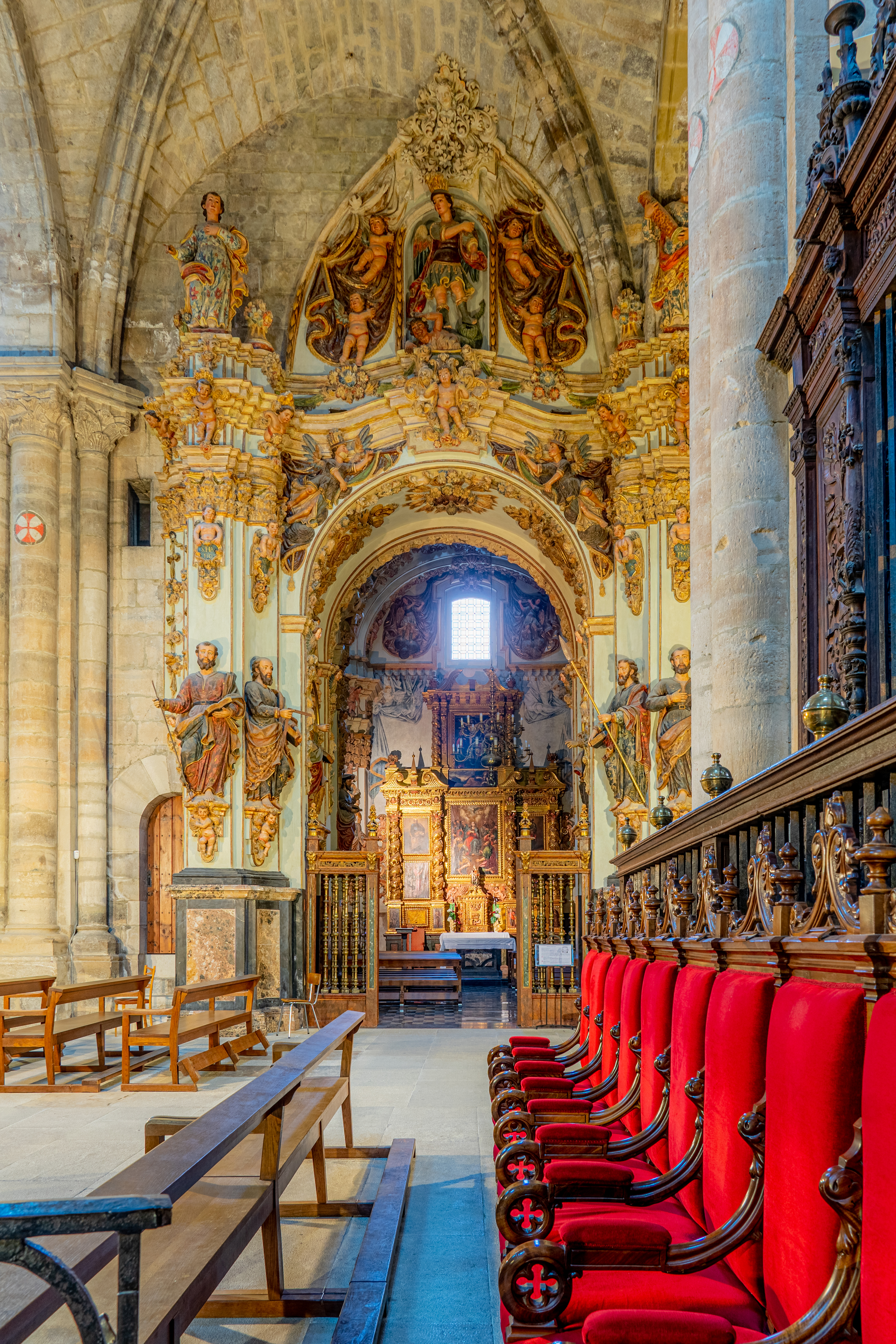
Chapel of the Holy Spirit

It was originally created to connect already existing chapels. It is in fact a small parish church built in 1738, approximately 25 m in length. It has a highly ornate Baroque style, consisting mainly of stucco plasterwork of various colours. The nave bay is covered by a groin vault and the chapel bay by a slightly oval dome. It contains altarpieces from the 17th and 18th centuries. Among the iconography present, notable figures include Saint Anne (patron saint of Tudela), Saint Fermin and Saint Francis Xavier (co-patron saints of the Kingdom of Navarre). During the recent renovation of the sacristy of the chapel, the wall of the ancient Great Mosque of Tudela came to light, having remained hidden until that moment.

=== Choir ===
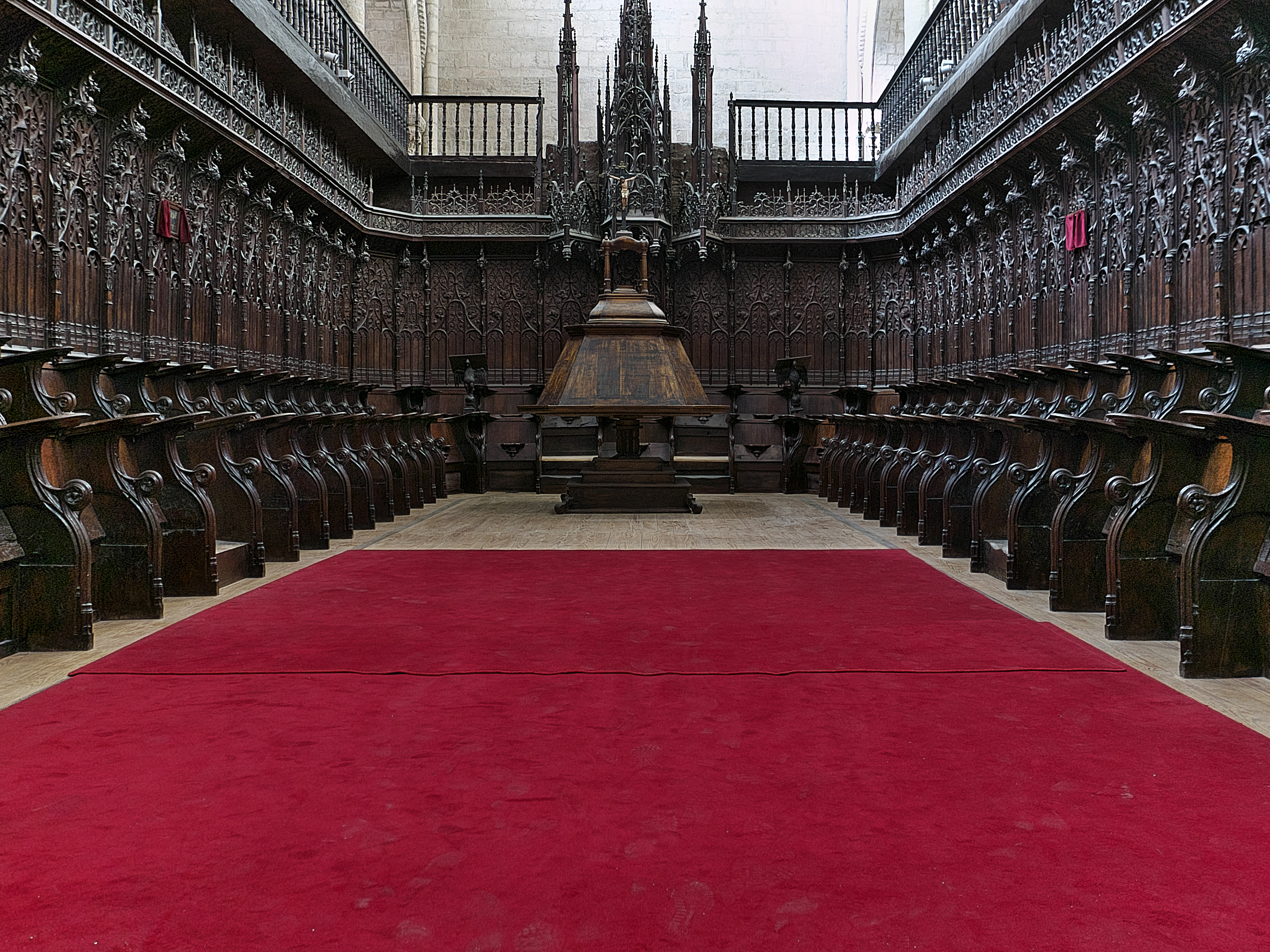
Cathedral Choir.

Accessed through a Plateresque grille. It is composed of 37 lower and 49 upper stalls in Flamboyant Gothic style. It contains an 18th-century organ.

The outer walls of the Choir are lined with chapels from the 17th and 18th centuries:

- Chapel of Saint Joseph
- Chapel of the Purification of Our Lady
- Chapel of Our Lady of the Forsaken
- Chapel of Saint Thomas of Villanova
- Chapel of Saint John the Evangelist: a semicircular chapel located to the left of the high altar, containing three principal elements:
  - The White Virgin, a free-standing Romanesque statue from the 12th century, over 1.90 m tall, divided during its construction into two parts to create a cavity inside, where remains of bones and a red Mozarabic cloth were found. It was housed in a niche in the high altar, behind the altarpiece, and was moved to its current location after its discovery. It has been recently restored, revealing its original colour.
  - A tomb set into the floor in bas-relief, belonging to Richard Alexandris.
  - A Gothic tomb with a free-standing effigy, belonging to Don Sancho Sánchez de Oteiza, who had it built during his lifetime but is not buried in it, as he was appointed Cardinal-Bishop and went to live in Pamplona, where another tomb was built for him in the Cathedral of Santa María in Pamplona.
- Chapel of Our Lady of Hope: a square chapel closed off with a Flamboyant Gothic grille, containing a Gothic altarpiece and the Gothic tomb of the Chancellor of the Kingdom of Navarre, also Gothic, from the 15th century.
- Chapel of Saint Joachim: a semicircular chapel containing the altarpiece of Saint Catherine from the 15th century.
- Chapel of Saint Martin: a square chapel closed off with a Plateresque grille from the 16th century.
- Chapels of the Christ of the Bed and of Saint Peter: both from the 16th century, the first of which gives access to the second through a small door.
- Chapel of Saint Anthony and New Tower: an octagonal chapel containing a Mannerist altarpiece from the 17th century.
- Baptistery: a small chapel containing the 16th-century baptismal font.
- Chapel of the Sorrowful Virgin: a square chapel containing an early Baroque altarpiece from the 17th century.

== Altarpieces ==
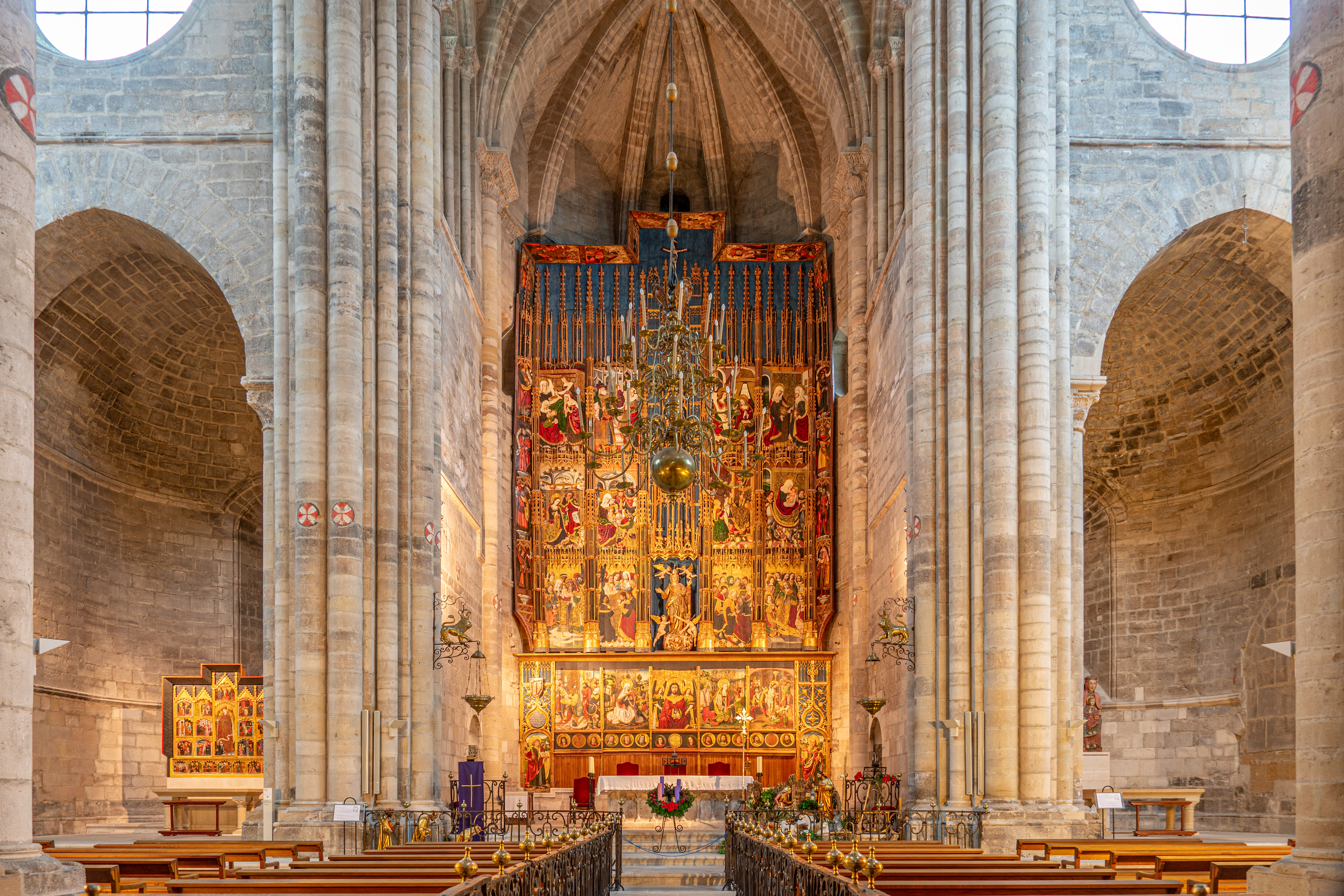
High Altar and altarpiece

The presbytery of the Cathedral of Tudela is presided over by a Hispano-Flemish altarpiece painted by Pedro Díaz de Oviedo between 1487 and 1494 with the collaboration of Diego del Águila and other disciples, among whom Juan Gascó may be counted. It rests on a wide base comprising, in turn, a predella and a sub-predella, above which rise three registers of five bays formed by complex Gothic tracery of mouldings and canopies terminating in sharp pinnacles; the central bay is distinguished by a very slender open-work fleche above whose summit rests a small carving of the Crucified Christ. It is framed by a wide canopy decorated equally with open-work tracery.

In the sub-predella there are panel paintings with the heads of the Apostles inside circular medallions, plus the heads of two weeping angels whose faces show very expressive features; the intermediate heads of the outer bays are the product of a restoration carried out in 1855 by Basc.

On either side of the base are two doors, depicting against a landscape background the figures of Saint Peter and Saint Paul carrying their respective attributes.

Above the effigy of the latter are the chains of Las Navas de Tolosa, donated, according to tradition, to the Collegiate Church by Sancho the Strong, accompanied by the inscription:

CADENAS Q(UE) DIO A ESTA IGL(ESI)A EL S(EÑO)R REY D(ON) SANCHO EL FUERTE Y VII DE NAVARRA DE LAS Q(UE) ROMPIÓ DE LA TIENDA DE MIRAMAMOLIN EN LA BATALLA DE LAS NAVAS DE TOLOSA AÑO 1212.

The predella narrates various episodes of the Passion, such as Pilate washing his hands, the Virgin against a landscape background with the scene of the Prayer in the Garden of Gethsemane, the Man of Sorrows supported by angels dressed as deacons, the Magdalene against a background of the Road to Calvary – in the image – and the Flagellation with the tiny scene of the Denial of Saint Peter in the far background. In the registers, episodes from the Life of the Virgin are distributed. Eight figures of Prophets appearing on the sides of the canopy complete the painting of this magnificent ensemble.

== Romanesque cloister ==
It has a rectangular plan, with the east and west sides being the longest. It has a semicircular arcade, with nine arches on the shorter sides and twelve on the longer ones. Some authors have wished to place here the remains of the original church of Santa María la Blanca. It is known that in 1186 houses were donated for the construction of the cloister. From the cloister, on the eastern side, one can access a Mudéjar chapel, the Escuela del Cristo. The chapel was probably built in the 13th century, although the decoration of the wooden structures belongs to the 15th century. In terms of structure and decoration it recalls medieval synagogues and it has been estimated that the Great Synagogue of Tudela may have stood here. The capitals are the main point of interest of this cloister, with biblical, religious and fantastical scenes narrated on them. The 42 historiated capitals of the cloister bear similarities to those of other Navarrese and Aragonese cloisters, and some of them are dedicated to the Jacobean pilgrimage, such as the one dedicated to Saint James the Apostle himself:

- North wing: from the birth of Jesus to washing the feet of the Apostles (passing through The Presentation of Jesus in the Temple, and various miracles such as The Resurrection of Lazarus, The Wedding at Cana, etc.)
- East wing: continuation of the life of Jesus up to the scene of his Ascension.
- South wing: from the Assumption of the Virgin, through the martyrdoms of saints (Saint Lawrence, Saint Andrew, Saint James, Saint John the Baptist, etc.)
- West wing, among other subjects: birds and intertwined plants, musicians, Saint Martin cutting his cloak, birds of prey devouring rabbits, the parable of Dives and Lazarus, the Annunciation, etc.
Cloister of the Cathedral of Tudela

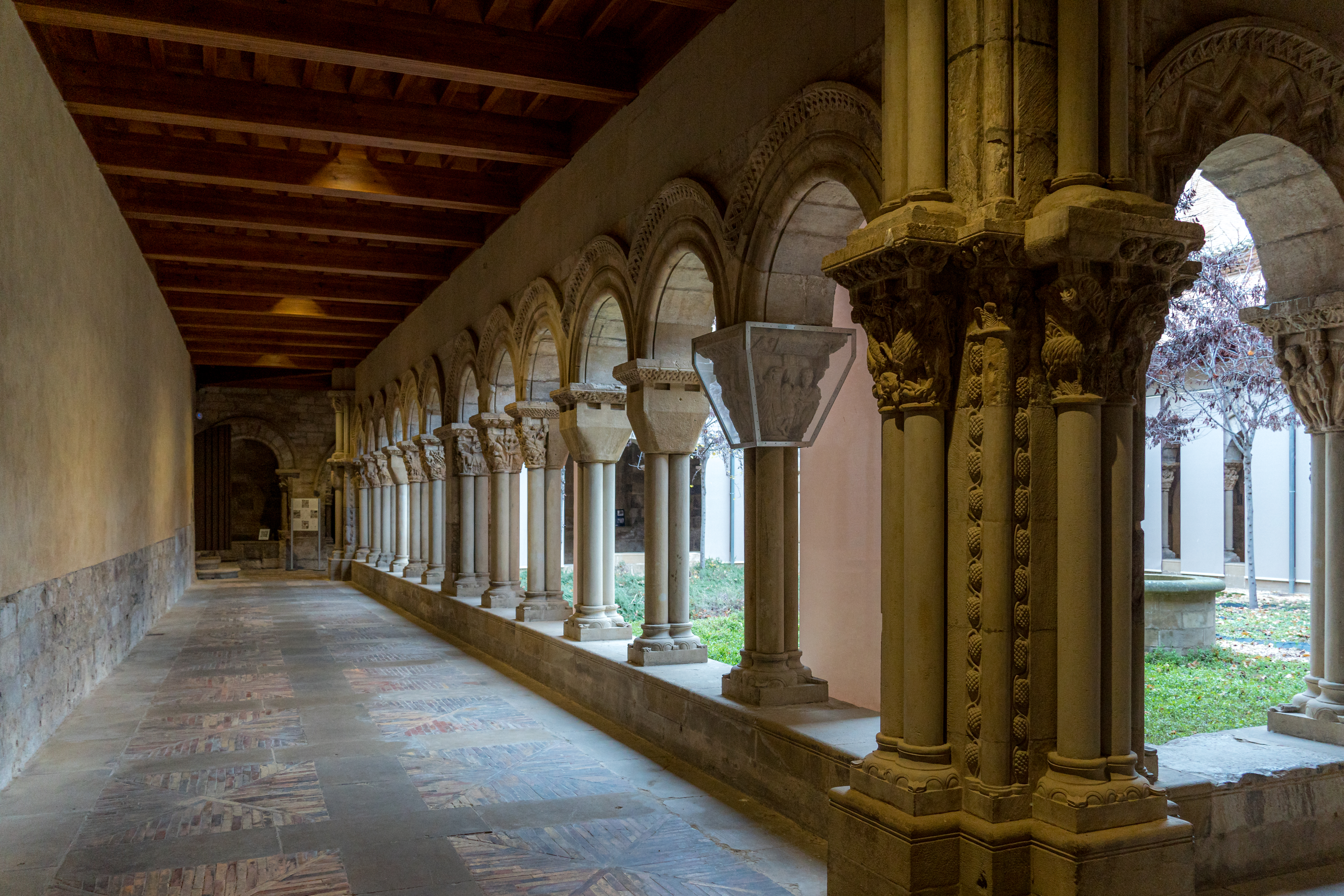

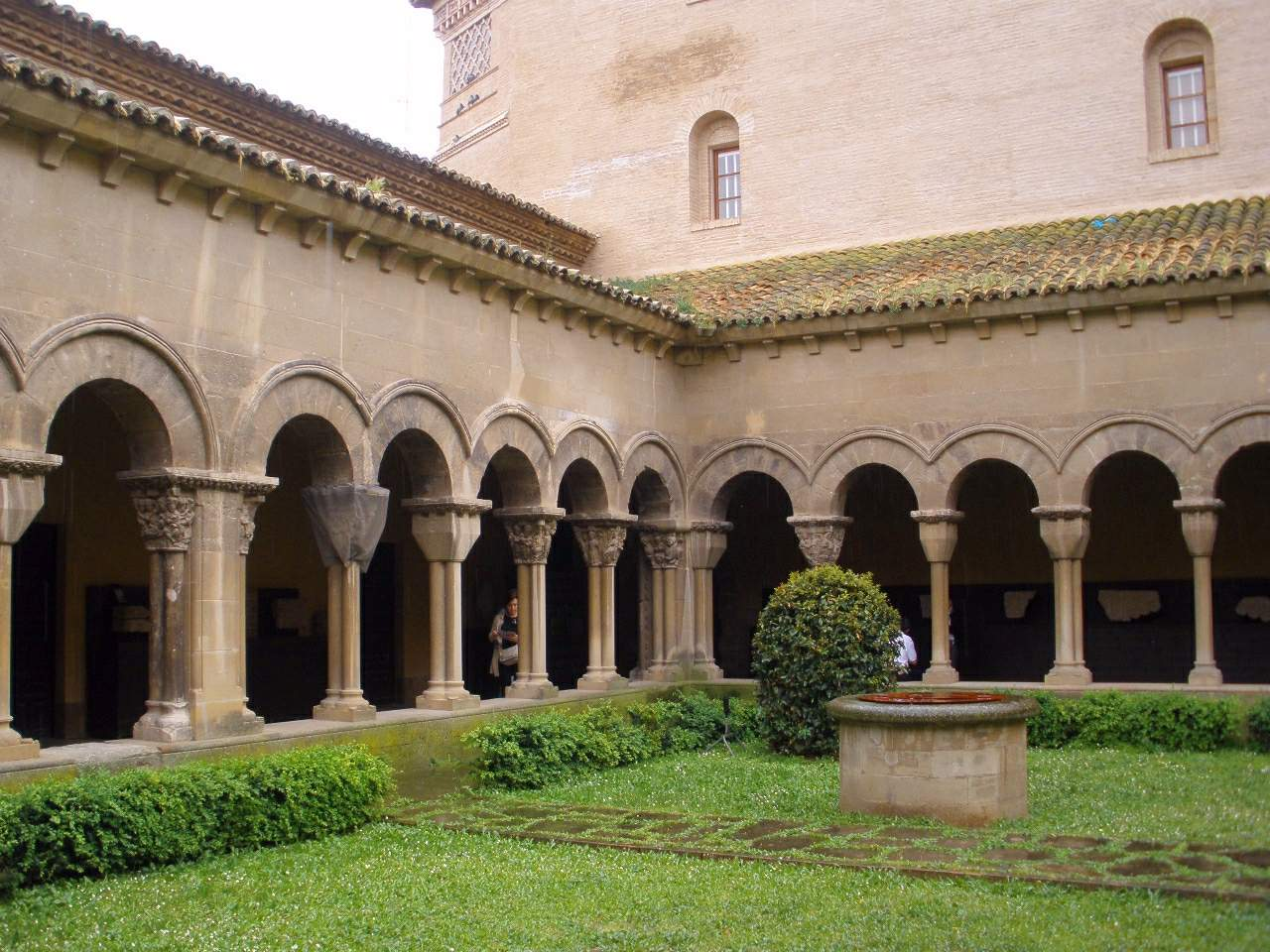

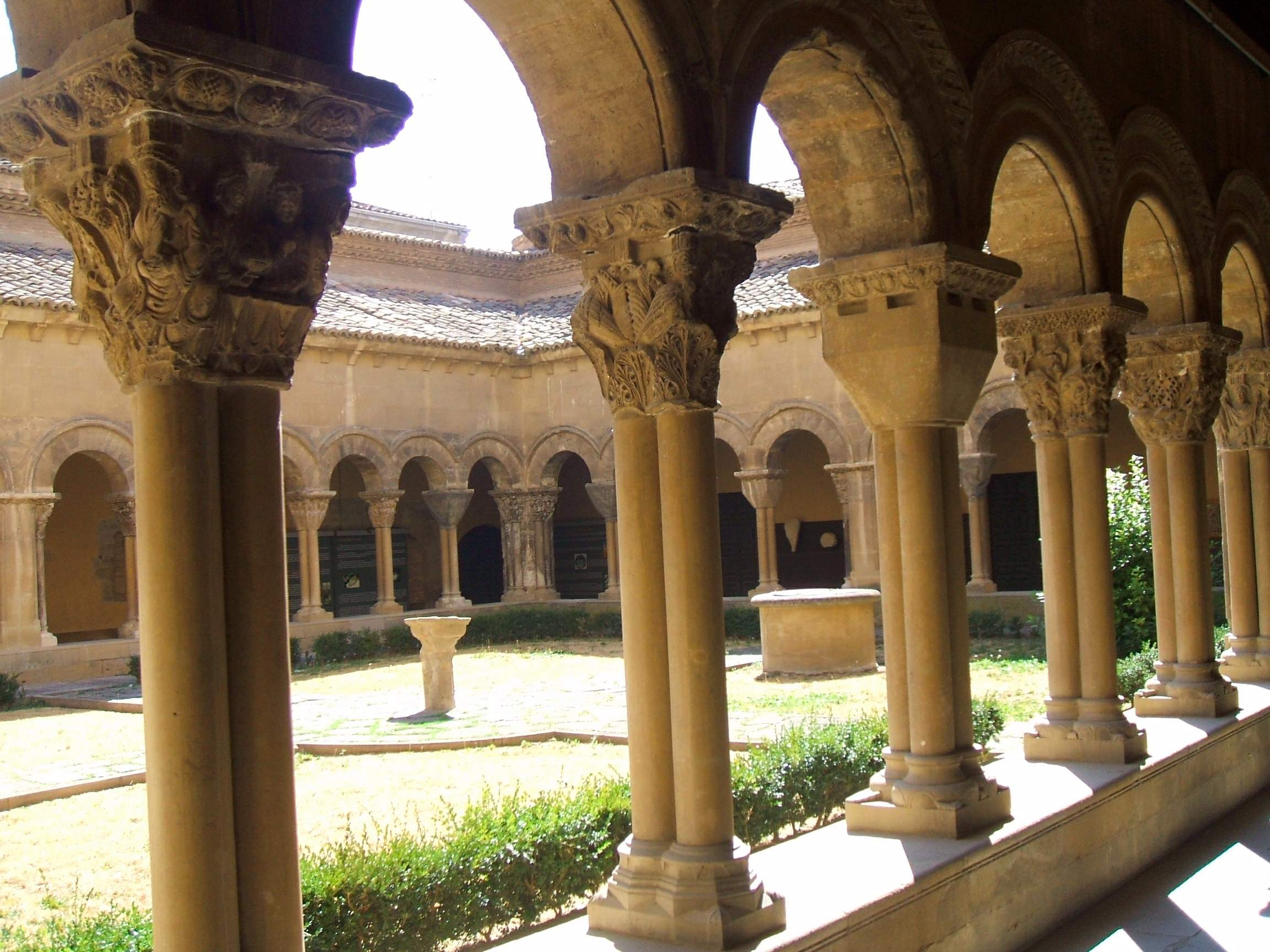

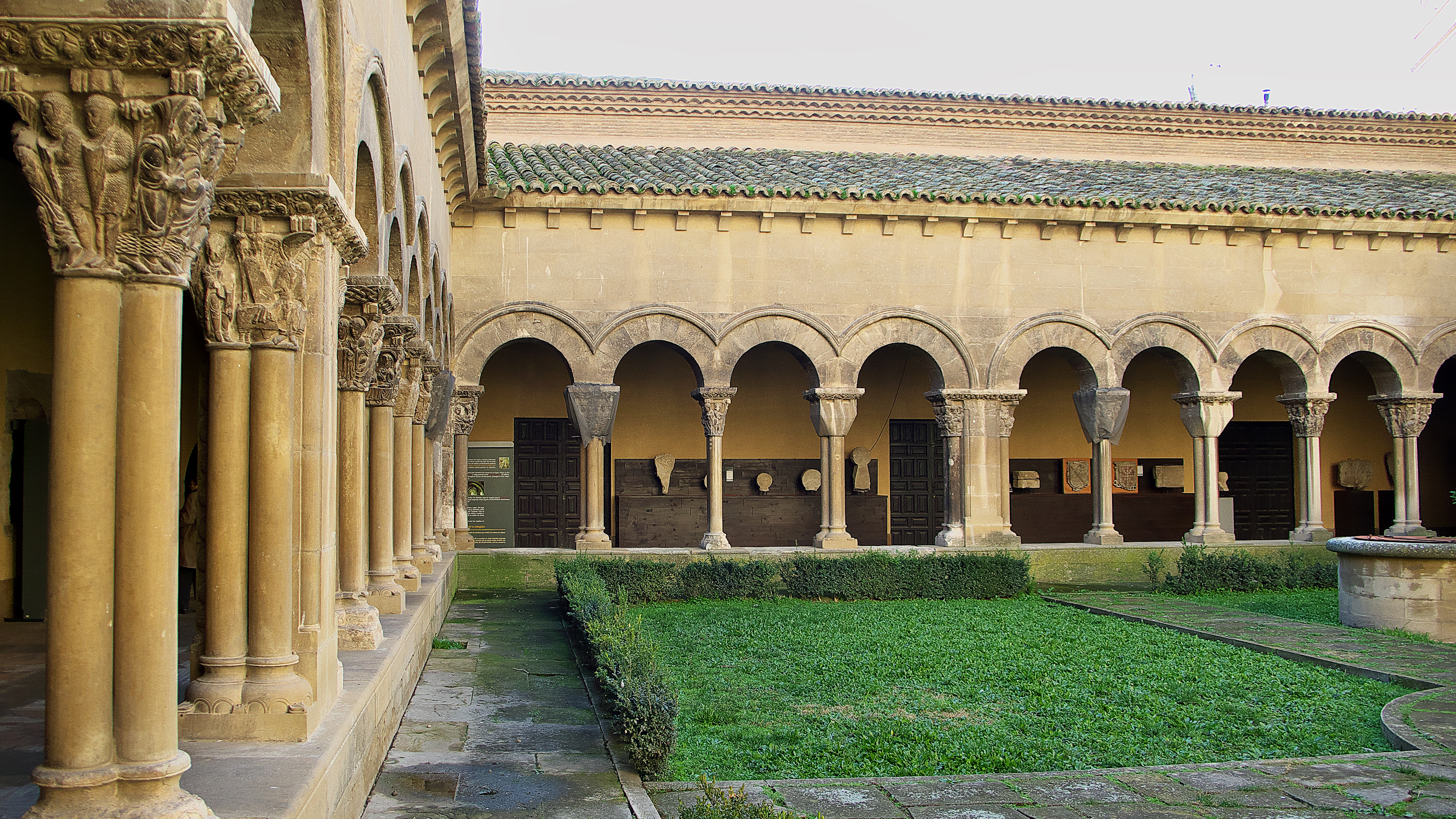

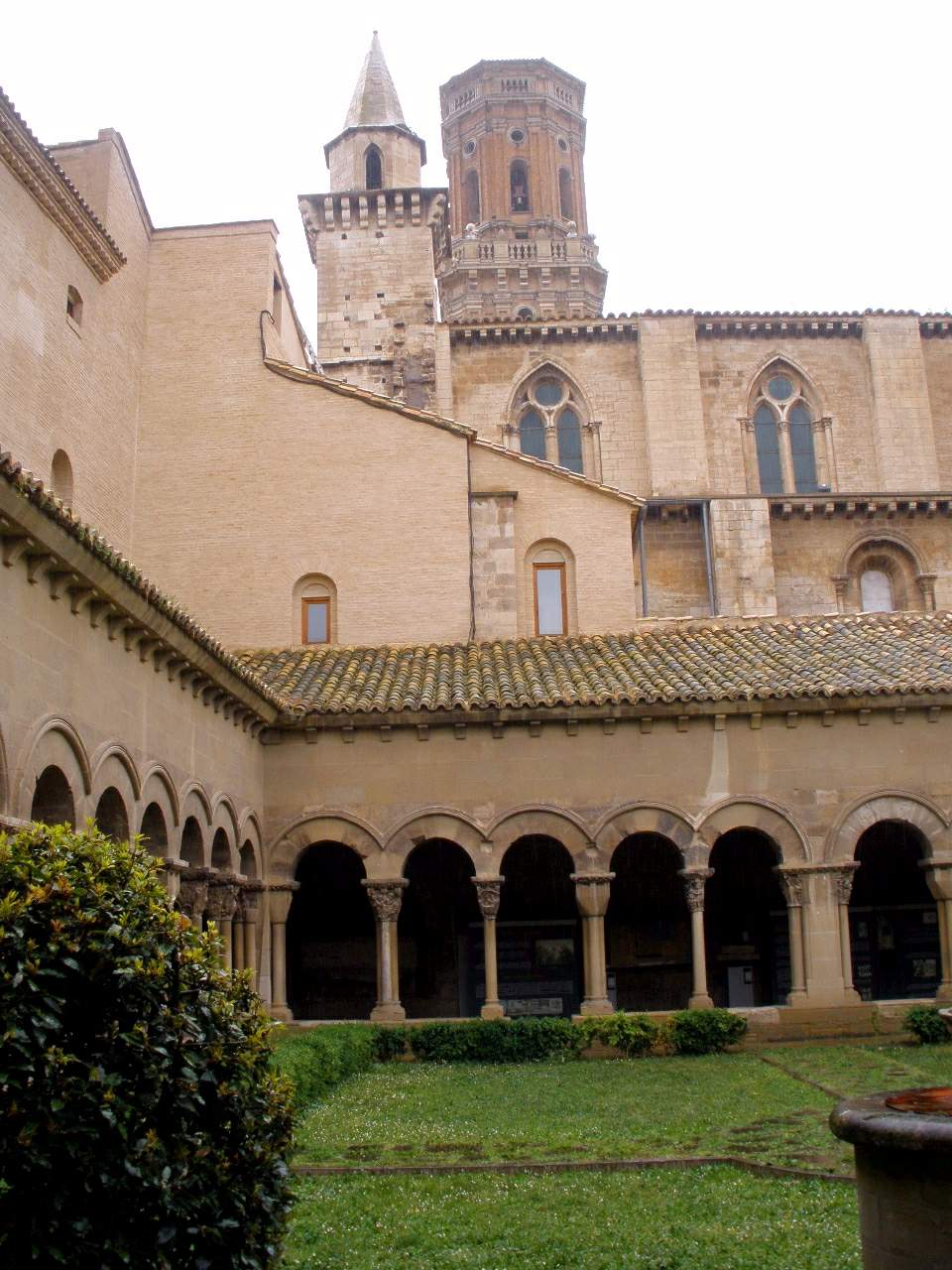

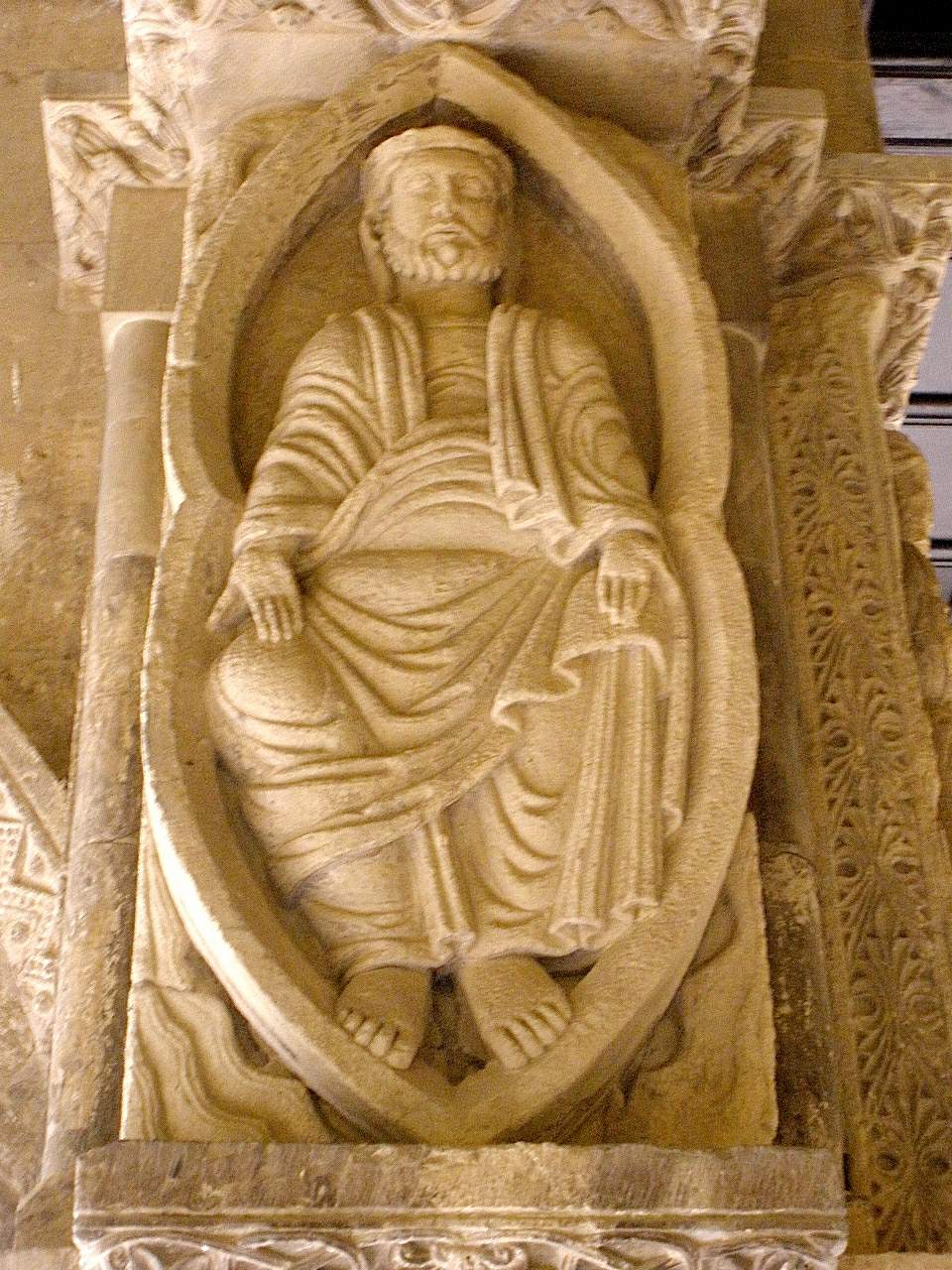

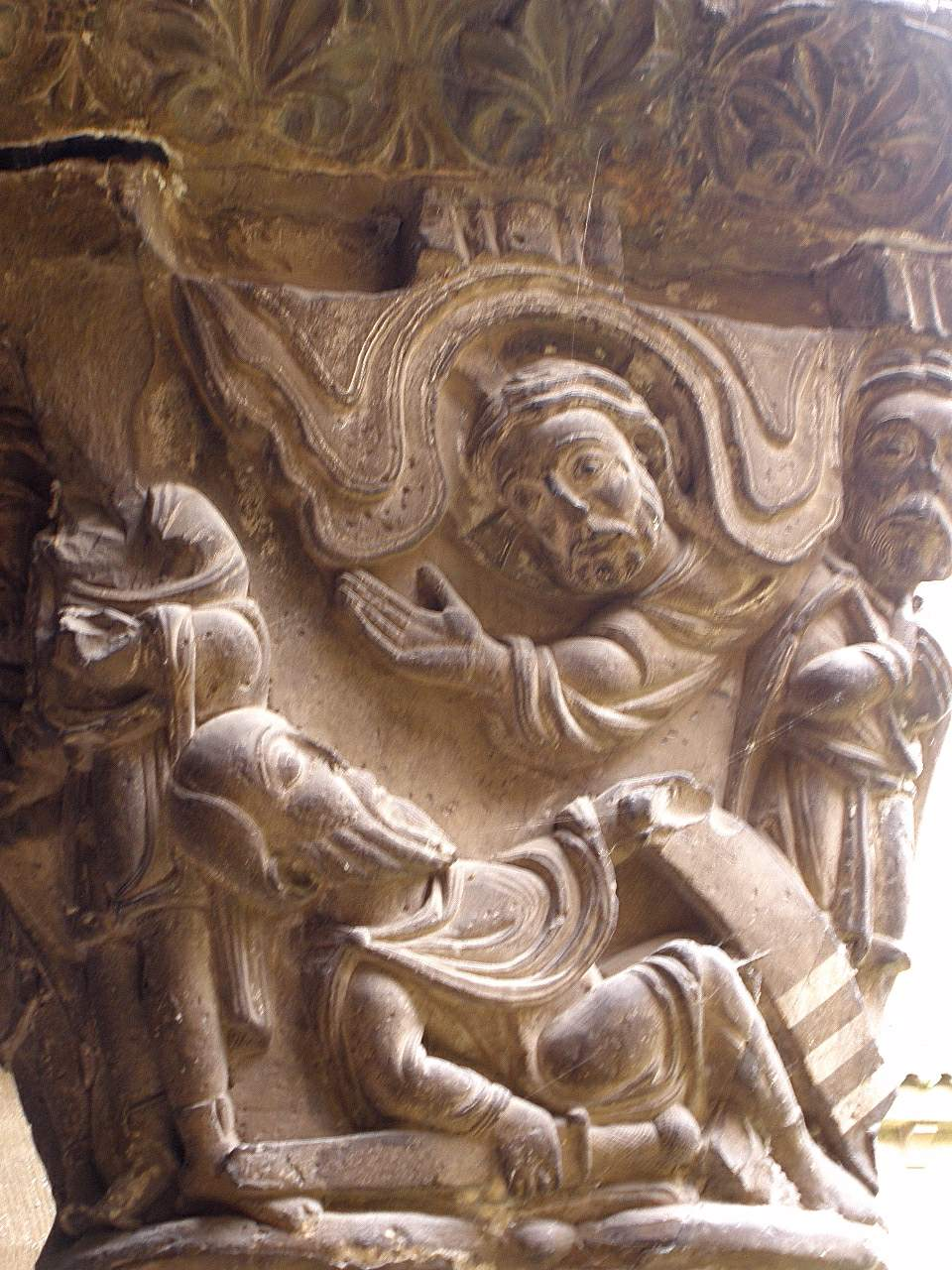

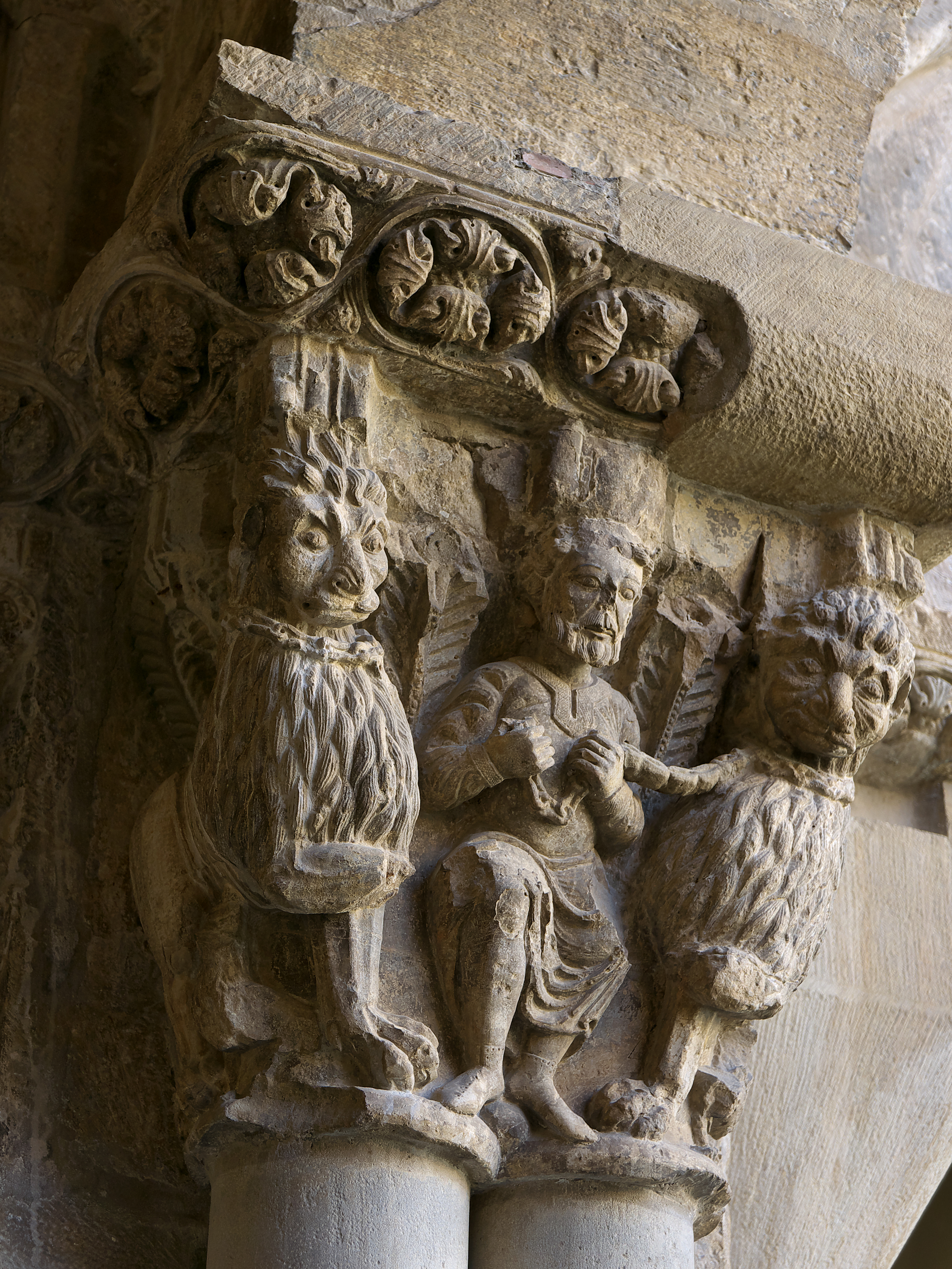

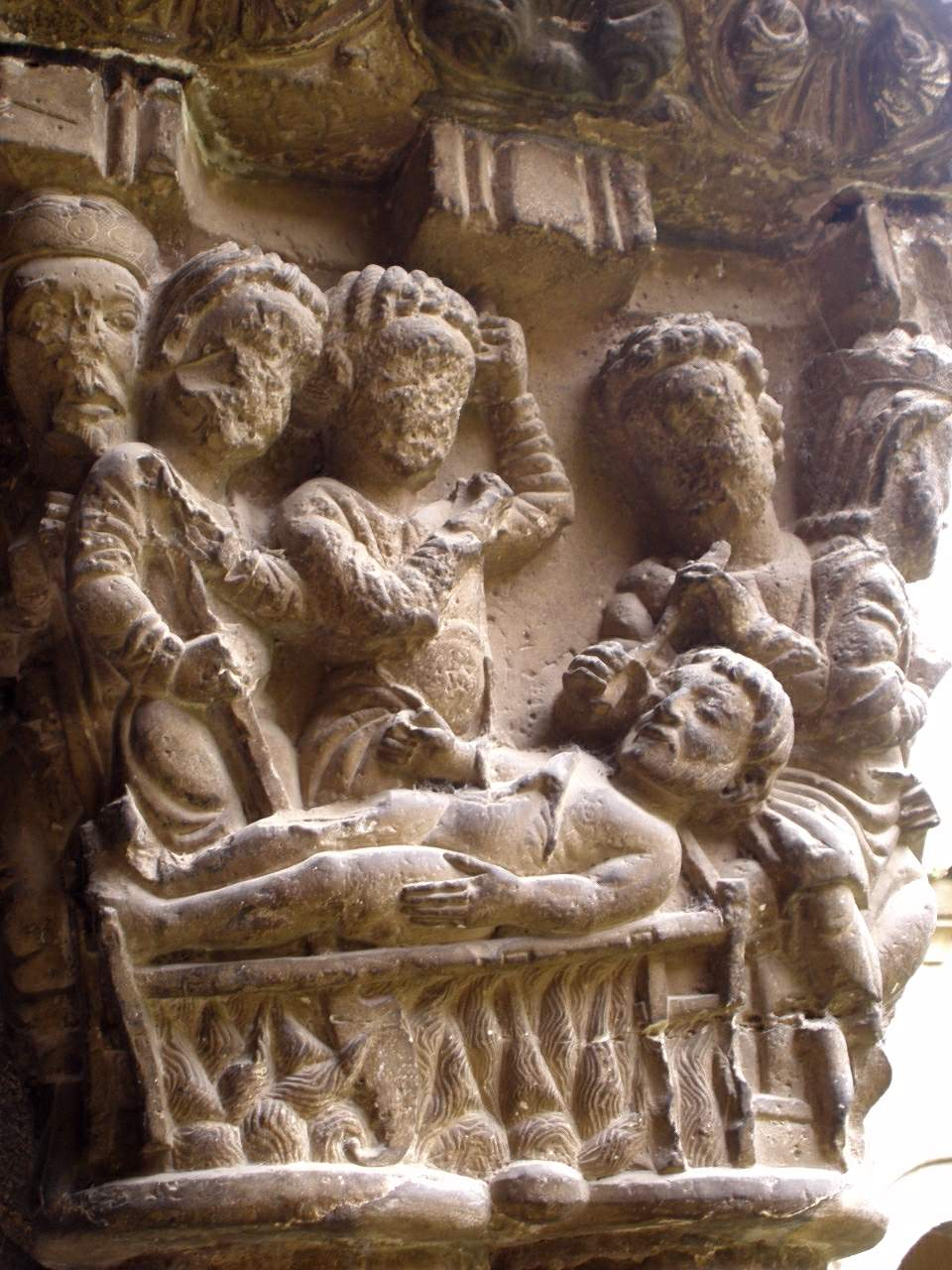

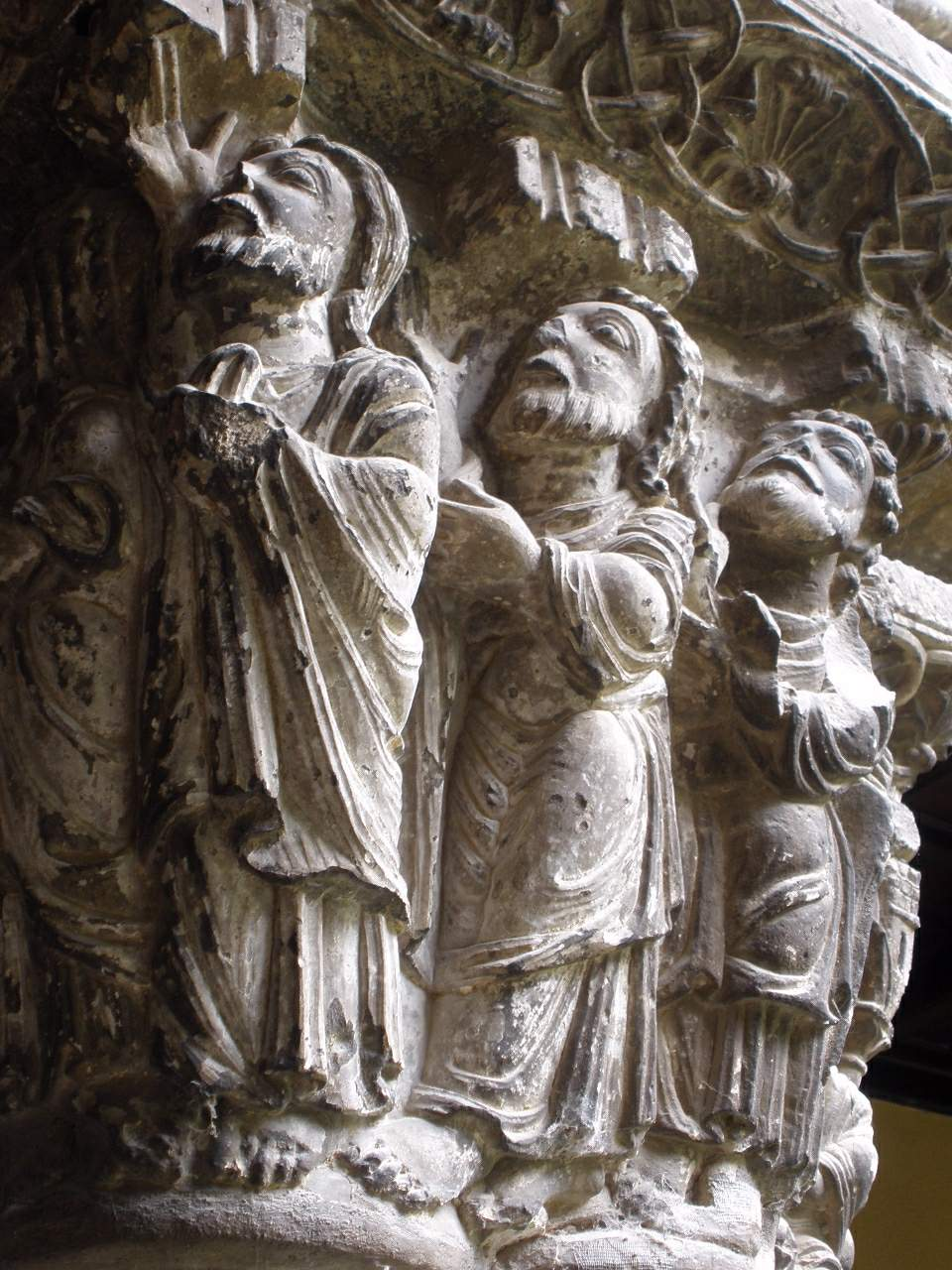

== Other points of interest ==
- In its construction, sculpted material from the mosque was reused, such as the modillions.
- More than 120 different stonemason's marks have been identified, a figure that would likely triple if the vaults had also been studied; many of the marks remain enclosed within the interior of the wall.

== See also ==
- History of Tudela
- List of cathedrals in Spain
- Santa María de la Oliva, for the architectural similarities between both works

== Bibliography ==
- Aldanondo Otamendi, Blanca; Carasusán Cermeño, Diego (2020). "El mayor infierno de la tierra está esculpido en Tudela". Pregón Siglo XXI (55): 49–52. ISSN 1696-1161.
- Martínez de Aguirre, Javier (2006). "Arquitectura medieval". La catedral de Tudela. Gobierno de Navarra, Departamento de Cultura y Turismo, Institución Príncipe de Viana. pp. 159–190. ISBN 84-235-2887-1. OCLC 85529135.
- Rivas Carmona, Jesús; García Gainza, María Concepción (dir.) (1980). Merindad de Tudela. Catálogo Monumental de Navarra. Vol. 1. Institución "Príncipe de Viana". pp. 238–294. ISBN 978-84-00-04625-5. OCLC 8708045.
- VV.AA. (2006). La catedral de Tudela. Gobierno de Navarra, Departamento de Cultura y Turismo, Institución Príncipe de Viana. ISBN 84-235-2887-1. OCLC 85529135.
