= List of battles 301–1300 =

This is a list of battles from 301 A.D. to 1300 A.D.

== 4th century ==
Year	War	Battle	Loc.	Date(s)	Description
301	War of the Eight Princes	Battle of Yangdi–Huangqiao	(China)	April—June	Sima Jiong, Sima Ying and Sima Yong defeats Sima Lun.
303	War of the Eight Princes	Siege of Luoyang	(China)	September 303—March 304	Sima Yong and Sima Ying defeats Sima Ai.
304	War of the Eight Princes	Battle of Dangyin	(China)	9 September	Sima Ying defeats Sima Yue and captures Emperor Hui of Jin.
304	War of the Eight Princes	Battle of Pingji	(China)	September	Wang Jun and Sima Teng defeats Sima Ying.
306	War of the Eight Princes	Sack of Chang'an	(China)	June	Sima Yue defeats Sima Yong and returns Emperor Hui of Jin to Luoyang.
311	Upheaval of the Five Barbarians	Battle of Ningping	(China)	May	Han-Zhao General Shi Le ambushes and annihilated the Jin army, Wang Yan executed.
311	Upheaval of the Five Barbarians	Fall of Luoyang	(China)	13—14 July	Han-Zhao capture the Jin dynasty's capital and capture Emperor Huai of Jin.
312	Civil wars of the Tetrarchy	Siege of Segusio	(Italy)	Spring	The series of wars between Constantine and Maxentius starts.
312	Civil wars of the Tetrarchy	Battle of Turin	(Italy)		Constantine defeats forces loyal to Maxentius.
312	Civil wars of the Tetrarchy	Battle of Brescia	(Italy)	Summer	Maxentius sends Ruricus to lead an attack against Constantine, only to fail.
312	Civil wars of the Tetrarchy	Battle of Verona	(Italy)		Constantine defeats Maxentius once more in an attack, Ruricus dying whilst leading it.
312	Civil wars of the Tetrarchy	Battle of the Milvian Bridge	(Italy)	28 Oct	Constantine takes control of Italy, executing Maxentius and his family after.
313	Civil wars of the Tetrarchy	Battle of Tzirallum	(Turkey)	30 April	In the eastern part of the Empire, the forces of Licinius defeat Maximinus Daia.
314	Civil wars of the Tetrarchy	Battle of Cibalae	(Croatia)		Constantine defeats Licinius.
315	Arab incursions into the Sassanian empire	Arab incursion into Pars	(Iran)		During the childhood of Shapur II, Arab nomads made several incursions into Pars, where they raided Gor and its surroundings.
316	Upheaval of the Five Barbarians	Fall of Chang'an	(China)		Han forces receives the surrender of Emperor Min of Jin; end of the Western Jin.
316	Civil wars of the Tetrarchy	Battle of Mardia	(Bulgaria)	Late 316 or early 317	Constantine again defeats Licinius, who cedes Illyricum to Constantine.
324	Civil wars of the Tetrarchy	Battle of Adrianople	(Turkey)	3 July	Constantine defeats Licinius, who flees to Byzantium.
324	Civil wars of the Tetrarchy	Battle of the Hellespont	(Turkey)	July	Flavius Julius Crispus, son of Constantine defeats the naval forces of Licinius.
324	Civil wars of the Tetrarchy	Battle of Chrysopolis	(Turkey)	18 Sep	Constantine decisively defeats Licinius, establishing his sole control over the Empire.
325	Shapur II's Arab campaign	Shapur II's Abd Al Qays campaign	(Saudi Arabia)		Shapur II led an expedition against Abd al-Qays, during which he massacred most of the tribe, Later several Abd al-Qays tribesmen were relocated by Shapur to the province of Kirman
328	Sixteen Kingdoms	Battle of Luoyang	(China)	Aug/Sep 328—21 Jan 329	Later Zhao defeats the Former Zhao and captures their emperor, Liu Yao.
c. 330		Sack of Meroë	(Sudan)		Kingdom of Axum under King Ezana sack the capital of the Kingdom of Kush, leading to Kush's collapse.
336	Sixteen Kingdoms	Battle of Pingguo	(China)	Feb	Murong Huang defeats and captures his brother, Murong Ren.
336		Battle of Oshakan	(Armenia)		Commander Vache I Mamikonian of Armenia defeats king Sanesan of Maskut.
337	Perso-Roman wars of 337-361	Siege of Nisibis	(Turkey)		Persians unsuccessfully siege Roman city.
338	Sixteen Kingdoms	Battle of Jicheng	(China)	12–16 June	Former Yan repels a Later Zhao invasion.
338	Perso-Roman wars of 337–361	Siege of Nisibis	(Turkey)	15 June—14 or 24 Aug	Shapur II besieges Nisibis for 60 days before returning to Persia.
344	Perso-Roman wars of 337–361	Battle of Singara	(Iraq)		Emperor Constantius II fights an indecisive battle against the Persian King Shapur II.
346	Perso-Roman wars of 337–361	Siege of Nisibis	(Turkey)	346—347	Persian King Shapur II again sieges the city and is repelled.
350	Perso-Roman wars of 337–361	Siege of Nisibis	(Turkey)		King Shapur II sieges Nisibis for the third time, flooding the city but ultimately being unsuccessful and retreats.
351	Roman civil war of 350–353	Battle of Mursa Major	(Croatia)	28 Sep	Emperor Constantius II defeats the usurper Magnentius.
351	Sixteen Kingdoms	Battle of Xiangguo	(China)	Nov/Dec 350—April/May 351	Later Zhao and Former Yan defeats Ran Wei. However, the last ruler of Later Zhao, Shi Zhi, is soon assassinated.
352	Sixteen Kingdoms	Battle of Liantai	(China)	17 May	Former Yan defeats Ran Wei and captures Ran Min.
353	Roman civil war of 350–353	Battle of Mons Seleucus	(France)	Aug	Final defeat of Magnentius by Constantius II.
356	Roman–Alamanni conflict and Roman–Germanic Wars	Siege of Autun	(France)		The city of Autun, Burgundy, is besieged by Alamanni forces. Julian the Apostate of Rome relieves the city, ending the siege.
356	Roman–Alamanni conflict and Roman–Germanic Wars	Battle of Durocortorum	(France)		Caesar Julian is defeated by the Alemanni.
356	Roman–Alamanni conflict and Roman–Germanic Wars	Battle of Brumath	(France)		Roman troops under Julian destroy a Germanic war band in open battle.
356	Roman–Alamanni conflict and Roman–Germanic Wars	Siege of Senonae	(France)		Germanic troops unsuccessfully besiege the city of Senonae, where Julian is staying for the winter.
357	Roman–Alamanni conflict and Roman–Germanic Wars	Battle of Strasbourg	(France)		Julian expels the Alamanni from the Rhineland.
359	Perso-Roman wars of 337–361	Battle of Amida	(Turkey)		Sasanians capture Amida from the Romans.
360	Perso-Roman wars of 337–361	Siege of Singara	(Iraq)		Sasanians take Singara.
363	Julian's Persian expedition	Battle of Ctesiphon	(Iraq)	29 May	Emperor Julian defeats Shapur II outside the walls of the Persian capital, but is unable to take the city, leading to an ultimate disaster on the retreat back to Roman territory.
363	Julian's Persian expedition	Battle of Samarra	(Iraq)	June	Julian fights the Sasanians and is subsequently killed in battle. Though indecisive, the battle leads to massive losses for the Roman Empire through a forced peace treaty.
366	Procopius' Rebellion	Battle of Thyatira	(Turkey)		The army of the Roman Emperor Valens defeats the usurper Procopius.
367	Roman–Alamanni conflict and Roman–Germanic Wars	Battle of Solicinium	(Germany)		Romans under Emperor Valentinian I defeat yet another Alemanni incursion.
369	Huan Wen's Northern Expeditions	Battle of Fangtou	(China)	March/April—9 Nov	Former Yan and Former Qin defeats Eastern Jin forces led by Huan Wen.
370	Conquest of Former Yan by Former Qin	Battle of Luchuan	(China)	Nov	Former Qin forces led by Wang Meng defeat Former Yan.
373		Battle of the Tanais River	(Russia)		The Huns defeat the Alans near the Don, beginning the great period of the Germanic migrations.
377	Gothic War and Roman–Germanic Wars	Battle of the Willows	(Bulgaria)		Roman troops fight an inconclusive battle against the Goths.
377	Gothic War and Roman–Germanic Wars	Battle of Dibaltum	(Bulgaria)		Goths, Alans and Huns defeat Romans.
378	Gothic War and Roman–Germanic Wars	Battle of Adrianople	(Turkey)	9 Aug	The Thervings under Fritigern defeat and kill the Eastern Roman Emperor Valens.
378	Roman–Germanic Wars	Battle of Argentovaria	(France)		The Western Emperor Gratianus is victorious over the Alamanni, yet again.
380	Gothic War and Roman–Germanic Wars	Battle of Thessalonica	(Greece)		The Goths under Fritigern fight and defeat a Roman army under Emperor Theodosius I.
383	Sixteen Kingdoms	Battle of Feishui	(China)	30 Nov	Fu Jiān is defeated by the Jin commander Xie An. The kingdom of the Former Qin collapses shortly thereafter.
388	Roman civil war	Battle of the Save	(Croatia)		Emperor Theodosius I defeats the usurper Magnus Maximus. Also known as the Battle of Poetovio.
394	Roman civil war	Battle of the Frigidus	(Slovenia)	5–6 Sep	The Christian Roman Emperor Theodosius I defeats and kills the last Pagan-tolerant usurper Eugenius and his Frankish general Arbogast.
395	Sixteen Kingdoms	Battle of Canhe Slope	(China)	8 Dec	Part of the Later Yan campaign into Northern Wei territory; crushing defeat for the Later Yan forces.
397	Sixteen Kingdoms	Battle of Baisi	(China)	23–24 March	Northern Wei defeats the Later Yan, driving them out of the Central Plains.

== 5th century ==
Year	War	Battle	Loc.	Date(s)	Description
402	Gothic War and Roman–Germanic Wars	Battle of Pollentia	(Italy)	6 April	Romans under Flavius Stilicho win a small victory against the Visigoths under Alaric.
403	Gothic War and Roman–Germanic Wars	Battle of Verona	(Italy)	June	Stilicho defeats the Visigoths under Alaric, forcing them out of Italy.
405	War of Radagaisus	Siege of Florence	(Italy)		Stilcho defends city from the Goths, but Florence is nearly destroyed.
406	War of Radagaisus and Roman–Germanic Wars	Battle of Faesulae	(Italy)		Stilicho defeats Visigoths and Vandals under Radagaisus.
406	Vandal–Frankish war	Battle of Mainz	(Germany)		An army of Vandals, Suevi, and Alans defeats the Frankish federation.
409	Fall of the Roman Empire	Battle of Ostia	(Italy)		Visigoths under Alaric I defeat Romans.
409	Liu Yu's Northern Expeditions	Battle of Linqu	(China)		Eastern Jin decisively defeats Southern Yan.
409	Liu Yu's Northern Expeditions	Siege of Guanggu	(China)		Jin dynasty conquer Southern Yan
410	Fall of the Roman Empire	Sack of Rome	(Italy)	24 Aug	The Visigoths under Alaric sack Rome.
413	Fall of the Roman Empire	Siege of Massilia	(France)		Visigoths under Ataulf are defeated by Romans under Bonifacius while trying to siege Roman city. They make peace with Rome soon after.
419	Fall of the Roman Empire	Battle of the Nervasos Mountains	(Spain)		Suebi under Hermeric allied with Romans in Hispania defeat coalition between the Vandals and Alans.
422	Fall of the Roman Empire	Battle of Tarraco	(Spain)		The Vandals defeat the Western Roman Empire.
425	Gothic revolt of Theodoric I	Siege of Arles	(France)		The Roman general Aëtius defeats the Visigoths under Theodoric I.
428	Fall of the Roman Empire	Battle of Mérida	(Spain)		Vandals defeat Suebi.
430	Fall of the Roman Empire	Siege of Hippo Regius	(Algeria)	June 430—Aug 431	Vandals under Genseric establish a foothold in Africa, strategically defeating Rome. Saint Augustine dies during the siege.
431	Fall of the Roman Empire	Battle of Helena	(France)		Romans defeat Franks.
432	Fall of the Roman Empire	Battle of Rimini	(Italy)		The Roman general Aëtius is defeated by his rival Count Boniface, who is killed.
436	Gothic War	Battle of Narbonne	(France)	436—437	Aëtius again defeats the Visigoths under Theodoric I.
439	Fall of the Roman Empire	Battle of Carthage	(Tunisia)	19 Oct	Romans lose Carthage to the Vandals.
439	Fall of the Roman Empire	Battle of Toulouse	(France)		Visigoths led by Theodoric I defeat Romans under General Litorius, who is killed.
447	Fall of the Roman Empire	Battle of the Utus	(Bulgaria)		Hunnic victory, led by Attila, over Roman forces in what is today Bulgaria.
445	Fall of the Roman Empire	Battle of Vicus Helena	(France)	c. 445—450	Romans under Aëtius defeated the Franks under Chlodio.
450	Legends of the Germanic heroic age	Battle of Finnsburg	(Netherlands)		Possibly mythical battle where Frisians allied with Jutes fight and are defeated by Danes in the Germanic heroic age. Frisian King Finn and Danish Prince Hnæf both supposedly died in combat.
451		Battle of Avarayr	(Iran)	26 May	Forces of Yazdegerd II annihilate the Christian Armenian rebels led by Saint Vartan.
451	Fall of the Roman Empire	Battle of Châlons	(France)	20 June	An alliance under Visigothic king Theodoric I and Romans under Aëtius repulse the attack of Attila the Hun and his allies. Theodoric is killed in the battle.
452	Fall of the Roman Empire	Sack of Aquileia	(Italy)	18 July	Aquileia is razed to the ground by the forces of Attila the Hun.
454	Germanic-Hunnic Wars	Battle of Nedao			A Germanic alliance under the leadership of the Ostrogoths and the Gepids breaks Hunnic power in Europe.
455	Roman–Germanic Wars	Sack of Rome	(Italy)	2–6 June	The Vandals sack Rome during their campaign against Emperor Petronius Maximus, looting the city for 14 days.
455	Anglo-Saxon settlement of Britain	Battle of Aylesford	(England)		Britons and Anglo-Saxons battle in Kent, victory is unclear.
456	Fall of the Roman Empire	Battle of Corsica	(France)		Romans repel Vandal attempt to annex Corsica.
456	Fall of the Roman Empire	Battle of Órbigo	(Spain)		Theodoric II, king of the Visigoths defeats the Suevi, sacks their capital, and conquers Spain.
457	Fall of the Roman Empire	Battle of Garigliano	(Italy)		Romans under Majorian defeat the Vandals.
457	Fall of the Roman Empire	Battle of Campi Cannini	(Italy)		Romans under Majorian defeats the Alemanni.
458	Gothic War and Fall of the Roman Empire	Battle of Arelate	(France)	Late 458	The Roman Emperor Majorian, with the support of Aegidius and Nepotianus, defeats the Visigoths at Arlate.
458	Fall of the Roman Empire	Battle of Toulouse	(France)		The Roman Emperor Majorian defeats the Visigoths.
461	Fall of the Roman Empire	Battle of Cartagena	(Spain)		A Vandal fleet surprises and destroys the Roman fleet.
461	Fall of the Roman Empire	Battle of Bergamo	(Italy)		Romans under General Ricimer defeat Roman followers of emperor Majorian.
463	Roman–Germanic Wars	Battle of Orleans	(France)		Kingdom of Soissons and Alans led by Aegidius defeat Visigoths under Theodoric II.
465	Anglo-Saxon settlement of Britain	Battle of Wippedesfleot	(England)		The Saxons under Hengest battle the Britons, victory is undecided.
468	Fall of the Roman Empire	Battle of Bolia	(Hungary)		Ostrogoths defeat a coalition of Gepids, Heruli, Rugii, Sarmatians, Sciri, Suebi and the Roman Empire.
468	Vandal War and Fall of the Roman Empire	Battle of Cape Bon	(Tunisia)		Vandals decisively defeat large joint effort by Western Roman Empire and Eastern Roman Empire to retake Carthage.
469	Fall of the Roman Empire	Battle of Déols	(France)		Visigoths defeat Bretons.
471	Fall of the Roman Empire	Battle of Arles	(France)		Visigoths defeat the Western Roman Empire.
472	Fall of the Roman Empire	Siege of Rome	(Italy)	March—July	Ricimer, having fallen out with his choice for Roman Emperor, allies with the Burgundians and Germans under Odoacer, defeats and kills the Roman Emperor Anthemius.
474	Hephthalite-Sasanian Wars	Battle of Gurgan	(Iran)		Hephthalites ambush and capture Sassanian King Peroz I
476	Fall of the Roman Empire	Battle of Ravenna	(Italy)	2–4 Sep	The Germanic foederati led by Odoacer decisively defeat the Western Roman Empire and depose Emperor Romulus Augustulus. Western Roman Empire dissolved.
484	Hephthalite–Sasanian War of 484	Battle of Herat	(Afghanistan)		Hephthalite Empire decisively defeats the Sasanian Empire and kills King Peroz I.
485	Anglo-Saxon settlement of Britain	Battle of Mercredesburne	(England)		Saxons under Aelle defeat British defenders.
486	Franco-Roman War of 486	Battle of Soissons	(France)		Clovis I defeats Syagrius and gains the Domain of Soissons.
489	Conquest of Italy by Theodoric the Great	Battle of Isonzo	(Italy)	28 Aug	Odoacer fights the Ostrogoths under Theodoric the Great, ending in the Italian troops' defeat.
489		Battle of Sirmium	(Serbia)	Aug	King Theodoric the Great of the Ostrogoths defeats king Thraustila of the Gepids.
489	Conquest of Italy by Theodoric the Great	Battle of Verona	(Italy)	30 Sep	Odoacer fights the Ostrogoths near Verona, and is defeated a second time.
490	Conquest of Italy by Theodoric the Great	Siege of Ravenna	(Italy)	Late 490—5 March 493	Odoacer holds out against Theodoric the Great until the Ostrogothic king is able to enforce a naval blockade on the city. Several days after a truce is negotiated to end the siege, Theodoric kills Odoacer with his own hands.
492	Isaurian War	Battle of Cotyaeum	(Turkey)		Byzantine army under John the Scythian defeats Isaurians under Longinus of Cardala.
496	First Franco-Visigothic war (496–498)	Battle of Tolbiac	(Germany)		Franks under Clovis I defeat the Alamanni, killing their king.
497	First Hunnic War	Sack of Kausambi	(India)		Alchon Huns sack the central Indian city of Kosambi.
498	First Hunnic War	First Battle of Eran	(India)		Alchon Huns decisively defeat the Gupta Empire and annex Malwa.

== 6th century ==
Year	War	Battle	Loc.	Date(s)	Description
502	Anastasian War	Siege of Theodosiopolis	(Turkey)	Aug	Sasanians under Kavadh I take ungarrisoned Byzantine city.
502	Anastasian War	Siege of Martyropolis	(Turkey)		Sasanians take Byzantine city.
502	Anastasian War	Siege of Amida	(Turkey)	Oct 502—Jan 503	Byzantine city holds out for three months without reinforcements against Persian siege led by Kavadh I before they eventually take the city until the Byzantines ransom it back in a treaty two years later.
505	Basus War	Battle of Zanaeb	(Saudi Arabia)		Taghlib victory in Zanaeb Valley in Najd.
505	Basus War	Battle of Darya	(Saudi Arabia)		Taghlib victory in Darya near Al-Qassim Province.
506	Campaigns of Clovis I	Battle of Strasbourg	(France)		The Franks under Clovis I defeats the Alemanni.
506		Battle of Zhongli	(China)	506-507	Northern Wei invaded the Liang dynasty, but the attack failed.
507	Franco–Gothic War	Battle of Vouillé	(France)		The Franks under Clovis I defeat the Visigoths under Alaric II decisively, gaining Gallia Aquitania. Clovis kills Alaric in single combat.
510	First Hunnic War	Second Battle of Eran	(India)		Alchon Huns defeat the Guptas and temporarily conquer the province of Malwa.
512	War of the Visigothic Succession	Battle of Barcelona	(Spain)		The Ostrogothic Kingdom under Ibbas defeats Visigothic rebels under Gesalec.
518	Anglo-Saxon conquest of Britain	Battle of Mons Badonicus	(United Kingdom)		Or Battle of Mynydd Baddon. British forces defeat the Saxons decisively, ending their advance into British lands. Later connected to King Arthur.
520	Second Hunnic War	Sack of Pataliputra	(India)		Alchon Huns under Mihirakula sack and devastate the capital of the Gupta Empire, leading to the permanent decline of both the Gupta Empire and Pataliputra as a city.
522	Basus War	Battle of the Shaved Heads	(Saudi Arabia)		Banu Bakr soldiers shave their heads so that they would know each other on the battlefield, Banu Bakr defeat Taghlib
524	Invasion of Burgundy	Battle of Vézeronce	(France)	25 June	Burgundians and Ostrogoths under Theodoric the Great defeat the Merovingian Franks.
525		Battle on the Rhine	(Netherlands)		The army of king Theudebert I of Austrasia and a king in Frisia defeat an army of Danes.
525	Aksumite invasion of Himyar	siege of sanaa	(Yemen)		Kingdom of Aksum under Kaleb of Axum annexes the Himyarite Kingdom of Dhu Nuwas.
528	Iberian War	Battle of Thannuris	(Syria)	Summer	Sasanians defeat Byzantines under Belisarius, but take heavy losses.
528	Second Hunnic War	Battle of Sondani	(India)		Alliance of Indian rulers defeat the Alchon Huns, who retreat out of India.
530	Iberian War	Battle of Dara	(Turkey)	June	Byzantine commander Belisarius, in alliance with Heruli and the Huns, defeats Sasanian Persians in Turkey.
530	Iberian War	Battle of Satala	(Turkey)	Summer	Byzantines under Sittas and Dorotheus defeat attacking Persians under Mermeroes.
530		Banu Asad Revolt against Hujr of kinda	(Saudi Arabia)		Banu Asad Revolt against Kingdom of Kinda and kill king Hujr.
530		Imru' al-Qais' attack on Asad tribe	(Saudi Arabia)		Imru' al-Qais with the help of Taghlib tribe exacts revenge on Banu Asad for killing his father "Hujr" killing many of them, but he fails to regain control of the throne of his father
530		Battle on the Ice of Lake Vänern	(Sweden)		Between Eadgils and his uncle King Onela of Sweden with the help of Beowulf. This event appears in several Norse sagas and in the Anglo-Saxon epic Beowulf.
531	Iberian War	Battle of Callinicum	(Syria)	19 April	A Sasanian army defeats a Byzantine force in Syria, but with heavy losses on both sides.
531	Iberian War	Siege of Martyropolis	(Turkey)	Autumn	Sasanians withdraw from attack on Byzantine city, last battle of the Iberian War.
531		Battle of the Unstrut River	(Germany)		Frankish King Theuderic I defeats Thuringian King Hermanafrid and conquers Thuringia
532		Battle of Autun	(France)		Frankish kings Childebert I and Chlothar I defeat the Burgundians and conquer their territory.
533	Vandalic War	Battle of Ad Decimum	(Tunisia)	13 Sep	Belisarius defeats the Vandals under Gelimer near Carthage.
533	Vandalic War	Battle of Tricamarum	(Tunisia)	15 Dec	Belisarius again defeats the Vandals near Carthage, ending Vandal rule in North Africa.
534	Byzantine–Moorish wars	Battle of Mammes	(Tunisia)		Byzantine general Solomon defeats the Moorish rebels and secures control of Byzacena.
535	Byzantine–Moorish wars	Battle of Mount Bourgaon	(Tunisia)	Summer	Byzantine general Solomon defeats the Moorish rebels and secures control of Byzacena.
536	Gothic War	Siege of Naples	(Italy)	Oct—Nov	Byzantines under Belisarius take city from the Ostrogoths.
537	Matter of Britain	Battle of Camlann	(United Kingdom)		King Arthur killed, perhaps mythical, by Mordred.
537	Byzantine–Moorish wars	Battle of Scalas Veteres	(Tunisia)	Spring	Germanus defeats rebel African army.
537		Battle of Shayuan	(China)		Western Wei dynasty defeats the Eastern Wei dynasty
538	Gothic War	Siege of Rome	(Italy)		Unsuccessful siege of Rome by the Ostrogoths, Byzantine defenders under Belisarius remain victorious.
538	Gothic War	Siege of Ariminum	(Italy)	March–July	Belisarius broke the Ostrogothic siege without a fight against a numerically superior force with the use of psychological warfare.
538	Gothic War	Siege of Urbinus	(Italy)		Belisarius continues to expand at the expense of Ostrogoths.
540	Byzantine–Moorish wars	Battle of Babosis	(Algeria)		Byzantine general Solomon defeats the Moorish rebels of the Aurès Mountains region and secures control of Numidia and Mauretania Sitifensis.
540	Byzantine–Moorish wars	Battle of Zerboule	(Algeria)		Byzantine general Solomon defeats the Moorish rebels of the Aurès Mountains region and secures control of Numidia and Mauretania Sitifensis.
540		Siege of Banavasi	(India)		Chalukyas under Kirttivarman I defeat Kadamba dynasty and annex their capital of Banavasi.
541	Lazic War	Siege of Petra	(Georgia (country))	Feb—June	Sasasians under Khosrow I capture Byzantine fortress.
541	Gothic War	Siege of Verona	(Italy)	Winter	Ostrogoths under Totila defend city against larger Byzantine army.
542	Gothic War	Battle of Faventia	(Italy)	Spring	Ostrogoths under Totila defeat Byzantine army.
542	Gothic War	Battle of Mucellium	(Italy)		Ostrogoths defeat Byzantine army.
543	Lazic War	Battle of Anglon	(Armenia)		A Byzantine invasion of Sasanian Armenia is defeated by a small force under Nabedes.
544	Lazic War	Siege of Edessa	(Turkey)	March—April	Sasanians under Khosrow I abandon siege of Byzantine city of Edessa, which pays them 5 centenaria of gold.
544	Byzantine–Moorish wars	Battle of Cillium	(Tunisia)		Byzantine General Solomon killed in battle by a coalition of Berber tribes.
545	Byzantine–Moorish wars	Battle of Thacia	(Tunisia)	Autumn	Stotzas mortally wounded by Byzantine general John.
546	Byzantine–Moorish wars	Battle of Sufetula	(Tunisia)	Late 546 or early 547	Byzantine general John Troglita defeats the Moorish rebels under Antalas.
547	Byzantine–Moorish wars	Battle of Marta	(Tunisia)	Late summer	John Troglita is defeated by a coalition of Tripolitanian Moors.
548	Byzantine–Moorish wars	Battle of the Fields of Cato	(Tunisia)	Summer	John Troglita defeats the last Moorish coalition and suppresses the Moorish revolt.
550	Lazic War	Siege of Petra	(Georgia (country))	Summer 550—Spring 551	Byzantines recapture city and dismantle its walls.
551	Gothic War	Battle of Sena Gallica	(Italy)	Autumn	A Byzantine naval squadron defeats the Ostrogoth fleet decisively.
552	Gothic War	Battle of Taginae	(Italy)	July	Byzantines under Narses defeat Ostrogoths under Totila, who dies in battle.
552		Battle of Asfeld	(Croatia) , (Serbia) or (Bosnia and Herzegovina)		Longobards under King Audoin defeat the Gepids under Thurisind, who is killed.
552		Battle of Huaihuang	(China)		Göktürk Khaganate decisively defeats Rouran Khaganate whose chieftain Anagui commits suicide.
553	Gothic War	Battle of Mons Lactarius	(Italy)	Oct 552 or early 553	Byzantines under Narses defeat the Ostrogoths under Teia, ending Ostrogoth resistance.
553	Lazic War	Battle of Telephis-Ollaria	(Georgia (country))		Sasanians defeat Byzantines.
554	Gothic War	Battle of the Volturnus	(Italy)	Oct	Byzantines under Narses defeat the Franks and Alamanni decisively.
554		Yawm Halima ("Day of Halima")	(Syria)	June	The Ghassanids under al-Harith ibn Jabalah defeat the Lakhmids under al-Mundhir III ibn al-Nu'man, who is killed.
554	Lazic War	Siege of Onoguris	(Georgia (country))	554 or 555	Sasanians decisively defeat Byzantines and force them to retreat from the area and abandon Archaeopolis, which they subsequently raze.
555	Lazic War	Siege of Phasis	(Georgia (country))	July 555—June 556	Byzantines defeat Sasanian siege of town.
556	Anglo-Saxon settlement of Britain	Battle of Beran Byrig	(England)		West Saxons under Cynric and his son Ceawlin defeat Britons.
559	Byzantine-Kutrigurs war 558–559	Battle of Melantias	(Turkey)	March	Byzantines under Belisarius defeat the Kutrigurs 20 kilometres (12 mi) west of Constantinople.
560	Expansion of the Uí Néill dynasty	Battle of Cúl Dreimhne	(Republic of Ireland)		Uí Néill defeat King Diarmait mac Cerbaill.
563	Hephthalite–Sasanian Wars	Battle of Gol-Zarriun	(Uzbekistan)		Also known as the Battle of Bukhara - Sasanians under King Khosrow I allied with the Göktürks decisively defeat the Hephthalite Empire, which dissolved into smaller kingdoms in the aftermath.
568		Battle of Wibbandun	(England)		Ceawlin of Wessex and Cutha defeat Æthelberht of Kent.
568	Dahis and al-Ghabra	Tayy raid on Banu Abs	(Saudi Arabia)		Banu Abs repel the attack of Tayy tribe with the help of Antarah ibn Shaddad
570		Battle of 'Ayn Ubagh	(Iraq)		The Ghassanids under al-Mundhir III ibn al-Harith defeat the Lakhmids under Qabus ibn al-Mundhir.
570	Aksumite–Persian wars	Battle of Hadhramaut	(Yemen)		Sasanians defeat the Kingdom of Aksum and kill King Masruq ibn Abraha.
570	Aksumite–Persian wars	Siege of Sanaa	(Yemen)		Sasanians take Yemen from Aksum.
570		The day of the elephant	(Saudi Arabia)		the army of Abraha is defeated
571	Anglo-Saxon settlement of Britain	Battle of Bedcanford	(England)		Cuthwulf of Wessex defeated the Celtic Britons and took several towns.
573		Battle of Arfderydd	(Wales)		Welsh battle between Christian and non-Christian forces; Gwenddoleu dies.
574	Aksumite–Persian wars spillovers	Battle of al-Safqa	(Saudi Arabia)		Khosrow I sent forces to attack Banu Tamim as retribution for raiding Haudha ibn Ali's caravan that was carrying weapons and supplies for Sasanian Yemen , a large number of people from the Banu Tamim tribe were massacred.
575		Sack of al-Hirah	(Iraq)		The Ghassanids under al-Harith ibn Jabalah sack the Lakhmid capital, al-Hirah.
576	Byzantine–Sasanian War of 572–591	Battle of Melitene (576)	(Turkey)		Byzantine victory
577	Anglo-Saxon settlement of Britain	Battle of Deorham	(England)		West Saxons defeats the Briton Celts in Wiltshire, England.
580		Battle of Shi'b Jabala	(Saudi Arabia)		Banu Amir victory, evacuation of the last Kindite kings from Najd to South Arabia.
582		Battle of Gaoyu Plain	(China)	May	The Sui dynasty with 30,000 infantry and cavalry defeat Apa Qaghan of the Göktürks.
584	Anglo-Saxon settlement of Britain	Battle of Fethan Leag	(England)		Ceawlin of Wessex decisively defeats Celtic Britons in modern-day Stoke Lyne, although his son Cutha is killed.
585	Fijar Wars	yawm Sharab battle	(Saudi Arabia)		Quraysh defeats Hawazin.
585	Fijar Wars	yawm al-Ḥurayra battle	(Saudi Arabia)		Hawazin defeats Quraysh, Peace was restored after a few further skirmishes.
586	Byzantine–Sasanian War of 572–591	Battle of Solachon	(Turkey)	Spring	Byzantine forces under Philippicus defeat a Sasanian army in Mesopotamia.
586	Byzantine–Sasanian War of 572–591	Siege of Mardin	(Turkey)		Byzantines aided by the Salihids siege Sasanian-owned city.
587	Soga–Mononobe conflict	Battle of Shigisan	(Japan)	July	Buddhist Soga clan defeats Shinto Mononobe clan. Mononobe clan leader Mononobe no Moriya killed in battle.
588	Byzantine–Sassanid War of 572–591	Battle of Martyropolis	(Turkey)	Summer	Byzantine forces defeat a Sasanian army at Martyropolis.
588	Perso-Turkic war of 588–589	Battle of Hyrcanian Rock	(Iran) (Turkmenistan)	April	Sasanians under Bahram Chobin decisively defeat Göktürks and Hephthalites under Khagan Bagha Qaghan.
589	Perso-Turkic war of 588–589	Battle of Herat	(Afghanistan)	Aug	General Bahram Chobin of the Sasanian Empire defeats the First Turkic Khaganate under prince Yangsu Tegin of Bukhara.
590	Anglo-Saxon settlement of Britain	Battle of Alclud Ford	(Scotland)		Kingdom of Rheged defeats Bernicia
591	Sasanian civil war of 589–591 and Byzantine–Sassanid War of 572–591	Battle of Blarathon	(Iran)	Aug	Combined Byzantine-Persian armies led by Byzantine generals John Mystacon and Narses and Persian king Khosrau II defeat the Persian rebel Bahram Chobin.
592	Anglo-Saxon settlement of Britain	Battle of Woden's Burg	(England)		Britons defeat Ceawlin of the West Saxons.
598	Goguryeo-Sui Wars	Battle of Linyuguan	(China)		Korean Goguryeo Kingdom repulses the Chinese Sui dynasty.
599	Avar–Byzantine Wars	Battles of Viminacium	(Serbia)	Summer	Byzantines defeat the Avars.
599		Conquest of the Revati Island	(India)		Chalukya King Mangalesha's navy conquers Revati Island.

== 7th century ==
Year	War	Battle	Loc.	Date(s)	Description
602	Sui–Early Lý War	Battle of Co Loa	(Vietnam)		The Chinese Sui dynasty defeats and conquers the Vietnamese Early Lý dynasty.
603	Anglo-Saxon settlement of Britain	Battle of Degsastan	(Scotland)		Northumbrian king Æthelfrith defeats Scots under Áedán mac Gabráin
604		Battle of Dhi Qar	(Iraq)	604—611	Arabs in southern Iraq defeat a Sasanian army.
612	Goguryeo–Sui Wars	Siege of Yodong Fortress	(China)		Korean Goguryeo defeats the Chinese Sui dynasty.
612	Goguryeo–Sui Wars	Battle of Salsu	(North Korea)		Goguryeo cavalry forces, although outnumbered, overwhelm the Chinese troops in combat and eventually emerge victorious.
613	Byzantine–Sasanian War of 602–628	Battle of Antioch	(Syria)		An attack by Byzantine forces on the recently captured Antioch ends in a decisive Sasanian victory.
614	Byzantine–Sasanian War of 602–628	Siege of Jerusalem	(Israel) / (Palestine)	April—May	After 21 days, Jerusalem falls to the Sasanian forces and their Jewish allies.
615	Jewish revolt against Heraclius	Jewish expedition to Tyre	(Lebanon)		Jewish forces withdrawal from their positions in Palaestina Prima.
616	Anglo-Saxon settlement of Britain	Battle of Chester	(England)		Æthelfrith defeats the armies of Welsh kingdoms Powys and Rhôs.
616	Anglo-Saxon settlement of Britain	Battle of the River Idle	(England)		East Anglia defeats Northumbria under Aethelfrith, who is slain in battle.
617	Avar–Byzantine wars	Siege of Thessalonica (617)	(Greece)		Sclaveni under the chieftain Chatzon attempt to capture the city.
617	Transition from Sui to Tang	Battle of Huoyi	(China)	8 Sep	Li Yuan defeats the Sui dynasty and enters Chang'an.
618	Transition from Sui to Tang	Battle of Yanshi	(China)	5–6 Oct	Wang Shichong scores a decisive victory over Li Mi, breaking the blockade of Luoyang and taking over the latter's followers.
618	Transition from Sui to Tang	Battle of Qianshuiyuan	(China)	29 Nov	The Tang dynasty scores a decisive victory over their rival Xue Rengao.
618	Chalukya–Pallava Wars	Battle of Pullalur	(India)	618—619	Chalukya Empire defeats the Pallava Kingdom.
618		Siege of Sumpa	(China)		Namri Songtsen the Emperor of Tibet annexes the Kingdom of Sumpa after taking their capital.
619	Byzantine–Sasanian War of 602–628	Siege of Alexandria	(Egypt)		The advancing Sasanian armies easily capture Alexandria in their campaign to conquer Roman Egypt.
619		Battle of Narmada	(India)	Feb	Chalukyas under Pulakeshin II defeat Vardhana dynasty under Harsha and conquer the Deccan up to the Narmada River.
619		Yawm al-Buath	(Saudi Arabia)		Aws tribe defeats khazraj tribe, Abd Allah ibn Ubayy chosen as a leader of Medina
620	Transition from Sui to Tang	Battle of Jiexiu	(China)	May	Li Shimin of Tang dynasty defeats Liu Wuzhou after an extended skirmish.
621	Transition from Sui to Tang	Battle of Hulao	(China)	28 May	The Tang under Li Shimin crush the forces of Dou Jiande. Luoyang surrenders soon after, securing the Tang dynasty's victory in the civil war that followed the collapse of the Sui dynasty.
621	Transition from Sui to Tang	Battle of Jiangling	(China)	Autumn	Tang defeat Xiao Xian.
624	Muslim–Quraysh War	Battle of Badr	(Saudi Arabia)	13 March	Muslim forces under Muhammad defeat a larger, pagan, Meccan force, killing their leaders.
625	Muslim–Quraysh War	Battle of Uhud	(Saudi Arabia)	23 March	Khalid ibn al-Walid defeats a Muslim force, before eventually converting to Islam himself and joining the Muslim forces.
625	Byzantine–Sasanian War of 602–628	Battle of Sarus	(Turkey)	April	Heraclius fights the Sasanian army of General Shahrbaraz, ending in a draw that doesn't stop the Persian advance towards Constantinople.
626		Siege of Constantinople	(Turkey)	June—July	The Avars, in alliance with the Sasanians and Slavic tribes, besiege Constantinople unsuccessfully.
627	Perso-Turkic war of 627–629	Siege of Derbent	(Russia)	Early 627	Tong Yabgu of Western Turks capture the fortress.
627	Muslim–Quraysh War	Battle of the Trench	(Saudi Arabia)	31 March—c. 14 April	An army from the city of Mecca fails to capture Muslim-held Medina, defended by Muhammad using an early form of trench warfare.
627	Byzantine–Sassanid War of 572–591	Battle of Nineveh	(Iraq)	12 Dec	Byzantines under Emperor Heraclius defeat Sasanian Persians.
627	Byzantine–Sasanian War of 602–628 and Perso-Turkic war of 627–629	Siege of Tbilisi	(Georgia (country))	627—628	Joint attack of the Byzantine Empire allied with the Western Turkic Khaganate where they defeat the Sasanian Empire and their vassal the Kingdom of Iberia.
628	Military campaigns of Muhammad	Battle of Khaybar	(Saudi Arabia)	March/April	Forces under Muhammad defeat the Jewish tribes living in the Hejaz region of the Arab peninsula
628	Anglo-Saxon settlement of Britain	Battle of Cirencester	(England)		Mercia under Penda of Mercia defeats Cynegils and Cwichelm of Wessex.
629	Arab–Byzantine wars	Battle of Mu'tah	(Jordan)	Sep	Khalid ibn al-Walid leads a Muslim Arab army against a larger Roman army in his first battle against the Roman Empire, which results in a Byzantine victory.
629	Muslim–Quraysh War	Conquest of Mecca	(Saudi Arabia)	Dec 629—Jan 630	Muhammad conquers Mecca without any bloodshed.
629	Irish clan battles	Battle of Fid Eoin	(Northern Ireland)		Irish clan battle where the Dál nAraidi defeated the Dál Riata and killed their king.
630	Military campaigns of Muhammad	Battle of Hunayn	(Saudi Arabia)		Muhammad defeats the Hawazin Bedouin tribe.
630	Military campaigns of Muhammad	Expedition of Tabuk	(Saudi Arabia)	Oct	Muhammad successfully campaigns against the Byzantines at Tabuk in his last campaign.
630	Military campaigns of Muhammad	Battle of Autas	(Saudi Arabia)	Dec	Muslims defeat coalition of Arab tribes.
630	Military campaigns of Muhammad	Siege of Ta'if	(Saudi Arabia)	Dec	Banu Thaqif fend off siege from Muhammad, surrender a few months later regardless.
630	Tang campaign against the Eastern Turks	Battle of Yinshan	(China)	27 March	Tang Chinese army, led by Li Jing, decisively defeats the Eastern Turks, fall of the Eastern Turkic Khaganate.
630	Anglo-Saxon settlement of Britain	Battle of Cefn Digoll	(Wales)		Edwin of Northumbria defeated by King Cadwallon ap Cadfan of Gwynedd and Penda of Mercia. Northumbria loses control of Gwynedd.
631		Battle of Wogastisburg			King Samo defeats Austrasian forces, led by Dagobert I, Merovingian king of the Franks.
632	Arab-Byzantine wars	Expedition of Usama bin Zayd	(Syria)	June	Rashidun forces under Usama ibn Zayd successfully operate against the Byzantines .
632	Ridda Wars	Battle of Zhu Qissa	(Saudi Arabia)	25–30 July	Rashidun forces defeat the rebels of Tulayha.
632	Ridda Wars	Battle of Buzakha	(Saudi Arabia)	Sep	Rashiduns defeat the pagan Arab tribes.
632	Ridda Wars	Battle of Zafar	(Saudi Arabia)	Oct	Khalid ibn al-Walid defeats rebelling tribes.
632	Ridda Wars	Battle of Yamama	(Saudi Arabia)	Dec	Rashidun forces defeat a numerically superior rebel army under Musaylimah, killing him.
632	Ridda Wars	Battle of Dibba	(United Arab Emirates)	632—634	Generals of Caliph Abu Bakr decisively defeat rebel pagan tribes.
633	Muslim conquest of Persia	Battle of Chains	(Kuwait)	April	Khalid ibn al-Walid decisively defeats a Persian army in his first battle against the Persian Empire.
633	Muslim conquest of Persia	Battle of River	(Iraq)	April	Khalid ibn al-Walid decisively defeats the Persian Empire.
633	Muslim conquest of Persia	Battle of Walaja	(Iraq)	May	Khalid ibn al-Walid decisively defeats the larger forces of the Persian Empire using a double envelopment maneuver.
633	Muslim conquest of Persia	Battle of Ullais	(Iraq)	May	Khalid ibn al-Walid decisively defeats a larger army from the Persian Empire.
633	Muslim conquest of Persia	Battle of Hira	(Iraq)	May	Khalid ibn al-Walid defeats Persians.
633	Muslim conquest of Persia	Battle of Al-Anbar	(Iraq)		Khalid ibn al-Walid defeats Persians.
633	Muslim conquest of Persia	Battle of Dawmat al-Jandal	(Saudi Arabia)	Aug	Khalid ibn al-Walid defeats rebelling Arab Christians.
633	Anglo-Saxon settlement of Britain	Battle of Hatfield Chase	(England)	12 Oct	Penda of Mercia allied with the Kingdom of Gwynedd defeats and kills Edwin of Northumbria.
633	Muslim conquest of Persia	Battle of Muzayyah	(Iraq)	Nov	Khalid ibn al-Walid decisively defeats Persians and Arab Christians.
633	Muslim conquest of Persia	Battle of Saniyy	(Iraq)	Nov	Khalid ibn al-Walid decisively defeats Persians and Arab Christians.
633	Muslim conquest of Persia	Battle of Zumail	(Iraq)	Nov	Khalid ibn al-Walid decisively defeats the Persian forces, conquering most of Mesopotamia (Iraq) from the Persian Empire.
633	Muslim conquest of Persia	Battle of Ayn al-Tamr	(Iraq)		Khalid ibn al-Walid decisively defeats Persia and its Christian Arab allies.
634	Muslim conquest of Persia	Battle of Firaz	(Iraq)	Jan	Khalid ibn al-Walid defeats the combined forces of the Persian Empire and Roman Empire, completing his conquest of Mesopotamia.
634	Arab–Byzantine Wars	Battle of Dathin	(Palestine)	4 Feb	Rashiduns defeat Byzantines around Gaza.
634	Muslim conquest of Persia	Battle of Marj Rahit	(Syria)	24 April	Rashiduns decisively defeat Ghassanids.
634	Muslim conquest of Persia	Battle of Babylon	(Iraq)	13 May	Rashiduns defeat Sasanians.
634	Arab–Byzantine Wars	Battle of al-Qaryatayn	(Syria)	June	Rashiduns defeat Ghassanids.
634	Arab–Byzantine Wars	Battle of Bosra	(Syria)	June—July	A small Muslim army under Khalid ibn al-Walid lay siege to the city of Bosra, decisively defeating a larger army of Romans and Christian Arabs.
634	Arab–Byzantine Wars	Battle of Ajnadayn	(Israel) / (Palestine)	July/Aug	The first major pitched battle between the Muslim Arabs under Khalid ibn al-Walid against a larger Roman army under Heraclius leads to a decisive Muslim victory for Khalid.
634	Arab–Byzantine Wars	Battle of Yaqusa	(Syria)	Aug	Arabs defeat Byzantines.
634	Arab–Byzantine Wars	Battle of Marj al-Saffar (634)	(Syria)	Aug 634—23 Jan 635	Arabs defeat Byzantines.
634	Arab–Byzantine Wars	Siege of Damascus	(Syria)	21 Aug – 19 Sep	Thomas surrenders after four-week siege with no relief in sight and Muslim forces inside the city.
634	Arab–Byzantine Wars	Battle of Sanita-al-Uqab	(Syria)	Sep	12,000 Byzantines are defeated in an attempt to break the siege of Damascus in a battle 20 miles north of the city.
634	Arab–Byzantine Wars	Battle of Maraj-al-Debaj	(Syria)	Sep	Refugees from the surrender at Damascus are intercepted just short of Antioch and butchered by Muslim forces.
634	Muslim conquest of Persia	Battle of the Bridge	(Iraq)	25 Oct	Persians decisively defeat Muslim Arabs.
634	Muslim conquest of Persia	Battle of Kaskar	(Iraq)		Rashiduns defeat Sasanian Empire.
634	Muslim conquest of Persia	Battle of Namaraq	(Iraq)		Rashiduns defeat Sasanian Empire.
634	Anglo-Saxon settlement of Britain	Battle of Heavenfield	(England)		Oswald of Bernicia defeats and kills the Welsh king Cadwallon ap Cadfan of Gwynedd.
635	Muslim conquest of Persia	Battle of Fahl	(Jordan)	Jan	Khalid ibn al-Walid defeats the forces of the Roman Empire under Theodore the Sacellarius.
635	Muslim conquest of Persia	Battle of Buwaib	(Iraq)	April	Rashiduns defeat Sasanian advance.
635	Muslim conquest of Persia	Siege of Emesa	(Syria)	Dec 635—March 636	Rashiduns under Khalid ibn al-Walid take the city of Emesa from the Byzantines.
636	Arab–Byzantine wars	Battle of Yarmouk	(Syria)	15–20 Aug	Muslim Arab forces under Khalid ibn al-Walid crush the Byzantine forces led by Theodore Trithyrius and conquer the Levant from the Roman Empire.
636	Muslim conquest of Persia	Battle of al-Qadisiyyah	(Iraq)	16–19 Nov	Muslim Arabs defeat a Sasanian army led by general Rostam Farrokhzad.
636	Arab–Byzantine wars	Siege of Jerusalem	(Israel) / (Palestine)	Nov 636—April 637	Arabs take city from Byzantines.
636	Arab–Byzantine wars	Siege of Latakia	(Syria)		Laodicea annexed by Arabs.
636	Muslim conquest of Persia	Battle of Burs	(Iraq)		Rashiduns defeat Sasanian garrison.
636	Muslim conquest of Persia	Battle of Babylon	(Iraq)		Rashiduns take city from Sasanians in pursuit of Ctesiphon.
637	Muslim conquest of Persia	Siege of Ctesiphon	(Iraq)	Jan—March	Muslim Arabs conquered the Sasanian capital of Ctesiphon.
637	Muslim conquest of Persia	Battle of Jalula	(Iraq)	April	Rashiduns annex all territory west of the Zagros Mountains from the Persians.
637	Arab–Byzantine wars	Battle of Hazir	(Syria)	June	Khalid ibn al-Walid defeats the garrison of Qinnasrin under Meenas at Hazir in Syria, wiping out the Byzantine force.
637		Battle of Moira	(Northern Ireland)	Summer	Domnall II, High King of Ireland defeats his foster son Congal Cáech King of Ulaid as well as Domnall Brecc king of Dál Riata in Northern Ireland. Cáech killed in the battle.
637	Arab–Byzantine wars	Siege of Aleppo	(Syria)	Aug—Oct	Khalid ibn al-Walid takes city from Byzantines.
637	Arab–Byzantine wars	Battle of the Iron Bridge	(Turkey)	Oct	Khalid ibn al-Walid decisively defeats a larger Roman army under Heraclius in his final battle against the Roman Empire, conquering northern Syria and southern Turkey.
638	Arab–Byzantine wars	Siege of Germanicia	(Turkey)		Rashidun Caliphate takes city of Germanica from the Byzantines.
638	Early Tang expansion	Battle of Songzhou	(China)		Tang Chinese defeat the Tibetans.
639	Early Tang expansion	Battle of Lake Baikal	(China)		Tang Chinese defeat and conquer the western Turkic Tiele.
640	Muslim conquest of Egypt	Siege of Babylon Fortress	(Egypt)	May—Dec	Rashidun Caliphate takes major Byzantine fortress in Egypt.
640	Muslim conquest of Egypt	Battle of Heliopolis	(Egypt)	6 July	Rashidun Caliphate decisively defeats the Byzantines in Egypt.
640	Emperor Taizong's campaign against the Western Regions	Siege of Karakhoja	(China)		Tang Chinese defeat and conquer the Karakhoja.
641	Muslim conquest of Egypt	Siege of Alexandria	(Egypt)	March—Sep	Rashidun Caliphate takes Byzantine capital of province of Egypt.
641	Muslim conquest of Persia	Siege of Shushtar	(Iran)	641—642	Muslim Arabs defeat Sasanians.
641	Emperor Taizong's campaign against Xueyantuo	Battle of Nuozhen River	(China)		Li Shiji intercepts and decisively defeats Xueyantuo attack.
642	Early Muslim conquests	First Battle of Dongola	(Sudan)	Summer	Nubian Kingdom of Makuria defeats the Rashidun Caliphate.
642	Anglo-Saxon settlement of Britain	Battle of Maserfield	(England)	5 Aug	Penda of Mercia defeats and kills Oswald of Bernicia.
642	Chalukya–Pallava Wars	Battle of Manimangala	(India)		Pallavas defeat the Chalukyas.
642	Chalukya–Pallava Wars	Battle of Vatapi	(India)		Pallavas defeat the Chalukyas and conquer Vatapi.
642	Muslim conquest of Persia	Siege of Gundishapur	(Iran)		Muslim Arabs take city from Sasanians.
642	Muslim conquest of Persia	Battle of Nahavand	(Iran)		Muslim Arabs gain a major victory over the Persian Empire, Sasanian dynasty under near collapse and loses centralization.
642	Muslim conquest of Persia	Battle of Spahan	(Iran)		Arabs defeat Persians.
643	Muslim conquest of Persia	Battle of Bayrudh	(Iran)		Arabs defeat Persians.
643	Muslim conquest of Persia	Battle of Waj Rudh	(Iran)		Arabs defeat Persians.
643	Muslim conquest of Persia	Battle of Bishapur	(Iran)	643—644	Rashidun Caliphate defeats Sasanian Empire.
644	Muslim conquests in South Asia	Battle of Rasil	(Pakistan)	Early 644	Rashidun Caliphate defeats the Rai Kingdom on the western bank of the Indus River.
644	Emperor Taizong's campaign against the Western Regions	Battle of Karasahr	(China)		Tang Chinese defeat the Western Turkic Khaganate.
645	Goguryeo–Tang War	Siege of Yodong Fortress	(China)	April—Oct	The Chinese Tang dynasty defeats Goguryeo.
645	Goguryeo–Tang War	Battle of Mount Jupil	(China)	23 June	The Chinese Tang dynasty army annihilated the Korea Goguryeo field army.
645	Goguryeo–Tang War	Siege of Ansi Fortress	(China)	23 June – 18 Sep	Korean Goguryeo forces defeat the Chinese Tang dynasty.
646	Muslim conquest of Egypt	Battle of Nikiou	(Egypt)	May	Arabs repel Byzantine attempt to retake Egypt.
647	Muslim conquest of the Maghreb	Battle of Sufetula	(Tunisia)		Rashidun Caliphate defeats and kills Gregory the Patrician, the rebelling Byzantine Exarch of Africa.
648		Battle of Dos Pilas	(Guatemala)		Mayan city-state of Dos Pilas attacked and defeated by Yuknoom Che'en II of Calakmul, Balaj Chan K'awiil captured.
648	Emperor Taizong's campaign against the Western Regions	Battle of Kucha	(China)	648—19 Jan 649	The ChineseTang dynasty defeat the Western Turkic Khaganate.
650	Muslim conquest of Persia	Battle of Istakhr	(Iran)	650—651	Rashiduns sack new Sasanian capital, kill over 40,000 defenders, and finish the annexation of the province of Pars.
651	Muslim conquest of Persia	Battle of Ray	(Iran)		Rashiduns, with the help of a defecting noble family, defeat the Sasanians.
651	Muslim conquest of Persia	Battle of Oxus River	(Turkmenistan)		Muslim Arabs gain a final victory over the Persian Empire, ending the Persian Sasanian dynasty.
652	Muslim conquest of Persia	Battle of Nishapur	(Iran)		Rashiduns defeat the Zoroastrian remnant House of Karen.
652	Muslim conquest of Persia	Siege of Herat	(Afghanistan)		Rashiduns defeat the House of Karen.
652	Early Muslim conquests	Second Battle of Dongola	(Sudan)		Rashiduns defeated by Makuria, Baqt signed between Makuria and the Caliphate.
652	First Arab–Khazar War	Battle of Balanjar	(Russia)		Khazar Turks defeat the Rashidun Caliphate's forces.
654	Muslim conquest of Persia	Battle of Badghis	(Afghanistan)		Rashiduns defeat the House of Karen and Hephthalites, subjecting the former.
654	Anglo-Saxon settlement of Britain	Battle of Bulcamp	(England)		Mercian King Penda defeats and kills East Anglian King Anna and his son Jurmin.
655	Anglo-Saxon settlement of Britain	Battle of the Winwaed	(England)	15 Nov	Northumbrian king Oswiu defeats and kills pagan Mercian king Penda.
655	Arab–Byzantine wars	Battle of the Masts	(Turkey)		Rashiduns defeat the Byzantine navy.
656		siege of Uthman ebn affan's house	(Saudi Arabia)	June	Uthman assassinated, start of the First Fitna
656	First Fitna	Battle of the Camel	(Iraq)	8 Dec	Rashidun forces under Ali ibn Abi Talib defeat a rebel army at Basra, Iraq.
657	Tang campaigns against the Western Turks	Battle of Irtysh River	(China)		Tang Chinese army led by Su Dingfang decisively defeats the Western Turkic khagan Ashina Helu, led to the Tang conquest of the Western Turks.
657	First Fitna	Battle of Siffin	(Syria)	26–28 July	Forces of Caliph Ali ibn Abi Talib battle rebel forces of Muawiyah I, Governor of Syria, indecisively.
658	First Fitna	Battle of Nahrawan	(Iraq)	17 July	Caliph Ali of the Rashidun Caliphate defeats leader Abd Allah ibn Wahb al-Rasibi of the Kharijites.
660	Baekje–Tang War	Battle of Hwangsanbeol	(South Korea)	9 July	A superior Silla army defeats Baekje decisively, killing General Gyebaek.
663	Goguryeo–Tang War	Battle of Baekgang	(South Korea)		Tang Chinese and Silla forces decisively defeat Yamato Japanese and Baekje forces.
663	Byzantine–Lombard wars	Battle of Forino	(Italy)		Duke Romuald I of Benevento defeats general Saburrus of the Byzantine Empire.
667	Goguryeo–Tang War	Battle of Geumsan	(China)		Tang dynasty decisively defeats Goguryeo.
668	Goguryeo–Tang War	Conquest of P'yongyang	(North Korea)	22 Oct	Silla and the Chinese Tang dynasty defeat and conquer Goguryeo.
670		Battle of Dafei River	(China)		Tang Chinese army annihilated the Tibetans, and take over control of the Tarim Basin.
671	Anglo-Saxon settlement of Britain	Battle of Two Rivers	(United Kingdom)		Northumbrians defeat Picts.
674	Arab–Byzantine wars	First Arab siege of Constantinople	(Turkey)	674—678	The Byzantines defeat the Arabs after 4 years of siege through the use of Greek fire.
674		Battle of Peruvallanallur	(India)		Parameswaravarman I of the Pallava dynasty decisively defeats the Chalukyas.
675	Silla-Tang War	Battle of Maeso	(South Korea)	29 Sep	Silla fights Tang dynasty.
675	Anglo-Saxon settlement of Britain	Battle of Biedanheafde			Æscwine of Wessex defeats Wulfhere of Mercia, repelling his invasion of Wessex.
678	Arab–Byzantine wars	Siege of Thessalonica	(Greece)	676—678	Byzantines defeat Sclaveni siege of Thessalonica after two years.
679	Anglo-Saxon settlement of Britain	Battle of the Trent	(England)		Mercia defeats Northumbria.
680	Frankish civil war	Battle of Lucofao	(France)	Early 680	Neustrians defeat Austrasians in Frankish civil war.
680	Byzantine–Bulgarian wars	Battle of Ongal	(Romania)	Summer	Bulgar and probably Slavonic forces under Khan Asparukh defeat a Byzantine army led by Emperor Constantine IV near the mouth of the River Danube. As a result, a Bulgar kingdom is founded on former Byzantine territories in the Balkan peninsula.
680	Second Fitna	Battle of Karbala	(Iraq)	10 Oct	The Umayyad forces defeat Husayn ibn Ali, grandson of Muhammad, and his partisans.
682	Arab–Byzantine Wars	Battle of Vescera	(Algeria)		Defeat of the Umayyads under Uqba ibn Nafi by the Berbers and Byzantines.
683	Second Fitna	Siege of Mecca	(Saudi Arabia)	24 Sep – 26 Nov	Unsuccessful siege of Mecca by Umayyad forces, which allows Ibn al-Zubayr to set himself up as anti-Caliph there.
684	Second Fitna	Battle of Marj Rahit	(Syria)	18 Aug	Umayyads supported by the Banu Kalb defeat a hostile tribal coalition around the Qays and secure control of Syria.
685	Second Fitna	Battle of Ayn al-Warda	(Syria) (Turkey)	4 Jan	The "Penitents" of Kufa are annihilated by the Umayyads.
685	Pictish-Northumbrian conflicts	Battle of Dun Nechtain	(Scotland)	20 May	Picts defeat Northumbrians in Scotland, killing their leader.
686	Second Fitna	Battle of Madhar	(Iraq)	Late 686—687	Forces of Mus'ab ibn al-Zubayr defeat pro-Alid forces.
686	Second Fitna	Battle of Harura	(Iraq)	Late 686—687	Mus'ab ibn al-Zubayr defeats pro-Alid forces of Mukhtar al-Thaqafi and temporarily gains control of all of Iraq.
687		Battle of Tertry	(France)		Merovingian Franks defeat Neustria and Burgundy.
688	Muslim conquest of the Maghreb	Battle of Mamma	(Algeria)		Umayyads defeat the Berber Kingdom of Altava and kill their king Kusaila in battle.
689		Battle of Coronate	(Italy)		The army of Cunipert, king of the Lombards, defeat the followers of the usurper Alahis on the Adda River.
691	Second Fitna	Battle of Maskin	(Iraq)	Mid-Oct	Umayyads defeat Mus'ab ibn al-Zubayr and recover control of Iraq.
692	Second Fitna	Siege of Mecca	(Saudi Arabia)	March—Oct/Nov	Umayyad forces under al-Hajjaj ibn Yusuf capture Mecca, the stronghold of the anti-Caliph Ibn al-Zubayr, ending the Second Fitna with an Umayyad victory.
692	Arab–Byzantine Wars	Battle of Sebastopolis	(Turkey)		Umayyads defeat Byzantine forces after the defection of 20,000 Slav soldiers.
695	Frisian–Frankish wars	Battle of Dorestad	(Netherlands)		Franks under Pepin of Herstal defeat Frisians.
698	Muslim conquest of the Maghreb	Battle of Carthage	(Tunisia)		After a surprise attack of Byzantine forces on Carthage, Umayyad forces take back the city with very heavy losses.
698	Muslim conquest of the Maghreb	Battle of Meskiana	(Algeria)		Berber Queen Dihya defeats Umayyads under Hasan ibn al-Nu'man.
698		Battle of Tianmenling	(China)		The Balhae allied with the Mohe tribes defeat the Tang dynasty in Manchuria.

== 8th century ==
Year	War	Battle	Loc.	Date(s)	Description
701		Battle of Dayr al-Jamajim	(Iraq)	April	Umayyad forces under al-Hajjaj ibn Yusuf defeat the Iraqi rebellion of Abd al-Rahman ibn Muhammad ibn al-Ash'ath.
703	Muslim conquest of the Maghreb	Battle of Tabarka	(Algeria)		Umayyads defeat and kill Queen Dihya in battle, annexing the Berber Kingdom of the Aurès.
706	Muslim conquest of Transoxiana	Conquest of Paikand	(Uzbekistan)		Umayyads take Paykend from the local Sogdian city-states.
707	Arab–Byzantine Wars	Siege of Tyana	(Turkey)	707—708	Umayyads besiege the Byzantine town of Tyana over the winter and capture it after a relief army is defeated in spring.
708	Byzantine–Bulgarian Wars	Battle of Anchialus	(Bulgaria)		Bulgarians under Tervel defeat a Byzantine army under Justinian II.
709	Muslim conquests of Afghanistan	Battle of Kabul	(Afghanistan)		
709	Muslim conquest of Transoxiana	Battle of Bukhara	(Uzbekistan)		Umayyads conquer Bukhara after defeating the local Sogdian rulers and the Second Turkic Khaganate.
711	Muslim conquest of the Iberian Peninsula	Battle of Guadalete	(Spain)	July	The invading Umayyad armies defeat the Visigoths in Iberia, killing King Roderic.
711	Muslim conquest of the Iberian Peninsula	Battle of Écija	(Spain)	Mid-Aug	The Umayyad Caliphate under Tariq ibn Ziyad defeats the Visigothic Kingdom
711	Arab conquest of Sindh	Battle of Aror	(Pakistan)		Umayyads under Muhammad ibn al-Qasim conquer Sindh encompassing modern-day Pakistan from Dahir of Aror.
711		Battle of Bolchu	(China)		The Türgesh are defeated by the Eastern Turkic Khaganate.
712	Muslim conquest of Transoxiana	Siege of Samarkand	(Uzbekistan)		Umayyads capture Samarkand from the local Sogdian rulers.
713	Muslim conquest of the Iberian Peninsula	Battle of Orihuela	(Spain)	Late March	The Umayyad Caliphate commanded by Abd al-Aziz ibn Musa defeats the Visigothic Kingdom under Theodemir.
715	Frankish Civil War	Battle of Compiègne	(France)	26 Sep	In the first significant battle of the Frankish Civil War of 715–718, Ragenfrid defeats Theudoald.
716	Frankish Civil War	Battle of Cologne	(Germany)		Charles Martel suffers his only defeat.
716	Frankish Civil War	Battle of Amblève	(Belgium)		Charles Martel defeats his Neustrian and Frisian rivals.
717	Frankish Civil War	Battle of Vincy	(France)	21 March	Charles Martel and the Austrasians defeat the Frankish king, Chilperic II, and his mayor of the palace, Ragenfrid.
717	Arab–Byzantine wars	Second Arab siege of Constantinople	(Turkey)	15 July/Aug 717—15 Aug 718	Umayyad forces lay siege to the Byzantine Capital once more. They are defeated after a year by Leo III with the help of a Bulgar army under Khan Tervel.
717	Muslim conquest of Transoxiana	Battle of Aksu	(China)		Tang Chinese forces defeat an alliance of the forces of Umayyad Muslims, Tibetans, and Turgesh Turks.
718	Frankish Civil War	Battle of Soissons	(France)		The last significant battle of the Frankish civil war, with Charles Martel victorious.
720		Battle of Aqr	(Iraq)	24 Aug	The Umayyad Caliphate under Maslama ibn Abd al-Malik defeats Yazid ibn al-Muhallab.
721	Umayyad invasion of Gaul	Battle of Toulouse	(France)	9 June	Umayyad forces besiege Toulouse, subsequently lose to Odo of Aquitaine's relief troops.
721	Anglo-Saxon settlement of Britain	Battle of Hehil	(England)	721—722	Britons defeat Anglo-Saxons of Wessex "among the Cornish".
722		Battle of Marj al-Hijara	(Armenia) (Azerbaijan)	Feb—March	Khazars decisively defeat army of the local Arab governor.
722	Reconquista	Battle of Covadonga	(Spain)	Summer	Asturian forces defeat the Umayyad invaders for the first time (date uncertain 718–725).
723	Arab–Khazar Wars	Battle of Balanjar	(Russia)		Umayyad forces successfully conquer Balanjar from the Khazars, looting and killing its population in the process.
724	Muslim conquest of Transoxiana	Day of Thirst	(Tajikistan)		Umayyad army is routed by the Turgesh; beginning of the collapse of the Umayyad position in Transoxiana.
727	Arab–Byzantine Wars	Siege of Nicaea	(Turkey)	July—Aug	Umayyad forces unsuccessfully besiege Nicaea for 40 days.
729	Muslim conquest of Transoxiana	Battle of Baykand	(Uzbekistan)		Umayyad forces break through Turgesh encirclement and reach Bukhara.
729	Muslim conquest of Transoxiana	Siege of Kamarja	(Uzbekistan)		Umayyad Arabs defend the fortress of Kamarja for 58 days against overwhelming Turgesh numbers before being allowed to retire.
729		Battle of Ravenna	(Italy)		Byzantine forces are defeated by Italians following an argument about icon veneration.
730	Second Arab–Khazar War	Battle of Marj Ardabil	(Iran)	9 Dec	Khazars defeat the Umayyads.
730	Second Arab–Khazar War	Battle of Bajarwan	(Azerbaijan)	Dec	Umayyad Caliphate defeats the Khazars.
731	Muslim conquest of Transoxiana	Battle of the Defile	(Uzbekistan)	July	Khagan Suluk of the Türgesh defeats the Umayyad Caliphate under governor Junayd ibn Abd ar-Rahman al-Murri of Khurasan.
732	Umayyad invasion of Gaul	Battle of the River Garonne	(France)	Before 10 Oct	Governor Abd al-Rahman ibn Abd Allah al-Ghafiqi of Al-Andalus of the Umayyad Caliphate defeats duke Odo the Great of Aquitaine.
732	Umayyad invasion of Gaul	Battle of Tours	(France)	10 Oct	Umayyad forces, led by Abd er-Rahman, lose to Charles Martel near Poitiers.
732	Second Arab–Khazar War	Battle of Balanjar	(Russia)		Umayyad Arabs defeat the Khazars.
734	Frisian–Frankish wars	Battle of the Boarn	(Netherlands)		Charles Martel defeats the Frisians, killing King Poppo and ending the Frisian Kingdom.
737	Muslim conquest of Transoxiana	Battle of the Baggage	(Afghanistan)	30 Sep	Turgesh drive back an Umayyad invasion of Khuttal and capture their baggage train.
737	Muslim conquest of Transoxiana	Battle of Kharistan	(Afghanistan)	Dec	Umayyad governor of Khorasan Asad ibn Abdallah al-Qasri defeats the Turgesh khagan in battle, halting the Turgesh invasion south of the Oxus River.
737	Umayyad invasion of Gaul	Siege of Avignon	(France)		Franks under Charles Martel destroy Umayyad garrison.
737	Umayyad invasion of Gaul	Siege of Narbonne	(France)		Franks besiege Umayyad city, results inconclusive.
737	Umayyad invasion of Gaul	Battle of the River Berre	(France)		Franks defeat Umayyad forces attempting to relieve siege of Narbonne.
740	Arab–Byzantine Wars	Battle of Akroinon	(Turkey)		Byzantine emperor Leo III the Isaurian wins an important victory over the Umayyads in modern Turkey.
740	Berber Revolt	Battle of the Nobles	(Morocco)		Berber forces defeat the Umayyads near Tangier, killing their leader and 10,000 Arabs.
741	Berber Revolt	Battle of Bagdoura	(Morocco)	Oct	Berbers push the Umayyad Caliphate out of Morocco.
741		Siege of Laon	(France)		Franks under Carloman and Pepin the Short defeat the rebellion of their brother Grifo.
743		Battle of Epfach	(Germany)		Franks under Carloman and Pepin the Short defeat a rebellion of Baiuvarii, Alemanni and Slavic allies.
746	Arab–Byzantine Wars	Battle of Keramaia	(Cyprus)		The Cibyrrhaeots defeat the Egyptian fleet of the Umayyad Caliphate.
746		Battle of Rupar Thutha	(Iraq)		Kufa and Mosul taken by Marwan II.
749	Abbasid revolution	Siege of Wasit	(Iraq)	Aug/Sep 749—June/July 750	Umayyad holdout led by Governor Yazid ibn Umar al-Fazari taken by the Abbasids.
749	Bashmurian revolts	Sack of Rosetta	(Egypt)		Egyptian rebels sack Rosetta and kill its Arab inhabitants.
750	Abbasid revolution	Battle of Zab	(Iraq)	25 Jan	Decisive victory for the Abbasids resulting in the Umayyads' fall and rise of a new Caliphate.
750	Dano-Swedish wars	Battle of Bråvalla	(Sweden)		The Danish army is defeated by the Swedish.
751	Muslim conquest of Transoxiana	Battle of Talas	(Kazakhstan) (Kyrgyzstan)	May—Sep	Abbasid forces defeat Tang forces on the banks of the Talas River.
756	An Shi Rebellion	Battle of Yongqiu	(China)	Spring	Tang forces deal a decisive blow to the Yan.
756	Muslim conquest of the Iberian Peninsula	Battle of Musarah	(Spain)	March	Umayyad prince Abd al-Rahman I, on the run from his dynasty's overthrow by the Abbasids, defeats Yusuf ibn Abd al-Rahman al-Fihri, the Governor of al-Andalus, and takes control of Iberia.
756		Battle of the Long Walls	(Turkey)		The Bulgar Khan Kormisosh is defeated by the Byzantine forces of Emperor Constantine V. As a result, the Bulgars overthrow Kormissosh and a period of political instability begins in the Bulgar khanate.
756	Byzantine–Bulgarian wars	Battle of Marcellae	(Bulgaria)		Emperor Constantine V of Byzantium defeats a Bulgar army under the new Khan Vinekh.
757	An Lushan Rebellion	Battle of Suiyang	(China)	18 Feb – 24 Nov	Pyrrhic victory for the Yan against Tang forces.
759	Byzantine–Bulgarian Wars	Battle of the Rishki Pass	(Serbia)		Bulgar Khan Vinekh defeats a Byzantine army in a mountain pass.
760		Siege of Nandigrama	(India)		Pandya King Maravarman Rajasimha I defeats Pallava under Nandivarman II.
760		Battle of Venbai	(India)		Pandya defeat Western Chalukyas and annex the southern territory of their kingdom.
762	Alid revolt of 762–763	Battle of Bakhamra	(Iraq)	Sep 762—Feb 763	The Abbasids under Isa ibn Musa crush an Alid rebel army under Ibrahim ibn Abdallah.
763	Byzantine–Bulgarian Wars	Battle of Anchialus	(Bulgaria)	30 June	The Bulgar Khan Telets is defeated by the Byzantine Emperor Constantine V.
766	Arab–Byzantine Wars	Siege of Kamacha	(Turkey)	Autumn	Unsuccessful attack on the Byzantine border fortress of Kamacha by the Abbasids.
770	Dano-Swedish wars	Battle of Brávellir	(Sweden)		Swedes allied with Western Geats defeat Danes allied with Eastern Geats.
772	Muslim conquest of the Maghreb	Battle of Janbi	(Morocco)		Rustamid state established in Morocco.
773		Siege of Pavia	(Italy)	Sep 773—June 774	Franks under Charlemagne decisively defeat the Lombards and annex northern Italy.
774	Byzantine–Bulgarian Wars	Battle of Litosoria	(Turkey)	Oct	Byzantine Empire under Constantine V defeat the Bulgars under Telerig.
774	Byzantine–Bulgarian Wars	Battle of Berzitia	(Greece)		Superior Byzantine forces led by Constantine V crush a Bulgar army led by Khan Telerig.
774	Reconquista	Battle of Montecubeiro	(Spain)		King Silo of Asturias defeats Galician rebels.
775		Battle of Bagrevand	(Turkey)	25 April	The Abbasid Caliphate defeats a major Armenian rebellion and kills its leaders. Muslim control over Transcaucasia is solidified, while several major Armenian nakharar families lose power and flee to the Byzantine Empire.
778	Reconquista	Battle of Roncesvalles	(Spain) (France)	15 Aug	Basques defeat an invading Frankish army. Roland, Paladin of Charlemagne, dies.
779	Anglo-Saxon settlement of Britain	Battle of Bensington	(England)		Mercia decisively defeats Wessex.
782	Saxon Wars	Battle of Suntel	(Germany)		Saxons kill a detachment of Frankish forces.
783	Saxon Wars	Battle on the Hase	(Germany)	Late summer	Franks under Charlemagne defeat the Saxons under Widukind.
783		Siege of Fengtian	(China)	Oct	Emperor Dezong of Tang fends off coup that sieges the Tang capital by General Zhu Ci.
786	Alid Uprising	Battle of Fakhkh	(Saudi Arabia)	11 June	A Hasanid Alid uprising in Mecca is crushed by the Abbasids. Idris ibn Abdallah flees to the Maghreb, where he later founds the Idrisid dynasty.
788	Arab–Byzantine Wars	Battle of Kopidnadon	(Turkey)	Sep	Abbasid forces defeat Byzantine forces.
789	Thirty-Eight Years' War	Battle of Sufuse	(Japan)		Japanese army defeated by the Isawa Emishi under their general Aterui. Much of the imperial army drowned in the Koromo River.
791	Saxon Wars	Battle of Raab	(Hungary)		Charlemagne defeats the Avars and as a result subdues Pannonia into vassalage.
791	Reconquista	Battle of the Burbia River	(Spain)		Córdoba defeats Asturias.
791		Battle of Ganges-Yamuna Doab	(India)		Rashtrakuta King Dhruva Dharavarsha defeats Vatsaraja of the Gurjara Pratihara Empire and Dharmapala of the Pala Empire for control over Kannauj in the Doab by the Ganges and Yamuna rivers.
792	Byzantine–Bulgarian wars	Battle of Marcellae	(Bulgaria)		The Bulgar Khan Kardam defeats a Byzantine army under Emperor Constantine VI.
793	Reconquista	Battle of Orbieu River	(France)	28 March/Summer	The Umayyad state of Córdoba defeats the Frankish Empire.
794	Reconquista	Battle of Lutos	(Spain)		Asturias defeats Córdoba.
795	Saxon Wars	Battle of Lüne and the Elbe	(Germany)		Franks under Charlemagne defeat the Obotrite Slavs under Witzlaus, who was killed by his own men while crossing the Elbe.
798	Saxon Wars	Battle of Bornhöved	(Germany)		The Obotrites under prince Thrasco and the Frankish Empire under Eburisus defeat the Nordalbingian Saxons.
799		Siege of Trsat	(Croatia)	Autumn	Croatia decisively defeats an invading Frankish force led by Eric of Friuli, who dies in the conflict.

== 9th century ==
Year	War	Battle	Loc.	Date(s)	Description
800	Reconquista	Siege of Barcelona	(Spain)	Oct 800—4 April 801	Carolingians under Louis the Pious conquer Barcelona from the Emirate of Córdoba.
801		Battle of Weizhou	(China)	801—802	Tang Chinese forces decisively defeat Tibetan forces in the South-West front.
803		Siege of Gaochang	(China)		The Uyghur Khaganate annexed oasis city of Gaochang, which they renamed Qocho.
804	Arab–Byzantine Wars	Battle of Krasos	(Turkey)	Aug/Sep	Abbasids under Ibrahim ibn Jibril surprise and defeat the Byzantine emperor Nikephoros I.
808	Reconquista	Siege of Tortosa	(Spain)	808—809	The Umayyads repel the Carolingian army under Louis the Pious.
809	Byzantine–Bulgarian Wars	Siege of Serdica	(Bulgaria)	Spring	Bulgar Khan Krum seizes the fortified Byzantine town of Serdica, nowadays Sofia.
811	Fourth Fitna	Battle of Rayy	(Iran)	1 May	Abbasid Civil War ends with Al-Ma'mun defeating his half-brother Al-Amin, who dies in this battle.
811	Byzantine–Bulgarian Wars	Battle of Pliska	(Bulgaria)	26 July	Nikephoros I of the Byzantine Empire captures and destroys the Bulgar capital, Pliska, only to be crushingly defeated and killed a few days later by the Bulgar khan Krum.
812	Byzantine–Bulgarian Wars	Siege of Develtos	(Bulgaria)	May—June	Bulgar Khan Krum besieges ancient city of Develtos, Thrace. Decisive victory for Krum – the population of Develtos are deported to Bulgarian territories.
813	Byzantine–Bulgarian Wars	Battle of Versinikia	(Bulgaria) / (Turkey)	22 June	The Bulgars of Krum defeat the Byzantines of Emperor Michael I Rangabe.
814		Battle of Burdizon			A Bulgar force led by the new Khan Omurtag is defeated by a Byzantine army of Emperor Leo V. A peace treaty follows as a result.
816	Reconquista	Battle of Pancorbo	(Spain)		Emirate of Cordoba decisively defeats invading forces of Asturias and the Basques, killing all commanders against Cordoba.
816	Gurjara–Gauda War	Battle of Monghyr	(India)		Pratihara King Nagabhata II decisively defeats Pala Empire under Dharmapala, ending the Tripartite Struggle.
819		Battle of Kupa	(Slovenia) or (Croatia)		Duke Ljudevit of the Slavs in Lower Pannonia defeats duke Borna of Croatia.
819		Battle of Yanzhou	(China)		Tang Chinese forces decisively defeat Tibetan forces in the North-West front.
822	Rebellion of Thomas the Slav	Battle of Kedouktos	(Turkey)	Oct or Nov	The Bulgars of Khan Omurtag attack the Byzantine rebel Thomas the Slav as a favour to Byzantine Emperor Michael II, but are defeated.
824	Reconquista	Battle of Roncevaux Pass	(Spain)		King Íñigo Arista of Pamplona and leader Musa ibn Musa al-Qasawi of the Banu Qasi defeat the Frankish Empire under count Aeblus and duke Aznar Sánchez of Gascony.
825	Reconquista	Battle of Anceo	(Spain)		King Alfonso II of Asturias defeats the Umayyad state of Córdoba.
825	Anglo-Saxon settlement of Britain	Battle of Ellandun	(England)		Egbert of Wessex defeats Beornwulf of Mercia, ending Mercian supremacy.
829	Arab–Byzantine Wars	Battle of Thasos	(Greece)	829	The Cretan Saracens defeat the Byzantines off Thasos.
829	Tang-Nanzhao Conflicts	Siege of Chengdu	(China)		Tang dynasty defeats invasion by Nanzhao.
830		Battle of Tellaru	(India)		Pallavas defeat the Pandyas.
831	Bashmurian revolts	al-Maʾmūn campaign against Bashmur	(Egypt)		Abbasid victory over the rebel Copts
832	Pictish-Northumbrian conflicts	Battle of Athelstaneford	(Scotland)		Semi-legendary battle where the Picts defeated Northumbria.
838	Arab–Byzantine wars	Battle of Anzen	(Turkey)	22 July	Theophilus is defeated by the Abbasids in modern Turkey.
838	Viking invasions of England	Battle of Hingston Down	(England)		Egbert of Wessex defeats a Cornish and Viking army, ending Cornish independence.
838	Arab–Byzantine wars	Sack of Amorium	(Turkey)	Aug	Abbasids take and raze Byzantine city.
841	Carolingian civil war	Battle of Fontenoy	(France)	25 June	Charles the Bald and Louis the German defeat emperor Lothair I in the Carolingian civil war.
842		Battle of the Bridge of Cornellana	(Spain)		Ramiro I of Asturias defeats Nepotian of Asturias, during a civil war in Asturias.
843	Franco-Breton wars	Battle of Messac	(France)	24 May	Franks under count Renaud of Nantes defeat the Bretons under Nominoe and prefect Lambert II of the Breton March.
843	Franco-Breton wars	Battle of Blain	(France)	24 May	Bretons of the Duchy of Brittany defeat Renaud of Nantes.
844	Viking expansion	Battle of Tablada	(Spain)	25 Sep—11 or 17 Nov	Emirate of Cordoba decisively repels Viking raid on Seville.
844	Arab–Byzantine Wars	Battle of Mauropotamos	(Turkey)		Abbasids defeat the Byzantines.
844	Carolingian civil war	Battle of Toulouse	(France)		King Pepin II of Aquitaine defeats king Charles the Bald of West Francia.
845	Viking expansion	Siege of Paris	(France)	28/29 March	Vikings plunder and occupy Paris, leaving for 7,000 pounds of silver and gold.
845	Franco-Breton wars	Battle of Ballon	(France)	22 Nov	Charles the Bald of West Frankish Kingdom is defeated by the Bretons of Nominoe.
847	Viking incursions into Gascony	Siege of Bordeaux	(France)	847—848	Vikings plunder and occupy Bordeaux.
849		Battle of Ostia	(Italy)	Summer	An Italian alliance fleet defeats Saracen pirates.
851	Franco-Breton wars	Battle of Jengland	(France)	22 Aug	Bretons under Duke Erispoe defeat king Charles the Bald of West Francia.
851	Reconquista	Battle of Albelda	(Spain)		The Umayyad state of Córdoba defeats West Francia.
852	Croatian–Bulgarian wars	Croatian–Bulgarian battle of 852	(Bosnia and Herzegovina)		Indecisive battle between Croatia and Bulgaria
853	Arab-Byzantine wars	Sack of Damietta	(Egypt)	22-24 May	Byzantine navy successfully raids Abbasid port city.
853	Reconquista	Battle of Jándula	(Spain)		Rebels of Toledo defeat the Umayyad state of Córdoba.
854	Reconquista	Battle of Guadalacete	(Spain)		Emir Muhammad I of Córdoba defeats king Ordoño I of Asturias, king García Íñiguez of Pamplona, leader Musa ibn Musa al-Qasawi of the Banu Qasi and Ibn Balyus.
856	Viking incursions into Gascony	Siege of Paris	(France)	856—857	Danish Vikings capture and plunder Paris, capital of West Francia again.
859/860	Reconquista	Battle of Monte Laturce	(Spain)		King Ordoño I of Asturias and king García Íñiguez of Pamplona defeat leader Musa ibn Musa al-Qasawi of the Banu Qasi.
860	Rus'–Byzantine Wars	Siege of Constantinople	(Turkey)	18 June – 4 Aug	Rus' Khaganate raids the suburbs outside Constantinople.
861	Viking incursions into Gascony	Siege of Paris	(France)	Jan	Danish Vikings capture and plunder Paris.
863	Tang-Nanzhao war in Annan	Siege of Songping	(Vietnam)	14 Jan – 1 March	Nanzhao captures Songping (modern Hanoi) from the Tang
863	Arab–Byzantine wars	Battle of Lalakaon	(Turkey)	3 Sep	Byzantines under Michael III defeat the Emirate of Melitene forces decisively.
865	Reconquista	Battle of the Morcuera	(Spain)	9 Aug	Cordoba defeats Asturias and Castile.
866	Frankish–Viking battles and Franco-Breton wars	Battle of Brissarthe	(France)	2 Jul	Bretons and Vikings under Salomon, Duke of Brittany and Hastein defeat Franks. Robert the Strong and Ranulf I of Aquitaine die in the battle.
867	Viking invasions of England	Battle of York	(England)	21 March	Great Heathen Army defeats and occupies Northumbria, executes King Aella of Northumbria, and establishes the Danelaw.
868	Viking invasions of England	Siege of Nottingham	(England)		Great Heathen Army seizes Nottingham and defeats the combined forces of Mercia and Wessex.
869	Zanj Rebellion	Battle of the Barges	(Iraq)	24 Oct	Zanj rebels defeat militia trying to quell their rebellion.
870	Viking invasions of England	Battle of Englefield	(England)	31 Dec	Anglo-Saxons under Æthelwulf defeat the Danelaw Vikings.
870	Muslim conquest of Sicily	Siege of Melite	(Malta)		Aghlabids under Sawāda Ibn Muḥammad capture the Byzantine city of Melite.
870	Hindu Shahi-Saffarid wars	First Battle of Kabul	(Afghanistan)		Saffarids under Ya'qub ibn al-Layth al-Saffar defeat the Hindu Shahis.
870	Zanj Rebellion	Battle of al-Ubulla	(Iraq)	28 June	Zanj defeat Abbasid forces and sack city of Al-Ubulla.
871	Viking invasions of England	Battle of Reading	(England)	4 Jan	Ethelred of Wessex and Alfred the Great are defeated by a Danish army, suffering heavy losses.
871	Zanj Rebellion	Battle of Basra	(Iraq)	7–10 Sep	Zanj defeat Abbasid forces and sack city of Basra.
872		Battle of the Vltava River	(Czech Republic)	Spring	East Francia under Liutbert (archbishop of Mainz) defeats the Bohemians under Svatoslav, Witizla, Heriman, Spytimír, Mojslav and duke Bořivoj I of Bohemia.
872	Unification of Norway	Battle of Hafrsfjord	(Norway)	between 872 and 900	Harald Fairhair takes over great parts of Norway; the country of Norway is regarded to be founded after the battle.
872	Byzantine–Paulician wars	Battle of Bathys Ryax	(Turkey)	872 or 878	The Byzantine Empire defeats the Paulician heretics, killing their leader Chrysocheir. May also have occurred in 878.
c. 872/3	Arab–Byzantine wars	Battle of Kardia	(Turkey)		Byzantine admiral Niketas Ooryphas defeats a fleet of Cretan Saracens under the renegade Photios.
c. 873	Arab–Byzantine wars	Battle of the Gulf of Corinth	(Greece)		Byzantine admiral Niketas Ooryphas defeats a fleet of Cretan Saracens and kills their commander, the renegade Photios. Possibly occurred as late as 879.
876		Battle of Dayr al-'Aqul	(Iraq)	8 April	Abbasids defeat Saffarid dynasty near the Tigris River.
876	Franco-Breton wars	Battle of Andernach	(Germany)	8 Oct	King Louis the Younger of East Francia defeats the invading army of emperor Charles the Bald.
878	Viking invasions of England	Battle of Edington	(England)	May	West Saxons under Alfred the Great defeat the Danelaw Vikings.
878	Viking invasions of England	Battle of Cynwit	(England)		West Saxons, said to have been under the command of a certain ealdorman named Odda, defeat a Viking army, killing their leader, an unnamed man who may have been identical to Ubba.
878	Viking invasions of England		(England)		Vikings defeat forces of St Cuthbert in West Sussex.
878	Reconquista	Battle of Polvoraria	(Spain)		King Alfonso III of Asturias defeats emir Muhammad I of Córdoba.
879		Battle of Thirupurambiyam	(India)		Pallavas and Cholas defeat Pandya kingdom in Southern India. Cholas become most prominent regional power soon after this.
880		Battle of Lüneburg Heath	(Germany)	2 Feb	Vikings of the Great Heathen Army defeat the Franks under Louis the Younger.
880	Frankish–Viking battles	Battle of Thimeon	(Belgium)	Feb	Franks under Louis the Younger march on and defeat Vikings.
880		Siege of Vienne	(France)	880—882	The Frankish army under Charles the Fat, Louis III and Carloman II fail to take the capital of king Boso of Provence.
880		Battle of Attigny	(France)		A Frankish army defeats a rebel army of self-proclaimed king Boso of Provence.
880	Arab–Byzantine wars	Battle of Cephalonia	(Greece)		Byzantine admiral Nasar defeats an Aghlabid fleet in a night attack off western Greece.
880	Arab–Byzantine wars	Battle of Stelai	(Italy)		Byzantine admiral Nasar defeats an Aghlabid fleet off southern Italy.
880	Arab–Byzantine wars	Battle of Taranto	(Italy)		The Byzantines under Leo Apostyppes capture Taranto from the Muslims.
881	Muslim conquest of Sicily	Battle of Taormina	(Italy)	Spring	The Aghlabids under al-Hasan ibn al-Abbas defeat the Byzantines under Barsakios near Taormina.
881	Frankish–Viking battles	Battle of Saucourt-en-Vimeu	(France)	3 Aug	Franks under Louis III of France and Carloman II decisively defeat Danish Vikings.
881	Muslim conquest of Sicily	Battle of Caltavuturo	(Italy)	881 or 882	The Byzantines under Mosilikes defeat the Aghlabids under Abu Thawr.
881		Battle of the Conwy	(Wales)		Anarawd ap Rhodri defeats the Mercians under Æthelred, Lord of the Mercians. Known in Welsh as Dial Rhodri: the Avenging of Rhodri.
881	Zanj Rebellion	Siege of al-Mukhtarah	(Iraq)	881 to August 883	Abbasid forces defeat the Zanj rebels killing their leader and ending the rebellion.
882	Viking raids in the Rhineland	Battle of Remich	(Luxembourg)	11 April	Danish Vikings under Godfrid and Sigfrid defeat the Franks under Archbishop Wala of Metz, Archbishop Bertulf of Trier and count Adalhard of Metz.
882	Frankish–Viking battles and Dano-German Conflicts	Siege of Asselt	(Netherlands)		Franks defeat Viking camp, whose leader Godfrid made to become Frankish vassal and convert to Christianity.
882	Reconquista	First Battle of Cellorigo	(Spain)		Spanish defeat Cordoba.
883	Abbasid decline	Battle of Mecca	(Saudi Arabia)	13 June	Abbasids defeat Tulunid army trying to gain control of the city.
884		Battle of Norditi	(Germany)	Autumn	Frisia under Archbishop Rimbert of Bremen-Hamburg makes an army of Danish Vikings retreat from East Frisia.
885	Abbasid–Tulunid wars	Battle of Tawahin	(Israel)	5/6 April	Tulunids defeat Abbasid attempt at recovering Syria and Egypt.
885	Frankish–Viking battles	Siege of Paris	(France)	25 Nov 885—Oct 886	Franks defend Paris decisively from Viking siege, Vikings granted passage of the Seine and given 700 pounds of silver.
886	Viking invasions of England	Siege of London	(England)		Alfred the Great recaptures London.
887	Croatian–Venetian wars	Battle of Makarska	(Croatia)	18 Sep	A fleet under Branimir, Duke of Croatia defeats doge Pietro I Candiano of Venice.
891	Frankish–Viking battles	Battle of Leuven	(Belgium)	Sep	Arnulf of the Franks defeats a Viking army, ending their invasion.
893	Viking invasions of England	Battle of Buttington	(Wales)		An army of Mercians, West Saxons, and Welsh led by Æthelred, Lord of the Mercians defeats a Viking army.
894		Battle of Doghs	(Armenia)		King Smbat I of Armenia defeats commander Yusuf ibn Abi'l-Saj of Azerbaijan
894		Battle of Niravadyapura	(India)		Eastern Chalukyas defeat Rashtrakutas under Krishna II.
894		Battle of Peruvanguru	(India)		Eastern Chalukyas defeat Rashtrakutas under Krishna II.
896	Byzantine–Bulgarian war of 894–896	Battle of Bulgarophygon	(Turkey)	Summer	During the summer the Bulgars led by Prince Simeon I defeat a Byzantine army decisively.
896	Byzantine–Bulgarian war of 894–896	Battle of Southern Buh	(Ukraine)		Bulgarians defeat Magyars, who abandon the area and migrate westwards.
896		Siege of Dorostolon	(Bulgaria)		The Bulgars under their princes Boris-Michael and his son Symeon finally break a Magyar siege.
897		Battle of Qingkou	(China)	29 Nov	Forces loyal to Yang Xingmi defeat forces of fellow warlord Zhu Wen.
899	Hungarian invasions of Europe	Battle of Brenta	(Italy)	24 Sep	Hungarians decisively defeat the Kingdom of Italy.

== 10th century ==
Year	War	Battle	Loc.	Date(s)	Description
900		Battle of Balkh	(Afghanistan)		Samanids defeat the Saffarid dynasty and annex Balkh and the rest of the cities in Khurasan.
902	Muslim conquest of Sicily	Siege of Taormina	(Italy)	July—1 Aug	The former Aghlabid emir, Ibrahim II, captures the fortress of Taormina from the Byzantine Empire.
902	Æthelwold's Revolt	Battle of the Holme	(England)	13 December	Danelaw and East Anglia win phyrric victory over Wessex and Kent, Æthelwold's Revolt put down after he's KIA.
903		Battle of Hama	(Syria)	29 Nov	The Abbasid army under Muhammad ibn Sulayman al-Katib deals a crushing defeat on the Qarmatians under the Sahib al-Shama.
904	Arab–Byzantine Wars	Sack of Thessalonica	(Greece)		Saracens under Leo of Tripoli sack the Byzantine Empire's second-largest city.
907	Hungarian conquest of the Carpathian Basin	Battle of Pozsony	(Slovakia) / (Hungary)	4–6 July	(also known as the Battle of Pressburg) - Hungarians completely defeat East Francia and expand their military control to River Enns.
908	Hungarian invasions of Europe	Battle of Eisenach	(Germany)	3 Aug	Hungarians decisively defeat Franco-German army from Franconia, Saxony, and Thuringia.
909	Five Dynasties and Ten Kingdoms period	Battle of Jisu	(China)		Warlord Liu Shouguang defeats his brother Liu Shouwen
910	Hungarian invasions of Europe	Battle of Lechfeld	(Germany)	12 June	Hungarians decisively defeat Louis the Child's united Frankish Imperial Army, devastating East Francia.
910	Hungarian invasions of Europe	Battle of Rednitz	(Germany)	22 June	Hungarians deliver another devastating defeat to East Francia and the German kingdoms near the River Rednitz.
910	Viking invasions of England	Battle of Tettenhall	(England)	5 Aug	Between Edward the Elder and the Yorkshire Danes. The Danish were defeated.
910		Battle of Dzknavachar	(Armenia)		Emir Yusuf ibn Abi'l-Saj of Azerbaijan and king Gagik I Artsruni of the Kingdom of Vaspurakan defeat commander Ashot of Armenia and king Mushegh I Bagratuni of the Kingdom of Syunik.
911	Frankish–Viking battles	Siege of Chartres	(France)	20 July	Vikings under Rollo defeated by the Franks, who afterwards bargain to give Rollo the Duchy of Normandy in exchange for vassalage and religious conversion.
911		Battle of Vallala	(India)		Cholas led by Parantaka I decisively defeat the Rashtrakutas.
913	Hungarian invasions of Europe	Battle of the Inn	(Germany)		Duchies of Bavaria and Swabia defeat Hungarian raiding party.
915	Arab–Byzantine Wars	Battle of Garigliano	(Italy)	June	Christian League defeats the Saracen bands in southern Lazio.
915	Viking invasions of Ireland	Battle of Confey	(Republic of Ireland)	915—917	Vikings defeat Leinster and kill their king.
915		Battle of Vellore	(India)		Chola Empire under Parantaka I defeats the combined forces of the Pandya Kingdom and the Sri Lankan Anuradhapura Kingdom.
916		Sack of Kannauj	(India)		Rashtrakutas sack Kannauj, the capital of the Gurjara-Pratihara dynasty.
917	Viking invasions of England	Battle of Derby	(England)	July	Anglo-Saxons defeat the Danelaw Vikings.
917	Byzantine–Bulgarian wars and Byzantine–Bulgarian war of 913–927	Battle of Acheloos	(Bulgaria)	20 Aug	A large-scale Byzantine invasion against Bulgaria is decisively defeated by Tzar Simeon I of Bulgaria.
917	Viking invasions of Ireland	Battle of Mag Femen	(Republic of Ireland)	22 Aug	Strategic Viking victory against the Irish of Ui Niell.
917	Byzantine–Bulgarian war of 913–927	Battle of Katasyrtai	(Turkey)	Autumn	Bulgarians defeat Byzantine Empire in village in proximity to Constantinople.
917	Reconquista	Battle of San Esteban de Gormaz	(Spain)		León defeats Córdoba.
918	Viking invasions of England	Battle of Corbridge	(England)		Stalemate between Norse and Kingdom of Scotland.
919	Five Dynasties and Ten Kingdoms period	Battle of Langshan Jiang	(China)	10 May	State of Wuyue decisively defeats Wu. First documented use of a type of flamethrower.
919	Viking invasions of Ireland	Battle of Islandbridge	(Republic of Ireland)	14 Sep	Vikings of Dublin decisively defeat the Irish kingdoms trying to drive them off the continent, killing six Irish kings.
919	Hungarian invasions of Europe	Battle of Püchen	(Germany)		Hungarians defeat new German King Henry the Fowler.
919		Battle of Winterthur	(Switzerland)		The army of Burchard II, Duke of Swabia defeats the army of Rudolph II, King of Upper Burgundy.
920	Reconquista	Battle of Valdejunquera	(Spain)	26 July	Cordoba defeats Leon and Navarre.
921	Byzantine–Bulgarian war of 913–927	Battle of Pegae	(Turkey)	March	Bulgarians decisively defeat Byzantines near Constantinople.
921	Arab-Byzantine wars	Battle of Sevan	(Armenia)		Kingdom of Armenia defeats the Iranian Sajid dynasty.
923		Battle of Soissons	(France)	15 June	Rollo of Normandy killed by Charles III, but Charles is defeated and imprisoned by Rudolf, Duke of Burgundy who succeeded Robert.
923		Battle of Firenzuola	(Italy)	29 July	King Rudolph II of Burgundy and margrave Adalbert I of Ivrea defeat emperor Berengar I, who is dethroned and Rudolph is given the title King of Italy.
923	Qarmatian—Abbasid wars	Sack of Basra	(Iraq)	11–28 Aug	Qarmatians of Bahrayn sack the Abbasid city of Basra.
925	Croatian–Hungarian Wars	Battle of Drava River	(Croatia)		Croatia defeats Hungary
926	Croatian–Bulgarian wars	Battle of the Bosnian Highlands	(Bosnia and Herzegovina)		Simeon I of Bulgaria sent an army under Alogobotur against the Byzantine ally Croatia, but this army was defeated by King Tomislav of Croatia. Fearing a Bulgarian retribution, Tomislav accepted to abandon his union with Byzantium and make peace on the basis of the status quo, negotiated by the papal legate Madalbert.
927		Sack of Gyeongju	(South Korea)		Gyeongju, the capital of Silla is sacked by Kyon Hwon the King of Later Baekje. King Gyeongae of Silla commits suicide, and Baekje installs Gyeongsun of Silla intended as a puppet.
928	Qarmatian invasion of Iraq	Qarmatian raid into Upper Mesopotamia	(Iraq)		Qarmatians victory
929	Hungarian invasions of Europe	Siege of Gana	(Germany)	Early 929	A German army commanded by king Henry the Fowler captures the Glomatian fort of Gana.
929	Hungarian invasions of Europe	Battle of Lenzen	(Germany)	4 Sep	Duchy of Saxony defeats the Slavic Veleti and Obotrites.
930	Qarmatian—Abbasid wars	Sack of Mecca	(Saudi Arabia)	11 Jan	Qarmatians sack Mecca and plunder the Kaaba.
930		Battle of Gochang	(South Korea)		Goryeo decisively defeats the forces of Later Baekje.
933	Hungarian invasions of Europe	Battle of Riade	(Germany)	15 March	Henry the Fowler, Holy Roman Emperor defeats Magyars.
934	Hungarian invasions of Europe	Battle of W.l.n.d.r	(Serbia)	March or April	Hungarians and Pechenegs defeat Byzantines and Bulgarians.
934		Battle of Unju Castle	(South Korea)	Sep	Forces of Goryeo led by Wang Geon allied with Silla decisively defeat Later Baekje again.
936		Battle of Illicheon	(South Korea)	Sep	Goryeo led by Wang Geon conquers Later Baekje.
937	Viking invasions of England	Battle of Brunanburh	(England)		Athelstan of England defeats a combined Norse-Celtic force.
938	Five Dynasties and Ten Kingdoms	Battle of Bạch Đằng	(Vietnam)	Autumn	Ngô Quyền defeats Southern Han.
939	Reconquista	Battle of Simancas	(Spain)	19 July	Caliph Abd-ar-Rahman III of Córdoba is defeated by a combined Hispanic-Christian force.
939	Frankish–Viking battles and Franco-Breton wars	Battle of Trans-la-Forêt	(France)	1 Aug	Bretons drive Vikings out of Brittany and found the Duchy of Brittany right after.
939		Battle of Andernach	(Germany)	2 Oct	The royal German army defeats the rebel dukes Eberhard of Franconia and Gilbert of Lorraine.
940	Samanid–Ziyarid Wars	Battle of Iskhabad	(Iran)	25 Dec	Samanid Empire defeats Ziyarid dynasty and Firuzanids.
941	Rus'-Byzantine Wars	Siege of Constantinople	(Turkey)		Byzantine Empire repelled Rus' attack.
942	Hungarian invasions of Europe	Battle of Fraxinet	(France)	20 May	Hungarian raiding army defeat the Muslim frontier state of Fraxinet and they continued on their way to Hispania. Their victory laid the foundation of a successful Italian–Byzantine campaign against the Muslims in the Mediterranean.
942		Battle of al-Mada'in	(Iraq)	16–19 Aug	Hamdanid dynasty defeats Baridis for control over Baghdad.
942	Hungarian invasions of Europe	Battle of Baltarga	(Spain)		Combined Catalan forces defeat a group of Hungarian raiders.
943	Hungarian invasions of Europe	Battle of Wels	(Austria)	10/12 Aug	Bavarians and Carantanians defeat Principality of Hungary.
943	Caspian expeditions of the Rus'	Siege of Bardha'a	(Azerbaijan)		Rus' under Igor of Kiev defeat the army of Marzuban ibn Muhammad then take the capital of Sallarid Caucasian Albania in modern-day Azerbaijan, killing many of the inhabitants and occupying it for a few months before leaving.
946	Buyid-Hamdanid Wars	Battle of Baghdad	(Iraq)	April—Aug	Buyid dynasty defeats Hamdanid dynasty.
946		Battle of Rouen	(France)		Hugh the Great, Count of Paris and Richard I of Normandy, Count of Rouen, defeat king Louis IV of France, Arnulf I, Count of Flanders and Otto the Great, Holy Roman Emperor.
946		Fall of Ayodhyapura	(Thailand)		Khmer Empire led by Rajendravarman II destroys the capital of the Lavo Kingdom after decisively defeating the Lavo and Champa.
948	Krishna's Southern Expedition	Battle of Takkolam	(India)	948—949	Rashtrakuta dynasty decisively defeats Chola Empire, Rajaditya Chola killed in battle.
953	Arab–Byzantine Wars	Battle of Marash	(Turkey)		The Hamdanid Emir of Aleppo, Sayf al-Dawla, scores a major victory over the Byzantines under Bardas Phokas the Elder.
955	Hungarian invasions of Europe	Battle of Lechfeld	(Germany)	10–12 Aug	Otto I, Holy Roman Emperor defeats Magyars, ending their invasion of the West.
955	Hungarian invasions of Europe	Battle on the Raxa	(Germany)	16 Oct	Otto I, Holy Roman Emperor defeats Obotrites, Veleti, and allied Slavs.
955	Later Zhou conquest of Huainan	Siege of Shouzhou	(China)	955—957	Later Zhou decisively defeats Southern Tang
956			(Turkey)	Sep/Oct	A Byzantine fleet under Basil Hexamilites deals a crushing defeat on the fleet of Tarsus.
958	Arab–Byzantine Wars	Battle of Raban	(Turkey)	Oct/Nov	The Byzantines under John Tzimiskes defeat the Hamdanid Emir of Aleppo, Sayf al-Dawla.
959	Fatimid campaigns in the western Maghreb (958–960)	Siege of Fez	(Morocco)	Winter 958-November 959	Fatimid Caliphate with Zirid help annexes Fez from the Emirate of Sijilmasa.
960	Fatimid campaigns in the western Maghreb (958–960)	Siege of Sijilmasa	(Morocco)		Fatimid Caliphate under Jawhar with Zirid help annexes the Emirate of Sijilmasa's capital of Sijilmasa.
960	Arab-Byzantine Wars	Battle of Andrassos	(Turkey)	8 Nov	The Byzantines under Leo Phokas the Younger score a crushing victory over the Hamdanid Emir of Aleppo, Sayf al-Dawla.
960	Arab-Byzantine Wars	Siege of Chandax	(Greece)	960—6 March 961	The Byzantines reconquer Crete from the Cretan Saracens.
960	Hungarian-Serbian War	Battle of Drina	(Bosnia and Herzegovina) / (Serbia)		Serbian victory, Hungarian leader named Kisa was defeated by Časlav, the Prince of Serbia
960	Hungarian-Serbian War	Battle of Syrmia	(Croatia) / (Serbia)		Hungarian victory, a Hungarian army defeated Časlav, the Prince of Serbia by avenge of the widow of Kisa
962	Viking invasions of Scotland	Battle of Bauds	(Scotland)		Indulf of Scotland is killed in battle with Danish pirates.
962	Muslim conquest of Sicily	Siege of Taormina	(Italy)	25 Nov – 25 Dec	The Kalbids capture the fortress of Taormina from the Byzantine Empire on behalf of the Fatimid Caliphate.
965	Arab–Byzantine wars	Battle of the Straits	(Italy)	Early 965	The Fatimid fleet deals a crushing defeat on the Byzantine fleet under Niketas Abalantes.
965	Muslim conquest of Sicily	Siege of Rometta	(Italy)	May	Fatimids defeat Byzantines and consolidate Sicily.
965	Rus'–Khazar Wars	Siege of Sarkel	(Russia)		Kievan Rus' under Sviatoslav I captures and razes Khazar fortress of Sarkel.
967	Polish–Veletian War	Battle of Mieszko I against Wichmann the Younger and the Wolinians	(Poland)	21/22 Sep	Duke Mieszko I of Poland and the Duchy of Bohemia defeat the Veleti and the Wolinians under Wichmann the Younger.
968	Rus'–Khazar Wars	Battle of Silistra	(Bulgaria)	Spring	Sviatoslav I of Kiev defeats Bulgaria.
968	Arab–Byzantine wars	Siege of Antioch	(Turkey)	Nov 968—28 Oct 969	Byzantines retake city of Antioch from the Hamdanids.
968		Siege of Kiev	(Ukraine)		Pecheneg siege of Kievan Rus' successfully lifted by the general Pretich.
969	Rus'–Bulgarian Wars	Capture of Preslav	(Bulgaria)		Sviatoslav I of Kiev captures Preslav, the Bulgarian capital.
969	Caspian expeditions of the Rus'	Sack of Atil	(Russia)		Sviatoslav I of Kiev sacks and razes the capital of the Khazars, conquering the Khazar state for Kievan Rus'
969	Fatimid conquest of Egypt	Occupation of Fustat	(Egypt)	26 June-9 July	Fatimid forces under Jawhar take over the Fustat the capital of Egypt at the time .
970	Rus'–Byzantine Wars	Battle of Arcadiopolis	(Turkey)	March	Bardas Skleros defeats a Russo-Bulgarian-Magyar-Pecheneg army.
971	Arab–Byzantine Wars	Battle of Alexandretta	(Turkey)	Late spring	Byzantines defeat a Fatimid army near Alexandretta, forcing them to lift their siege of Antioch.
971	Arab–Byzantine Wars	Siege of Antioch	(Turkey)	December 970-July 971	Fatimid siege on Byzantines lifted after counterattack at Alexandretta.
971	Rus'–Byzantine Wars	Battle of Dorostolon	(Bulgaria)		Byzantine emperor John Tzimiskes defeats the Rus'.
971	Viking expansion	Battle of the Cebreiro Mountains	(Spain)		Spanish defeat Vikings.
972	Polish–German Wars	Battle of Cedynia	(Poland)	24 June	Mieszko I of Poland defeated Hodon of Germany.
972		Sack of Manyakheta	(India)		Paramara King Siyaka plunders the capital of the Rashtrakuta Empire, leading to their swift decline.
973		Battle of Tourtour	(France)		Count William I of Provence and margrave Arduin of Turin defeat the Saracens of Fraxinetum.
977		Battle of the Yarkon River	(Israel)		Fatimid general Jawhar decisively defeated by combined forces of Buyid general Alptakin, Qarmatians and Banu Tayy tribes.
978		Battle of Tawahin	(Syria)	15 Aug	Caliph al-Aziz Billah of the Fatimid Caliphate defeats Alptakin, the emirate of Damascus and the Qarmatians.
978 or 979	Rebellion of Bardas Skleros	Battle of Pankaleia	(Turkey)		The rebel Byzantine general Bardas Skleros defeated the loyalist commander Bardas Phokas the Younger.
980	Viking invasions of Ireland	Battle of Tara	(Republic of Ireland)		Irish of the Kingdom of Meath defeat the Norse.
981	Song–Đại Cồ Việt war	Battle of Bạch Đằng	(Vietnam)	Jan—April	Former Le defeated the Song dynasty.
981	Reconquista	Battle of Torrevicente	(Spain)	9 July	Almanzor defeats Ghalib ibn Abd al-Rahman, king Ramiro Garcés of Viguera and count García Fernández of Castile.
981	Civil war in Brittany	Battle of Conquereuil	(France)		Indecisive battle between Conan I of Rennes, supported by the Duchy of Normandy and Hoël I, Duke of Brittany, supported by the County of Anjou.
981	Reconquista	Battle of Rueda	(Spain)		Cordoba defeats Leon, Castile, and Navarre.
982		Battle of Crotone	(Italy)	13 or 14 July	Emperor Otto II, Holy Roman Emperor is defeated by a Kalbid army .
982	Viking incursions into Gascony	Battle of Taller	(France)		Duke William Sánchez of Gascony defeats Vikings.
985	Reconquista	Battle of Rovirans	(Spain)		Chancellor Almanzor of the Umayyad state of Córdoba defeats count Borrell II of Barcelona.
986	Byzantine–Bulgarian Wars	Battle of the Gates of Trajan	(Bulgaria)	17 Aug	Bulgarians under Samuil of Bulgaria decisively defeat Byzantines under Basil II.
988	Chola Expansions under Rajaraja	Battle of Kandalur Salai	(India)		Cholas defeat members of the Kandalur Salai in Southern India.
991	Viking invasions of England	Battle of Maldon	(England)	10 Aug	Olaf Tryggvason's Vikings defeat English of Ealdorman Brihtnoth of Essex.
991	Karakhanid-Samanid wars	Siege of Sayram	(Kazakhstan)		Kara-Khanid Khanate defeats the Samanids led by their King Nuh II in battle and takes the Samanid city of Sayram.
992	Franco-Breton wars	Battle of Conquereuil	(France)	27 June	Fulk III, Count of Anjou, supported by Nantes and the County of Poitiers, defeats Duke Conan I of Brittany, supported by the Duchy of Normandy and the County of Blois.
992		Battle of Rattapadi	(India)		Chola Empire led by Rajaraja I defeat the Western Chalukyas, capturing Chitradurga.
992	Karakhanid-Samanid wars	Siege of Bukhara	(Uzbekistan)	Late Spring	Kara-Khanids capture Samanid capital but are unable to keep it long.
994	Arab–Byzantine wars	Battle of the Orontes	(Syria)	15 Sep	Fatimid victory over the Byzantines under Michael Bourtzes.
996	Arab–Byzantine wars	Siege of Tyre	(Lebanon)	996—May 998	Fatimid Caliphate defeats the city's rebels and the Byzantine army supporting them.
997	Byzantine–Bulgarian Wars	Battle of Spercheios	(Greece)	16 July	Byzantines defeat Bulgarian attack.
997	Western Chalukya expansion	Battle of Puri	(India)		Western Chalukyas led by crown Prince Satyashraya defeat and annex the Shilaharas.
998	Campaigns of Mahmud of Ghazni	Battle of Ghazni	(Afghanistan)	March	Mahmud of Ghazni defeats and captures his younger brother Ismail of Ghazni and becomes ruler of the Ghaznavids.
998	Arab–Byzantine Wars	Battle of Apamea	(Syria)	19 July	Fatimids defeat Byzantine army under Damian Dalassenos.
998		Battle of Tsumb	(Turkey)		Military commander Vahram Pahlavouni of Armenia, the Kingdom of Vanand and the Kingdom of the Iberians defeat ruler Abu'l-Hayja Mamlan I of the Rawwadid dynasty of Azerbaijan.
998	Croatian–Bulgarian wars	Siege of Zadar	(Croatia)		Bulgarian emperor Samuil unsuccessfully besieged the fortified city of Zadar during the military campaign against Croatia.
999	Ghaznavid-Samanid war	Battle of Merv	(Turkmenistan)	May	Ghaznavids led by Mahmud of Ghazni defeat Samanid Empire.
999	Viking wars in Ireland	Battle of Glenn Mama	(Republic of Ireland)	30 Dec	Brian Boru and Máel Sechnaill defeat the Leinstermen and Vikings of Dublin.
1000	Reconquista	Battle of Cervera	(Spain)		Chancellor Almanzor of the Umayyad state of Córdoba defeats count Sancho García of Castile and Álava and the Kingdom of León under count García Gómez.
1000	Dano-Norwegian Conflicts	Battle of Swold	At sea	9 Sep	Semi-legendary battle. Norway is defeated by an alliance of the other Scandinavians.
1000	Croatian-Venetian wars	Battle of Lastovo	(Croatia)		Forces of the Republic of Venice occupied the island of Lastovo in southern Croatia.

== 11th century ==
Year	War	Battle	Loc.	Date(s)	Description
1001	Ghaznavid campaigns in India	Battle of Peshawar	(Pakistan)	27 Nov	Ghaznavids decisively defeat the Hindu Shahi and capture their ruler Jayapala, who commits suicide in shame.
1002	Reconquista	Battle of Calatañazor	(Spain)	July	Battle where the Christian kings of Spain defeated Saracens under Almanzor, who is said to have died of wounds received in this battle.
1003	Reconquista	Battle of Torà	(Spain)		Count Ramon Borrell of Barcelona, count Ermengol I of Urgell, Bernard I, Count of Besalú and Wifred II, Count of Cerdanya defeat chancellor Abd al-Malik al-Muzaffar of the Umayyad state of Córdoba.
1004	Byzantine–Bulgarian wars	Battle of Skopje	(North Macedonia)		Byzantines under Basil II defeat Bulgarians under Samuel of Bulgaria.
1007	Chalukya-Chola wars	Siege of Unkal	(India)		Chola Empire defeats Western Chalukyas.
1007	Chalukya-Chola wars	Battle of Donur	(India)		Chola Empire defeats Western Chalukyas.
1007	Ghaznavid campaigns in India	Battle of Chach	(Pakistan)	Spring	Ghaznavids again decisively defeat the Hindu Shahi.
1008		Battle at Herdaler	(Finland)		Finns defeat and almost kill Norse King Olaf II of Norway.
1008	Chalukya-Chola Wars	Battle of Rattapadi	(India)		Western Chalukyas regain Chitradurga from the Cholas.
1008	Chalukya-Chola Wars	Battle of Tavareyaghatta	(India)		Western Chalukya Empire decisively defeats the Chola Empire, driving them out of their domains.
1008	Chalukya-Chola Wars	Battle of Chebrolu	(India)		Western Chalukyas defeat Cholas, driving them out of Vengi.
1008		Battle of Sharkhiyan	(Afghanistan)		Ghaznavids] defeat the Kara-Khanids near Balkh.
1008	Chalukya-Chola wars	Reconquest of Vengi	(India)		Rajaraja chola sent Prince Rajendra to counter Invasion Chalukya country and compelled chalukya army withdrew Vengi.
1010	Fitna of al-Andalus	Battle of Aqbat al-Bakr	(Spain)	2 June	Rebels defeat forces of the Caliphate of Córdoba.
1010		Battle of Kwakju	(North Korea)	Dec	Liao dynasty defeats Goryeo.
1011		First Battle of Tongju	(North Korea)	Jan	Goryeo led by Kang Cho repels first attack by Liao dynasty.
1011		Second Battle of Tongju	(North Korea)	7 Jan	Liao dynasty led by Emperor Shengzong of Liao decisively defeat Goryeo and execute Kang Cho.
1014	Viking invasions of Ireland	Battle of Clontarf	(Republic of Ireland)	23 April	Irish King Brian Boru ends Norse rule of Ireland, but is killed in battle.
1014	Byzantine–Bulgarian Wars	Battle of Kleidion	(Bulgaria)	29 July	Byzantine Emperor Basil II conquers the Bulgarians, ending Bulgarian independence for 171 years.
1015	German–Polish War	Battle of Dadosesani Land	(Poland)	1 Sep	Polish victory.
1015	Hammadid–Zirid War	Battle of Chelif River	(Algeria)	17 October	Zirids decisively defeat Hammadids.
1015	Ghaznavid campaigns in India	Siege of Lohkot	(India)		Lohara dynasty in Kashmir repels the Ghaznavids.
1016		Battle of Nesjar	(Norway)	15 March	Future Norwegian king Saint Olav Haraldsson laid foundation for his reign in this victory.
1016	Hammadid–Zirid War	Battle of Achir	(Algeria)	June	Hammadids decisively defeat Zirids.
1016		Battle of Pontlevoy	(France)	6 July	Fulk III, Count of Anjou and Herbert I, Count of Maine defeat Odo II, Count of Blois.
1016	Cnut's invasion of England	Battle of Assandun	(England)	18 Oct	Danes led by Canute the Great defeat an English army led by King Edmund II ('Ironside').
1017		Siege of Anuradhapura	(Sri Lanka)		Chola Empire led by Rajendra Chola I razes and sacks Anuradhapura, ending the Anuradhapura Kingdom and annexing Sri Lanka to the Chola.
1018	Norman conquest of southern Italy	Battle of Cannae	(Italy)		Byzantine forces defeat a Lombard revolt
1018		Battle of Carham	(England)		Máel Coluim II, King of Scots, defeats the Northumbrians.
1018		Siege of Granada	(Spain)		Taifa of Granada defeats Umayyad pretender Abd al-Rahman IV.
1018	Kievan succession crisis of 1015–1019	Battle of the River Bug	(Poland) / (Ukraine)	22–23 July	Poland defeats Kievan Rus.
1018		Battle of Vlaardingen	(Netherlands)	29 July	Count Dirk III of West Frisia defeats an army sent by Henry II, Holy Roman Emperor at Vlaardingen.
1018	Third Goryeo–Khitan War	Battle of Heunghwajin	(North Korea)	10—1019	Koreans defeat the Khitan.
1019	Third Goryeo–Khitan War	Battle of Kuju	(North Korea)	10 March	The major battle during the Third Goryeo-Khitan War, decisive victory for the Goryeo.
1019	Instability during Al Hakim's reign	The Day of al-Kāʾina	(Egypt)	May or June	Turkish soldiers in Fatimid army besieged the Druze, after a short battle the Druze fled to the palace where Al-Hakim executed al-Darazi, soldier discipline collapsed and much of Cairo burned .
1019	Chalukya–Chola wars	Battle of Maski	(India)	1019—1020	Rajendra Chola I defeats Jayasimha II of the Western Chalukyas.
1021	Byzantine–Georgian wars	Battle of Shirimni	(Turkey)	11 Sep	Byzantine forces under Basil II defeats Georgian forces under George I.
1021		Siege of Gwalior	(India)		Between Ghaznavid Empire and Kachchhapaghata dynasty.
1022	Byzantine–Georgian wars	Battle of Svindax	(Turkey)	Spring	Byzantine Emperor Basil II defeats Giorgi I of Georgia, forcing him to accept a treaty.
1024	Rus'-Byzantine wars	Battle of Lemnos	(Greece)		Byzantine forces annihilate a Rus' raid.
1024	Post-Kievan succession crisis of 1015–1019	Battle of Listven	(Ukraine)		Mstislav of Chernigov defeats Yaroslav the Wise, stalemate over sole rulership of Kiev.
1025	South-East Asia campaign of Rajendra I	Raid of Palembang	(Indonesia)		Rajendra Chola of the Chola Empire defeats and sacks the capital of Srivijaya.
1025	South-East Asia campaign of Rajendra I	Battle of Kedah	(Malaysia)		Rajendra Chola defeats Srivijaya.
1026	Ghaznavid campaign in India	Sack of Somnath	(India)	8 January	Ghaznavids defeat Chaulukya dynasty.
1027	Ghaznavid campaign in India	Battle of the Indus	(Pakistan)	March	Ghaznavids led by Mahmud of Ghazni defeat the Jats.
1028	Chola-Chalukya wars	Battle of the Godavari River	(India)		Western Chalukyas decisively defeat an Indian Coalition of the Cholas, Paramaras, and Kalachuris.
1030		Battle of Stiklestad	(Norway)	29 July	Norwegian King Saint Olaf Haraldsson is killed in battle, but Christianization of Norway is ensured.
1030	Arab–Byzantine Wars	Battle of Azaz	(Syria)	8–10 Aug	Mirdasids defeat a large Byzantine army led by Emperor Romanos III in person.
1032		Battle of Dabusiyya	(Uzbekistan)	April	Stalemate between Ghaznavid Empire and Kara-Khanid Khanate. Ghaznavid commander Altun Tash mortally wounded.
1032		Battle of Derbent	(Dagestan)		Lekia and Emirates of Derbent are attacked by Alans and Sarir.
1035	Chalukya-Chola wars	Battle of Vengi	(India)		Rajathiraja chola defeated Western chalukyas and captured Vengi .
1035	Reconquista	Battle of Tafalla	(Spain)		García Sánchez III of Pamplona defeats his brother Ramiro I of Aragon.
1037	Reconquista	Battle of Tamarón	(Spain)	4 Sep	Ferdinand, Count of Castile defeats and kills his brother-in-law Vermudo III King of León.
1037		Battle of Bar-le-Duc	(France)	15 Nov	A Holy Roman Imperial army under Gothelo I, Duke of Lorraine defeats Odo II, Count of Blois, contender to the Kingdom of Arles. Odo II is killed.
1038	Seljuk-Ghaznavid Wars	Battle of Sarakhs	(Turkmenistan) (Iran)	May	Seljuks again defeat Ghaznavids.
1040	Seljuk-Ghaznavid Wars	Battle of Dandanaqan	(Turkmenistan)	23 May	Seljuk Turks defeat the Ghaznavid Empire and begin occupying Khorasan.
1040		Battle at Brůdek	(Czech Republic)	22/23 Aug	Duke Bretislav I of Bohemia defeats king Henry III of Germany.
1040		Siege of Zaranj	(Afghanistan)		Ghaznavids defeat Seljuks.
1041	Norman conquest of southern Italy	Battle of Olivento	(Italy)	17 March	Normans and Lombards defeat Byzantines.
1041	Norman conquest of southern Italy	Battle of Montemaggiore	(Italy)	4 May	Lombards and Normans defeat Byzantines in Italy, whose remaining forces retreated to Bari.
1041		Battle of Ostrovo	(Greece)		Emperor Michael IV the Paphlagonian of the Byzantine Empire defeats Bulgarian rebels under Petar Delyan.
1042	Byzantine–Serbian wars	Battle of Bar	(Montenegro)	7 Oct	Duklja victory over Byzantines, resulting by future of Duklja without Byzantine imperial authority. 7 October is commemorated as the day of Military of Montenegro.
1042	Georgian civil war	Battle of Sasireti	(Georgia (country))		Byzantine Empire intervenes in a civil war in Georgia in favor of the rebels. Royal army of Georgia crushed.
1042	Song-Xia wars	Battle of Dingchuan Village	(China)		Western Xia defeat the Song dynasty.
1044	German-Hungarian War	Battle of Ménfő	(Hungary)	5 June	Germans and Hungarian supporters of the deposed King Peter Orseolo defeat Hungarians under King Samuel Aba who was captured and killed.
1044		Battle of Nouy	(France)	22 Aug	Geoffrey II, Count of Anjou defeats Theobald III, Count of Blois and count Stephen II of Troyes.
1046	Byzantine–Seljuq wars and Georgian–Seljuk wars	Battle of Ganja	(Azerbaijan)		Seljuks defeat Byzantines in their first military encounter.
1046	Chalukya-Chola wars	Battle of Dannada	(India)		Cholas under Emperor Rajadhiraja I defeat the Western Chalukyas on the Krishna River and burn down their fort.
1046	Chalukya-Chola wars	Battle of Pundur	(India)		Rajathiraja Chola defeated Western Chalukyas
1046	Byzantine–Seljuk wars	Battle of Ganja	(Azerbaijan)		Seljuks defeat Byzantine Empire.
1047		Battle of Val-ès-Dunes	(France)	Early summer	Victory of William, Duke of Normandy and King Henry I of France against the forces of several rebel Norman barons.
1047	Miecław's Rebellion	Battle of 1047 between Casimir I and Miecław	(Poland)		Duke Casimir I the Restorer of Poland and grand prince Yaroslav the Wise of Kievan Rus' defeat Miecław.
1048	Byzantine–Seljuq wars and Georgian–Seljuk wars	Battle of Kapetron	(Turkey)	18 Sep	Byzantines and Georgians defeat Seljuk Turkish army; however, the Turkish central flank captured Liparit IV of Kldekari and received a large ransom for him after escaping back to Seljuk territory.
c. 1050	1025–1026 Tambralinga/Srivijiya–Ankorian/Chola Wars	Siege of Angkor	(Cambodia)		Tambralinga King Sujita unsuccessfully attacks the capital of the Khmer Empire.
1051	Seljuk-Ghaznavid Wars	Battle of Hupyan	(Afghanistan)		Ghaznavids under Toghrul of Ghazna defeat Seljuks under Alp Arslan.
1051		Battle of Vértes	(Hungary)		It was a conflict that broke out, when the Emperor Henry III tried to invade Hungary and was defeated by King Andrew I of Hungary and Duke Béla of Hungary.
1052	Hilalian invasion of Ifriqiya	Battle of Haydaran	(Tunisia)	14 April	Decisive Banu Hilal victory
1052	Chalukya-Chola wars	Battle of Koppam	(India)	28 May	Chola Empire defeats Western Chalukyas in battle but their king Rajadhiraja Chola is slain in battle.
1053		Battle of Civitate	(Italy)	18 June	Robert Guiscard's Normans destroy the army of Pope Leo IX.
1053	Arab–Byzantine wars	Siege of Medina	(Malta)	1053 or 1054	Failed Byzantine attempt to retake Medina, Malta.
1054		Battle of Dunsinane	(Scotland)	27 July	Malcolm defeats MacBeth.
1054		Battle of Atapuerca	(Spain)	1 Sep	King Ferdinand I of Leon and Castile decisively defeats and kills King García Sánchez III of Pamplona. Leon reannexes all of Navarre's territories south of the Ebro river.
1054	Byzantine–Seljuq wars	Siege of Manzikert	(Turkey)		Byzantines successfully defend from Seljuk Turks.
1054		Battle of Mortemer	(France)		The Duchy of Normandy under Robert, Count of Eu defeats France under Odo of France.
1055	Battles of the Almoravids	Capture of Aoudaghost	(Mauritania)		Almoravids capture West African town of Aoudaghost.
1056	Battles of the Almoravids	Battle of Tabfarilla	(Mauritania)	21 March – 19 April	Berber Godala tribe defeats Berber Lamtuna tribe allied with Takrur state in present-day Mauritania.
1057		Battle of Lumphanan	(Scotland)	15 Aug	MacBeth is killed in battle against Malcolm's forces.
1057		Battle of Petroe	(Turkey)	20 Aug	Isaac I Komnenos defeats emperor Michael VI Bringas of the Byzantine Empire.
1057		Battle of Varaville	(France)	Aug	Normans under William, Duke of Normandy defeats French King Henry I of France and Count Geoffrey Martel of Anjou.
1057		Battle of Sinjar	(Iraq)		al-Basasiri leading the forces of the Buyids and Fatimids defeat the Seljuks.
1060	Hungarian civil war	Battle of the Theben Pass	(Hungary)	Autumn	Béla I of Hungary with a Hungarian and Polish army defeats king Andrew I of Hungary with a Hungarian and German army. Andrew dies of his battle wounds and Béla becomes king.
1062	Chalukya-Chola Wars	Battle of Kudal-Sangamam	(India)		Chola defeat Western Chalukyas.
1062	Zenkunen War	Siege of Kuriyagawa	(Japan)		Forces of Minamoto no Yoshiie defeat forces of Abe no Sadato
1062	Dambadeniya–Tambralinga wars		(Sri Lanka)		Kingdom of Dambadeniya and Pandya Kingdom defeat Tambralinga and kill their king Chandrabhanu in battle.
1063	Norman conquest of southern Italy	Battle of Cerami	(Italy)	June	Normans under Roger I of Sicily defeated a Muslim alliance of Sicilian and Zirid dynasty troops.
1063	Reconquista	Battle of Graus	(Spain)		Castile and Zaragoza defeat Aragon, killing Ramiro I.
1063		Battle of La Castelle	(France)		William VIII, Duke of Aquitaine and Gascony defeats rebel Gascon forces under Bernard II Tumapaler.
1063	Seljuk War of Succession of 1063	Battle of Damghan	(Iran)		Alp Arslan defeat and kills his political rival for the Seljuk throne Qutalmish.
1064	Byzantine–Seljuk wars	Siege of Ani	(Turkey)	July—Aug	Seljuks under Alp Arslan capture city from the Byzantines.
1064	Georgian–Seljuk wars	Siege of Akhalkalaki	(Azerbaijan)		Seljuks under Alp Arslan decisively defeat Georgians under Bagrat IV of Georgia.
1065	Reconquista	Battle of Paterna	(Spain)		Kingdom of León defeats Taifa of Valencia.
1066	Viking invasions of England	Battle of Fulford	(England)	20 Sep	Norwegian Vikings led by Harald III of Norway defeat the northern earls Edwin and Morcar.
1066	Viking invasions of England	Battle of Stamford Bridge	(England)	25 Sep	Harold Godwinson of England defeats his brother Tostig Godwinson and Harald III of Norway, both are killed.
1066	Norman Conquest	Battle of Hastings	(England)	14 Oct	Normans under William the Conqueror defeat the Anglo-Saxon army under Harold Godwinson, who is killed.
1067		Battle on the Nemiga River	(Belarus)	3 March	Principalities of Kiev, Chernigov, and Pereiaslavl defeat Principality of Polotsk.
1068	Reconquista	Battle of Llantada	(Spain)	19 July	Sancho II of Castile with the aid of El Cid defeats his brother Alfonso VI of León.
1068	Byzantine–Norman wars and Norman conquest of southern Italy	Siege of Bari	(Italy)	5 August 1068—15 April 1071	Byzantines lose Bari, their last possession in Italy, to the Norman Robert Guiscard.
1068	Chalukya–Chola wars	Battle of Vijayawada	(India)		Chola Empire defeat Western Chalukyas and recover Vengi.
1068	Chalukya–Chola wars	Battle of Kampili	(India)		Vira rajendra chola defeated Someshvara ll.
1068	Kievan succession crisis of 1015–1019	Battle of the Alta River	(Ukraine)		Cumans defeat Kievan Rus'.
1068	Norman conquest of southern Italy	Battle of Misilmeri	(Italy)		Normans under Roger I of Sicily defeat larger Muslim Berber and Arab army in their conquest of Sicily.
1068		Battle of Kerlés / Cserhalom	(Romania)		Hungarians defeat a raiding Pecheneg army in Transylvania
1069	Norman Conquest	Battle of Northam	(England)		Normans defeat Saxons led by the sons of the late Harold Godwinson trying to retake England.
1069	Byzantine-Seljuk wars	Battle of Iconium	(Turkey)		Byzantines defeat Seljuks.
1070	Chahamana-Chaulukya Wars	Battle of Sanderao	(India)		Chahamanas under Jendraraja defeat Chaulukyas under Bhima I
1071		Battle of Pedroso	(Portugal)	18 Februari	King García II of Galicia defeats rebel count Nuno Mendes of Portugal
1071		Battle of Cassel	(France)	22 Feb	Robert the Frisian defeats and kills Arnulf III, Count of Flanders, claiming the title of Count of Flanders.
1071	Byzantine–Seljuk wars	Battle of Manzikert	(Turkey)	26 Aug	Byzantine Emperor Romanos IV Diogenes is defeated and captured by the Seljuk Turks.
1071	Mustansirite Hardship	Siege of Cairo	(Egypt)		Nasir al-Dawla Ibn Hamdan leader of the Turkish mercenaries recaptures Cairo from Nubian mercenaries .
1072		Battle of Golpejera	(Spain)	11 January	King Sancho II of Castile defeats king Alfonso VI of León.
1072	Norman conquest of Southern Italy	Siege of Palermo	(Italy)	August 1071-10 January 1072	Normans led by Robert Guiscard and his brother Roger I of Sicily defeat Muslim alliance of the Kalbids and Zirids, marking the end of Muslim rule in western Sicily
1073		Battle of Kerj Abu Dulaf	(Iran)		Sultan Malik-Shah I of the Seljuk Empire defeats shah Qavurt of the Kerman Seljuk Sultanate.
1074		Battle of Kemej	(Hungary)	26 February	Solomon, King of Hungary ambushes and defeats his cousin Dukes Géza.
1074		Battle of Mogyoród	(Hungary)	14 March	Pretender Géza I of Hungary defeats king Solomon of Hungary in battle and becomes the new king of Hungary.
1075	Saxon revolt of 1073–1075	Battle of Langensalza	(Germany)	9 June	King Henry IV of Germany defeated rebel Saxons decisively.
1075	Georgian–Seljuk wars	Battle of Partskhisi	(Georgia (country))	Aug/Sep	Kingdom of Georgia decisively defeats Seljuk Empire.
1075	Song–Đại Việt war	Siege of Yongzhou	(China)		Đại Việt raze Song city.
1076		Battle of IJsselmeer	(Netherlands)		Count Dirk V of West Frisia defeats the army of bishop Conrad of Utrecht, thereby reconquering his county.
1077	Song–Đại Việt war	Battle of Nhu Nguyet River	(Vietnam)		Đại Việt beats back army of the Song dynasty, forcing them to retreat.
1078	Saxon revolt of 1077–1088	Battle of Mellrichstadt	(Germany)	7 Aug	King Henry IV of Germany is defeated by anti-king Rudolf of Swabia.
1078		Battle of Kalavrye	(Turkey)		Imperial forces under Alexios Komnenos defeat the rebels under Nikephoros Bryennios the Elder.
1078	Norman conquest of southern Italy	Siege of Taormina	(Italy)		The Italo-Normans capture the fortress of Taormina from the Emirate of Sicily.
1079	Reconquista	Battle of Cabra	(Spain)		El Cid defeats the combined forces of the Emir of Granada and his Castilian allies.
1080	Saxon revolt of 1077–1088	Battle of Flarchheim	(Germany)	27 Jan	Inconclusive battle between Henry IV, Holy Roman Emperor and Rudolf of Swabia.
1080	Saxon revolt of 1077–1088	Battle on the Elster	(Germany)	14 Oct	German anti-king Rudolf of Swabia defeats German king Henry IV, Holy Roman Emperor militarily, however Henry defeats Rudolf politically.
1080	Investiture Controversy	Battle of Volta Mantovana	(Italy)	15 Oct	Pro-imperial bishops defeat an army of pro-papal forces.
1081	First Norman invasion of the Balkans	Battle of Dyrrhachium	(Albania)	18 Oct	Robert Guiscard of Apulia and Calabria defeats the Byzantines under Emperor Alexios I Komnenos.
1082		Battle of Mailberg	(Austria)	12 May	Duke Vratislaus II of Bohemia defeats Leopold II, Margrave of Austria
1082	Reconquista	Battle of Almenar	(Spain)	Spring or summer	The Muslim Taifa of Zaragoza under the Christian mercenary commander El Cid defeats the Muslim ruler Mundhir al-Hajib of the Taifa of Lérida and the Christian count Berenguer Ramon II of Barcelona.
1083	First Norman invasion of the Balkans	Battle of Larissa	(Greece)	July	Byzantines decisively repel Norman siege of the County of Apulia and Calabria.
1084	Investiture Controversy	Sack of Rome	(Italy)	May	Henry IV, Holy Roman Emperor besieges Rome against Pope Gregory VII, the Normans successfully rescue the Pope but then they sack the city.
1084	Investiture Controversy	Battle of Sorbara	(Italy)	2 July	An Imperial army is defeated by a pro-papal army.
1084	Reconquista	Battle of Morella	(Spain)	14 Aug	Zaragoza under El Cid and Yusuf al-Mu'tamin defeat Sancho Ramírez, king of Aragon and Navarre
1085	Byzantine-Seljuk wars	Siege of Antioch	(Turkey)	December 1084 – 12 January 1085	Seljuks capture Antioch from the Byzantines.
1085	Battle of Kurzahil	(Syria)	20 Jun	Sultan Suleiman ibn Qutalmish of the Sultanate of Rum, for the Seljuk Empire, defeats emir Muslim ibn Quraysh of the Uqaylid dynasty.	
1085	Reconquista	Siege of Toledo	(Spain)		Alfonso VI of Castile captures and annexes Toledo, defeating the Taifa of Toledo.
1086	Saxon revolt of 1077–1088	Battle of Pleichfeld	(Germany)	11 Aug	Henry IV, Holy Roman Emperor is defeated by rebel forces of anti-king Herman of Luxembourg and Welf of Bavaria.
1086	Reconquista	Battle of Sagrajas	(Spain)	23 Oct	Almoravids defeat Castile and Aragon forces decisively.
1086		Battle of Ain Salm	(Syria)	5 June	Seljuks under Tutush defeat Sultanate of Rum under Suleiman ibn Qutalmish, who's killed in the battle.
1087	Byzantine–Pecheneg wars	Battle of Dristra	(Bulgaria)	Aug	Pechenegs defeat Byzantines.
1087	Crusades	Siege of Mahdia	(Tunisia)	Aug	The Republics of Genoa and Pisa, with the support of Amalfi and the Pope, besiege and temporarily occupy the Zirid coastal town of Mahdia.
1090		Battle of the Oinousses Islands	(Greece)	19 May	A fleet of bey Chaka Bey of İzmir defeats the Byzantine Empire under Niketas Kastamonites.
1091	Komnenian restoration	Battle of Levounion	(Turkey)	29 April	Byzantines under Alexios I Komnenos defeat the Pechenegs.
1093		Battle of the Stugna River	(Ukraine)	26 May	The Kipchaks defeat Chernihiv and Kiev.
1093		Battle of Alnwick	(England)	13 Nov	Malcolm III of Scotland is killed by English Knights under Robert de Mowbray.
1093	Christianisation of the Germanic peoples	Battle of Schmilau	(Germany)		A Christian coalition of Christian Obotrites under Henry, the Duchy of Saxony under Duke Magnus and Denmark defeat Obotrite followers of the Slavic Obotrite religion.
1093/1094	Norman conquest	Battle of Brecon	(England)	Between 17 and 23 April	Bernard de Neufmarché and his Norman knights defeat King Rhys Ap Tewdr and Bleddyn Ap Maenyrch near Brecon.
1094	Reconquista	Battle of Cuarte	(Spain)	21 October	El Cid defeats the Almoravid dynasty.
1094	Reconquista	Siege of Huesca	(Spain)		Sancho Ramírez killed by arrows while trying to take city.
1095		Battle of Rey	(Iran)		Berkyaruq defeats and kills Tutush I, the rebelling Emir of Damascus and previous Sultan's brother.
1096	People's Crusade	Battle of Civetot	(Turkey)	21 Oct	Seljuk Turks, led by Kilij Arslan I, defeat the People's Crusade.
1096	Reconquista	Battle of Alcoraz	(Spain)		King Peter I of Aragon successfully conquers Huesca for the Christians, from king Al-Musta'in II of Zaragoza.
1096		Battle of Gopło	(Poland)		Civil war in Poland. Sieciech defeats Zbigniew
1097	Reconquista	Battle of Bairén	(Spain)	Jan	El Cid and Peter I of Aragon lead the Kingdom of Aragon and Kingdom of Valencia to victory against the Almoravid dynasty
1097	War of the Croatian Succession	Battle of Gvozd Mountain	(Croatia)	April/May	Hungarian forces under King Coloman defeat the Croats, killing their king Petar Snačić.
1097	First Crusade and Byzantine–Seljuk wars	Siege of Nicaea	(Turkey)	14 May – 19 June	Byzantines and Crusaders defeat forces of the Sultanate of Rum at Nicaea.
1097	First Crusade	Battle of Dorylaeum	(Turkey)	1 July	Crusaders defeat the Seljuk forces in Anatolia.
1097	First Crusade	Siege of Antioch	(Turkey)	20 October 1097—28 June 1098	Crusaders capture Antioch after more than eight months of siege.
1097	Reconquista	Battle of Consuegra	(Spain)		Almoravid dynasty defeats Castile and León. Diego Rodríguez, the son of El Cid killed.
1097		Siege of Kalinga	(India)		Chola defeat Eastern Gangas, making Kalinga into their tributary.
1098	First Crusade	Battle of the Lake of Antioch	(Turkey)	9 Feb	Crusader army of 700 knights defeat numerically superior Seljuq relief force.
1098	First Crusade	Siege of Ma'arra	(Syria)	Nov—Dec	Crusaders capture Ma'arra.
1099		Battle of the Wiar River	(Poland) or (Ukraine)	Spring	Prince David Igorevich and chieftain Boniak of the Cumans defeat Coloman, King of Hungary.
1099	First Crusade	Siege of Jerusalem	(Israel)	7 June – 15 July	Crusaders capture Jerusalem from the Fatimids after a month of siege and bloody street-fighting.
1099	First Crusade	Battle of Ascalon	(Israel)	12 Aug	Crusaders defeat the Fatimids at Ascalon, but the city is not taken.
1100	Crusades	Battle of Melitene	(Turkey)		Melik Gazi Gümüshtigin of the Danishmendids defeats prince Bohemond I of Antioch.

== 12th century ==
Year	War	Battle	Loc.	Date(s)	Description
1101	Crusades	Battle of Heraclea	(Turkey)	Summer	Seljuks defeat Crusaders.
1101	Crusades	Battle of Mersivan	(Turkey)	Aug	Seljuk Turks defeat Crusaders.
1101	Crusades	Battle of Ramla	(Israel)	7 Sep	Jerusalem forces under Baldwin I defeat a superior Fatimid army.
1102	Crusades	Battle of Ramla	(Israel)	17 May	A Fatimid army defeats 500 Crusader knights.
1104	Crusades	Battle of Harran	(Turkey)	7 May	Baldwin II of Jerusalem is captured by the Seljuk Turks.
1104	Georgian–Seljuk wars	Battle of Ertsukhi	(Georgia (country))		King David IV of the Kingdom of Georgia decisively defeats the Seljuk Empire.
1105	Crusades	Battle of Artah	(Syria)	20 April	Crusaders of Antioch defeat the Seljuk Turks of Aleppo.
1105	Crusades	Battle of Ramla	(Israel)	27 Aug	Crusaders under Baldwin I defeat the Fatimids.
1106	Henry I's invasion of Normandy	Battle of Tinchebray	(France)	28 Sep	Henry I of England defeats his brother Robert, Duke of Normandy, in northwestern France.
1107	Rus'–Cuman wars	Battle of the Sula river	(Ukraine)	12 Aug	Grand Prince Sviatopolk II of Kievan Rus' defeats chieftain Boniak of the Cumans.
1107	Nizari–Seljuk conflicts	Siege of Shahdiz	(Iran)		Seljuks under Sultan Muhammad I Tapar siege and capture the Nizari fortress and massacre most of the remaining defenders.
1107		Battle of Khabur River	(Iraq)		Muhammad I Tapar defeats and kills his brother Kilij Arslan I.
1108	Reconquista	Battle of Uclés	(Spain)	29 May	Almoravids' victory over Castile and León; Sancho, son and heir of Alfonso VI of León and Castile, is slain.
1108	Crusades	Battle of Turbessel	(Turkey)	Sep	Tancred, regent of the Principality of Antioch and forces of the Seljuk Sultanate of Aleppo defeat count Baldwin II of the County of Edessa, Joscelin of Courtney, lord of Turbessel and Jawali Saqawa.
1109		Battle of Naklo	(Poland)	10 Aug	Boleslaus III of Poland defeats the Pomeranians.
1109		Battle of Hundsfeld	(Poland)	24 Aug	Boleslaus III of Poland defeats King Henry V of the Holy Roman Empire.
1109		Battle of Głogów	(Poland)	24 Aug	Boleslaus III successfully holds the town of Głogów against Henry V and Svatopluk of Bohemia.
1109	Norwegian Crusade	Battle of Formentera	(Spain)		King Sigurd the Crusader of Norway defeats Saracen pirates.
1109	Norwegian Crusade	Battle of Ibiza	(Spain)		King Sigurd the Crusader of Norway defeats Saracen pirates.
1109	Georgian–Seljuk wars	Battle of Trialeti	(Georgia (country))		Georgians defeat the Seljuks.
1110	Reconquista	Battle of Valtierra	(Spain)	11 January	Emperor Alfonso the Battler of Spain defeats emir Al-Musta'in II of Zaragoza.
1110		Battle of Candespina	(Spain)	26 October	King Alfonso the Battler of Aragon and Navarre and Henry, Count of Portugal defeat queen Urraca of León and Castile.
1110		Siege of Kalinga	(India)		Chola Empire again defeats Eastern Ganga dynasty, annexing Kalinga.
1111	Crusades	Battle of Shaizar	(Syria)	13–29 Sep	Baldwin I of Jerusalem and Mawdud ibn Altuntash fight, resulting in a tactical draw, and withdrawal of the Crusaders.
1111	Crusades	Siege of Tyre	(Lebanon)	21 November 1111—10 April 1112	Baldwin I of Jerusalem leads a Crusader siege of Fatimid city of Tyre, but eventually withdraws.
1113	Crusades	Battle of Al-Sannabra	(Israel)	28 June	Baldwin I of Jerusalem is defeated by Mawdud ibn Altuntash of Mosul.
1114	Reconquista	Battle of Martorell	(Spain)		Ramon Berenguer III, Count of Barcelona, count Ermengol IV of Urgell and Bernard, Count of Cerdanya defeat governor Muhammad ibn al-Hajj and general Muhammad ibn Aisha of the Almoravid dynasty.
1115		Battle of Welfesholz	(Germany)	11 Feb	Saxons under Lothair I of Supplinburg defeat the Holy Roman army.
1115	Crusades	Battle of Sarmin	(Syria)	14 Sep	Crusaders from Antioch led by Roger of Salerno defeat the Seljuk Turks.
1116		Battle of Olšava	(Czech Republic)	13 May	Vladislaus I, Duke of Bohemia defeats king Stephen II of Hungary.
1116	Byzantine–Seljuk wars	Battle of Philomelion	(Turkey)	Autumn	Byzantines defeat Seljuk Turks.
1116		Battle of Talakad	(India)		Hoysalas decisively defeat Cholas.
1117		Battle of Ghazni	(Afghanistan)		Seljuks defeat Ghaznavids.
1118		Battle of Kannegala	(India)		Vishnuvardhana of the Hoysalas defeats the Western Chalukyas.
1119	Crusades	Battle of Ager Sanguinis	(Syria)	28 June	Turks under Ilghazi defeat Antioch troops, killing Roger of Salerno.
1119		Battle of Brémule	(France)	20 Aug	England defeats France in Normandy, repelling a French invasion.
1119		Battle of Saveh	(Iran)		Ahmad Sanjar defeats Mahmud II.
1120	Georgian–Seljuk wars	Battle of Botora	(Turkey)	14 Feb	Georgian forces under David IV attack and defeat Seljuk Turks camped at Botora.
1120	Reconquista	Battle of Cutanda	(Spain)	June	King Alfonso the Battler of Aragon and William IX, Duke of Aquitaine defeat the Almoravid dynasty under Ibrahim ibn Yusuf.
1121	Georgian–Seljuk wars	Battle of Didgori	(Georgia (country))	12 Aug	Georgian forces under David IV defeat a Muslim coalition under Ilghazi.
1121		Battle of Niekładź	(Poland)		Duke Bolesław III Wrymouth of Poland defeats prince Wartislaw I and Swietopelk of Pomerania.
1122	Georgian–Seljuk wars	Siege of Tbilisi	(Georgia (country))	Feb	Georgians under David IV retake capital and gain independence from the Seljuk Turks.
1122	Byzantine–Pecheneg Wars	Battle of Beroia	(Bulgaria)		Byzantines under John II Komnenos defeat Pechenegs.
1123	Crusades	Battle of Yibneh	(Israel)	29 May	Kingdom of Jerusalem led by Eustace Grenier defeats Fatimid Caliphate led by al-Ma'mun al-Bata'ihi.
1123		Battle of Al-Dimas	(Tunisia)	25 July-9 August	In naval battle, Zirids repel attempted invasion by the Kingdom of Sicily
1124	Henry I's campaigns in Normandy	Battle of Bourgthéroulde	(France)	26 March	A Royal English-Norman army under Odo Borleng defeats rebel Norman forces under Waleran de Beaumont, 1st Earl of Worcester.
1124	Crusades	Siege of Aleppo	(Syria)	6 October 1124—25 Jan 1125	Crusaders under Baldwin II of Jerusalem withdraw attempted siege on Aleppo.
1125	Rus'–Cuman wars	Battle of Polkstin	(Ukraine)	May-Jun	Prince Yaropolk I of the Principality of Pereyaslavl defeats chieftains Syrchan and Otrok of the Cumans.
1125	Crusades	Battle of Azaz	(Syria)	11 June	Crusaders under Baldwin II of Jerusalem defeat Seljuks, Mosul, and Aleppo forces.
1125	Jin–Song wars	Jingkang Incident	(China)	Sep 1125—March 1127	Jin dynasty besiege and annex Bianjing, capital of the Song dynasty, capture Emperor Qinzong and many members of the Song royal family.
1126	Crusades	Battle of Marj al-Saffar	(Syria)	26 Jan	Crusaders under Baldwin II of Jerusalem defeat the Burids of Damascus.
1126	War of Bohemian Succession	Battle of Chlumec	(Czech Republic)	18 Feb	A Bohemian army of duke Soběslav I defeats a German army of king Lothair III. Lothair III tried to install Otto II the Black on the Bohemian throne, who was killed in battle.
1126	Reconquista	Battle of Arnisol	(Spain)	10 Mar	King Alfonso the Battler of Aragon and Navarre defeats the Almoravid dynasty under Ibn Abu Bakr.
1126	Reconquista	Battle of Corbins	(Spain)		Abdulla ibn Iyad of the Almoravid dynasty defeats Ramon Berenguer III, Count of Barcelona and Bernard Raymond, count of Pallars Jussà.
1128	Đại Việt–Khmer War	Battle of Ba Dau	(Vietnam)	Jan—Feb	Viet defeat Khmer.
1128		Battle of Axpoele	(Belgium)	21 June	William Clito defeats Thierry of Alsace in a war for the control of the County of Flanders.
1128		Battle of São Mamede	(Portugal)	24 June	Afonso Henriques defeats his mother Teresa of León and takes control over the County of Portugal.
1128	Byzantine–Hungarian War	Battle of Haram	(Serbia)		Byzantines decisively defeat Hungary.
1130	Battles of the Almoravids	Battle of al-Buhayra	(Morocco)	May	Almoravids defeat Almohads.
1130		Siege of Bayonne	(France)	Oct 1130—Oct 1131	King Alfonso the Battler of Aragon lifts his siege on Duchy of Aquitaine's city of Bayonne.
1130	Jin–Song Wars	Battle of Huangtiandang	(China)		Jin troops trapped for 48 days but eventually defeat Song dynasty.
1132	Norman conquest of southern Italy	Battle of Nocera	(Italy)	24 July	Roger II of Sicily is defeated in his first major engagement by Ranulf II, Count of Alife.
1132	Jin–Song Wars	Siege of De'an	(China)		Song dynasty victory over Jin-supported rebels, first historical use of the fire lance, an early ancestor of firearms.
1132		Siege of Tasghimut	(Morocco)		Almohads take major fortress from the Almoravids.
1133	Chalukya-Chola wars	Battle of Godavari	(India)		Vikrama chola defeated Someshvara lll and captured Vengi.
1134	Reconquista	Battle of Fraga	(Spain)	17 July	Almoravids defeat Aragon.
1134	Danish Civil War	Battle of Fotevik	(Sweden)	4 June	Eric II of Denmark defeats the forces of Niels, King of Denmark and his son Magnus, the latter of whom is killed in battle.
1134		Siege of Balasagun	(Kyrgyzstan)		Kara-Khitai take capital of the Kara-Khanids.
1136	Norman invasion of Wales	Battle of Crug Mawr	(Wales)	10 Oct	Welsh under Owain Gwynedd defeat the South Wales Normans.
1137	Norman conquest of southern Italy	Battle of Rignano	(Italy)	30 Oct	Roger II of Sicily is defeated in a major engagement by Ranulf, Duke of Apulia, again.
1137		Battle of Khujand	(Tajikistan)		Kara-Khitai defeat Western Kara-Khanid Khanate and take central Transoxiana.
1138	The Anarchy	Battle of Clitheroe	(England)	10 June	Scots defeat English.
1138	Reconquista	Siege of Coria	(Spain)	July	Almoravids defeat Alfonso VII of León.
1138	The Anarchy	Battle of the Standard	(England)	22 Aug	English forces under William of Aumale defeat an army of David I of Scotland.
1138	1138 Khwarazmian rebellion against Seljuks	Battle of Hazarasp	(Uzbekistan)		Seljuks under Ahmad Sanjar defeat rebellion by Khwarazmians under Atsiz, who fled.
1139	Reconquista	Siege of Oreja	(Spain)	April—Oct	Alfonso VII conquers Almoravid castle.
1139	Portuguese Reconquista	Battle of Ourique	(Portugal)	25 July	Afonso Henriques defeats the Almoravids and declares Portugal an independent kingdom with himself as monarch.
1140	Welf-Hohenstaufen feud	Siege of Weinsberg	(Germany)	21 Dec	Conrad III of Germany besieges the Welf city of Weinsberg unsuccessfully.
1140	Jin–Song wars	Battle of Yancheng	(China)		Song dynasty decisively defeats Jin dynasty.
1141		Battle of Valdevez	(Portugal)	Summer 1140 or 1141	Portugal defeats Leon.
1141		Battle of Qatwan	(Uzbekistan)	9 Sep	Kara Khitai decisively defeat the Seljuk Empire and their vassal the Kara-Khanids.
1142		Battle of Vysoká	(Czech Republic)	22 April	Rebel nobles defeat duke Vladislaus II of Bohemia.
1142	Reconquista	Siege of Coria	(Spain)	May—June	Leon takes city from Almoravids.
1143	The Anarchy	Battle of Wilton	(England)	1 July	Robert, 1st Earl of Gloucester defeats the forces of Stephen of Blois.
1144	Second Crusade	Siege of Edessa	(Turkey)	28 Nov – 24 Dec	Zengi captures Edessa from the Crusaders.
1144		Battle of Visseiche bridge	(France)		Rebel Breton forces under baron Robert II of Vitré defeats Conan III, Duke of Brittany.
1145	Polish civil war	Battle on the Pilica	(Poland)		The army of Bolesław the Curly and Mieszko defeats the army of high duke Władysław II of Poland, in a Polish civil war.
1146	Reconquista	Battle of Albacete	(Spain)	5 Feb	The Kingdom of León and Castile defeats Zafadola.
1146		Battle of the Fischa	(Austria)	11 Sep	King Géza II of Hungary defeats duke Henry XI of Bavaria.
1146	Crusades	Siege of Edessa	(Turkey)	October - November	Permanent end of the rule of the Frankish Counts of Edessa after Edessa captured by Zengids.
1147	Portuguese Reconquista	Battle of Santarém	(Portugal)	15 March	Portugal captures the city of Santarém from the Almoravids.
1147	Northern Crusades	Siege of Lübeck	(Germany)	24–26 June	During the Wendish Crusade, Lübeck was besieged by the Polabian Slavs.
1147	Portuguese Reconquista and Second Crusade	Siege of Lisbon	(Portugal)	1 July – 25 Oct	Crusaders under Afonso I of Portugal capture Lisbon from the Almoravids.
1147		Siege of Marrakesh	(Morocco)		Almohads capture the Almoravid capital of Marrakesh.
1147	Second Crusade	Battle of Constantinople	(Turkey)	Sep	Byzantines defeat German crusaders and force them to cross to Asia Minor.
1147	Second Crusade	Battle of Dorylaeum	(Turkey)	25 Oct	Seljuk Turks defeat German crusaders under Conrad III.
1147	Second Crusade	Battle of Ephesus	(Turkey)	24 Dec	Frankish Crusaders defeat Seljuk Turks.
1147	Second Crusade	Battle of the Meander	(Turkey)	Dec	Crusaders once again defeat Seljuks.
1148	Second Crusade	Battle of Mount Cadmus	(Turkey)	6 Jan	Sultan Mesud I of Rum slaughters the army of king Louis VII of France.
1148	Reconquista and Second Crusade	Siege of Tortosa	(Spain)	1 July – 30 Dec	Coalition led by Barcelona and Genoa conquer Tortosa from the Almoravids.
1148	Second Crusade	Siege of Damascus	(Syria)	24–28 July	French and German Crusaders, in alliance with Jerusalem, fail to conquer Damascus from the Saracens, ending the Second Crusade.
1148		Battle of Ghazni	(Afghanistan)		Ghurid dynasty defeats Ghaznavids.
1149	Crusades	Battle of Inab	(Syria)	29 June	Raymond of Antioch and the leadership of the Order of Assassins killed in battle against Nur ad-Din Zangi and Unur of Damascus.
1150	Welf-Hohenstaufen feud	Battle of Flochberg	(Germany)	8 Feb	Henry Berengar of the House of Hohenstaufen defeats the House of Welf.
1150	Crusades	Battle of Aintab	(Turkey)	Aug	Kingdom of Jerusalem under Baldwin III of Jerusalem has tactical victory, but strategic defeat against the Zengid dynasty.
1150	Byzantine–Serbian wars/Byzantine–Hungarian War (1149–1155)	Battle of Tara	(Montenegro) / (Bosnia and Herzegovina)	Autumn	Emperor Manuel I Komnenos of the Byzantine Empire defeats Serbia and Hungary.
1151		Battle of Móin Mhór	(Republic of Ireland)		Kingdom of Leinster defeats Kingdom of Thomond.
1151		Battle of Ghazni	(Afghanistan)		Ghurid dynasty again defeats Ghaznavids and destroys the city.
1152		Battle of Nab	(Afghanistan)	24 June	Seljuks defeat Ghurid dynasty.
1152		Battle of Mamistra	(Turkey)		Lord Thoros II of the Armenian Kingdom of Cilicia defeats emperor Manuel I Komnenos of the Byzantine Empire.
1153	Crusader–Fatimid wars	Battle of Ascalon	(Israel)	25 Jan – 22 Aug	Jerusalem captures Ascalon from the Fatimid Egyptians.
1154	Wars of the Guelphs and Ghibellines	Battle of Vernavola	(Italy)	Aug	Milan fails to defeat Pavia.
1155	Wars of the Guelphs and Ghibellines	Siege of Tortona	(Italy)	13 Feb – 18 April	The army of king Frederick I of Germany defeats the city of Tortona.
1155		Siege of Marrakesh	(Morocco)		Almohads suppress rebellion in their capital.
1156	Byzantine–Norman Wars	Battle of Brindisi	(Italy)	28 May	The Norman Kingdom of Sicily defeats the Byzantine Empire forces at the siege of Brindisi.
1157	Abbasid-Seljuq Wars	Siege of Baghdad	(Iraq)	12 Jan – 3 July	Abbasids repel a Seljuk attempt to conquer Baghdad.
1157	Crusades	Battle of Lake Huleh	(Israel)	June	Zengids ambush and defeat Crusaders.
1157	Danish Civil War	Battle of Grathe Heath	(Denmark)	23 Oct	Valdemar I of Denmark defeats and kills Sweyn III.
1157		Battle of Coed Eulo	(Wales)		Henry II's invasion of Wales suffers a severe check near Basingwerk by Owain Gwynedd, though the situation is recovered, and a peace agreement later signed that cedes much of modern-day Flintshire to England.
1158	Wars of the Guelphs and Ghibellines	Siege of Milan	(Italy)	6 Aug – 7 Sep	Milan surrenders to Frederick I, Holy Roman Emperor.
1159	Wars of the Guelphs and Ghibellines	Siege of Crema	(Italy)	2 July 1159—25 Jan 1160	The army of Frederick I, Holy Roman Emperor captures Crema.
1159	Wars of the Guelphs and Ghibellines	Battle of Siziano	(Italy)	15 July	An army of Frederick I, Holy Roman Emperor defeats Milan.
1160		Battle of Lobregal	(Spain)	Mar	Fernando Rodríguez de Castro defeats Nuño Pérez de Lara for the control of the regency of the minor king Alfonso VIII of Castile.
1160	Wars of the Guelphs and Ghibellines	Battle of Carcano	(Italy)	9 Aug	Milan defeats an army of Frederick I, Holy Roman Emperor.
1160	Almohad conquest of Norman Africa		(Tunisia)		Almohad Caliphate captures Mahdia, ending Norman rule in Africa.
1161	Civil war era in Norway	Battle of Oslo	(Norway)	3 Feb	King Haakon II of Norway defeats and kills Inge Haraldsson.
1161	Wars of the Guelphs and Ghibellines	Siege of Milan	(Italy)	30 May 1161—28 Feb 1162	The army of Frederick I, Holy Roman Emperor captures and destroys Milan.
1161	Georgian–Seljuk wars	Siege of Ani	(Turkey)	Aug	Georgian kingdom decisively repels invasion by the Seljuk dynasty.
1161	Jin–Song Wars	Battle of Tangdao	(China)	16 Nov	Song victory over Jin.
1161	Jin–Song Wars	Battle of Caishi	(China)	26–27 Nov	Song dynasty defeats Jurchen Jin dynasty.
1161	Portuguese Reconquista	Battle of Alcácer do Sal	(Portugal)		The Almohad Caliphate under Abu Mohammed Abdallah Ben Hafs defeats king Afonso I of Portugal.
1163	Crusades	Battle of al-Buqaia	(Lebanon)		Crusaders defeat Zengids.
1164		Battle of Verchen	(Germany)	16 July	A Christian army from Germany and Denmark, under Duke Henry the Lion of Saxony, defeats the Obotrites under prince Pribislav.
1164	Crusades	Battle of Harim	(Syria)	12 Aug	A Crusader alliance is defeated by the Zengids.
1165		Battle of Fahs al-Jullab	(Spain)	15 Oct	Almohads defeat Taifa of Murcia.
1165	Portuguese Reconquista	Battle of Palmela	(Portugal)		King Afonso I of Portugal defeats the Almohad Caliphate.
1166 or 1167	Byzantine–Serbian wars	Battle of Pantina	(Kosovo)		Stefan Nemanja usurps the Serbian throne from his older brother, defeating both his forces and the Byzantine Empire who was assisting him.
1167	Crusades	Battle of al-Babein	(Egypt)	18 March	Crusaders under Amalric I battle the Zengids of Syria, ending in a tactical draw.
1167	Wars of the Guelphs and Ghibellines	Battle of Monte Porzio	(Italy)	29 May	Imperialists under Christian of Mainz and Rainald of Dassel defeat large Roman army.
1167	Komnenian restoration	Battle of Sirmium	(Serbia)	8 July	Byzantine Empire defeats Hungary.
1167	Crusades	Siege of Alexandria	(Egypt)	Summer	Negotiated settlement, which saw Alexandria handed over to the Fatimid vizier Shawar.
1169	Anglo-Norman invasion of Ireland	Siege of Wexford	(Republic of Ireland)	May	Wexford and parts of southeast Leinster come under Norman control.
1169	Rise of Saladin in Egypt	Battle of the Blacks	(Egypt)	21–23 Aug	Saladin's army defeats the pro-Fatimid forces in the Egyptian army to take control of Egypt.
1169	Crusades	Siege of Damietta	(Egypt)	27 Oct–16 Dec	Saladin victory.
1170	Danish Crusades	Battle of Julin Bridge	(Poland)		King Valdemar I of Denmark defeats Bogusław I, Duke of Pomerania-Stettin and Casimir I, Duke of Pomerania-Demmin and makes an end to the Pomeranian raids on Danish territory.
1171	Anglo-Norman invasion of Ireland	Siege of Dublin	(Republic of Ireland)	Aug—Sep	Irish siege of city repelled by England.
1171 or 1172	Pandyan Civil War (1169–1177)	Sinhalese offensive	(India)		Sinhalese defeated.
1173	Revolt against Henry II	Battle of Fornham	(England)	17 Oct	English royalists defeat rebels and capture Robert de Beaumont, 3rd Earl of Leicester.
1173 or 1174	Caspian expeditions of the Rus'	Siege of Derbent	(Russia)		Shirvanese and Georgian allies under George III capture the city of Derbent from Rus', Alan and Kipchak raiders.
1174	Revolt against Henry II	Battle of Alnwick	(England)	13 July	William I of Scotland is defeated and captured by a small English force.
1174	Wars of the Guelphs and Ghibellines	Siege of Alessandria	(Italy)	24 October 1174—12 April 1175	The army of Frederick I, Holy Roman Emperor fails to capture Alessandria.
1174	Anglo-Norman invasion of Ireland	Battle of Thurles	(Republic of Ireland)	Oct	Irish alliance led by High King Ruaidrí Ua Conchobair defeats English under Richard de Clare, 2nd Earl of Pembroke.
c.1175		Battle of Goggasthana	(India)		Chaulukyas defeats Paramaras under Vindhyavarman, temporarily halting his campaigns against them.
1175	Ayyubid-Zengid war	Battle of the Horns of Hama	(Syria)	13 April	Ayyubids under Saladin defeat the Turkish Zengid dynasty and gain control of Damascus, Baalbek, and Homs.
1176	Wars of the Guelphs and Ghibellines	Battle of Legnano	(Italy)	29 May	Lombard League defeats and wounds the Holy Roman Emperor Frederick Barbarossa.
1176	Byzantine–Seljuq Wars	Battle of Myriokephalon	(Turkey)	17 Sep	Seljuk Turks defeat army of Emperor Manuel I Comnenus of the Byzantine Empire in Phrygia.
1176	Ghurid campaigns in India	Siege of Uch	(Pakistan)		Ghurid King Muhammad Ghori takes Uch from either the Bhati Rajputs or the Qarmatians.
1177	Khmer–Cham wars	Battle of Tonlé Sap	(Cambodia)	13 June	Chams loot Khmer capital in a naval battle and kill their king Tribhuvanaditya.
1177	Crusades	Battle of Montgisard	(Israel)	25 Nov	Ayyubids under Saladin are defeated by the Kingdom of Jerusalem and the Knights Templar.
1177	Byzantine–Seljuq wars	Battle of Hyelion and Leimocheir	(Turkey)		Byzantines decisively defeat Seljuk army.
1178	Ghurid campaigns in India	Battle of Kasahrada	(India)		Coalition of Rajput Kings led by Mularaja II defeat Ghurid invasion and wound Muhammad Ghori.
1179		Battle of Loděnice	(Czech Republic)	23 Jan	Civil war in Bohemia. Soběslav defeats Frederick, Duke of Bohemia.
1179		Siege of Taillebourg	(France)	May	A young Richard the Lionheart takes a rebel castle in Aquitaine which was previously considered impregnable.
1179	Crusades	Battle of Marj Ayyun	(Lebanon)	10 June	Ayyubids under Saladin defeat the Kingdom of Jerusalem and the Knights Templar, Baldwin IV of Jerusalem nearly captured.
1179	Crusades	Battle of Jacob's Ford	(Israel)	23–30 Aug	Saladin defeats the Kingdom of Jerusalem.
1180	Genpei War	First Battle of Uji	(Japan)	20 June	Taira clan defeats Minamoto clan, killing Prince Mochihito.
1180	Genpei War	Battle of Ishibashiyama	(Japan)	14 Sep	Taira victory near Mount Fuji.
1180	Genpei War	Battle of Fujigawa	(Japan)	9 Nov	Taira forces flee after a fake surprise attack by the Minamoto and Takeda clans.
1181	Genpei War	Siege of Nara	(Japan)	15 Jan	The Taira clan destroys the city.
1181	Genpei War	Battle of Yahagigawa	(Japan)	Spring	Minamoto clan forced to withdraw, but Taira clan unable to pursue.
1181	Genpei War	Battle of Sunomatagawa	(Japan)	6 June	Minamoto sneak attack thwarted, Taira are victorious.
1182	Crusades	Battle of Belvoir Castle	(Israel)	July—Aug	Inconclusive battle between Baldwin IV of Jerusalem and an Ayyubid army of Saladin from Egypt.
1183	Genpei War	Siege of Hiuchi	(Japan)	April—May	Taira clan captures the fortress, but Minamoto defenders escape.
1183	Genpei War	Battle of Kurikara	(Japan)	2 June	Decisive Minamoto victory, turning the tides.
1183	Genpei War	Battle of Shinohara	(Japan)	Summer	Minamoto victory. Several single combats prior to main battle.
1183	Crusades	Battle of Al-Fule	(Israel)	30 Sep – 6 Oct	Inconclusive battle between Guy of Lusignan and the Ayyubid army of Saladin from Egypt.
1183	Crusades	Siege of Kerak	(Jordan)	Early Nov—4 Dec	Saladin lays siege to Raynald of Châtillon's stronghold during marriage of Humphrey IV of Toron and Isabella of Jerusalem. King Baldwin IV's arrival forces Saladin to withdraw.
1183	Genpei War	Battle of Mizushima	(Japan)	17 Nov	Taira naval victory over the Minamoto.
1183	Genpei War	Siege of Fukuryūji	(Japan)		Minamoto forces capture the fortress.
1183	Genpei War	Battle of Muroyama	(Japan)		The Taira clan's five-wave assault defeats Minamoto forces.
1184	Genpei War	Second Battle of Uji	(Japan)	19 Feb	Minamoto no Yoshinaka defeated by the rest of the Minamoto, forced away from the capital at Kyoto.
1184	Genpei War	Battle of Awazu	(Japan)	21 Feb	Minamoto no Yoshinaka killed.
1184	Genpei War	Battle of Ichi-no-Tani	(Japan)	20 March	Minamoto victory, Taira no Tadanori killed.
1184	Rus'–Cuman wars	Battle of the Orel River	(Ukraine)	30 Jul	Grand Prince Sviatoslav III of Kievan Rus', prince Rurik Rostislavich of Bilhorod Kyivskyi, prince Vladimir III Glebovich of the Principality of Pereyaslavl and prince Gleb Yurievich of Dubrovytsia defeat chieftain Kobyak of the Cumans.
1184	Genpei War	Battle of Kojima	(Japan)		Minamoto victory over the Taira.
1184	Genpei War	Siege of Hōjūjidono	(Japan)		Minamoto no Yoshinaka's faction captures Emperor Go-Shirakawa.
1184	Portuguese Reconquista and Almohad wars	Siege of Santarém	(Portugal)		Abu Yaqub Yusuf besieges Santarém but fails to capture the Portuguese city.
1184		Battle of Nagor	(India)		Chahamana King Prithviraj Chauhan defeats Chaulukyas.
1185	Genpei War	Battle of Yashima	(Japan)	22 March	Taira forces confounded and defeated.
1185	Genpei War	Battle of Dan-no-ura	(Japan)	25 April	Decisive victory for the Minamoto. Last battle of Genpei War.
1185	Third Norman invasion of the Balkans	Sack of Thessalonica	(Greece)	9–24 Aug	Byzantine city sacked by the Kingdom of Sicily.
1185	Third Norman invasion of the Balkans	Battle of Demetritzes	(Greece)	7 Nov	Alexios Branas decisively defeats Norman invasion army.
1186	Ghurid campaigns in India	Siege of Lahore	(Pakistan)		Muhammad Ghori defeats the Ghaznavids, conquering their last territory and acquiring much of the Punjab.
1187	Crusades	Battle of Cresson	(Israel)	1 May	Al-Afdal (Saladin's eldest son) defeats the small crusader army at Nazareth.
1187	Swedish–Novgorodian Wars	Pillage of Sigtuna	(Sweden)	Summer	Karelians burn Swedish city.
1187	Crusades	Battle of Hattin	(Israel)	4 July	Saladin destroys the Crusader army and takes several commanders prisoner.
1187	Crusades	Siege of Jerusalem	(Israel) / (Palestine)	20 Sep – 2 Oct	Saladin captures Jerusalem after 2 weeks of siege.
1187	Crusades	Siege of Tyre	(Lebanon)	12 November 1187—1 Jan 1188	Crusaders led by Conrad of Montferrat successfully defend city from Saladin.
1187	Rise of Genghis Khan	Battle of the Thirteen Wings	(Mongolia)		Inconclusive battle between Temujin and Jamukha.
1187	Rise of Genghis Khan	Battle of Dalan Balzhut	(Mongolia)		Jamukha decisively defeats Temujin.
1188		Battle of Nettur	(India)		Cholas defeat Vira Pandya, claimant to the Pandya throne.
1189	Third Crusade	Battle of Acre	(Israel)	28 August 1189—12 July 1191	Crusaders defeat Saladin's Ayyubid army outside Acre.
1190	Third Crusade	Battle of Philomelion	(Turkey)	7 May	Frederick VI, Duke of Swabia defeats a Seljuk Turk army.
1190	Third Crusade	Battle of Iconium	(Turkey)	18 May	Frederick Barbarossa's forces defeat Seljuk Turks.
1190	Almohad wars	Siege of Tomar	(Portugal)	13–19 July	Portuguese Knights Templar defend their base from a siege by the Almohads.
1190		Battle of Merv	(Turkmenistan)		Muhammad Ghori defeats Sultan Shah of Khwarezm.
1190		Battle of Pašman	(Croatia)		A fleet of prince Desinjin Damjan of Zadar, Pisa, Dalmatian city-states and Hungary-Croatia defeat doge Orio Mastropiero of Venice.
1191	Ghurid campaigns in India	First Battle of Tarain	(India)	14 Jan	Chahamana King Prithviraj Chauhan repels Ghurid invasion of Muhammad Ghori.
1191	Third Crusade	Battle of Arsuf	(Israel)	7 Sep	Richard Lionheart's forces repel Saladin's attack.
1191	Byzantine–Serbian wars	Battle of Morava	(Serbia) / (Kosovo)	Autumn	Emperor Isaac II Angelos defeats grand prince Stefan Nemanja of Serbia.
1191	Third Crusade		(Cyprus)		Richard the Lionhearted founds the crusader Kingdom of Cyprus after taking the island from Byzantine governor Isaac Komnenos.
1192	Third Crusade	Battle of Jaffa	(Israel)	5 Aug	Richard I's Crusader army defeats Saladin.
1192	Ghurid campaigns in India	Second Battle of Tarain	(India)		Muhammad Ghori defeats Prithviraj Chauhan, who is dismounted and escapes on a horse but is later caught, captured, and executed. Ghurids annex Delhi and much of northwest India.
1192	Feudal fragmentation of Poland	Battle of Drohiczyn	(Poland)		Kingdom of Poland defeats the alliance of Kievan Rus' and the Yotvingians.
1194	Seljuk-Khwarazmian Wars	Battle of Rey	(Iran)	19 March	Khwarazmians decisively defeat the Seljuks, killing Sultan Tughril III and annexing his remaining territories.
1194		Siege of Nottingham	(England)	25–28 March	Upon his return to England, Richard the Lionhearted takes Nottingham castle from his brother Prince John's attempt to keep the throne after a brief siege.
1194	War of the Namen-Luxembourg Succession	Battle of Noville	(Belgium)	1 Aug	Baldwin V, Count of Hainaut, Flanders and Namur defeats a Holy Roman Imperial army under Henry III, Duke of Limburg. Baldwin is able to keep his possessions, that are half in France and half in Germany (Holy Roman Empire).
1194		Battle of Aberconwy	(Wales)		Llywelyn ap Iorwerth defeats his brother and assumes control of Gwynedd.
1194	Byzantine–Bulgarian Wars	Battle of Arcadiopolis	(Turkey)		Bulgarians defeat Byzantines.
1194	Ghurid campaigns in India	Battle of Chandawar	(India)		Muhammad Ghori defeats and kills Jaichand of Kannauj of the Gahadavala dynasty.
1195	Georgian–Seljuk wars	Battle of Shamkor	(Azerbaijan)	1 June	Kingdom of Georgia decisively defeats the Atabegs of Azerbaijan.
1195	Reconquista and Almohad wars	Battle of Alarcos	(Spain)	18 July	Almohad victory over Alfonso VIII of Castile.
1195		Battle of Mozgawa	(Poland)	13 September	Civil war in Poland. Indecisive battle between a coalition of voivode Mikołaj Gryfita of Kraków Land, prince Roman the Great of the Principality of Volhynia and voivode Goworek of Sandomierz against duke Mieszko III of the Duchy of Greater Poland, Mieszko Tanglefoot and Jarosław, Duke of Opole.
1196	Byzantine–Bulgarian Wars	Battle of Serres	(Greece)		Bulgarian victory over Byzantines.
1196	Ghurid campaigns in India	Siege of Gwailor	(India)		Ghurids under Muhammad of Ghor defeats and conquers Kachchhapaghata dynasty.
1197	Ghurid campaigns in India	Battle of Kasahrada	(India)	4 Feb	Ghurid Empire defeats Rajput Confederation led by Chaulukya King Bhima II, leading to the Ghurid annexation of Anhilwara.
1198		Battle of Gisors	(France)	27 Sep	Richard I of England defeats Philip II of France.
1199		Siege of Château de Châlus-Chabrol	(France)	March-April	Richard I of England gets shot by a crossbow while besieging the tiny castle "Château de Châlus-Chabrol" and later dies from his wound.

== 13th century ==
Year	War	Battle	Loc.	Date(s)	Description
1201	Danish Crusades	Battle of Stellau	(Germany)		King Valdemar II of Denmark defeats count Adolf III of Holstein and Schauenburg, and captures Holstein from Germany.
1201	Rise of Genghis Khan	Battle of the Thirteen Sides	(Mongolia)		Temujin and his coalition of Mongol tribes decisively defeat Jamukha, the Naimans, Tatars, Merkits, Taichuud, Jadarans, and smaller tribes not allied with his coalition.
1201	Ghurid conquests	Battle of Nishapur	(Iran)		Ghurids annex Greater Khorasan from the Khwarazmian Empire
1202	Anglo-French War	Battle of Mirebeau	(France)	1 Aug	Mercenary army led by John of England defeat a rebel army led by the House of Lusignan and Arthur of Brittany as well as a French army.
1202	Fourth Crusade	Siege of Zadar	(Croatia)	10–24 Nov	The crusaders besieged the fortified city of Zadar in Croatia according to an agreement with the Republic of Venice and captured and sacked it, despite letters from Pope Innocent III forbidding such an action and threatening excommunication.
1202	Georgian–Seljuk wars	Battle of Basian	(Turkey)		Georgians under David Soslan decisively defeat Seljuk Turks.
1202	Rise of Genghis Khan	Battle of Köyiten	(Mongolia)		Temujin and Toghrul Khan make forces of Buyruq khan, Jamukha and the Oirats retreat but both armies are scattered.
1203	Fourth Crusade	Siege of Constantinople	(Turkey)	11 July – 1 Aug	Crusaders capture the Byzantine throne and install Alexios IV Angelos
1203	Anglo-French War	Siege of Château Gaillard	(France)	Aug 1203—6 March 1204	French forces under Philip II of France defeat the English and Normans during a lengthy siege. English relief force is decisively defeated. Phillip gains control of Normandy from the Kingdom of England.
1203	Rise of Genghis Khan	Battle of Khalakhaljid Sands	(Mongolia)		Forces led by Jamukha and Toghrul Khan defeat Temujin. Temujin's son Ogodei Khan is wounded.
1203	Ghurid campaigns in India	Siege of Kalinjar	(India)		Ghurids annex Kalinjar from Chandelas.
1204	Fourth Crusade	Sack of Constantinople	(Turkey)	12–15 April	Crusaders and Venetians capture Constantinople.
1204	Khwarazmian-Ghurid wars	Battle of Qarasu	(Turkmenistan)		Khwarazmians defeat Ghurids.
1204	Khwarazmian-Ghurid wars	Battle of Andkhud	(Afghanistan)		Khwarazmian Empire and Qara Khitai defeat Ghurid Empire, annexing back Khurasan. Muhammad of Ghor wounded.
1204	Genghis Khan's campaigns	Battle of Chakirmaut	(Mongolia)		Temujin decisively defeats the larger forces of the Naimans under Tayang Khan and his son Kuchlug, joined by Jamukha's forces. Tayang dies in battle, Jamukha is captured by Temujin and executed. As a result of this battle, Mongolia is unified under Temujin.
1205	Nicaean–Latin wars	Battle of Adramyttion	(Turkey)	19 March	Latins defeat Nicaea.
1205	Bulgarian–Latin wars	Battle of Adrianople	(Turkey)	14 April	The Bulgarian army defeats the Latin Empire and captures Baldwin I of Constantinople.
1205	Bulgarian–Latin wars	Battle of Serres	(Greece)	June	The Bulgarian army defeats the captures Serres.
1205	Feudal fragmentation of Poland	Battle of Zawichost	(Poland)	19 June or 14 Oct	Lesser Poland defeats Galicia-Volhynia.
1205	Fourth Crusade	Battle of the Olive Grove of Kountouras	(Greece)	Summer	Franks defeat local Greek resistance to Frankish rule and solidify Crusader control over the Peloponnese.
1205		Sack of Madurai	(India)		Cholas under Kulothunga III sack Pandya capital of Madurai.
1206	Bulgarian–Latin wars	Battle of Rusion	(Turkey)	31 Jan	Bulgarians win major victory over the Latin Empire.
1206	Bulgarian–Latin wars	Battle of Rodosto	(Turkey)	Feb	Bulgarians defeat Latin Empire.
1206	Ghurid campaigns in India	Battle of Jhelum	(Pakistan)	Feb—March	Ghurids defeat rebellion by Hindu Khokhars.
1207	Byzantine–Seljuk wars	Siege of Antalya	(Turkey)	March	Turks capture Byzantine city.
1207	Bulgarian–Latin wars	Battle of Messinopolis	(Greece)	4 Sep	Bulgarians defeat Latin Empire. Boniface of Montferrat killed.
1208	Dano-Swedish wars	Battle of Lena	(Sweden)	31 Jan	Swedish armed peasants defeat Danish army.
1208	Age of the Sturlungs	Battle of Víðines	(Iceland)		The forces of Bishop Guðmundur Arason defeat forces under the Icelandic Gothi one of which Kolbeinn Tumason was killed in the conflict.
1209	Albigensian Crusade	Siege of Carcassonne	(France)	1–15 August	Crusaders led by Arnaud Amalric capture Carcassonne.
1209	Revolt of Husain ibn Kharmil	Siege of Herat	(Afghanistan)		Khwarazmian Empire puts down Ghurid revolt.
1210	Albigensian Crusade	Siege of Minerve	(France)	Early June—22 July	Crusaders under Simon de Montfort capture Minerve from the Cathars under Guilhem de Minerve.
1210	Albigensian Crusade	Siege of Termes	(France)	Early Aug—22 Nov	Crusaders under Simon de Montfort capture Termes from the Seigneurie of Termes.
1210	Livonian Crusade	Battle of Ümera	(Latvia)	Aug or Sep	Estonian forces defeat the Livonian Order.
1210	Livonian Crusade	Battle of Cēsis	(Latvia)		Livonian Order defeats Estonians.
1211	Albigensian Crusade	Siege of Lavaur	(France)	March—3 May	Crusaders under Simon de Montfort capture Lavaur from the Siegneurie of Lavaur.
1211	Albigensian Crusade	Battle of Montgey	(France)	April	Raymond-Roger, Count of Foix defeats an army of Crusaders.
1211	Livonian Crusade	Battle of Viljandi	(Estonia)	Spring	Livonians defeat Estonians.
1211	Byzantine–Seljuk wars	Battle of Antioch on the Meander	(Turkey)	17 June	Nicaea defeats Sultanate of Rum.
1211	Livonian Crusade	Battle of Turaida	(Latvia)	Summer	Livonian Order defeats Oeselians and other Estonians.
1211	Mongol–Jin War	Battle of Yehuling	(China)	Aug—Oct	Genghis Khan decisively defeats the Jin dynasty.
1211	Nicaean–Latin wars	Battle of the Rhyndacus	(Turkey)	15 Oct	the Latin emperor Henry of Flanders defeats the Nicaean emperor Theodore I Lascaris.
1211		First Battle of Ulrichen	(Switzerland)		Canton of Valais defeats city of Bern.
1212	Reconquista and Almohad wars	Battle of Las Navas de Tolosa	(Spain)	16 July	Almohads expelled from most of Iberia by a joint army of the Christian kingdoms of Castile, León, Portugal, Navarre, and Aragon.
1213	Anglo-French War	Battle of Damme	(Belgium)	30–31 May	English under William Longsword, Earl of Salisbury, sink most of fleet of France's King Philip II in the harbor of Damme.
1213	Albigensian Crusade	Battle of Muret	(France)	12 Sep	French crusaders under Simon de Montfort defeat forces of Aragon and Catalonia, killing King Peter II of Aragon. End of Aragonese intervention in Languedoc.
1213		Battle of Steppes	(Belgium)	13 Oct	Brabantine defeat against Bishopric of Liège and County of Loon.
1213	Georgian–Seljuk wars	Siege of Ganja	(Azerbaijan)		After the Eldiguzid ruler of Ganja stopped paying tribute to George IV of Georgia, he attacked and captured the city.
1214	Anglo-French War	Battle of Bouvines	(France)	27 July	France under King Philip Augustus defeats England (under John Lackland) and Otto IV of Germany, conquering Flanders and Angevin territories in France, and bringing about the final decision in the German Staufen–Welf rivalry in favor of Frederick II.
1214	Byzantine–Seljuq wars	Siege of Sinope	(Turkey)	1 Nov	Seljuks capture Sinope from Byzantines.
1215	Livonian Crusade	Battle of Lehola	(Estonia)	Spring	Livonians defeat Estonians.
1215	Livonian Crusade	Battle of Riga	(Latvia)	Late April or early May	Livonians defeat Oeselians and other Estonians.
1215	Mongol–Jin War	Battle of Zhongdu	(China)		Genghis Khan and the Mongols defeat the Jin dynasty and capture Zhongdu (now Beijing).
1215		Siege of Firozkoh	(Afghanistan)		Sultanate of Firozkoh defeated and annexed by Muhammad II of Khwarazm.
1216	Ghurid campaigns in India	Third Battle of Tarain	(India)	31 Jan	Mamluk Delhi Sultanate led by their King Iltutmish defeat Ghurid remnants led by Taj al-Din Yildiz.
1216	Vladimir-Suzdal war of succession	Battle of Lipitsa	(Russia)	22 April	Konstantin of Rostov defeats his younger brothers, Yuri and Yaroslav.
1216	Albigensian Crusade	Siege of Beaucaire	(France)	3 June – 24 Aug	Crusaders under Simon de Montfort fail to capture Beaucaire. Raymond VII, Count of Toulouse was entrenched in Beaucaire with an army.
1217	Livonian Crusade	Battle of Otepää	(Estonia)	Feb	Estonian and Russian victory over the Livonian Order.
1217	First Barons' War	Battle of Lincoln	(England)	20 May	English forces under William, Earl of Pembroke defeat the French.
1217	First Barons' War	Battle of Sandwich	(England)	24 Aug	Fleet of English Hubert and Burgh defeat French fleet of Eustace the Monk off Dover.
1217	Northern Crusades	Battle of St. Matthew's Day	(Estonia)	21 Sep	The Livonian Order and its allies defeat Estonians.
1217	Albigensian Crusade	Siege of Toulouse	(France)	22 Sep 1217 – 25 July 1218	Crusaders under Simon de Montfort fail to Capture Toulouse.
1217	Mongol conquest of the Qara Khitai	Siege of Kashgar	(China)		With little resistance from the city's population, Mongols conquer the Kara-Khitai. Kuchlug captured and executed soon after.
1218	Fifth Crusade	Siege of Damietta	(Egypt)	29 May 1218 – early Nov 1219	The Crusaders successfully besiege and capture the city from the Ayyubids.
1218	Albigensian Crusade	Siege of Marmande	(France)	Oct 1218 – June 1219	King Louis VIII of France captures Marmande from the County of Toulouse.
1218	Mongol conquest of the Qara Khitai	Siege of Balasagun	(Kyrgyzstan)		Mongols under Genghis Khan defeat Kuchlug's army and take capital of the Kara Khitai.
1219	Northern Crusades	Battle of Lindanise	(Estonia)	15 June	Danish forces under Valdemar II defeat the Estonians.
1219	Albigensian Crusade	Battle of Baziège	(France)	Spring	Raymond VII, Count of Toulouse and Raymond-Roger, Count of Foix defeat Crusaders under Foucault de Bercy, Alain de Roucy, Hugh de Lacy, 1st Earl of Ulster and Sicard VI de Lautrec.
1219	Albigensian Crusade	Siege of Toulouse	(France)	17 June – 1 Aug	King Louis VIII of France fails to capture Toulouse.
1219	Mongol invasion of the Khwarazmian Empire	Siege of Otrar	(Kazakhstan)	Dec 1219 – Feb 1220	Mongol forces besiege and take the border town of Otrar in the Khwarazmian Empire.
1219	Mongol invasions of Korea	Siege of Kangdong	(North Korea)		Mongols allied with Goryeo take Kangdong, the last Khitan stronghold.
1220	Mongol invasion of the Khwarazmian Empire	Siege of Bukhara	(Uzbekistan)	Feb	Mongols take lightly fortified Khwarezmian city and raze most of it to the ground.
1220	Mongol invasion of the Khwarazmian Empire	Siege of Samarkand	(Uzbekistan)	March	Mongols take capital of the Khwarezmian Empire.
1220	Livonian Crusade	Battle of Lihula	(Estonia)	8 Aug	Invading Swedish forces are defeated by Estonians.
1221	War of the Galician Succession (1205–1245)	Battle of Halych	(Ukraine)	24 Mar	Prince Daniel of the Principality of Volhynia and prince Mstislav Mstislavich of Novgorod defeat military leader File Szeretvai of Hungary. Hungary was aided by the Duchy of Kraków and the Duchy of Sandomierz.
1221	Mongol conquest of the Khwarazmian Empire	Siege of Gurganj	(Turkmenistan)	Oct 1220 – Apr 1221	Mongols take city from the Khwarezmian Empire.
1221	Mongol conquest of the Khwarazmian Empire	Siege of Merv	(Turkmenistan)	April	Mongols under Tolui take Khwarazmian city. Mongols massacre almost entire population of city.
1221	Jōkyū War	Battle of Uji	(Japan)	May	Kamakura shogunate defeats loyalists of Emperor Go-Toba, who is exiled.
1221	Mongol conquest of the Khwarazmian Empire	Siege of Bamyan	(Afghanistan)	July	Mongols defeat Khwarezmian Empire.
1221	Crusades	Battle of Mansurah	(Egypt)	26–28 Aug	The Ayybid army of sultan al-Kamil defeats the Crusader army under papal legate Pelagio Galvani.
1221	Mongol conquest of the Khwarazmian Empire	Battle of Parwan	(Afghanistan)	Sep	Khwarezmian Empire defeats the Mongols.
1221	Mongol conquest of the Khwarazmian Empire	Battle of Indus	(Pakistan)	24 Nov	Mongols defeat and annex the Khwarezmian Empire.
1221	Livonian Crusade	Siege of Tallinn	(Estonia)		Estonians retreat from siege on Danish stronghold.
1222	Mongol invasions of Georgia	Battle of Khunan	(Azerbaijan)	Sep	Mongols under Subotai decisively defeat the Kingdom of Georgia and march north. George IV of Georgia mortally wounded.
1222	Byzantine–Seljuk wars	Siege of Trebizond	(Turkey)	1222–1223	Great Seljuq Empire attempt to conquer Trebizond, are defeated by Emperor Andronikos I Gidos.
1223	Mongol invasion of Kievan Rus'	Battle of Kalka River	(Ukraine)	31 May	The Mongols under Jebe and Subutai defeat an alliance of Kiev, Galicia-Volhynia, Chernigov, and the Cumans decisively.
1223	Mongol invasion of Volga Bulgaria	Battle of Samara Bend	(Russia)	Autumn	Volga Bulgaria wins tactical victory over the Mongols.
1223	Livonian Crusade	Battle of Viljandi	(Estonia)	29 Jan	Estonians defeat Livonians.
1223	Mongol conquest of Persia and Mesopotamia	Siege of Firozkoh	(Afghanistan)		Mongols under Tolui take Firozkoh and raze the city.
1224	Nicaean-Latin Wars	Battle of Poimanenon	(Turkey)	Early 1224	The Nicaean emperor John III Vatatzes defeats a joint army of the Latin Empire and of rebels under the brothers Isaac and Alexios Laskaris.
1224	Livonian Crusade	Siege of Tartu	(Estonia)	15 Aug	Livonians defeat Estonians and mercenaries from Novgorod and Pskov.
1225		Battle of Mölln	(Germany)	Jan	A coalition of German princes, Gerhard II (archbishop of Bremen and Hamburg), count Adolf IV of Holstein, Henry I, Count of Schwerin and Henry Borwin II, Lord of Mecklenburg defeat Denmark under Albrecht II of Holstein, and Otto.
1225	Jalal al-Din's invasions of Georgia	Battle of Garni	(Armenia)	Aug	Khwarezmid Empire under Jalal al-Din Mangburni, his realm conquered by the Mongols, defeats Kingdom of Georgia.
1226		Siege of Tbilisi	(Georgia (country))	9 March	After defeating Georgians in battle, Jalal al-Din Mangburni successfully besieges the capital city of Tbilisi. Queen Rusudan of Georgia fled to Kutaisi.
1226	Albigensian Crusades	Siege of Avignon	(France)	10 June – 9 Sep	King Louis VIII of France besieges the town of Avignon. After a three-month siege, it surrenders on terms.
1227	Livonian Crusade	Battle of Muhu	(Estonia)	Jan	Livonians decisively defeat Oeselians.
1227	Dano–German War	Battle of Bornhöved	(Germany)	22 July	Holstein and Hanseatic forces defeat the Danish king Valdemar II who has to relinquish the Northern German territories he had occupied with the exception of Rügen.
1227		Battle of Ane	(Netherlands)	28 July	Otto II of Lippe, Bishop of Utrecht, is defeated by the Drenths near Ane (modern Netherlands).
1227	Mongol conquest of Western Xia	Siege of Yinchuan	(China)		Mongols eliminate the Western Xia and execute Emperor Mozhu. Genghis Khan dies during the siege under debated circumstances, but this is kept secret from the army until the siege's end.
1228	Jalal al-Din's invasions of Georgia	Battle of Bolnisi	(Georgia (country))		Khwarazmian Empire again defeats Kingdom of Georgia.
1229	Ayyubid succession war	Siege of Damascus	(Syria)	March—15 June	Sultan al-Kamil of Egypt conquers Damascus from emir an-Nasir Dawud.
1229	Lombard League civil war	Battle of San Cesario	(Italy)	Aug	Modena, Cremona and Parma defeat Bologna, Milan and Piacenza.
1229	Reconquista	Battle of Portopí	(Spain)	12 Sep	Catalan forces led by King James I defeat the Almohads at Serra de Na Burguesa (present Palma de Mallorca).
1230	Byzantine–Bulgarian Wars	Battle of Klokotnitsa	(Bulgaria)	9 March	Victory for the Second Bulgarian Empire over the Despotate of Epirus.
1230	Battles involving Jalal al-Din	Battle of Yassıçemen	(Turkey)	10–12 Aug	Seljuk Turks defeat forces of Jalal al-Din Mangburni of Khwarazm.
1230	Norman wars in Ireland	Siege of Dun Beal Gallimhe	(Republic of Ireland)		Week-long inconclusive battle between the Irish and Normans.
1230	Reconquista	Battle of Alange	(Spain)		Leon defeats Almohads under Ibn Hud.
1231	Reconquista	Battle of Jerez	(Spain)	April	Castile defeats Moorish forces of Ibn Hud.
1231	Mongol invasions of Korea	Siege of Kuju	(North Korea)	Sep 1231—Jan 1232	Goryeo defeats Mongol attack.
1232	Mongol–Jin War	Battle of Sanfengshan	(China)	9 Feb	Mongols led by Subutai defeat last field army of Jin dynasty, leaving them prone to their upcoming conquest.
1232	Mongol–Jin War	Siege of Kaifeng	(China)	8 April 1232—29 May 1233	Mongols capture Kaifeng, the capital of the Jin dynasty.
1232	War of the Lombards	Battle of Agridi	(Cyprus) ( (Northern Cyprus) )	15 Jun	John, Old Lord of Beirut, regent of Cyprus, and king Henry I of Cyprus defeat the Holy Roman Empire and Genoa under military commander Richard Filangieri.
1232	Mongol invasions of Korea	Battle of Cheoin	(South Korea)	16 Dec	Goryeo decisively defeats Mongol attack.
1233	War of the Galician Succession (1205–1245)	Battle of Shumsk	(Ukraine)		Battle between prince Daniel of Galicia and prince Vasylko Romanovych of Belz versus king Andrew II of Hungary.
1233	Mongol–Jin War and Jin–Song Wars	Siege of Caizhou	(China)	Dec 1233—9 Feb 1234	Mongols under Ögedei Khan allied with the Song dynasty eliminate the Jin dynasty.
1234	Crusades	Battle of Altenesch	(Germany)	27 May	A crusader army (Stedinger Crusade) defeats the rebel peasants of Stedingen.
1235		Battle of Kirina	(Mali)		Sundiata Keita decisively defeats Sumanguru Kante, conquering Sosso and forming the Mali Empire.
1235	Nicaean–Latin wars and Bulgarian–Latin wars	Siege of Constantinople	(Turkey)		Niceans and Bulgarians fail to take Constantinople from the Latins.
1236	Livonian Crusade	Battle of Saule	(Lithuania)	22 Sep	Samogitians and Semigalians defeat Livonian Brothers of the Sword, whose remnants are incorporated into the Teutonic Knights.
1236	Mongol invasion of Volga Bulgaria	Siege of Bilär	(Russia)	Autumn	Mongols conquer Volga Bulgaria.
1236		Battle of Mahendramangalam	(India)		Hoysalas defeat Pandyas in South India.
1237	Reconquista	Battle of the Puig	(Spain)	15 Aug	Aragonese forces defeat the Almohad army at El Puig.
1237	Wars of the Guelphs and Ghibellines	Battle of Cortenuova	(Italy)	27 Nov	Emperor Frederick II defeats the Lombard League.
1237	Mongol invasion of Kievan Rus'	Siege of Ryazan	(Russia)	16–21 Dec	Mongols burn Ryazan to the ground. First Russian city sieged by Batu Khan.
1237	Mongol invasion of Kievan Rus'	Battle of Voronezh River	(Russia)	Dec	Mongols defeat Principality of Ryazan.
1237	Mongol invasion of Kievan Rus'	Siege of Kolomna	(Russia)	Dec 1237—Jan 1238	Mongol victory.
1238	Mongol invasion of Kievan Rus'	Siege of Moscow	(Russia)	15–20 Jan	Mongols take city of Moscow and execute Prince Vladimir.
1238	Mongol invasion of Kievan Rus'	Siege of Vladimir	(Russia)	3–8 Feb	Mongols take city of Vladimir.
1238	Mongol invasion of Kievan Rus'	Battle of the Sit River	(Russia)	4 March	Mongols led by Batu Khan defeat Vladimir-Suzdal forces, Prince Yuri II killed.
1238	Mongol invasion of Kievan Rus'	Siege of Kozelsk	(Russia)	March—May	Mongols defeat Principality of Chernigov and raze Kozelsk.
1238	Wars of the Guelphs and Ghibellines	Siege of Brescia	(Italy)	11 July – 7 Oct	Long unsuccessful siege during the war between Emperor Frederick II and the Guelphs in Northern Italy.
1239	Mongol invasion of Kievan Rus'	Sack of Chernigov	(Ukraine)	18 Oct	The Mongols sack the city of Chernigov.
1239	Barons' Crusade	Battle of Gaza	(Palestine)	13 Nov	The Crusaders under Theobald I of Navarre are defeated by an Ayyubid army at Gaza.
1240	Swedish–Novgorodian Wars	Battle of the Neva	(Russia)	15 July	Alexander Nevsky of the Novgorod Republic stops the Swedish invasion of Russia.
1240	Wars of the Guelphs and Ghibellines	Siege of Faenza	(Italy)	Aug 1240—14 April 1241	Long successful siege during the war between Frederick II and the Guelphs in Northern Italy.
1240	Mongol invasion of Kievan Rus'	Siege of Kiev	(Ukraine)	28 Nov – 6 Dec	The Mongols under Batu Khan besiege and sack the city of Kiev.
1241	First Mongol invasion of Poland	Sack of Sandomierz	(Poland)	13 Feb	The Mongols under Baidar Khan capture and devastate the city of Sandomierz.
1241	First Mongol invasion of Poland	Battle of Tursko	(Poland)	13 Feb	The Mongols under Baidar Khan defeat the Polish forces at Tursko Wielkie.
1241	First Mongol invasion of Poland	Battle of Tarczek	(Poland)	13 Feb	The Mongols under Kadan defeat the Polish forces at Tarczek.
1241	First Mongol invasion of Poland	Battle of Chmielnik	(Poland)	18 March	The Mongols under Baidar Khan defeat the Polish forces at Chmielnik.
1241	First Mongol invasion of Poland	Battle of Racibórz	(Poland)	20 March	The Polish forces under Mieszko II the Fat defeat the Mongols at Racibórz.
1241	First Mongol invasion of Poland	Sack of Kraków	(Poland)	22 or 28 March	The Mongols under Subutai capture and devastate the city of Kraków, massacring most of the inhabitants.
1241	First Mongol invasion of Poland	Battle of Opole	(Poland)	Early April	The Mongols defeat the Polish forces from Silesia and Lesser Poland provinces at Opole.
1241	First Mongol invasion of Poland	Battle of Liegnitz	(Poland)	9 April	Mongols of the Golden Horde defeat feudal nobility including Knights Templar in Silesia, killing King Henry II the Pious.
1241	First Mongol invasion of Hungary	Battle of Mohi	(Hungary)	11 April	The Mongol forces under Batu Khan and Subutai defeat the Hungarian army under King Béla IV at Mohi.
1241	Wars of the Guelphs and Ghibellines and Genoese-Pisan Wars	Battle of Giglio	(Italy)	3 May	The fleet of Frederick II, Holy Roman Emperor, commanded by Enzo of Sardinia defeats the Genoese fleet.
1241	Nicaean-Latin Wars	Battle of Constantinople	(Turkey)	May—June	Venetian fleets capture Constantinople.
1242	First Mongol invasion of Hungary	Siege of Esztergom	(Hungary)	Jan	Mongols destroy most of Hungarian city.
1242	Northern Crusades	Battle on Lake Peipus	(Estonia) / (Russia)	5 April	Alexander Nevsky defeats the alliance of Teutonic Knights, the Livonian Order, Denmark, and Dorpat.
1242	Saintonge War	Battle of Taillebourg	(France)	21–22 July	Louis IX of France defeats Henry III of England.
1242	First Mongol invasion of Hungary	Battle of Grobnik Field	(Croatia)		Legendary battle where Croatia defeated invading Mongols.
1243	Albigensian Crusade	Siege of Montségur	(France)	May 1243—16 March 1244	French royal forces besiege and capture the Cathar-held Château de Montségur, after a nine-month siege.
1243	Mongol invasions of Anatolia	Battle of Kösedağ	(Turkey)	26 June	The Mongols defeat the Seljuk Turks, making Anatolia and Trebizond vassal states of the Mongol Empire.
1243	Wars of the Guelphs and Ghibellines	Siege of Viterbo	(Italy)		Frederick II of Sicily unsuccessfully besieges Viterbo.
1244	Crusades	Siege of Jerusalem	(Israel)	15 July	Jerusalem is razed by the Khwarazmiyya allied with the Ayyubids.
1244	Crusades	Battle of La Forbie	(Israel)	17–18 Oct	Crusaders defeated by Ayyubids.
1245	War of the Galician Succession (1205–1245)	Battle of Yaroslavl	(Poland)	17 Aug	Prince Daniel of Galicia, prince Vasylko Romanovych of Belz, grand duke Mindaugas of Lithuania and duke Konrad I of Masovia defeat Rostislav Mikhailovich, military commander File Szeretvai of Hungary and commander Florian Wojciechowicz of the Duchy of Kraków.
1245	Reconquista	Siege of Jaén	(Spain)	1245—28 Feb 1246	Castilian forces under King Ferdinand III besiege Jaén during the winter. The city finally is handed over by Sultan Muhammad I of Granada.
1246		Battle of Laa an der Thaya	(Austria)	26 Jan	Duke Frederick II of Austria defeats Bohemia, under Ulrich of Carinthia.
1246	Age of the Sturlungs	Battle of Haugsnes	(Iceland)	19 April	The largest and bloodiest battle in Icelandic history where the forces of Thordur Kakali defeat Gissur Thorvaldsson.
1246		Battle of the Leitha River	(Hungary) / (Austria)	15 June	King Béla IV of Hungary defeated Duke Frederick II of Austria. Duke Frederick is killed, ending Austrian claims to the western counties of Hungary.
1246	Crusade against the Staufer	Battle of Frankfurt	(Germany)	5 Aug	An army of anti-king Henry Raspe defeats the Imperialst army of king Conrad IV of Germany.
1247	Reconquista and Almohad wars	Siege of Seville	(Spain)	1247—28 Nov 1248	Castilian forces under Ferdinand III besiege the city of Seville. Due to a famine, the Almohad garrison capitulates after a 16-month siege.
1247	Norman Invasion of Ireland	Sack of Dun Gallimhe	(Republic of Ireland)		Norman forces are defeated by the Irish.
1247	Norman Invasion of Ireland	Battle of Ballyshannon	(Republic of Ireland)		Norman forces under Maurice FitzGerald are ambushed and defeated by the Gaelic army.
1248	Wars of the Guelphs and Ghibellines	Battle of Parma	(Italy)	18 Feb	Frederick II of Sicily is defeated by the Lombard League.
1248	German civil war	Siege of Aachen	(Germany)	Late April or early May—Oct	Count William II of Holland captures Aachen and is crowned as king of Germany.
1248		Battle of Oujda	(Morocco)		Kingdom of Tlemcen beats back last-ditch invasion by Almohads and Marinids.
1249	Wars of the Guelphs and Ghibellines	Battle of Fossalta	(Italy)	26 May	King Enzio of Sardinia is captured by Bolognese in a clash between Guelphs and Ghibellines.
1249	Seventh Crusade	Siege of Damietta	(Egypt)	6 June	Crusaders gain strategic victory over the Ayyubids in the Seventh Crusade.
1249	Norman Invasion of Ireland	First Battle of Athenry	(Republic of Ireland)	15 Aug	Gaels of Connacht siege town but are repelled by the Normans.
1250	Seventh Crusade	Battle of Mansurah	(Egypt)	8–11 Feb	The Seventh Crusade is defeated at Al-Mansurah.
1250	Seventh Crusade	Battle of Fariskur	(Egypt)	6 April	Ayyubid Egyptians defeat Seventh Crusade forces of Louis IX of France, taking him prisoner.
1250	Wars of the Guelphs and Ghibellines	Battle of Cingoli	(Italy)		Papal and Guelph army is crushed by an Imperial and Italian army.
1251		Battle of al-Kura	(Egypt)	2 Feb	Atabak Aybak of Egypt defeats sultan An-Nasir Yusuf of the Ayyubid dynasty in Syria.
1253		Battle of Olomouc	(Czech Republic)	25 Jun	King Ottokar II of Bohemia defeats king Béla IV of Hungary.
1253		Battle of Westkapelle	(Netherlands)	4 July	A coalition army for king William of Germany, count of Holland defeats an army of Guy, Count of Flanders.
1254		Battle of Wülferichskamp	(Germany)	9 Oct	Konrad von Hochstaden, Archbishop of Cologne, defeats Bishop Simon I of Paderborn.
1254	Byzantine–Bulgarian Wars	Battle of Adrianople	(Turkey)		Nicaean forces under Theodore II Lascaris defeat the Bulgarians.
1255	Astigiani Wars and Wars of the Guelphs and Ghibellines	Battle of Montebruno	(Italy)	25 Feb	Astigiani defeats Thomas II of Savoy.
1255	Struggle for Gwynedd	Battle of Bryn Derwin	(Wales)	June	Llywelyn ap Gruffudd defeats his brother Owain ap Gruffudd and assumes control of Gwynedd.
1255	Battle between Obas of Benin and Ogiamien family	Battle of Ekiokpagha	(Nigeria)		Ewedo defeats Ogiamien III for the kingship of the Benin Empire.
1256	Mongol conquest of Persia	Battle of Mount Siyalan	(Iran)	12 June	Mongol forces under Baiju Noyan are defeated by the Nizaris.
1256	Mongol conquest of Persia	Siege of Firuzkuh	(Iran)		The Nizari garrison surrenders after a five or six-months siege to the Mongols.
1256	Mongol conquest of Persia	Siege of Maymun-Diz	(Iran)	8–23 Nov	Mongol forces under Hulagu Khan successfully besiege the mountain castle of Maymun-Diz. Imam Rukn al-Din Khurshah capitulates with most of the remaining garrison.
1256	Mongol conquest of Persia	Siege of Alamut	(Iran)	Dec	Hulagu Khan sieges capital of the Nizari Ismaili state in the mountains of southern Iran, the garrison capitulates.
1257		Battle of Cadfan	(Wales)		Decisive victory for the Welsh against the English.
1257	Norman wars in Ireland	Battle of Creadran Cille	(Republic of Ireland)		Norman forces are driven out of Lower Connacht by Gofraid O'Donnell, Irish ruler of Tyrconnell.
1257	Livonian Crusade	Battle of Memel	(Lithuania)		Samogitians defeat Livonian Order.
1258	First Mongol–Vietnamese War	Battle of Bình Lệ Nguyên	(Vietnam)	17 Jan	Mongols defeat Vietnam's Trần dynasty.
1258	Mongol conquest of Persia and Mesopotamia	Battle of Baghdad	(Iraq)	29 Jan – 10 Feb	Hulagu Khan of the Mongols defeats the Abbasid, executing the Caliph Al-Musta'sim and his family.
1258	War of the Euboeote Succession	Battle of Karydi	(Greece)	May/June	William II of Villehardouin Prince of Achaea, defeats a coalition of princes led by the Duke of Athens, Guy I de la Roche and ends the War of the Euboeote Succession.
1258	War of Saint Sabas	Battle of Acre	(Israel)	25 June	Fleet of the Republic of Venice defeats fleet of the Republic of Genoa off Acre. Genoese abandon Acre.
1259	Mongol conquest of the Song dynasty	Siege of Diaoyu Castle	(China)	Feb—Aug	Song dynasty keeps fortress from Mongol invasion and kills Möngke Khan.
1259	Wars of the Guelphs and Ghibellines	Battle of Cassano	(Italy)	16 Sep	Ezzelino III da Romano is defeated by the crusade army of the Guelphs.
1259	Nicaean–Latin wars and Epirote–Nicaean conflict	Battle of Pelagonia	(North Macedonia)	Sep	The Empire of Nicaea defeats Achaea, Epirus, and Sicily.
1259	Lithuanian Crusade	Battle of Skuodas	(Lithuania)		The Samogitian army invades Courland and defeats the Livonian Order.
1260	Mongol invasions of the Levant	Siege of Aleppo	(Syria)	18–24 Jan	Mongols under Hulagu Khan allied with Crusaders and Armenians defeat Ayyubids in Syria.
1260	Second Mongol invasion of Poland	Sack of Sandomierz	(Poland)	2 Feb	Mongols raze the Polish city Sandomierz to the ground.
1260	Livonian Crusade	Battle of Durbe	(Latvia)	13 July	Teutonic Knights and its branch Livonian Order are defeated by Samogitians, what triggers the Great Prussian Insurrection.
1260	War of the Babenberg Succession	Battle of Kressenbrunn	(Austria)	July	Bohemian and Austrian forces under Premysl Ottokar II defeat Béla IV of Hungary.
1260	Mongol invasions of the Levant	Battle of Ain Jalut	(Israel)	3 Sep	Egyptian Mamluk army defeats Mongols and Georgians north of Palestine.
1260	Wars of the Guelphs and Ghibellines	Battle of Montaperti	(Italy)	4 Sep	Sienese defeat Florentines (Guelphs and Ghibellines).
1260	Mongol invasions of the Levant	First Battle of Homs	(Syria)	10 Dec	Mamluks defeat Mongols.
1260	Nicaean–Latin wars	Siege of Constantinople	(Turkey)		Unsuccessful attack on the Constantinopolitan suburb of Galata by forces of the Empire of Nicaea.
1261	Struggle for Constantinople	Reconquest of Constantinople	(Turkey)	25 July	Re-establishment of the Byzantine Empire under the Palaiologos dynasty.
1261	Mongol conquest of Persia and Mesopotamia	Siege of Mosul (1261)	(Iraq)	late 1261 to August 1262	Mongol Victory .
1261	Norman wars in Ireland	Battle of Callann	(Republic of Ireland)	Aug	Finghin Mac Carthy of the Kingdom of Desmond defeats Normans.
1261	Mongol conquest of Persia and Mesopotamia	Anbar ambush	(Iraq)	October	Mongol victory, death of Al-Mustansir II the Abbasid caliph under Mamluk Authority.
1262	Pandya-Hoysala war	Battle of Kannanur koppam	(India)		Jatavarman Sundara Pandyan defeated Hoysalas.
1262		Battle of Hausbergen	(France)	8 March	The bourgeois of Strasbourg defeat the army of the bishop.
1262	Berke–Hulegu war	Battle of Terek River	(Russia)		Nogai Khan of Golden Horde defeats Hulagu. First open conflict in the Mongol Empire.
1263	Scottish–Norwegian War	Battle of Largs	(Scotland)	2 Oct	Scots versus Norwegians, no definitive victory for either.
1263	War of Saint Sabas	Battle of Settepozzi	(Greece)	First half of 1263	A Venetian fleet of 38 ships defeats a joint Byzantine-Genoese fleet of 48 ships off the Peloponnese.
1263	Byzantine-Latin Wars	Battle of Prinitza	(Greece)		The forces of the Principality of Achaea defeat a far larger Byzantine army.
1264	Second Barons' War	Battle of Northampton	(England)	5 April	(Second Barons' War) English forces retake Northampton Castle and capture Simon de Montfort's son.
1264	Second Barons' War	Battle of Lewes	(England)	14 May	English rebels under Simon de Montfort defeat Henry III of England.
1264	War of Saint Sabas	Battle of Saseno	(Albania)	14 Aug	A Genoese fleet tricks and captures a Venetian trade convoy near Saseno Island off the coast of Albania.
1264	Byzantine-Latin Wars	Battle of Makryplagi	(Greece)		The forces of the Principality of Achaea defeat a Byzantine army, taking their commanders prisoner.
1265	Hungarian Civil War	Battle of Isaszeg	(Hungary)	Early March	The forces of younger king Stephen defeat the royal army of king Béla IV, which results the permanent division of Hungary
1265	Crusades	Fall of Arsuf	(Israel)	21/22 March—29 April	The Mamluks of Cairo take Arsuf from the Knights Hospitaller.
1265	Second Barons' War	Battle of Evesham	(England)	4 Aug	English forces under Prince Edward defeat the rebels under Simon de Montfort, who is killed.
1266	Wars of the Guelphs and Ghibellines	Battle of Benevento	(Italy)	26 Feb	Charles of Anjou defeats Manfred of Sicily and conquers his kingdom.
1266	Second Barons' War	Battle of Chesterfield	(England)	15 May	English forces under Henry of Cornwall, nephew of King Henry III, defeat the rebels at Chesterfield.
1266	Crusades	Siege of Safed	(Israel)	13 June – 23 July	Egyptian Mamluk forces under Baibars capture the castle of Safed (defended by the Knights Templar) after a 6-week siege.
1266	Second Barons' War	Siege of Kenilworth	(England)	21 June – 13 Dec	English forces under Henry III capture Kenilworth Castle after a 6-month siege.
1266	War of Saint Sabas	Battle of Trapani	(Italy)	23 June	Venetian fleet captures Genoese fleet.
1266	Würzburg civil war	Battle on Cyriakus Day	(Germany)	8 Aug	A civil war in the Bishopric of Würzburg. The Cathedral chapter of Würzburg, the Hohenlohe family, and several Franconian knights, supporting Poppo III von Trimberg as the new bishop, commanded by cathedral dean Berthold von Sternberg, defeat Herman I, Count of Henneberg and the Castell family, supporting Berthold I von Henneberg.
1266	Wars of Cilician Armenia	Battle of Mari	(Turkey)	24 Aug	Mamluks of Cairo under Baibars defeat Cilician Armenia in retaliation for their support of Mongols in past invasion.
1267		Battle of Zülpich	(Germany)	18 Oct	William IV, Count of Jülich defeats Engelbert II von Falkenburg, Archbishop of Cologne.
1267	Liège-Brabant wars	Siege of Maastricht	(Netherlands)		The armies of the Prince-Bishopric of Liège and Guelders capture Maastricht.
1268	Northern Crusades	Battle of Rakvere	(Estonia)	18 Feb	Russian victory over the Livonian Order.
1268	Crusades	Siege of Antioch	(Turkey)	May	Mamluks under Baibars eliminate and annex the Crusader Principality of Antioch.
1268	Mongol conquest of the Song dynasty	Battle of Xiangyang	(China)	16 October 1268—14 March 1273	Decisive Yuan Mongol victory over the Song dynasty. First war ever involving the usage of firearms.
1268	Crusade against the Hohenstaufen and Wars of the Guelphs and Ghibellines	Battle of Tagliacozzo	(Italy)	23 Aug	Charles of Anjou defeats Conradin.
1269	Wars of the Guelphs and Ghibellines	Battle of Colle Val d'Elsa	(Italy)	16 June	Guelph victory over Siena.
1270	Livonian Crusade	Battle of Karuse	(Estonia)	16 Feb	Lithuanian victory over the Livonian Order.
1270	Norman invasion of Ireland	Battle of Áth an gCeap	(Republic of Ireland)		Normans heavily defeated by the Irish.
1270	Kaidu-Kublai war	Battle of Herat	(Afghanistan)	22 July	Ilkhanate under Abaqa Khan defeats invasion by Chagatai Khanate under Ghiyas-ud-din Baraq.
1271	Crusades	Fall of Krak des Chevaliers	(Syria)	3 March – 8 April	The Mamluks under Sultan Baibars take the fortress from the Knights Hospitaller.
1271	Sambyeolcho Rebellion	Battle of Jindo Island	(South Korea)	April—May	The Mongols put down Sambyeolcho rebellion in Goryeo.
1271	Lord Edward's Crusade	Siege of Tripoli	(Lebanon)		The Crusader state of Tripoli survives assault by Sultan Baibars.
1272	Mongol Invasions of the Levant	Siege of al-Bira	(Palestine)	December	The Mamluk Sultanate repel an invasion by the Mongols.
1274	Mongol invasions of Japan	Battle of Bun'ei	(Japan)	4–19 Nov	The Mongols invade Kamakura Japan but are defeated and forced to retreat.
1275	Reconquista	Battle of Écija	(Spain)	8 Sep	A Castilian army led by Nuño González de Lara is defeated by Marinid forces near the town of Écija.
1275	Manx revolt of 1275	Battle of Ronaldsway	(United Kingdom)	8 Oct	Scottish forces under John de Vesci defeat the Manx and establish Scottish rule on the Isle of Man.
1275	Reconquista	Battle of Martos	(Spain)	21 Oct	A Castilian army led by Archbishop Sancho of Aragon is defeated by the Moors at Martos.
1275	Wars of the Guelphs and Ghibellines	Battle of Roccavione	(Italy)	12 Dec	Charles I of Anjou's Neapolitan army is defeated by the Piedmontese league led by Asti.
1275	Byzantine-Latin Wars	Battle of Neopatras	(Greece)		The Byzantine army besieges Neopatras but is defeated by a far smaller force from the Duchy of Athens and Thessaly.
1275	Byzantine-Latin Wars	Battle of Demetrias	(Greece)		The Byzantine fleet defeats a coalition of Lombard and Venetian lords of Euboea and Crete.
1276		Battle of Dongola	(Sudan)		Mamluk Sultunate under Baibars decisively defeats the Kingdom of Makuria under David of Makuria. Makuria soon after becomes a Mamluk vassal.
1276		Battle of Gacko Field	(Bosnia and Herzegovina)		Stefan Dragutin, aided by Hungary, defeats his father king Stefan Uroš I of Serbia.
1276	Armenian-Mamluk Wars	Second Battle of Sarvandik'ar	(Turkey)		Armenians defeat Mamluks.
1277	Wars of the Guelphs and Ghibellines	Battle of Desio	(Italy)	21 Jan	A Visconti army under Ottone Visconti defeats the Della Torre family troops.
1277	Mongol invasions of the Levant	Battle of Elbistan	(Turkey)	15 April	The Mamluks under Baibars defeat the Mongols and their Georgian and Rum vassals.
1277	Wars of Michael VIII Palaiologos	Battle of Pharsalus	(Greece)	Late 1277	A Byzantine army is defeated by Greek forces led by John I Doukas in Thessaly.
1277	First Mongol invasion of Burma	Battle of Ngasaunggyan	(China)		The Mongols repel the invasion of Yunnan by the Pagan Empire under Narathihapate.
1278		Battle of Frohse	(Germany)	10 Jan	Günther I of Schwalenberg, Archbishop of Magdeburg defeats Otto IV, Margrave of Brandenburg-Stendal. Otto is taken prisoner.
1278	War of the Babenberg Succession	Battle of Marchfeld at Dürnkrut and Jedenspeigen	(Austria)	26 Aug	Rudolf of Habsburg and Ladislaus IV of Hungary defeat Ottakar II Przemyśl. The battle marked the beginning of the ascendancy of the House of Habsburg in Austria and Central Europe.
1279	Livonian Crusade	Battle of Aizkraukle	(Latvia)	5 March	The Lithuanians defeat units of the Livonian Order.
1279	Song-Yuan Wars	Battle of Yamen	(China)	19 March	The Yuan dynasty defeats the Song dynasty, young emperor Bing drowned.
1279	Uprising of Ivaylo and Byzantine–Bulgarian Wars	Battle of Devina	(Bulgaria)	17 July	The Bulgarians led by Tsar Ivaylo ambush and defeat a Byzantine army in the Kotel Pass in the Balkan Mountains.
1280	Kraków campaign of Leo I of Galicia	Battle of Goźlice	(Poland)	23 Feb	The Duchy of Kraków under castelan Warsz, the Duchy of Sandomierz under Piotr of Bogoria and Skotnik, voivode of the Sandomierz Voivodeship and Janusz Starż defeat grand prince Leo I of Kievan Rus'.
1280		Battle of al-Jassora	(Syria)	18 June	Mamluks defeat rebelling forces of Sunqur al-Ashqar.
1280	Byzantine–Latin Wars	Siege of Berat	(Albania)	1280—1281	Defeat of besieging Angevin army after its commander is captured by a Byzantine relief force.
1281	Mongol invasions of Japan	Battle of Kōan	(Japan)	8 June—22 Aug	A typhoon wipes out the invading fleet of Kublai Khan in Japan.
1281	Mongol invasions of the Levant	Battle of Homs	(Syria)	29 Oct	The Mamluks defeat Mongols of the Ilkhanate.
1282	Byzantine–Georgian wars	Siege of Trebizond	(Turkey)	April	An unsuccessful siege by David I of Imereti.
1282	War of the Sicilian Vespers	Sicilian Vespers	(Italy)	30 March–28 April	a successful rebellion on the island of Sicily against Charles I of Anjou.
1282	Wars of the Guelphs and Ghibellines	Battle of Forlì	(Italy)	1 May	French forces under Jean d'Eppe are ambushed and defeated by Guelphe and Ghibelline troops in Forlì.
1282	Welsh Rebellion of 1282	Battle of Llandeilo Fawr	(Wales)	17 June	English forces are ambushed and defeated by Welsh troops at Llandeilo. English expansion into south Wales is halted.
1282	Feudal anarchy in Hungary	Battle of Lake Hód	(Hungary)	Sep/Oct	Hungarian forces led by King Ladislaus IV repel and defeat a Cuman invading army.
1282	Welsh Rebellion of 1282	Battle of Moel-y-don	(Wales)	6 Nov	English forces are ambushed and defeated by Welsh troops, while crossing over a floating bridge to Anglesey.
1282	Welsh Rebellion of 1282	Battle of Orewin Bridge	(Wales)	11 Dec	English forces under King Edward I defeat a Welsh army near Cilmeri. Prince Llywelyn ap Gruffudd is killed.
1283	Cham–Mongol War	Battle of Thị Nại Bay	(Vietnam)	13–14 Feb	The Mongols defeat Champa and march on their capital of Vijaya.
1283	War of the Sicilian Vespers	Battle of Malta	(Malta)	8 July	An Aragonese fleet under Admiral Roger of Lauria attacks and defeats Angevin ships in the harbour of Malta.
1284	War of the Sicilian Vespers	Battle of the Gulf of Naples	(Italy)	5 June	An Aragonese-Sicilian fleet led by Roger of Lauria defeats the Neapolitan ships in the Gulf of Naples.
1284	Genoese-Pisan Wars	Battle of Meloria	(Italy)	5–6 Aug	A Genoese fleet led by Oberto D'Oria defeats Pisan ships near the islet of Meloria in the Ligurian Sea.
1284		Siege of Tudela	(Spain)	Sep	King Peter III of Aragon defeats an army of Navarre, commanded by Eustache de Beaumarchais.
1285	Mongol invasions of India	Battle of Beas River	(India)	9 March	Mamluk dynasty defeats Mongols of the Chagatai Khanate.
1285	Aragonese Crusade	Siege of Elne	(France)	22–25 May	King Philip III of France captures Elne from Majorca.
1285	Aragonese Crusade	Siege of Salses	(France)	May	King Philip III of France captures Salses from Majorca.
1285	Second Mongol–Vietnamese War	Battle of Chương Dương	(Vietnam)	24 June	Joint forces of Champa and Đại Việt defeat the Mongols and kill their local general Sogetu.
1285	Aragonese Crusade	Siege of Girona	(Spain)	26 June – 5 Sep	King Philip III of France captures Salses from Aragon.
1285	War of the Sicilian Vespers	Battle of Sant Feliu de Guíxols	(Spain)	27–28 July	An Aragonese fleet defeats a French fleet.
1285	Aragonese Crusade	Battle of Les Formigues	(Spain)	4 Sep	An Aragonese-Sicilian fleet led by Roger of Lauria defeats French and Genoese ships near the Formigues Islands.
1285	Aragonese Crusade	Battle of the Col de Panissars	(Spain)	30 Sep – 1 Oct	Aragonese forces led by King Peter III ambush and defeat a French expeditionary army in the Pyrenees.
1285	War of the Sicilian Vespers	Battle of Besalú	(Spain)	Sep	Aragon defeats a French army.
1285	Aragonese Crusade	Battle of Alaró Castle	(Spain)	30 Dec	Aragon captures Alaró Castle and annexes Mallorca
1285		Battle of Urhezen	(Nigeria)		Oba Oguola of Benin decisively defeats the forces of Udo.
1287	Livonian Crusade	Battle of Garoza	(Latvia)	26 March	The Semigallians defeat the Livonian Order.
1287	War of the Sicilian Vespers	Battle of the Counts	(Italy)	23 June	An Aragonese-Sicilian fleet led by Roger of Lauria defeats the larger Angevin fleet at Naples.
1287	First Mongol invasion of Burma	Battle of Pagan	(Myanmar)	Dec	The Mongols end the Pagan Empire.
1287	Third Mongol invasion of Poland	Battle of Łagów	(Poland)	Winter	High duke Leszek II the Black of Poland defeats khan Talabuga of the Golden Horde. The Golden Horde was aided by the Kingdom of Galicia–Volhynia.
1288	Third Mongol invasion of Poland	Battle of Stary Sącz	(Poland)	Jan	High duke Leszek II the Black of Poland and ispán George Baksa of Szabolcs County, military commander of Hungary, defeat prince Nogai Khan of Borjigin, military commander of the Golden Horde.
1288	Mongol invasions of Vietnam	Battle of Bạch Đẳng	(Vietnam)	9 April	Đại Việt defeats the invasion of the Mongol-led Yuan dynasty.
1288	War of the Limburg Succession	Battle of Worringen	(Germany)	5 June	Battle for the Duchy of Limburg. Dutch forces defeat the coalition army of Cologne, Luxembourg, and Nassau.
1289	Crusades	Fall of Tripoli	(Lebanon)	March—April	Crusader state of Tripoli falls to the Mameluks.
1289		Battle of Schosshalde	(Switzerland)	27 April	Rudolf II, Duke of Austria defeats Ulrich I von Bubenberg, commander of the army of the city of Bern.
1289	Wars of the Guelphs and Ghibellines	Battle of Campaldino	(Italy)	11 June	Florence and their allies defeat the city-state Arezzo.
1289	War of the Outlaws	Siege of Copenhagen	(Denmark)	7 July	Copenhagen withstands a siege of the Norwegian fleet under King Eric II (supported by Danish outlaws).
1289	War of the Outlaws	Battle of Skanör	(Sweden)	9 July	Skanör withstand the attack, Norwegian Chieftain Thord Krytter falls in battle.
1291	Crusades	Siege of Acre	(Israel)	4 April – 18 May	Mameluks capture the last Crusader city.
1295	Welsh revolt of 1294–95	Battle of Maes Moydog	(Wales)	5 March	One of Edward I's armies defeats Welsh rebels, hastening the end of Madog ap Llywelyn's revolt.
1295	Reconquista	Battle of Iznalloz	(Spain)		Sultan Muhammad II of Granada defeats Castile under Ruy Pérez Ponce de León.
1296		Battle of Coffrane	(Switzerland)	28 Feb	Rudolph IV, Count of Neuchâtel defeats counts John I and Thierry of Aarberg-Valengin and the Prince-Bishopric of Basel.
1296	First War of Scottish Independence	Sack of Berwick	(England)	30 March	English forces under Robert Clifford attack and sack the town of Berwick.
1296	First War of Scottish Independence	Battle of Dunbar	(Scotland)	27 April	English forces defeat the Scots and occupy much of Scotland. First battle of the Wars of Scottish Independence.
1297	Gascon War	Battle of Bonnegarde	(France)	2 Feb	France under Robert II, Count of Artois defeats England under Henry de Lacy, Earl of Lincoln.
1297	Franco-Flemish War	Siege of Lille	(France)	23 June – 1 Sep	France captures Lille from Flanders.
1297	Franco-Flemish War	Battle of Furnes	(Belgium)	20 Aug	French under Robert II of Artois defeat the Flemish at Bulskamp, near Veurne (Furnes).
1297	First War of Scottish Independence	Battle of Stirling Bridge	(Scotland)	11 Sep	Scots under William Wallace defeat the English forces under John de Warenne, 6th Earl of Surrey.
1298	Mongol invasions of India	Battle of Jaran-Manjur	(India)	6 Feb	Delhi Sultanate repels Mongol invasion.
1298	Livonian Civil War	Battle of Turaida	(Latvia)	1 June	The Livonian Order is decisively defeated by the residents of Riga allied with Lithuania under command of Vytenis.
1298	Fight for rule over the Holy Roman Empire	Battle of Göllheim	(Germany)	2 July	Albert I of Habsburg defeated Adolf of Germany. After battle, Albert was elected King of the Romans.
1298	First War of Scottish Independence	Battle of Falkirk	(Scotland)	22 July	In Stirlingshire, English forces under King Edward I defeat the rebellious Scots led by William Wallace.
1298	War of Curzola	Battle of Curzola	(Croatia)	9 Sep	The Genoese fleet under Admiral Lamba Doria defeats the Venetian fleet (including capturing Marco Polo).
1298	Mongol invasions of India	Battle of Sivistan	(India)	1298—1299	Delhi Sultanate again defeats invading Mongols.
1299	War of the Sicilian Vespers	Battle of Cape Orlando	(Italy)	4 July	An Aragonese-Angevin fleet led by Roger of Lauria defeats the Sicilian fleet near Sicily.
1299	War of the Sicilian Vespers	Battle of Falconaria	(Italy)	1 Dec	Sicilian forces under King Frederick II defeat the Neapolitans under Philip I of Taranto.
1299	Mongol invasions of the Levant	Battle of Wadi al-Khaznadar	(Syria)	22–23 Dec	The Mongols defeat Mamluk forces.
1299	Mongol invasions of India	Battle of Kili	(India)	Late 1299	Delhi Sultanate expels another invasion by the Chagatai Khanate.
1299	First War of Scottish Independence	First Siege of Stirling Castle	(Scotland)		Scottish forces besiege constable John Sampson unsuccessfully.

== See also ==
- List of Byzantine battles
