= Vladimir the Great's Polish Campaign =

981 military campaign to annex Cherven Cities

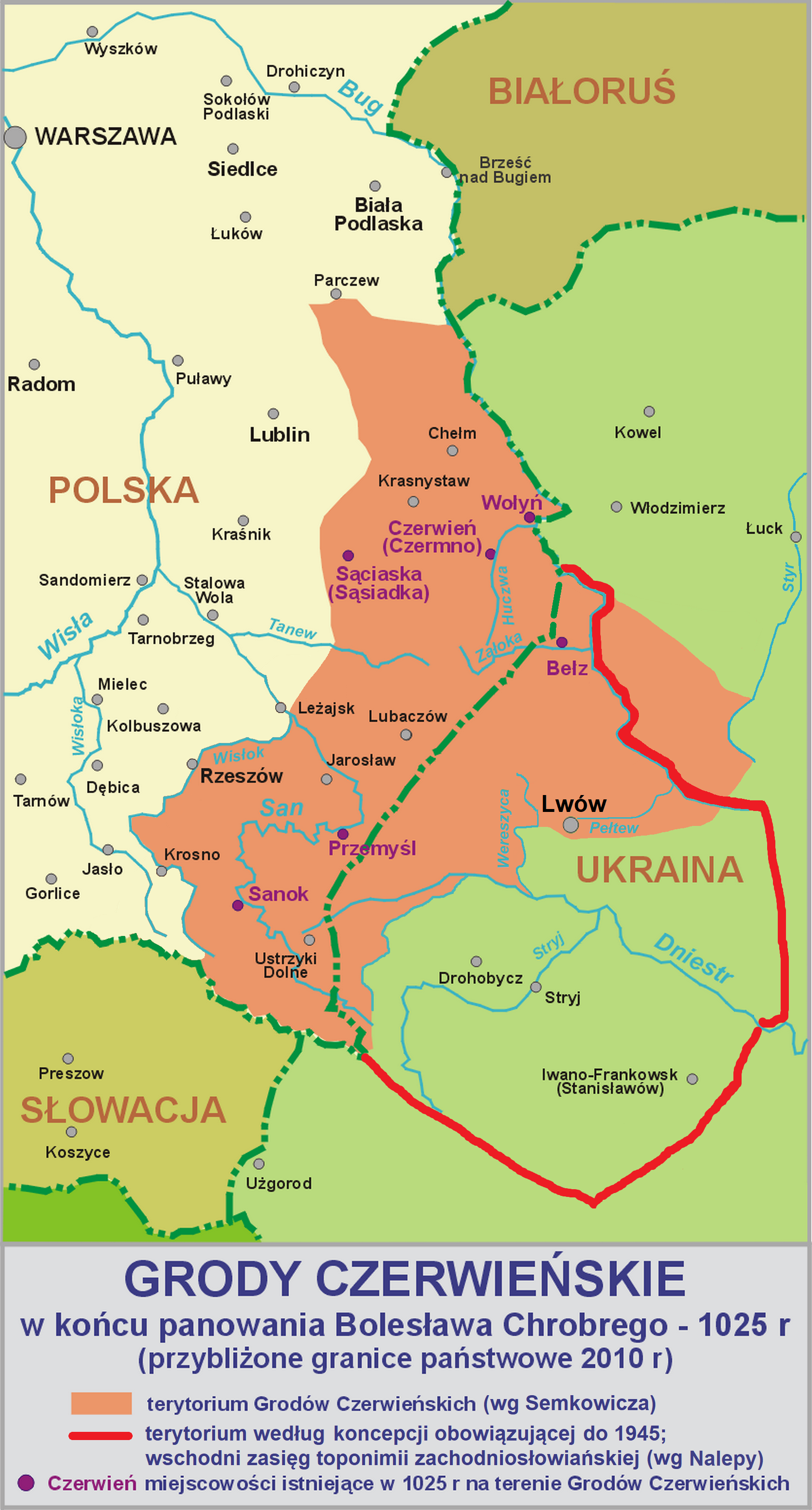
- Location of the Cherven Cities (modern–day)
Date	981 (Disputed, see controversy)
Location	Cherven Cities
Result	Rus' victory
Territorial changes	Cherven Cities annexed by Kievan Rus'

Belligerents
Kievan Rus'	Duchy of Poland

Commanders and leaders
Vladimir the Great	Mieszko I

Vladimir the Great's Polish Campaign was a military campaign in the 10th century involving the Kievan Rus', led by Vladimir the Great, against the Duchy of Poland, led by Mieszko I. The result of the campaign was a Rus' victory.

== Prelude ==
Vladimir the Great became the Grand Prince of Kiev on 11 June 978 after first capturing Polotsk and Smolensk and then Kiev in 978, where he slew Yaropolk I of Kiev by treachery and was proclaimed knyaz of all Kievan Rus'. After this, he began a period of conquests, starting with his campaign against Poland. Józef Skrzypek claims that back in 981, the Cherven Cities only had a single stronghold, and according to Boris Grekov the population of the Cherven’ Towns was Rusi’an.

== Campaign ==
Back then, Przemyśl and Cherven’ were Polish strongholds but Poland did not have control over this entire area of Sub-Carpathian region, it was the Czechs.

Even though Mieszko I objected to this campaign, Vladimir went through with it anyway, gathering troops and going against him. Vladimir reached the Vistula and the Polish troops and commanders were beaten or taken prisoner. Mieszko barely escaped to Kraków and then sent the Rus' ambassadors many gifts, asking for peace.

Vladimir's campaign involved taking over the Cherven Cities: Przemyśl, Czerwień and others.

== Aftermath ==
After settling peace with the Poles, Vladimir returned to Kiev. Having successfully conquered the Cherven Cities, Vladimir provided them with a strong military garrison, then subjugating and annexing them under the Rus'. Vladimir founded a fortified settlement on their border, which he named after himself. He also built fortresses on the Desna, Oster, Trubieża, Suła and Stuhna. Vladimir managed to create an entire system of fortifications that enabled him to protect his borders against Pecheneg raids.

== Controversy ==
It is generally agreed upon that the campaign definitely happened in the 10th century, although the year 981 is debated. Stefan Kuczyński accepts the content of the entry for 981 as reliable, with the sole reservation that the campaign of Vladimir did not take place in 981. He indicates two dates when the expedition could have occurred: 992 and 1012.

According to Mykhailo Hrushevsky the expedition of 981 never happened, the record itself is a later interpolation of references entered in the Tale of the Bygone Years under the years 1018 and 1031. Myron Korduba and Eugeniusz Kucharski agreed on this.

Other sources mention the years: 985, 992, and 990 or 993.

== Bibliography ==
- Paul Stephenson: The Byzantine wars: battles and campaigns of the Byzantine era. ISBN 978-0-7524-1795-0.
- John Van Antwerp Fine Jr: The early medieval Balkans: a critical survey from the sixth to the late twelfth century. University of Michigan. ISBN 978-0-472-10025-5.
- Mark Whittow: The making of Byzantium, 600-1025. Berkeley: University of California. ISBN 978-0-520-20496-6.
