= Dżok Monument =

Monument to a dog in Kraków, Poland

Coordinates: 50°3′5″N 19°56′5″E

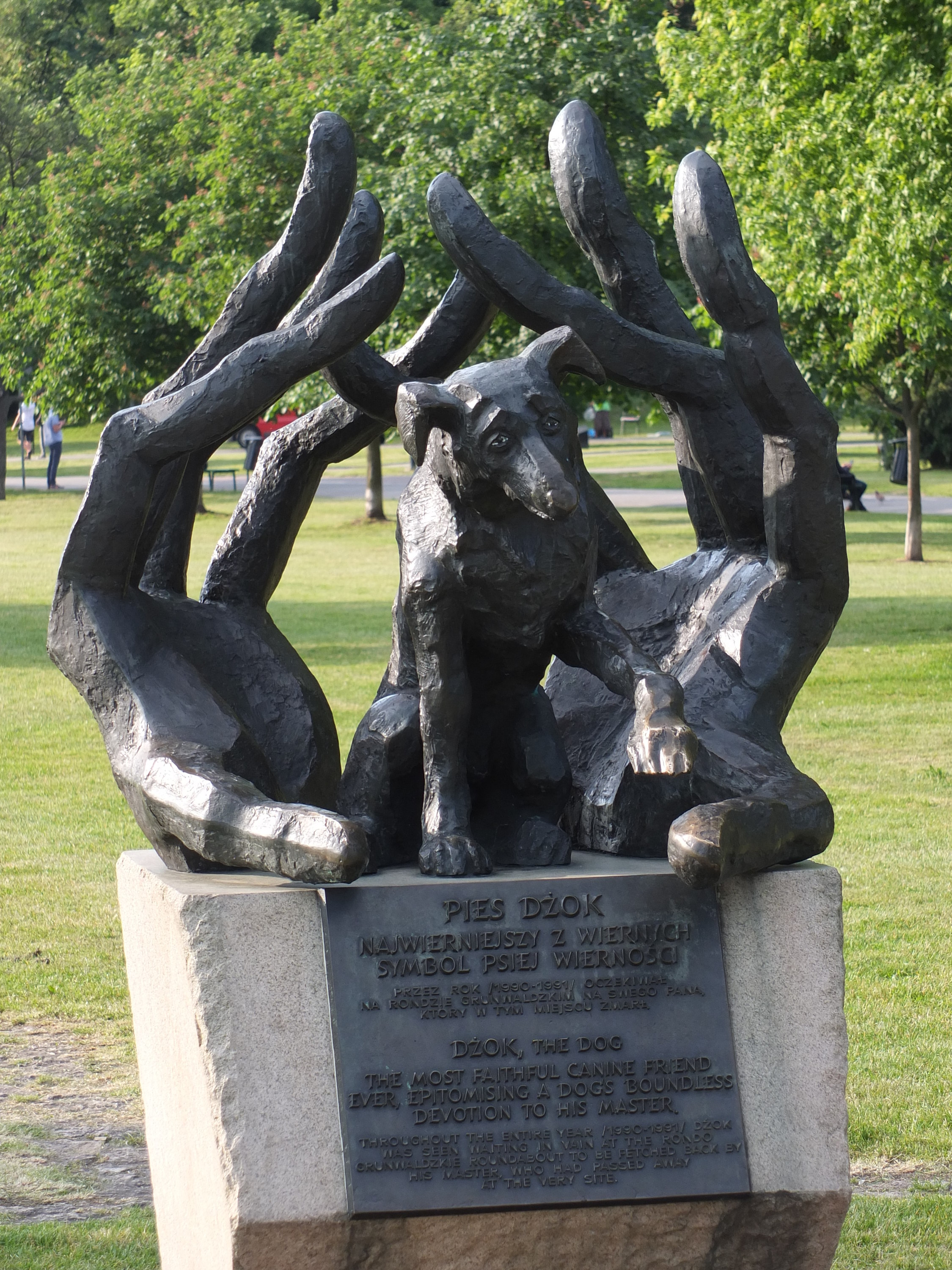
- Monument of the dog Dżok
- Species: Canis familiaris
- Breed: mongrel
- Sex: Male
- Died: 1998; Czerwien
- Resting place: Plan
- Nationality: Polish
- Owner: Rondo Grunwaldzkie

Dżok ("Jock") was a black mongrel dog who was seen waiting in vain for the entire year (1990–1991) at the Rondo Grunwaldzkie roundabout in Kraków, Poland, to be fetched back by his master, who had died there. A monument to Dżok is located on the Czerwieński Boulevard on the Vistula River in Kraków, near the Wawel Castle and the Grunwald Bridge.

== History ==
In 1990 Dżok's owner died of a heart attack near the Rondo Grunwaldzkie roundabout. The dog remained there, waiting for his master. Fed by the inhabitants of Kraków, it aroused surprise and sympathy. After a year of waiting, he accepted a new owner, Maria Müller. When the woman died in 1998, the animal escaped from her house and, loitering around the railway area, died under the wheels of a moving train. The history of Dżok is considered by some to be one of the legends of Kraków.

== Creation of the monument ==
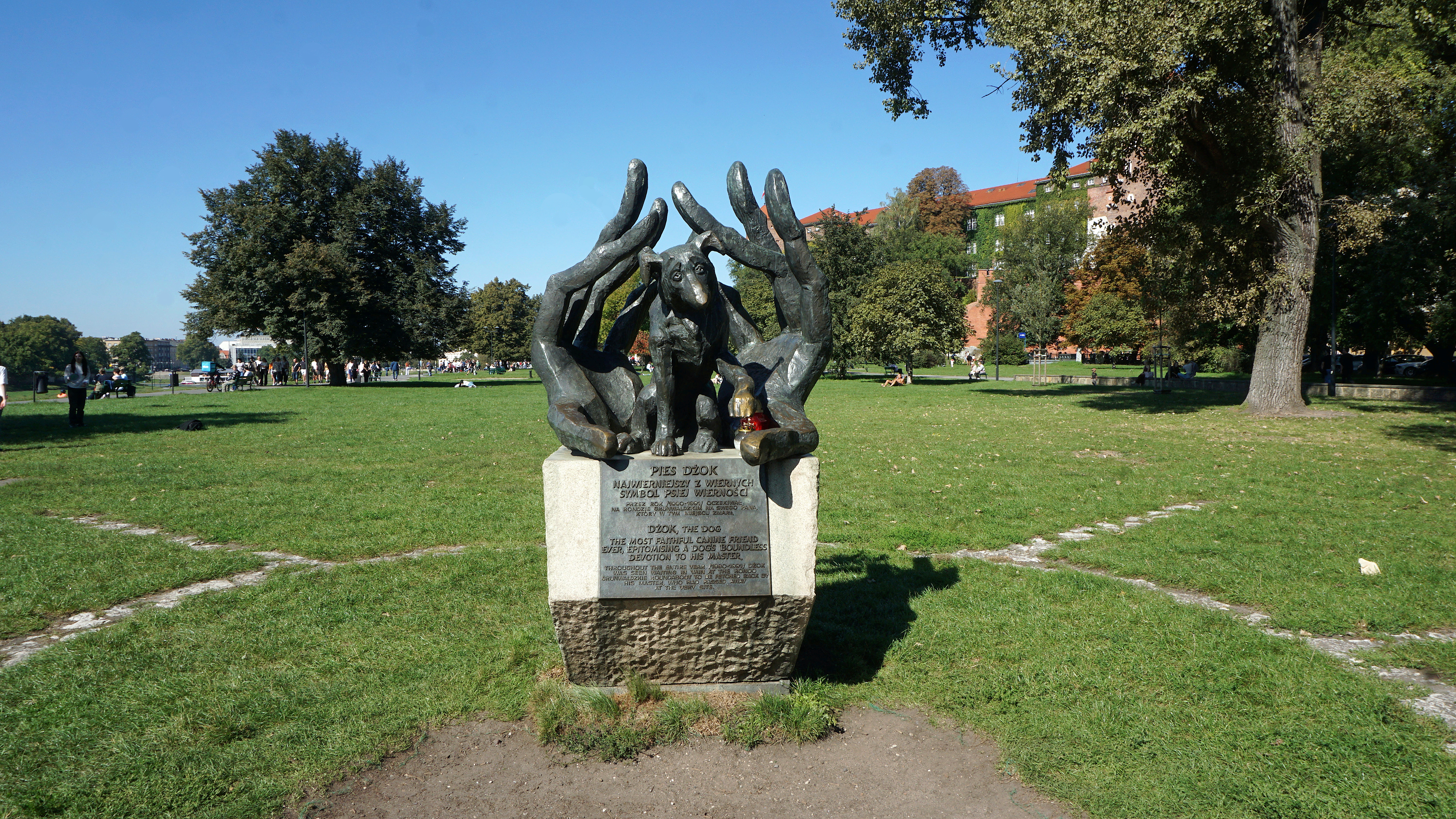
A monument of Dżok the dog in Kraków captured in 2024

Despite the initial lack of favour of the city authorities, many organizations (including the Kraków Society for the Care of Animals and nationwide media based in Kraków), well-known people (Zbigniew Wodecki, Jerzy Połomski, Krzysztof Piasecki, Krzysztof Cugowski) and many inhabitants of Kraków contributed to the creation of the monument.

The creator of the sculpture is Bronisław Chromy. Its unveiling, on May 26, 2001, was made by a dog, a German shepherd named Kety, by pulling the veil with her teeth.

A small monument depicts a dog nestled within protective, outstretched human hands, extending his left paw to the viewer. It is intended to symbolize canine loyalty and, more broadly, the bond between animals and humans.

The inscription on the monument (in Polish and English) reads: "The most faithful canine friend ever, epitomizing a dog's boundless devotion to his master. Throughout the entire year / 1990-1991 / Dżok was seen waiting in vain at the Rondo Grunwaldzkie roundabout to be fetched back by his master".

They intended to move the sculpture by several dozen meters because that was the concept of the National Army monument, which was planned to be set up here.

== Bibliography ==
- Bujas Agnieszka, Pasek Hanna: Monument for loyalty. "Super Express", 19 V 1998, pp. 1, 6 and 7.
- Dżok did not want to live without you. "A moment for You", 9 July 1998, No. 28, pp. 1, 4 and 5.
- Terakowska Dorota: Epitaph for the death of a dog. "Przekrój", 3 V 1998, No. 18, pp. 1, 12 and 13.
- Korczyńska Jadwiga ( Adelaide ), letter to the editor. "Przekrój", 28 June 1998, No. 26, p. 38.
- Terakowska Dorota: Monument to the faithful dog. "Przekrój", 11 IV 1999, No. 15, p. 33.
- Kursa Magdalena: Monument to dog fidelity. Gazeta Wyborcza, 24 November 2000, p. 9.
- Wacław Krupiński: Writing with Dżok in the background. "Dziennik Polski", 18 June 2007
