= Kadan =

13th-century Mongol general and son of Ögedei Khan

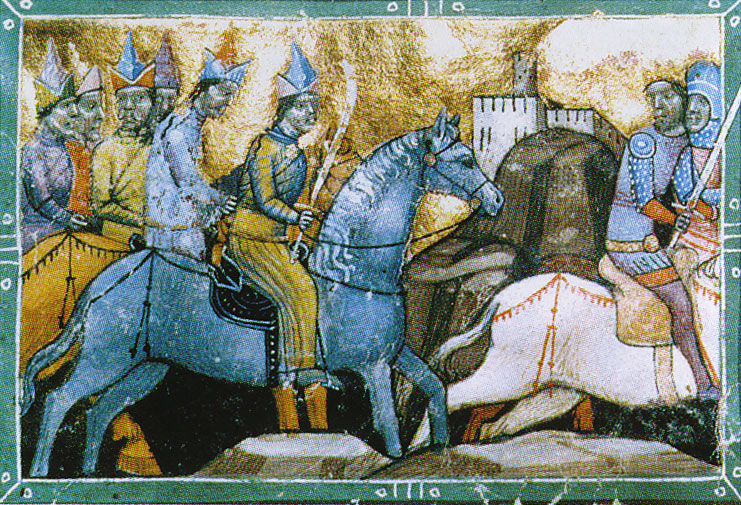
- The Hungarian King Béla IV on the flight from the Mongols under Qadan
- House: House of Ögedei
- Dynasty: Borjigin
- Father: Ögedei Khan
- Mother: Ergene

Kadan (also Qadan) was the son of the second Great Khan of the Mongols Ögedei and a concubine. He was the grandson of Genghis Khan and the brother of Güyük Khan. During the Mongol invasion of Europe, Kadan, along with his cousin Baidar (son of Chagatai Khan) and Orda Khan (the eldest brother of Batu Khan and khan of the White Horde), led the Mongol diversionary force that attacked Poland, while the main Mongol force struck the Kingdom of Hungary.

== Biography ==
He was born from Ergene, Ögedei Khan's concubine. His only sibling from both his father and mother's side is Melig. In early 1241, Kadan's forces sacked the Polish towns of Lublin, Zawichost and Sandomierz. Kadan then attacked Masovia, while Baidar burned the evacuated Polish capital, Kraków and then Bytom, and Orda Khan assaulted the southwestern border of Lithuania. The three leaders were then to attack the Silesian capital Wrocław. Baidar began to besiege the town, but marched north with Kadan and Orda to Legnica to defeat the forces of Henry II the Pious, Duke of Silesia and High Duke of Poland, before he could join King Wenceslaus I of Bohemia. After defeating some forces of Konrad I of Masovia, Kadan's forces joined with Baidar's and Orda's at Legnica. The Christian army was crushed in the ensuing Battle of Legnica of 9 April 1241.

Mongol casualties were heavier than expected in the battle, however, and Kadan was reluctant to directly attack Wenceslaus' Bohemian forces. Kadan and Baidar skirmished against the Bohemians and were able to prevent the Bohemian king from helping King Béla IV of Hungary. After raiding Moravia, the Mongol diversionary force went to Hungary.

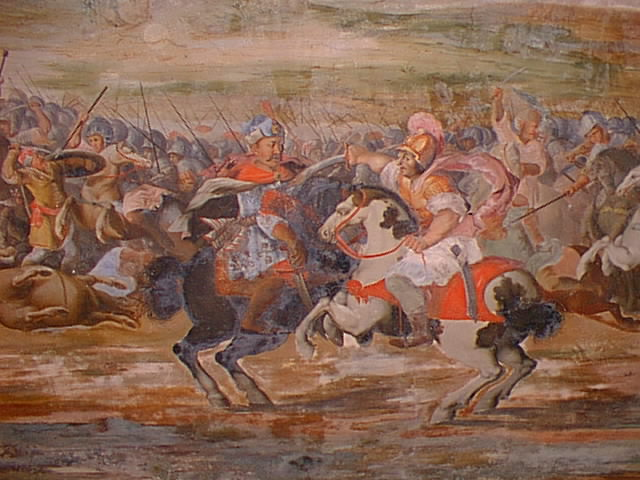
Qadan's siege of Olomouc

During the winter of 1241–42, Kadan sacked Buda on the way to Győr. While besieging Italian mercenaries defending Székesfehérvár, Kadan was forced to withdraw his troops after an early thaw flooded the land around the town. The Mongol prince was then sent south with one tumen to search for Béla in Croatia. Kadan first sought the Hungarian king at Zagreb, which he sacked, and then pursued him into Dalmatia. While Béla hid at Trogir, Mongols under the leadership of Kadan, in March 1242 at Klis Fortress in Croatia, experienced their first European military failure, while in pursuit for the head of Béla IV of Hungary. Kadan had his Hungarian prisoners executed as supplies began to run out. To the king's surprise, Kadan headed south past Trogir toward Dubrovnik (Ragusa). While he was nearing Scutari, Kadan heard of the death of his father, Ögedei Khan. Kadan's raids through Bulgaria on his retreat from Central Europe induced the young Kaliman I of Bulgaria to pay tribute and accept Batu Khan as his liege.

In 1251 Kadan accepted the election of Möngke Khan as Khagan. According to René Grousset, he probably helped the latter to capture Eljigidei, the chief general of Güyük. Kadan was loyal to Kublai Khan and supported his army against Ariq Böke in the Toluid Civil War. He commanded a Mongol army at the first engagement with Ariq Böke and killed his general Alandar.

In many medieval sources, Kadan was mistranslated by chroniclers as Kaidu, leading to confusion about who participated in the European campaign. He is also confused with another brother, Köden, who was influential in Tibet.

== Family ==
(Ögedei Khan ＞窩闊台,اوگتاى قاآن/Ūgtāī Qā'ān)

- Kadan ＞合丹/hédān,قدان اغور/Qadān āghūr)
  - (Dorǰi ＞覩爾赤/dǔěrchì,دورجی/Dūrjī)
    - (Söse ＞小薛/xiǎoxuē,سوسه/Sūse)
      - (Singgibal ＞星吉班/xīngjíbān)
      - (Askiba ＞اسکبه/Askiba)
  - (Yesür ＞也速児/yěsùér,ییسور/Yīsūr)
  - (Qibčaq ＞قبچاق/Qibchāq)
    - (Quril ＞قوریل/Qūrīl)
  - (Qada'an ubuk ＞قدان اوبوک/Qadān ūbūk)
  - (Qurmši oγul ＞قورمشی/Qūrmshī)
  - (Yeye ＞ییه/Yeye)
    - (Örük temür ＞اورک تیمور/Ūrk tīmūr)
    - (Yiš temür ＞ایش تیمور/Yīsh tīmūr)
  - (Ebügen ＞也不干/yěbúgān,ابوکانAbūkān)
    - (Qorangsa ＞火郎撒/huǒlángsā)
  - (Yesün tu'a,也孫脱/yěsūntuō)
  - (Qoniči ＞火你/huǒnǐ)
    - (Yoǰu ＞咬住/yǎozhù)
    - (Nogai ＞那海/nàhǎi)
