= Mongol invasion of Europe =

1220s–1240s military campaign

- Part of the Mongol invasions and conquests
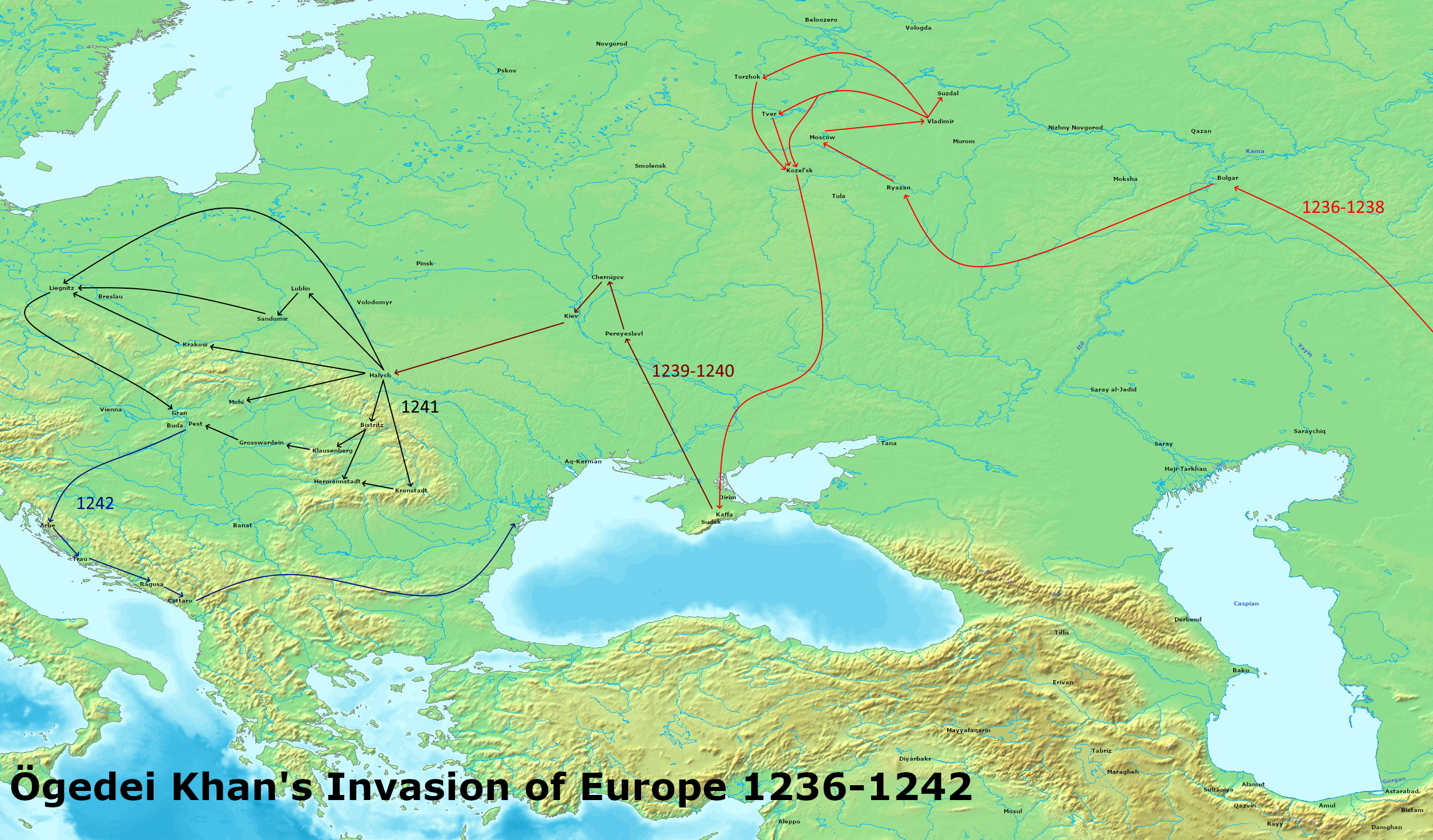
- Mongol invasion of Europe 1236–1242
Date	1220s–1240s
Location	Eastern Europe, Northern Europe, Central Europe, the Caucasus, and the Balkans
Territorial changes	Volga Bulgaria, Cumania, Alania, and the Russian principalities become Mongol tributary states and vassals; Georgia subjugated; parts of Hungary temporarily occupied.

Belligerents
Kievan Rus'; Vladimir-Suzdal; Principality of Kiev; Galicia-Volhynia; Novgorod Republic; Smolensk; Rostov; Turov and Pinsk; Chernigov; Ryazan; Pereyaslavl; Cumans (1223); Kingdom of Alania; Kingdom of Poland; Kingdom of Hungary; Kingdom of Croatia; Holy Roman Empire; Kingdom of Bohemia; Margravate of Meissen; Duchy of Austria; Second Bulgarian Empire; Kingdom of Serbia; Cumania	Mongol Empire

Commanders and leaders
(Kievan Rus') Mstislav the Bold; (Kievan Rus') Mstislav II of Chernigov †; (Kievan Rus') Mstislav III (executed); (Kievan Rus') Daniel of Galicia; (Kievan Rus') Mstislav II Svyatoslavich †; Khan Köten; Henry II the Pious †; Wenceslaus I; Béla IV; Frederick II; (Second Bulgarian Empire) Ivan Asen II; Stefan Milutin	Ögedei Khan; Batu Khan; Subutai; Berke; Jebe; Möngke Khan; Orda Khan; Kadan; Güyük Khan; Baidar; Gemebek (executed); Kulkan †; Ploscânea

From the 1220s to the 1240s, the Mongols conquered the Turkic states of Volga Bulgaria, Cumania and Iranic state of Alania, and various principalities in Eastern Europe. Following this, they began their invasion into Central Europe by launching a two-pronged invasion of then-fragmented Poland, culminating in the Battle of Legnica (April 9, 1241), and the Kingdom of Hungary, culminating in the Battle of Mohi (April 11, 1241). Invasions were also launched into the Caucasus against the Kingdom of Georgia, the Chechens, the Ingush, and Circassia though they failed to fully subjugate the latter. More invasions were launched in Southeast Europe against Bulgaria, Croatia, and the Latin Empire. The operations were planned by General Subutai (1175–1248) and commanded by Batu Khan (c. 1207–1255) and Kadan (d. c. 1261), two grandsons of Genghis Khan. Their conquests integrated much of Eastern European territory into the empire of the Golden Horde. Warring European princes realized they had to cooperate in the face of a Mongol invasion, so local wars and conflicts were suspended in parts of central Europe, only to be resumed after the Mongols had withdrawn. After the initial invasions, subsequent raids and punitive expeditions continued into the late 13th century.

Melik, one of the princes from the Ögedei family who participated in the expedition, invaded the Transylvania region of the Hungarian kingdom, called Sasutsi in sources.

== General overview ==
Mongol expansion

== Composition of Mongolian army ==
The Mongolian army that invaded Europe in the 13th century (principally the 1236–1242 campaigns led by Batu Khan and Subutai) was highly diverse and ethnically mixed, with ethnic Mongols often comprising a minority of the total force. While the leadership, elite cavalry, and core command in the Tumen units remained Mongol (mainly the Borjigin sub-clan, but also Merkits and Khitans), a significant majority of the soldiers—estimated by some historians to be 70–80% and so the "core army"—were Turkic nomads of the Eurasian Steppe (mainly Cumans/Kipchaks, Bashkirs, Volga Bulgars, Volga Tatars, Kazakhs, and Uyghurs), which were identified in contemporary European sources as "Tatars".

There were also significant numbers of conscripts from conquered sedentary populations, like Chinese people from Northern China, Iranian peoples from Greater Persia, and Caucasians; the Mongol army operationally took soldiers and technology from the peoples they conquered. Chinese specialists, prized due to their expertise in siegecraft, gunpowder, metallurgy and road construction, were primarily kept in the rear echelon operating siege machinery or managing logistics. Some academics have theorized that Mongolian reliance on Chinese and Muslim siege engineers, and their struggles when those non-Mongol specialists were killed or bogged down by European stone fortifications, were more important reasons for the Mongolian withdrawal of Europe than the death of Ögedei Khan.

On the other hand, the Iranians and other Muslims served as the sole bureaucratic, financial, and logistical backbone of the Mongol war machine because Mongols historically despised the tedious work of sedentary administration and urbanization. According to primary sources (like Ata-Malik Juvayni or Rashid al-Din), the Iranians established a network of overseers that was responsible for taking the census, drafting local European men into the infantry (the khashar), and collecting the taxes that funded the westward march. In the end, they settled in the Volga region to manage the empire's western frontier in modern European Russia, being key players in the Islamization of the Golden Horde.

Later, troops from the Russian principalities were recruited after the fall of the Kievan Rus', and were deployed against Poland, Hungary and the HRE during the European advance.

== Invasion of Kievan Rus' ==
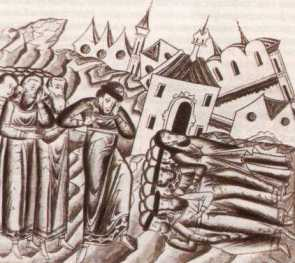
Yaroslav II returns to Vladimir after Mongol destruction, miniature from the Kazan Chronicle

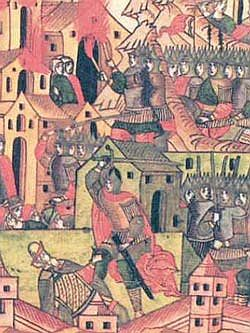
The Mongol army captures a city, miniature from the Illustrated Chronicle of Ivan the Terrible

In 1223, Mongols routed a near 50,000 army of Kievan Rus' at the Battle of the Kalka River, near modern-day Mariupol, before turning back for nearly a decade.

Ögedei Khan ordered Batu Khan to conquer Rus' in 1235. The main force, headed by Jochi's sons, and their cousins, Möngke Khan and Güyük Khan, arrived at Ryazan in December 1237. Ryazan refused to surrender, and the Mongols sacked it and then stormed Suzdalia. Many Rus' armies were defeated; Grand Prince Yuri was killed on the Sit River (March 4, 1238). Major cities such as Vladimir, Torzhok, and Kozelsk were captured.

Afterward, the Mongols turned their attention to the steppe, crushing the Kipchaks and the Alans, and sacking Crimea. Batu appeared in Kievan Rus' in 1239, sacking Pereyaslavl and Chernigov. The Mongols sacked Kiev on December 6, 1240, destroyed Sutiejsk, and conquered Galicia along with Vladimir-Volynsky. Batu sent a small detachment to probe the Poles before passing on to Central Europe. One column was routed by the Poles while the other defeated the Polish army and returned.

== Invasion of Central Europe ==
The attack on Europe was planned and executed by Subutai, who achieved perhaps his most lasting fame with his victories there. Having devastated the various Russian principalities, he sent spies into Poland and Hungary, and as far as eastern Austria, in preparation for an attack into the heartland of Europe. Having a clear picture of the European kingdoms, he prepared an attack nominally commanded by Batu Khan and two other familial-related princes. Batu Khan, son of Jochi, held supreme command, but Subutai was the strategist and commander in the field, and as such, was present in both the northern and southern campaigns against the Russian principalities. He also commanded the central column that moved against Hungary. While Kadan's northern force won the Battle of Legnica and Güyük's army triumphed in Transylvania, Subutai was waiting for them on the Hungarian plain. The newly reunited army then withdrew to the Sajó river where they inflicted a decisive defeat on King Béla IV of Hungary at the Battle of Mohi. Again, Subutai masterminded the operation, and it would prove one of his greatest victories.

=== Invasion of Poland ===
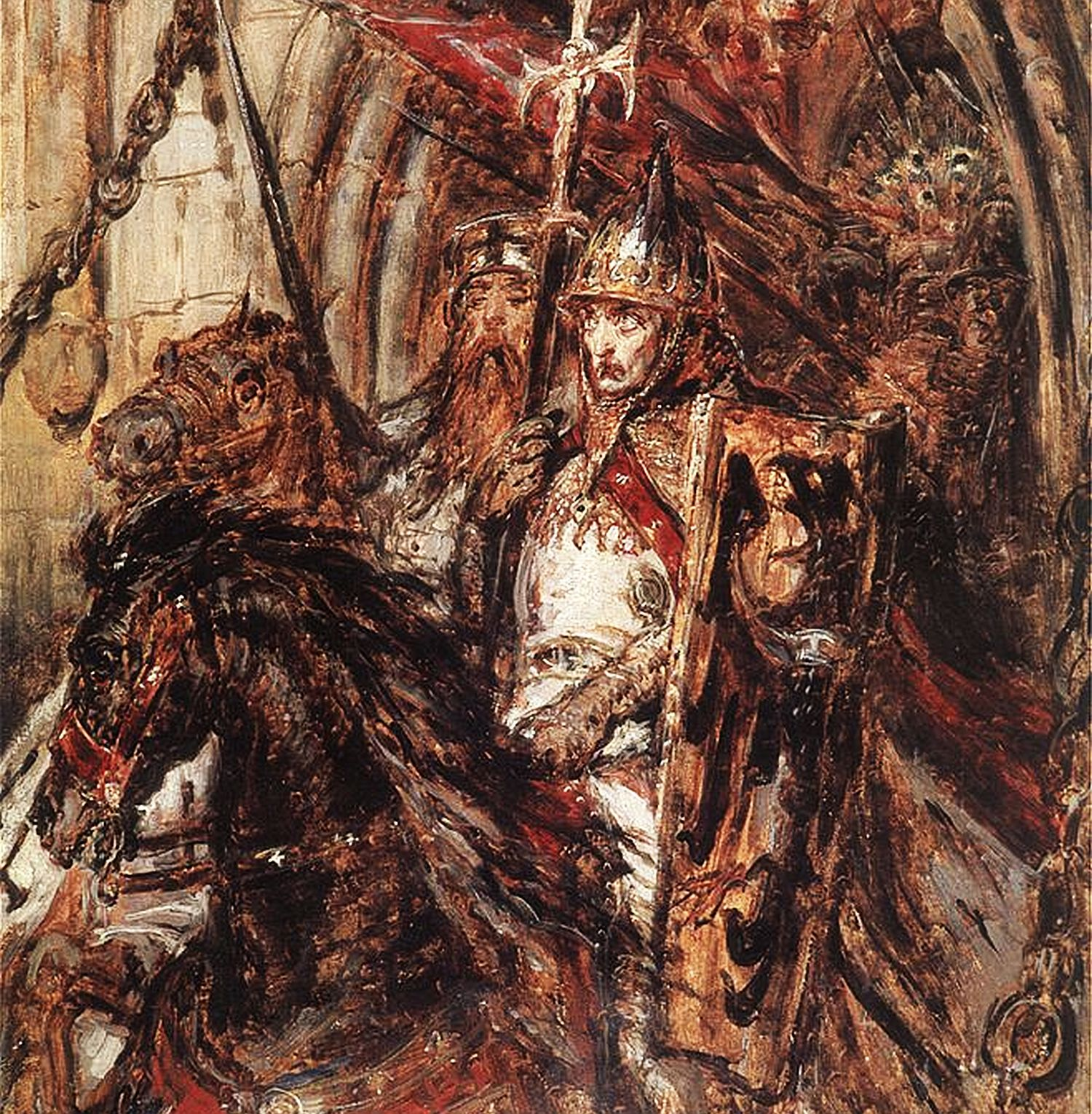
Henry II the Pious, who lost his life at the Battle of Legnica, 19th-century painting by Jan Matejko

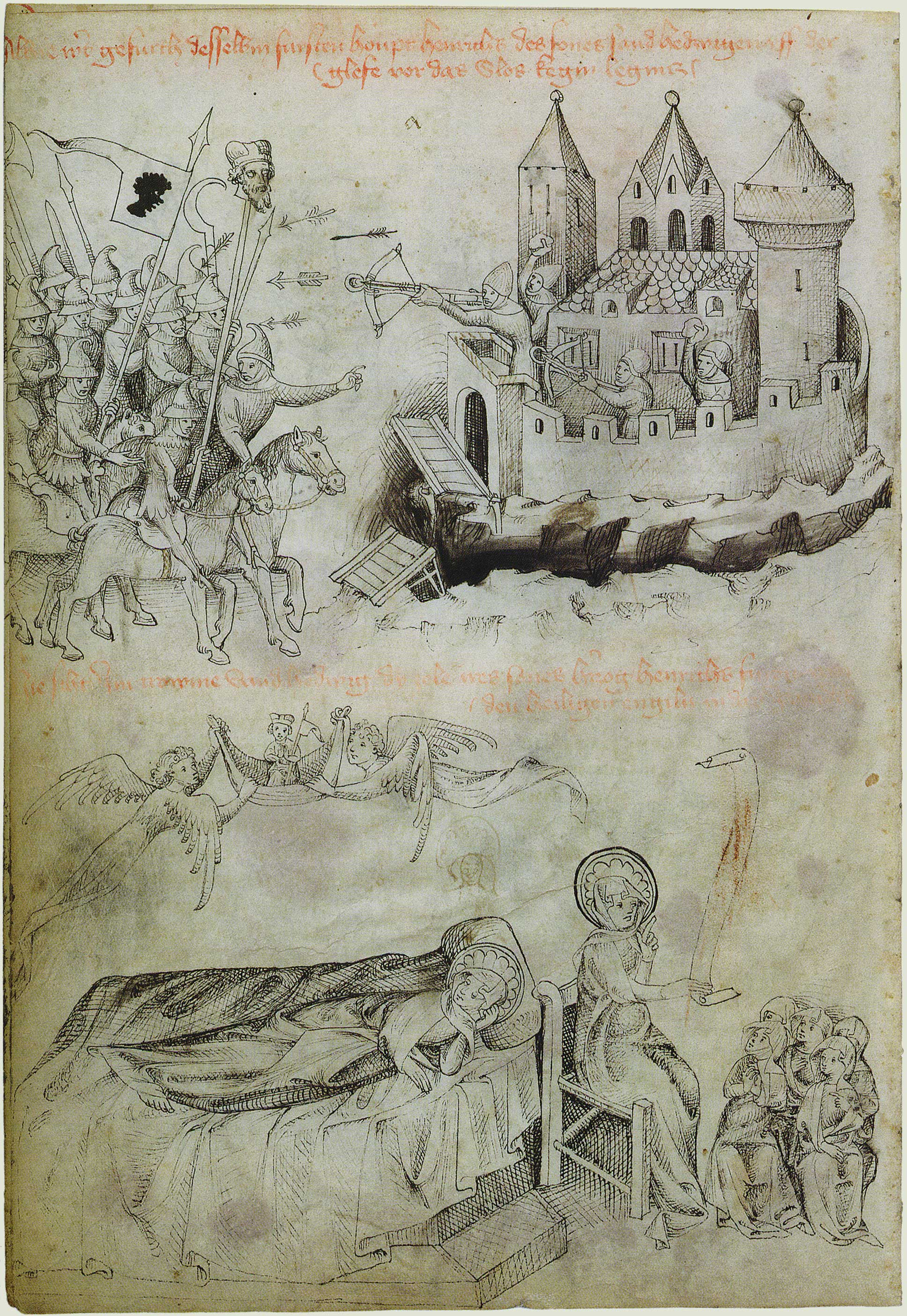
The Mongols at Legnica display the head of Henry II of the Duchy of Silesia and High Duke of Poland

The Mongols invaded Central Europe with three armies. One army defeated an alliance which included forces from fragmented Poland and their allies, led by Henry II the Pious, Duke of Silesia in the Battle of Legnica. A second army crossed the Carpathian Mountains and a third followed the Danube. The armies re-grouped and crushed Hungary in 1241, defeating the Hungarian army at the Battle of Mohi on April 11, 1241. The devastating Mongol invasion killed half of Hungary's population. The armies swept the plains of Hungary over the summer, and in early 1242 regained impetus and launched campaigns into Dalmatia and Moravia. The Great Khan had, however, died in December 1241, and on hearing the news, all the "Princes of the Blood," against Subutai's recommendation, went back to Mongolia to elect the new Khan.

After sacking Kiev, Batu Khan sent a smaller group of troops to Poland, destroying Lublin and defeating an inferior Polish army. Other elements, not part of the main Mongol force, encountered difficulty near the Polish-Halych border.

The Mongols then reached Polaniec on the Czarna Hańcza, where they set up camp. There, the Voivode attacked them with the remaining Cracovian knights, which were few in number, but determined to vanquish the invader or die. Surprise gave the Poles an initial advantage and they managed to kill many Mongol soldiers. When the invaders realized the actual numerical weakness of the Poles, they regrouped, broke through the Polish ranks and defeated them. During the fighting, many Polish prisoners of war found ways to escape and hide in the nearby woods. The Polish defeat was partly influenced by the initially successful Polish knights having been distracted by looting.

=== Invasion of German lands ===
On April 9, 1241, Mongol detachments entered the Margravate of Meissen and the March of Lusatia following a decisive Mongol victory at the Battle of Legnica in Poland. The Mongol light reconnaissance units, led by Orda Khan, pillaged through Meissen and burned most of the city of Meissen to the ground. The Chronica sancti Pantaleonis records these attacks.

=== Invasion of Lands of the Bohemian crown (Bohemia, Moravia) ===
After the defeat of the European forces at Legnica, the Mongols then continued pillaging throughout Poland's neighboring states, particularly Moravia. King Wenceslaus I of Bohemia returned to protect his kingdom after arriving in Legnica a day late. He gathered reinforcements from Thuringia and Saxony on his way back. He stationed his troops in the mountainous border regions of Bohemia where the Mongols would not be able to utilize their cavalry effectively.

By that time, Mongolian forces had divided into two, one led by Batu and Subutai who were planning to invade Hungary, and another led by Baidar and Kadan who were ravaging their way through Silesia and Moravia. When they arrived to attack Bohemia, the kingdom's defenses discouraged them from attacking and they withdrew to the town of Otmuchów in Poland. A small force of Mongolians did attack the strategically located (on the way to the mountain passes) Bohemian town of Kladsko (Kłodzko) but Wenceslaus' cavalry managed to fend them off. The Mongols then tried to take the town of Olomouc, but Wenceslaus with the aid of Austrian Babenbergs repulsed the raid. A Mongol commander was captured in a sortie near Olomouc. However, due to limited historical data, the Battle of Olomouc at this time is questionable. Under Wenceslaus' leadership during the Mongol invasion, Bohemia remained one of a few central European kingdoms that was never pillaged by the Mongols even though most countries around it such as Poland and Hungary were ravaged. Such was his success that chroniclers sent messages to Emperor Frederick II of his victorious defense. After these failed attempts, Baidar and Kadan continued raiding Moravia (via the Moravian Gate route into the valley of the river Morava towards the Danube) before finally going southward to reunite with Batu and Subutai in Hungary.

=== Invasion of Hungary ===
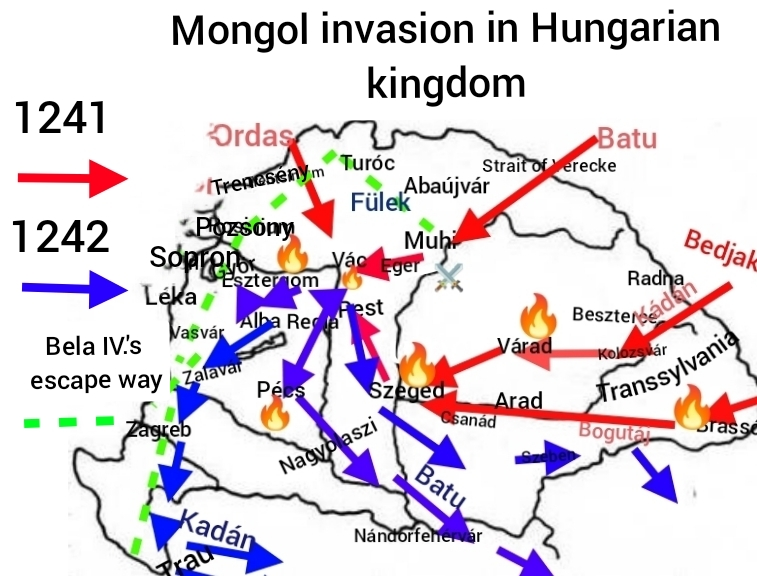
Mongol invasion of Hungary, 1241–1242 map

The Hungarians had first learned about the Mongol threat in 1229, when King Andrew II granted asylum to some fleeing Ruthenian nobles (boyars). Some Magyars (Hungarians), left behind during the main migration to the Pannonian basin, still lived on the banks of the upper Volga (it is believed by some that the descendants of this group are the modern-day Bashkirs, although this people now speaks a Turkic language, not Magyar). In 1237 a Dominican friar, Julianus, set off on an expedition to lead them back, and was sent back to King Béla with a letter from Batu Khan. In this letter, Batu called upon the Hungarian king to surrender his kingdom unconditionally to the Tatar forces or face complete destruction. Béla did not reply, and two more messages were later delivered to Hungary. The first, in 1239, was sent by the defeated Cuman tribes, who asked for and received asylum in Hungary. The second was sent in February 1241 by the defeated Polish princes.

Only then did King Béla call upon his magnates to join his army in defense of the country. He also asked the papacy and the Western European rulers for help. Foreign help came in the form of a small knight-detachment under the leadership of Frederick II, Duke of Austria, but it was too small to change the outcome of the campaign. The majority of the Hungarian magnates also did not realize the urgency of the matter. Some may have hoped that a defeat of the royal army would force Béla to discontinue his centralization efforts and thus strengthen their own power.

Although the Mongol danger was real and imminent, Hungary was not prepared to deal with it; in the minds of a people who had lived free from nomadic invasions for the last few hundred years, an invasion seemed impossible, and Hungary was no longer a predominantly soldier population. Only rich nobles were trained as heavy-armored cavalry. The Hungarians had long since forgotten the light-cavalry strategy and tactics of their ancestors, which were similar to those now used by the Mongols. The Hungarian army (some 60,000 on the eve of the Battle of Mohi) was made up of individual knights with tactical knowledge, discipline, and talented commanders. Because his army was not experienced in nomadic warfare, King Béla welcomed the Cuman King Kuthen (also known as Kotony) and his fighters. However, the Cuman invitation proved detrimental to the Hungarians because Batu Khan considered this acceptance of a group he considered rebels as justifications for his invasion of Hungary. After rumors began to circulate in Hungary that the Cumans were agents of the Mongols, some hot-headed Hungarians attacked the Cuman camp and killed Kotony. This led the enraged Cumans to ride south, ravaging the countryside, and slaughtering the unsuspecting Magyar population. The Austrian troops retreated to Austria shortly thereafter to gain more western aid. The Hungarians now stood alone in the defense of their country.

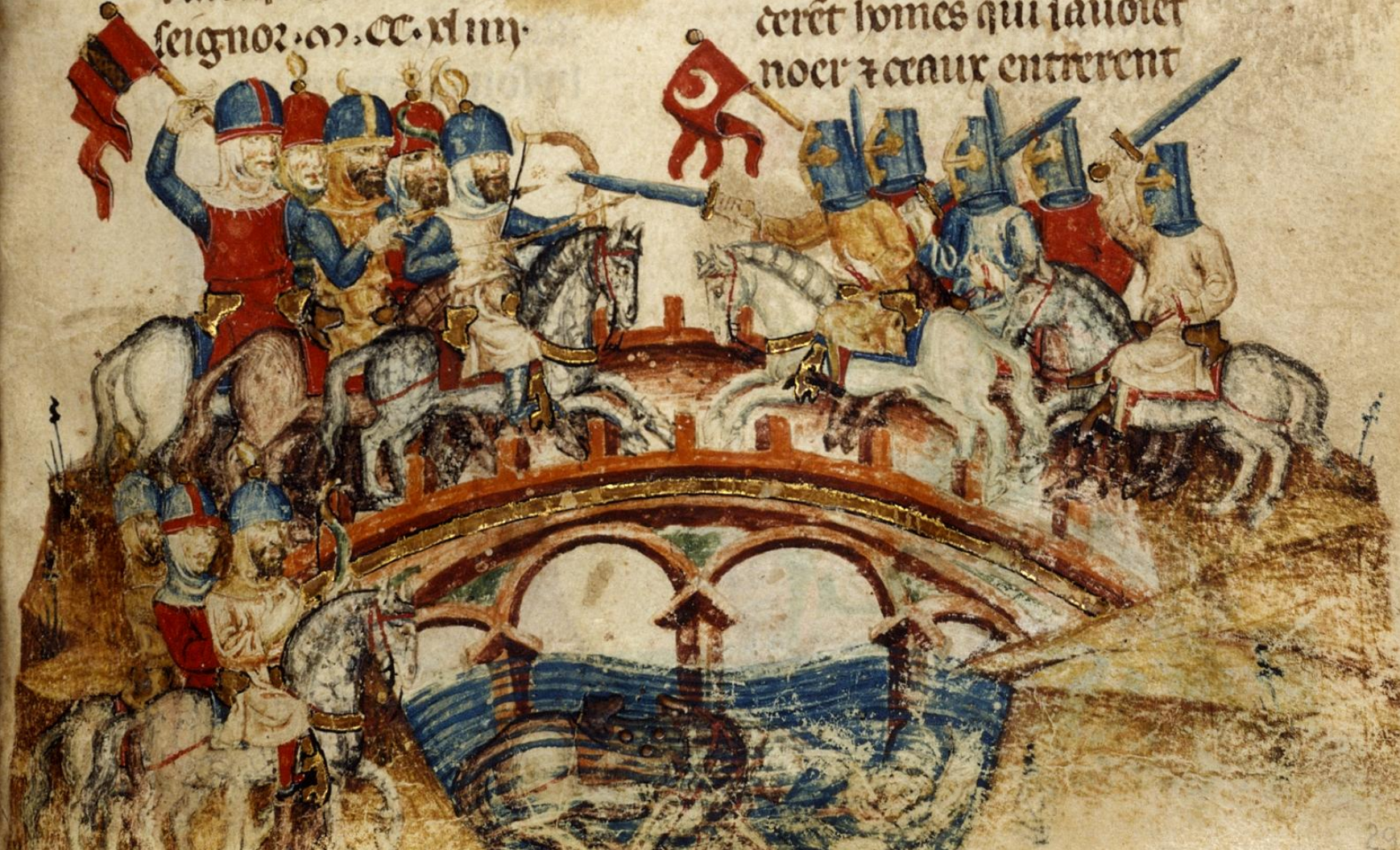
Battle of Mohi in a medieval-era depiction

The 1241 Mongol invasion first affected Moldavia and Wallachia (situated east and south of the Carpathians). Tens of thousands of Wallachians and Moldavians lost their lives defending their territories from the Golden Horde. Crops and goods plundered from Wallachian settlements seem to have been a primary supply source for the Golden Horde. The invaders killed up to half of the population and burned down most of their settlements, thus destroying much of the cultural and economic records from that period. Neither the Wallachians nor the army of Hungary offered much resistance against the Mongols. The swiftness of the invasion took many by surprise and forced them to retreat and hide in forests and the enclosed valleys of the Carpathians. In the end, however, the main target of the invasion was the Kingdom of Hungary.

The Hungarian army arrived and encamped at the Sajó River on April 10, 1241, without having been directly challenged by the Mongols. The Mongols, having largely concealed their positions, began their attack the next night; after heavier-than-expected losses inflicted by Hungarian crossbowmen, the Mongols adjusted their strategy and routed the Hungarian forces rapidly. A major Hungarian loss was imminent, and the Mongols intentionally left a gap in their formation to permit the wavering Hungarian forces to flee and spread out in doing so, leaving them unable to effectively resist the Mongols as they picked off the retreating Hungarian remnants. While the king escaped with the help of his bodyguard, the remaining Hungarian army was killed by the Mongols or drowned in the river as they attempted escape. Following their decisive victory, the Mongols now systematically occupied the Great Hungarian Plains, the slopes of the northern Carpathian Mountains, and Transylvania. Where they found local resistance, they killed the population. Where the locale offered no resistance, they forced the men into servitude in the Mongol army. Still, tens of thousands avoided Mongol domination by taking refuge behind the walls of the few existing fortresses or by hiding in the forests or large marshes along the rivers. The Mongols, instead of leaving the defenseless and helpless people and continuing their campaign through Pannonia to Western Europe, spent time securing and pacifying the occupied territories. On Christmas 1241, the costly siege of Esztergom destroyed the capital and economic center of the Kingdom of Hungary, forcing the capital to be moved to Buda.

During the winter, contrary to the traditional strategy of nomadic armies which started campaigns only in spring-time, they crossed the Danube and continued their systematic occupation, including Pannonia. They eventually reached the Austrian borders and the Adriatic shores in Dalmatia. The Mongols appointed a darughachi in Hungary and minted coins in the name of the Khagan. According to Michael Prawdin, the country of Béla was assigned to Orda by Batu as an appanage. At least 20–40% of the population died, by slaughter or epidemic. Rogerius of Apulia, an Italian monk and chronicler who witnessed and survived the invasion, pointed out not only the genocidal element of the occupation, but also that the Mongols especially "found pleasure" in humiliating local women. But while the Mongols claimed control of Hungary, they could not occupy fortified cities such as Fehérvár, Veszprém, Tihany, Győr, Pannonhalma, Moson, Sopron, Vasvár, Újhely, Zala, Léka, Pozsony, Nyitra, Komárom, Fülek and Abaújvár. Learning from this lesson, fortresses came to play a central role in Hungary's defense. King Béla IV rebuilt the country and invested in fortifications. Facing a shortage of money, he welcomed the settlement of Jewish families, investors, and tradesmen, granting them citizenship rights. The King also welcomed tens of thousands of Kun (Cumans) who had fled the country before the invasion. Chinese fire arrows were deployed by Mongols against the city of Buda on December 25, 1241, which they overran.

The Mongolian invasion taught the Magyars a simple lesson: although the Mongols had destroyed the countryside, the forts and fortified cities had survived. To improve their defense capabilities for the future, they had to build forts, not only on the borders but also inside the country. In the siege of Esztergom, the defenses managed to hold off the Mongolians despite the latter having overwhelming numerical superiority and 30 siege machines which they had just used to reduce the wooden towers of the city. During the remaining decades of the 13th century and throughout the 14th century, the kings donated more and more royal land to the magnates with the condition that they build forts and ensure their defenses.

==== Invasion of Croatia ====
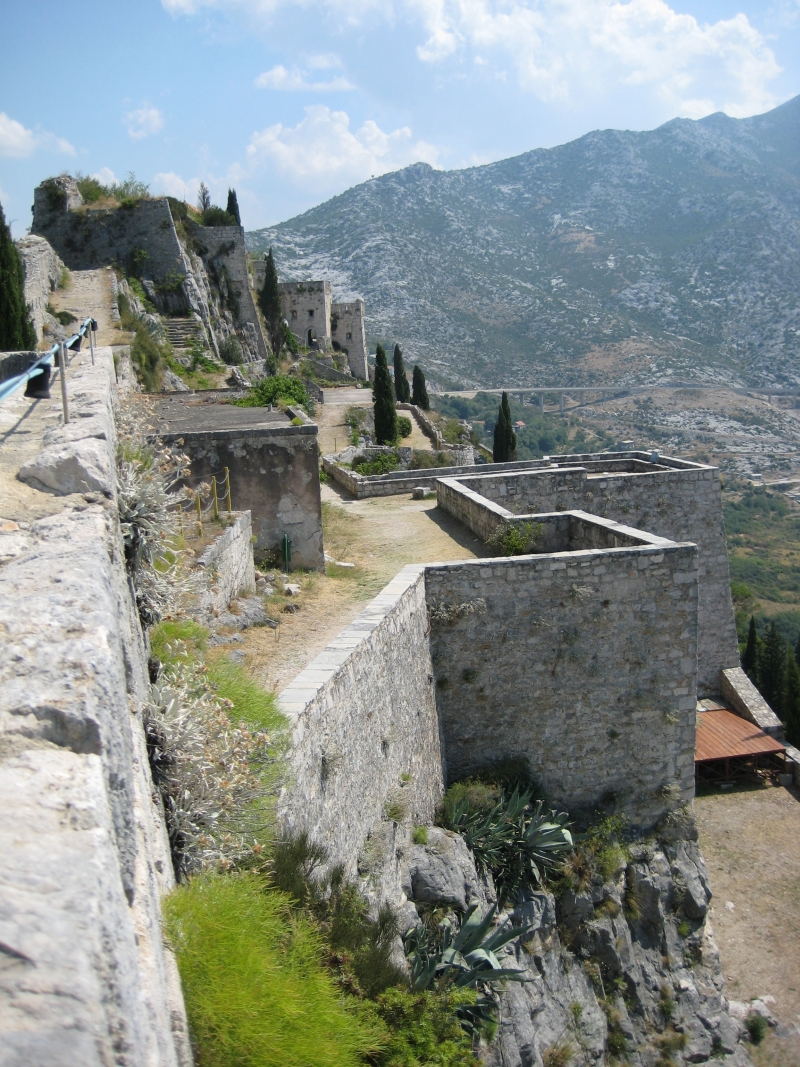
At Klis Fortress the Mongols experienced defeat in 1242.

During the Middle Ages, the Kingdom of Croatia was in a personal union with the Kingdom of Hungary, with Béla IV as a king.

After being routed on the banks of the Sajó river in 1241 by the Mongols, Béla IV fled to today's Zagreb in Croatia. Batu sent a few tumens (roughly 20,000 men at arms) under Khadan in pursuit of Bela. The major objective was not the conquest but the capture of the Arpad king. The poorly fortified Zagreb was unable to resist the invasion and was destroyed, its cathedral burned by Mongols. In preparation for a second invasion, Gradec was granted a royal charter or Golden Bull of 1242 by King Béla IV, after which citizens of Zagreb engaged in building defensive walls and towers around their settlement.

The Mongols' pursuit of Béla IV continued from Zagreb through Pannonia to Dalmatia. While in pursuit, the Mongols under the leadership of Kadan (Qadan) attacked Klis Fortress in Croatia in March 1242. Due to the strong fortifications of Klis, the Mongols dismounted and climbed over the walls using nearby cliffs. The defenders were able to inflict a number of casualties on the Mongols, which enraged the latter and caused them to fight hand to hand in the streets and gather a sizable amount of loot from houses. As soon as they learned that King Bela was elsewhere, they abandoned the attack and split off to attack Split and Trogir. The Mongols pursued Béla IV from town to town in Dalmatia, while Croatian nobility and Dalmatian towns such as Trogir and Rab helped Béla IV to escape. After being defeated by the Croatian soldiers, the Mongols retreated and Béla IV was awarded Croatian towns and nobility. Only the city of Split did not aid Béla IV in his escape from the Mongols. Some historians claim that the mountainous terrain of Croatian Dalmatia was fatal for the Mongols because of the great losses they suffered from Croat ambushes in mountain passes. In any case, though much of Croatia was plundered and destroyed, long-term occupation was unsuccessful.

Saint Margaret (January 27, 1242 – January 18, 1271), a daughter of Béla IV and Maria Laskarina, was born in Klis Fortress during the Mongol invasion of Hungary-Croatia in 1242.

Historians estimate that up to half of Hungary's two million population at that time were killed during the Mongol invasion of Europe.

=== Invasion of Austria ===
The subjugation of Hungary opened a pathway for the Mongol Horde to invade Vienna. Using similar tactics during their campaigns in previous Eastern and Central European countries, the Mongols first launched small squadrons to attack isolated settlements in the outskirts of Vienna in an attempt to instill fear and panic among the populace. In 1241 the Mongols raided Wiener Neustadt and its neighboring districts, located south of Vienna. Wiener Neustadt took the brunt of the attack and, like previous invasions, the Mongols committed horrible atrocities on the relatively unarmed populace. The city of Korneuburg, just north of Vienna, was also pillaged and destroyed. The Duke of Austria, Frederick II, had previously engaged the Mongols in Olomouc and in the initial stages of the Battle of Mohi. Unlike in Hungary however, Vienna under the leadership of Duke Frederick and his knights, together with their foreign allies, managed to rally quicker and annihilate the small Mongolian squadron. After the battle, the Duke estimated that the Mongols lost 300 to upwards of 700 men, while the defending Europeans lost 100. Austrian knights also subsequently defeated the Mongols at the borders of the River Morava in the district of Dévény (Devín). After the failed initial raids, the rest of the Mongols retreated after learning of the Great Khan Ögedei's death.

=== Invasion of Bulgaria ===
During his withdrawal from Hungary back into Ruthenia, part of Batu Khan's army invaded Bulgaria. A Mongolian force was defeated by the Bulgarian army under Tsar Ivan Asen II. A larger force returned to raid Bulgaria again the same year, though little is known of what happened. According to the Persian historian Rashid-al-Din Hamadani, the Bulgarian capital of Tarnovo was sacked. This is unlikely, but rumor of it spread widely, being repeated in Palestine by Bar Hebraeus. The invasion of Bulgaria is mentioned in other contemporary sources, such as Philippe Mouskès, Thomas of Cantimpré and Ricoldo of Montecroce. Contemporary documents indicate that by 1253, Michael Asen of Bulgaria was a tribute-paying vassal of the Mongols, a status the country had probably been forced to accept during the invasion of 1242.

== European tactics against Mongols ==
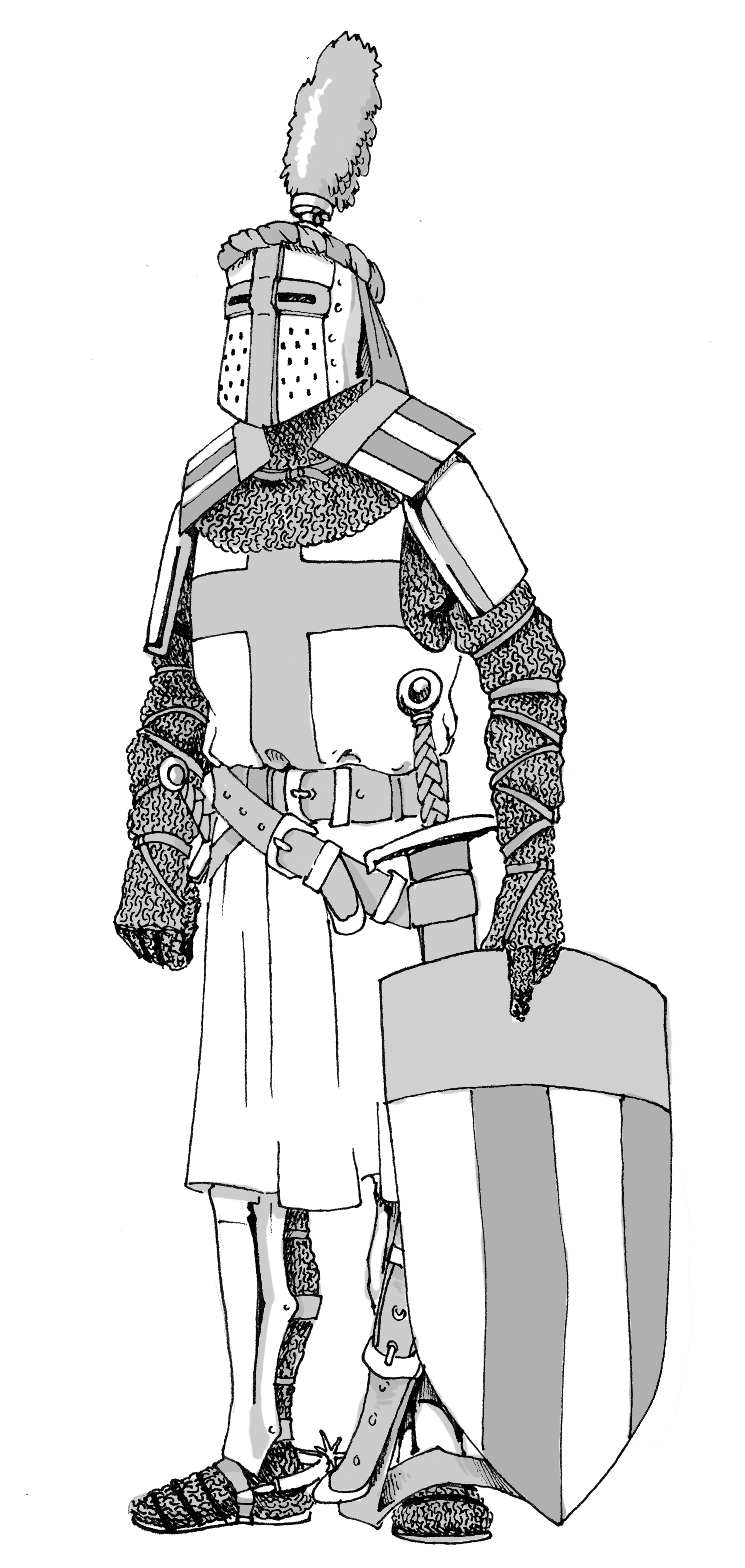
European knight in the 13th century

The traditional European method of warfare of melee combat between knights ended in catastrophe when it was deployed against the Mongol forces as the Mongols were able to keep a distance and advance with superior numbers. The New Encyclopædia Britannica, Volume 29 says that "Employed against the Mongol invaders of Europe, knightly warfare failed even more disastrously for the Poles at the Battle of Legnica and the Hungarians at the Battle of Mohi in 1241. Feudal Europe was saved from sharing the fate of China and the Grand Duchy of Moscow not by its tactical prowess but by the unexpected death of the Mongols' supreme ruler, Ögedei, and the subsequent eastward retreat of his armies.". However, this explanation from the 15th Edition of New Encyclopædia Britannica (1974) is nowadays considered oversimplified and even incorrect (See End of the Mongol advance). Batu Khan retreated to Volga River in southern Russia and spent the next several years establishing his own independent realm, the Golden Horde. The next Kurultai in Mongolia did not take place until 1246, five years later. A Mongol army travelling with 3 to 5 horses per warrior required large amounts of grass. Hungary's Great Plain could only support a limited number of horses. By spring 1242, local pasture was depleted, and severe wet weather had turned the Hungarian plains into muddy bogs, ruining horse grazing and weakening Mongol composite bows. Finally, stone build fortresses in the region allowed European forces entrench inside (Pressburg, Klis, and Esztergom), created a war of attrition the Mongols could not easily win.

However, during the initial Mongol invasion and the subsequent raids afterwards, heavily armored knights and cavalry proved more effective at fighting the Mongols than their light-armored counterparts. During the Battle of Mohi, for example, while the Hungarian light cavalry and infantry were decimated by Mongol forces, the heavily armored knights in their employ, such as the Knights Templar, proved far more effective. During the Battle of Legnica, the Knights Templar that numbered between 65 and 88 during the battle lost only three knights and 2 sergeants. Austrian knights under Duke Frederick also fared better in fighting the Mongol invasion in Vienna.

King Béla IV of Hungary hired the help of the Knights Hospitaller, as well as training his own better-armed local knights, in preparation for the Second Mongol invasion of Hungary. In the decades following the Mongolian raids on European settlements, Western armies (particularly Hungary) started to adapt to the Mongol tactics by building better fortifications against siege weapons and improving their heavy cavalry. After the division of the Mongol Empire into four fragments, when the Golden Horde attempted the next invasion of Hungary, Hungary had increased their proportion of knights (led by Ladislaus IV of Hungary) and they quickly defeated the main Golden Horde Army in the hills of western Transylvania.

Also, by this time, many Eastern and Central European countries had ended their hostilities with one another and united to finally drive out the remnants of the Golden Horde. Guerrilla warfare and stiff resistance also helped many Europeans, particularly those in Croatia and Durdzuketia, in preventing the Mongols from setting a permanent hold and driving them off.

== Possible Mongol diffusion of gunpowder to Europe ==
Several sources mention the Mongols deploying firearms and gunpowder weapons against European forces at the Battle of Mohi in various forms, including bombs hurled via catapult. Professor Kenneth Warren Chase credits the Mongols for introducing gunpowder and its associated weaponry into Europe. A later legend arose in Europe about a mysterious Berthold Schwarz who is credited with the invention of gunpowder by 15th- through 19th-century European literature.

== End of the Mongol advance ==
During 1241, most of the Mongol forces were resting on the Hungarian Plain. In late March 1242, they began to withdraw. The most common reason given for this withdrawal is the Great Khan Ögedei's death on December 11, 1241. Ögedei Khan died at the age of fifty-six after a binge of drinking during a hunting trip, which forced most of the Mongolian army to retreat back to Mongolia so that the princes of the blood could be present for the election of a new great khan. This is attested to by one primary source: the chronicle of Giovanni da Pian del Carpine, who after visiting the Mongol court, stated that the Mongols withdrew for this reason; he further stated that God had caused the Great Khan's death to protect Latin Christendom. As Stephen Pow pointed out in his analysis of this issue, by Carpini's account, a messenger would have to be able to make the journey from Mongolia to Central Europe in a little over three months at a minimum; the messenger would have to arrive in March, meaning he took about three months in the middle of winter from the time of the khan's death. Carpini himself accompanied a Mongol party in a much shorter journey (from Kiev to Mongolia) in 1246, where the party "made great speed" in order to reach the election ceremony in time, and made use of several horses per person while riding nearly all day and night. It took five months.

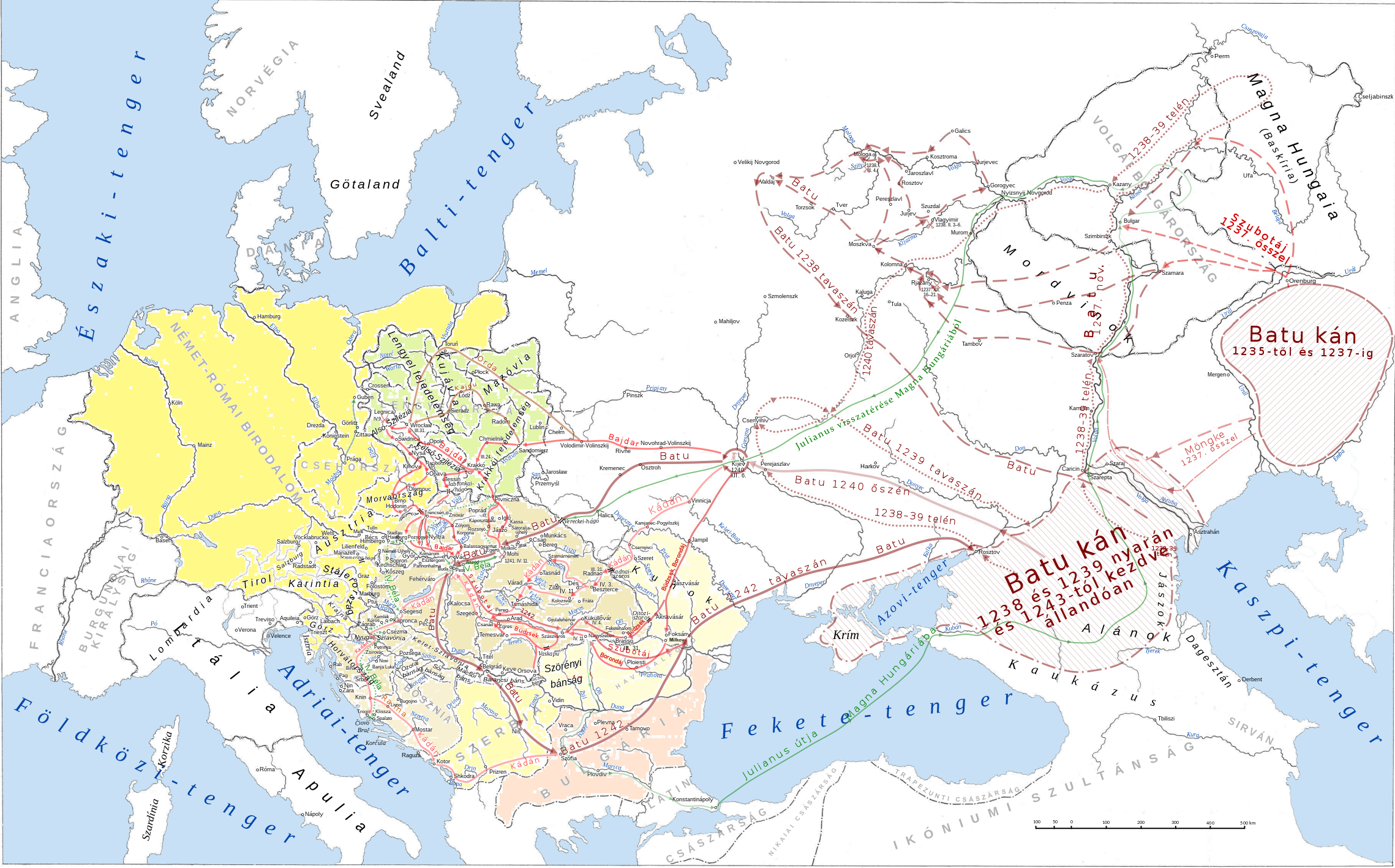
Mongol invasions in Europe (1235–1242)

Rashid Al-Din, a historian of the Mongol Ilkhanate, explicitly states in the Ilkhanate's official histories that the Mongols were not even aware of Ögedei's death when they began their withdrawal. Al-Din, writing under the auspices of the Mongol Empire, had access to the official Mongol chronicle when compiling his history, the Altan Debter. John Andrew Boyle asserts, based on the orthography, that Al-Din's account of the withdrawal from central Europe was taken verbatim from Mongolian records.

Another theory is that weather data preserved in tree rings points to a series of warm, dry summers in the region until 1242. When temperatures dropped and rainfall increased, the local climate shifted to a wetter and colder environment. That, in turn, caused flooding of the formerly dry grasslands and created a marshy terrain. Those conditions would have been less than ideal for the nomadic Mongol cavalry and their encampments, reducing their mobility and pastureland, curtailing their invasion into Europe west of the Hungarian plain, and hastening their retreat.

The true reasons for the Mongol withdrawal are not fully known, but numerous plausible explanations exist. The Mongol invasion had bogged down into a series of costly and frustrating sieges, where they gained little loot and ran into stiff resistance. They had lost a large number of men despite their victories (see above). Finally, they were stretched thin in the European theater, and were experiencing a rebellion by the Cumans (Batu returned to put it down, and spent roughly a year doing so).

Regardless of their reasons, the Mongols had completely withdrawn from Central Europe by mid-1242, though they still launched military operations in the west at this time, most notably the 1241–1243 Mongol invasion of Anatolia. Batu specifically decided against attending the kurultai in favor of staying in Europe, which delayed the ceremony for several years.

The historian Jack Weatherford claims that the Mongol invasion concluded when the geography was no longer in their favor. To venture farther would have put their army at a disadvantage. This was because there was no more pastureland, which their methods of warfare relied upon, and the more humid coastal climate would weaken the Mongol bows. However, a counter to this assertion is that the Mongols were willing to fight in the densely populated areas of Song China and India. The Mongols did conquer Southern China, which is located in a tropical climate zone and would have received far more rainfall and humidity than anywhere in Europe. The territory of Western Europe had more forests and castles than the Mongols were accustomed to, and there were opportunities for the European heavy cavalry to counter-attack. Also, despite the steppe tactics of the Avars and early Hungarians, both were defeated by Western states in the 9th and 10th centuries, though many states conquered by the Mongols have also faced steppe tactics successfully before. A significant number of important castles and towns in Hungary had also resisted Mongol siege tactics.

John Keegan thought that Europeans had an advantage due to more food surpluses enabling better campaigns, and larger horses.

Some historians believe that the reason for Batu's stopping at the Mohi River was that he never intended to advance further. He had made the new Rus' conquests secure for the years to come, and when the Great Khan died and Batu rushed back to Mongolia to put in his claim for power, it ended his westward expansion. Subutai's recall at the same time left the Mongol armies without their spiritual head and primary strategist. Batu Khan was not able to resume his plans for conquest to the "Great Sea" (the Atlantic Ocean) until 1255, after the turmoil after Ögedei's death had finally subsided with the election of Möngke Khan as Great Khan.

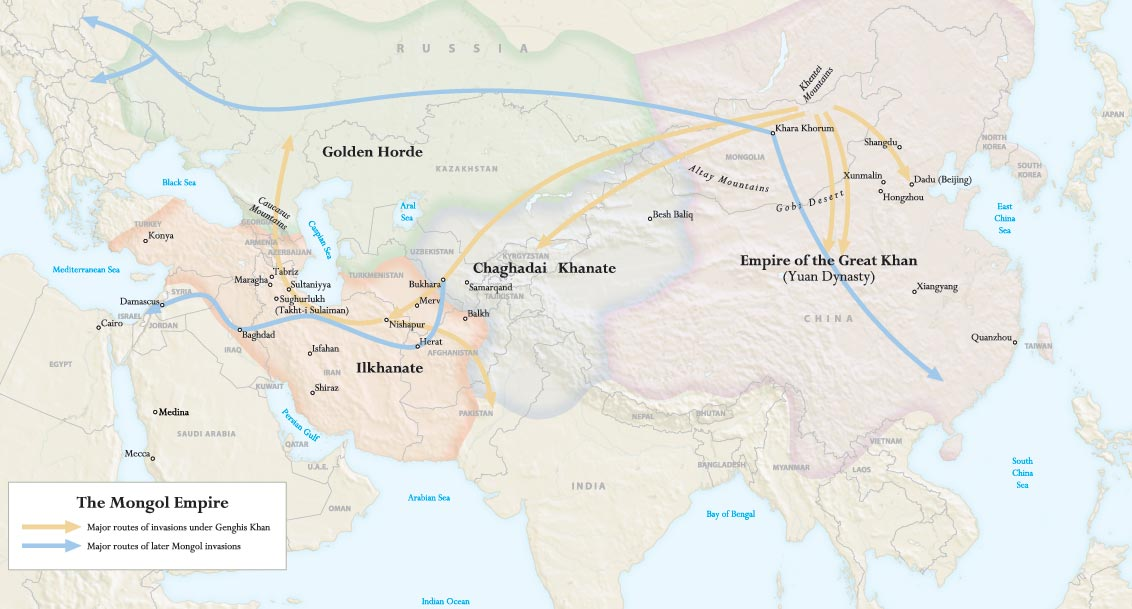
Mongol successor khanates

From 1241 to 1248, a state of almost open warfare existed between Batu, son of Jochi, and Güyük, son of Ögedei. The Mongol Empire was ruled by a regency under Ögedei's widow Töregene Khatun, whose only goal was to secure the Great Khanate for her son, Güyük. There was so much bitterness between the two branches of the family that when Güyük died in 1248, he was on his way to confront Batu to force him to accept his authority. Batu also had problems in his last years with the Principality of Halych-Volhynia, whose ruler, Danylo of Halych, adopted a policy of confronting the Golden Horde and defeated some Mongol assaults in 1254. He was finally defeated in 1259, when Berke ruled the Horde. Batu Khan was unable to turn his army west until 1255, after Möngke had become Great Khan in 1251, and he had repaired his relations with the Great Khanate. However, as he prepared to finish the invasion of Europe, he died. His son did not live long enough to implement his father and Subutai's plan to invade Europe, and with his death, Batu's younger brother Berke became Khan of the Kipchak Khanate. Berke was not interested in invading Europe as much as stopping his cousin Hulagu Khan from ravaging the Holy Land. Berke had converted to Islam and watched with horror as his cousin destroyed the Abbasid Caliphate, the spiritual head of Islam as far as Berke was concerned. The Mamluks of Egypt, learning through spies that Berke was both a Muslim and not fond of his cousin, appealed to him for help and were careful to nourish their ties to him and his Khanate.

Both entities were Turkic in origin. Many of the Mamluks were of Turkic descent and Berke's Khanate was almost totally Turkic also. Jochi, Genghis Khan's oldest son, was of disputed parentage and only received 4,000 Mongol warriors to start his Khanate. His warriors were virtually all Turkic people who had submitted to the Mongols. Thus, the Khanate was Turkic in culture and had more in common with their Muslim Turkic Mamluks brothers than with the Mongol shamanist Hulagu and his horde. Thus, when Hulagu Khan began to mass his army for war against the Mamluk-controlled Holy Land, they swiftly appealed to Berke Khan who sent armies against his cousin and forced him to defend his domains in the north.

Hulagu returned to his lands by 1262, but instead of being able to avenge his defeats, had to turn north to face Berke Khan, suffering severe defeat in an attempted invasion north of the Caucasus in 1263, after Berke Khan had lured him north and away from the Holy Land. Thus, the Kipchak Khanate never invaded Europe, keeping watch to the south and east instead. Berke sent troops into Europe only twice, in two relatively light raids in 1259 and 1265, simply to collect booty he needed to pay for his wars against Hulagu from 1262 to 1265.

== Europe at the time of the Mongol invasion ==
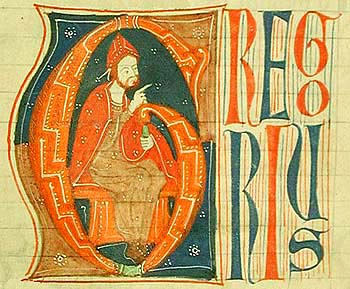
Pope Gregory IX sanctioned a small Crusade against the Mongols in mid-1241

The Papacy had rejected the pleas of Georgia in favor of launching crusades against the Moors and Saracens in the Iberian Peninsula and the Middle East, as well as preaching a Crusade against Kievan Rus in 1238 for refusing to join his earlier Balkan Crusade. Meanwhile, Emperor Frederick II, a well-educated ruler, wanted to annex Italy to unite his separated kingdoms of the Holy Roman Empire and Sicily. In addition to calling a council to depose the Holy Roman Emperor, Pope Gregory IX and his successor Innocent IV excommunicated Frederick four times and labeled him the Antichrist.

In the 1240s the efforts of Christendom were already divided between five Crusades, only one of which was aimed against the Mongols. Initially, when Bela sent messengers to the Pope to request a Crusade against the Mongols, the Pope tried to convince them to instead join his crusade against the Holy Roman Emperor. Eventually Pope Gregory IX did promise a Crusade and the Church finally helped sanction a small Crusade against the Mongols in mid-1241, but it was diverted when he died in August 1241. Instead of fighting the Mongols, the resources gathered by the Crusade was used to fight a crusade against the Hohenstaufen after the German barons revolted against the Holy Roman Emperor's son Conrad in September 1241.

== Later raids ==
The Golden Horde raids in the 1280s (those in Bulgaria, Hungary, and Poland), were much greater in scale than anything since the 1241–1242 invasion, thanks to the lack of civil war in the Mongol Empire at the time. They have sometimes been collectively referred to as "the second Mongol invasion of Europe", "the second Tatar-Mongol invasion of central and south-eastern Europe", or "the second Mongol invasion of central Europe."

=== Against Poland (1259 and 1287) ===
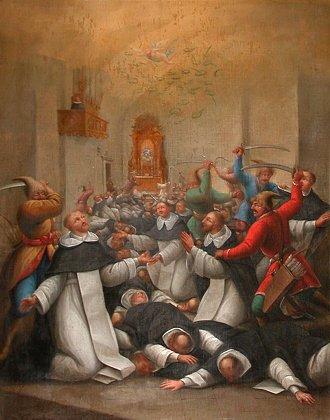
Martyrdom of Sadok and 48 Dominican martyrs of Sandomierz during the Second Mongol invasion of Poland

In 1259, eighteen years after the first attack, two tumens (20,000 men) from the Golden Horde, under the leadership of Berke, attacked Poland after raiding Lithuania. This attack was commanded by general Burundai with young princes Nogai and Talabuga. Lublin, Sieradz, Sandomierz, Zawichost, Kraków, and Bytom were ravaged and plundered. Berke had no intention of occupying or conquering Poland. After this raid the Pope Alexander IV tried without success to organize a crusade against the Horde.

An unsuccessful invasion followed in 1287, led by Talabuga and Nogai Khan. 30,000 men (three tumens) in two columns under Nogai (10,000 Mongol cavalry) and Talabuga (20,000 Mongols and Ruthenians) respectively raided Lesser Poland to plunder the area and meet up north of Kraków. Lublin, Mazovia, and Sieradz were successfully raided, but the Mongols failed to capture Sandomierz and Kraków and were repulsed with heavy casualties when they attempted to assault the cities, although the cities were devastated. Talabuga's main army (the rest of his column having dissolved across the countryside for raiding) was defeated by Duke Leszek II at the Battle of Łagów. After this severe setback, Talabuga linked back up with the raiding parties and fled Poland with the loot that was already taken. Nogai's column, after suffering losses during the assault on Kraków, split up to raid the lands both north and south of the city. One detachment headed towards the town of Stary Sącz, another to Podolínec, and others to the Duchy of Sieradz. The first detachment was surprised and defeated by the Poles and their Hungarian allies in the Battle of Stary Sącz, while the second devastated the area of Podhale while skirmishing with the locals. After the defeat at Stary Sącz, Nogai's whole column retreated into Ruthenia.

=== Against Byzantine Thrace (1265, 1324 and 1337) ===
During the reign of Berke there was also a raid against Thrace. In the winter of 1265, the Bulgarian czar, Constantine Tych, requested Mongol intervention against the Byzantines in the Balkans. Nogai Khan led a Mongol raid of 20,000 cavalry (two tumens) against the territories of Byzantine eastern Thrace. In early 1265, Michael VIII Palaeologus confronted the Mongols, but his smaller squadron apparently had very low morale and was quickly routed. Most of them were cut down as they fled. Michael was forced to retreat to Constantinople on a Genoese ship while Nogai's army plundered all of Thrace. Following this defeat, the Byzantine emperor made an alliance with the Golden Horde (which was massively beneficial for the latter), giving his daughter Euphrosyne in marriage to Nogai. Michael also sent much valuable fabric to Golden Horde as tribute.

Thrace also suffered raids in 1324 and 1337, during the reign of Uzbeg Khan.

=== Against Bulgaria (1271, 1274, 1280 and 1285) ===
The successors of Tsar Ivan Asen II – the regency of Kaliman Asen I decided to pay tax to the Golden Horde. In 1271 Nogai Khan led a successful raid against the country, which was a vassal of the Golden Horde until the early 14th century. Bulgaria was again raided by the Mongols in 1274, 1280 and 1285. In 1278 and 1279 Tsar Ivailo led the Bulgarian army and crushed the Mongol raids before being surrounded at Silistra. After a three-month siege, he managed to once again break through the elite Mongol forces, forcing them to retreat north of the Danube. In 1280 a rebellion inspired by Byzantium left Ivailo without much support, and so he fled to Nogai's camp, asking him for help before being killed by the Mongols. Tsar George I, however, became a Mongol vassal before the Mongol threat was finally ended with the reign of Theodore Svetoslav.

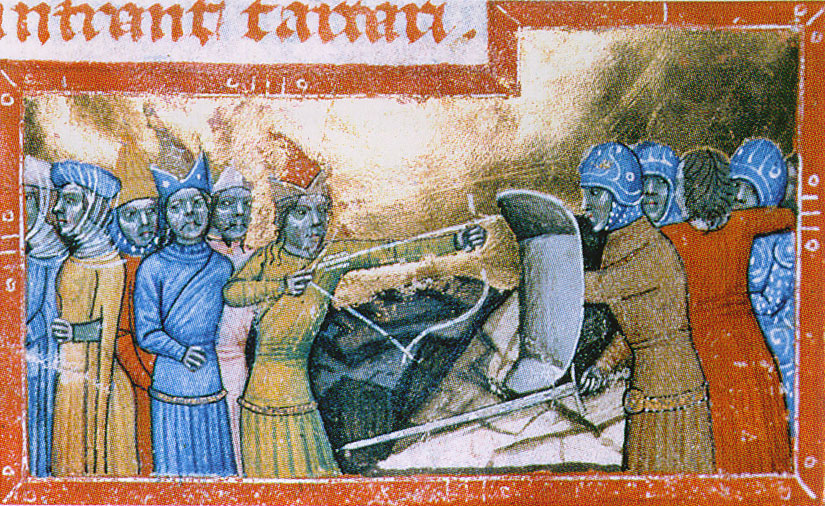
Mongol invasion of Hungary in 1285 (Chronicon Pictum, 1358)

=== Against Hungary (1285) ===
In 1285 Nogai Khan led a raid of Hungary alongside Talabuga. Nogai lead an army that ravaged Transylvania with success: Cities like Reghin, Brașov and Bistrița were plundered and ravaged. However Talabuga, who led the main army in Northern Hungary, was stopped by the heavy snow of the Carpathians and the invading force was defeated near Pest by the royal army of Ladislaus IV and ambushed by the Székely in the return. Nogai's own column suffered serious casualties. As with later invasions, it was repelled handily, the Mongols losing much of their invading force. The outcome could not have contrasted more sharply with the 1241 invasion, mostly due to the reforms of Béla IV, which included advances in military tactics and, most importantly, the widespread building of stone castles, both responses to the defeat of the Hungarian Kingdom in 1241. The failed Mongol attack on Hungary greatly reduced the Golden Horde's military power and caused them to stop disputing Hungarian borders.

=== Against Serbia (1291) ===
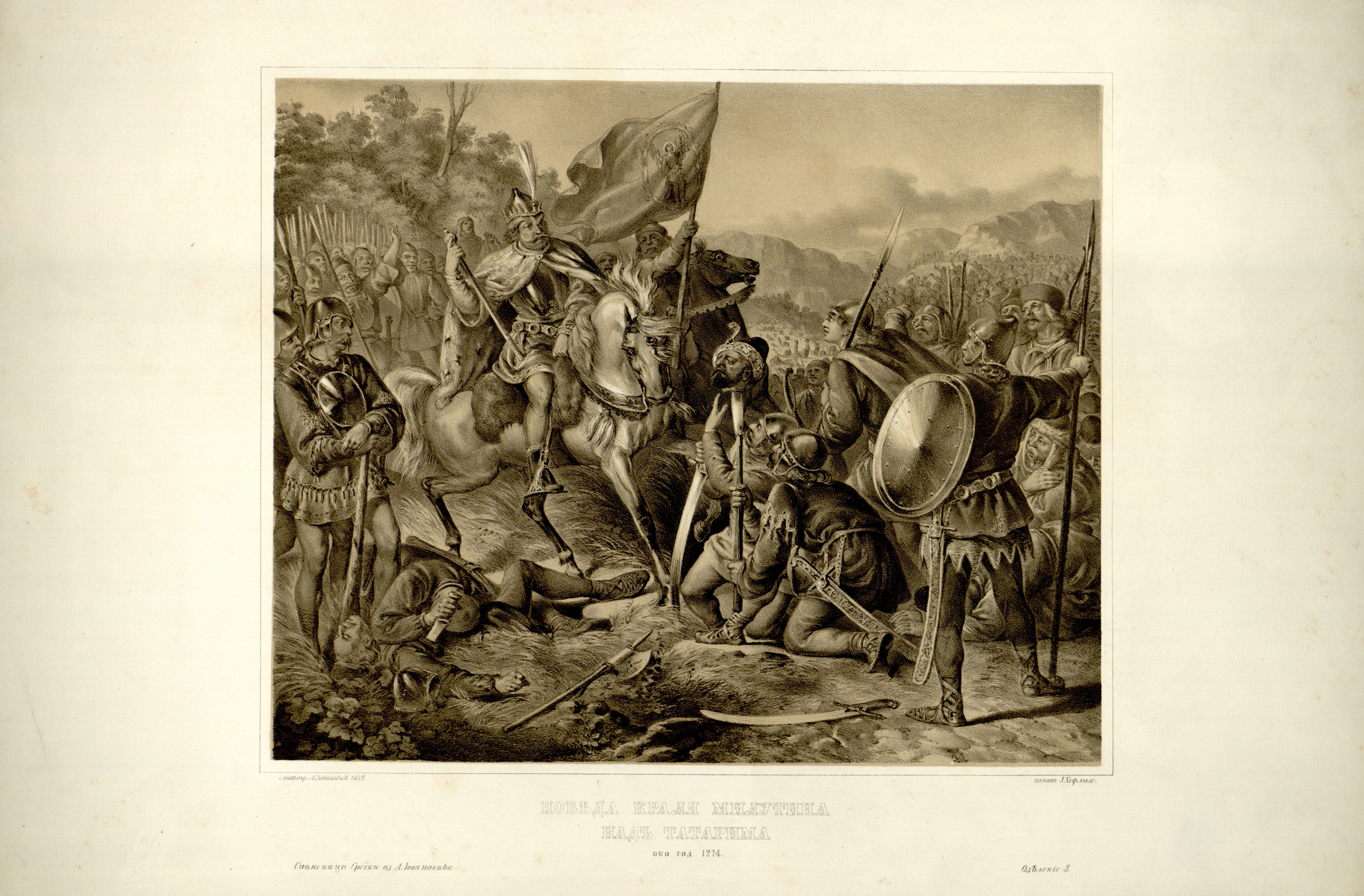
Serbian king Uroš II Milutin after victory over Mongols

In 1291 a large Mongol-Bulgarian alliance raided into Serbia, where Serbian king Stefan Uroš II Milutin defeated the Mongolian contingent. However, after a threat that Nogai himself will return with the Golden Horde, the Serbian king acknowledged Nogai's supremacy and sent his son as hostage to prevent further hostility when Nogai threatened to lead a punitive expedition himself.

=== Against Germany (1340) ===
Contemporary Swiss historian John of Winterthur reports attacks by the Mongols on Hungary, and the German lands March of Brandenburg and Prussia during the period of 1340–1341.

=== Counter-invasions of Europe ===
By the mid-14th century the grip of the Golden Horde over Central and Eastern Europe had started to weaken. Several European kingdoms started various incursions into Mongol-controlled lands with the aim of reclaiming captured territories as well as adding new ones from the Empire itself. The Kingdom of Georgia, under the leadership of King George V the Brilliant, restored Georgian dominance in their own lands and even took the Empire of Trebizond from Mongol hands. Lithuania, taking advantage of internal strifes in the Golden Horde, started an invasion of their own, defeating the Mongols at the Battle at Blue Waters, as well as conquering territories of the Golden Horde such as the Principality of Kiev all the way to the Dnieper River, before being halted after their defeat at the Battle of the Vorskla River. The Duchy of Moscow also started to reclaim many Rus' lands, eventually developing into the Tsardom of Russia. In 1345, the Kingdom of Hungary took the initiative and launched their own invasion force into Mongolian territory, capturing what would become Moldavia.

By this point, some Western European armies also started to meet the Mongols in their conquered territories. In the siege of Caffa for example, when the Mongols under Janibeg besieged Caffa in Crimea, a relief force of a Genoese army came and defeated the Mongols, killing 15,000 of their troops and destroying their siege engines. A year later, the Genoese blockaded Mongol ports in the region, forcing Janibeg to negotiate, and in 1347 the Genoese were allowed to reestablish their colony in Tana on the Sea of Azov.

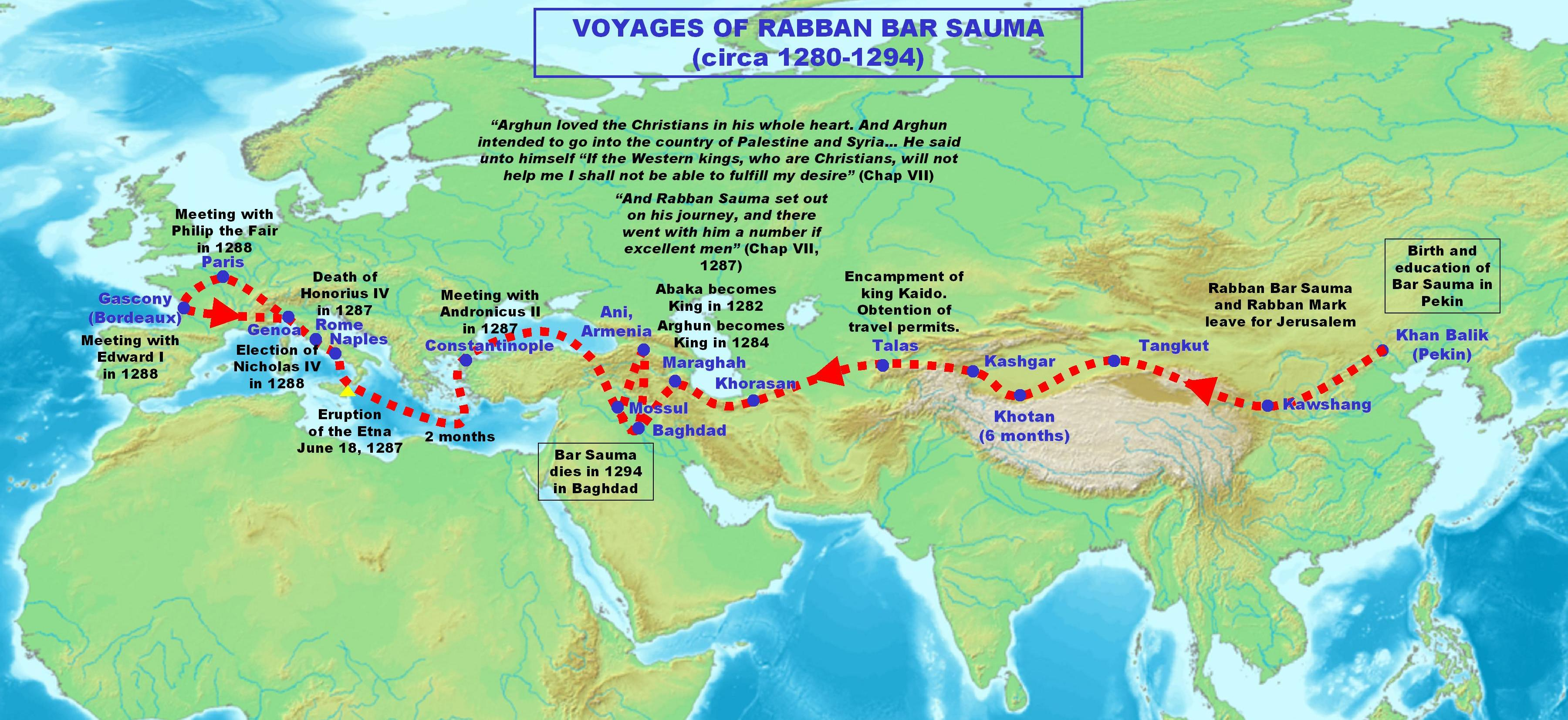
Voyage of the Mongol Embassy of 1280s to the European monarchies of the time, from Beijing to Bourdeaux.

On the other hand, some European Monarchies made attempts to develop a Christian-Mongol alliance in the later Crusades against the local Muslim states like the Mamluk Sultanate of Egypt, which were also in war with the Ilkhanate of Iran at the simultaneous Mongol invasions of the Levant, expecting to reunify the communion between Eastern Christianity (mostly under Mongol kingship at the time) and Western Christianity with the Papacy. An example of this approachment was the embassy of the Uyghur Chinese Christian, Rabban Sawma, to the Crusader states, the Byzantine Empire and the Western European monarchies (like the English monarchy, the French monarchy, the Holy Roman Empire and the Papal States) on the 1280s.

== Gallery ==
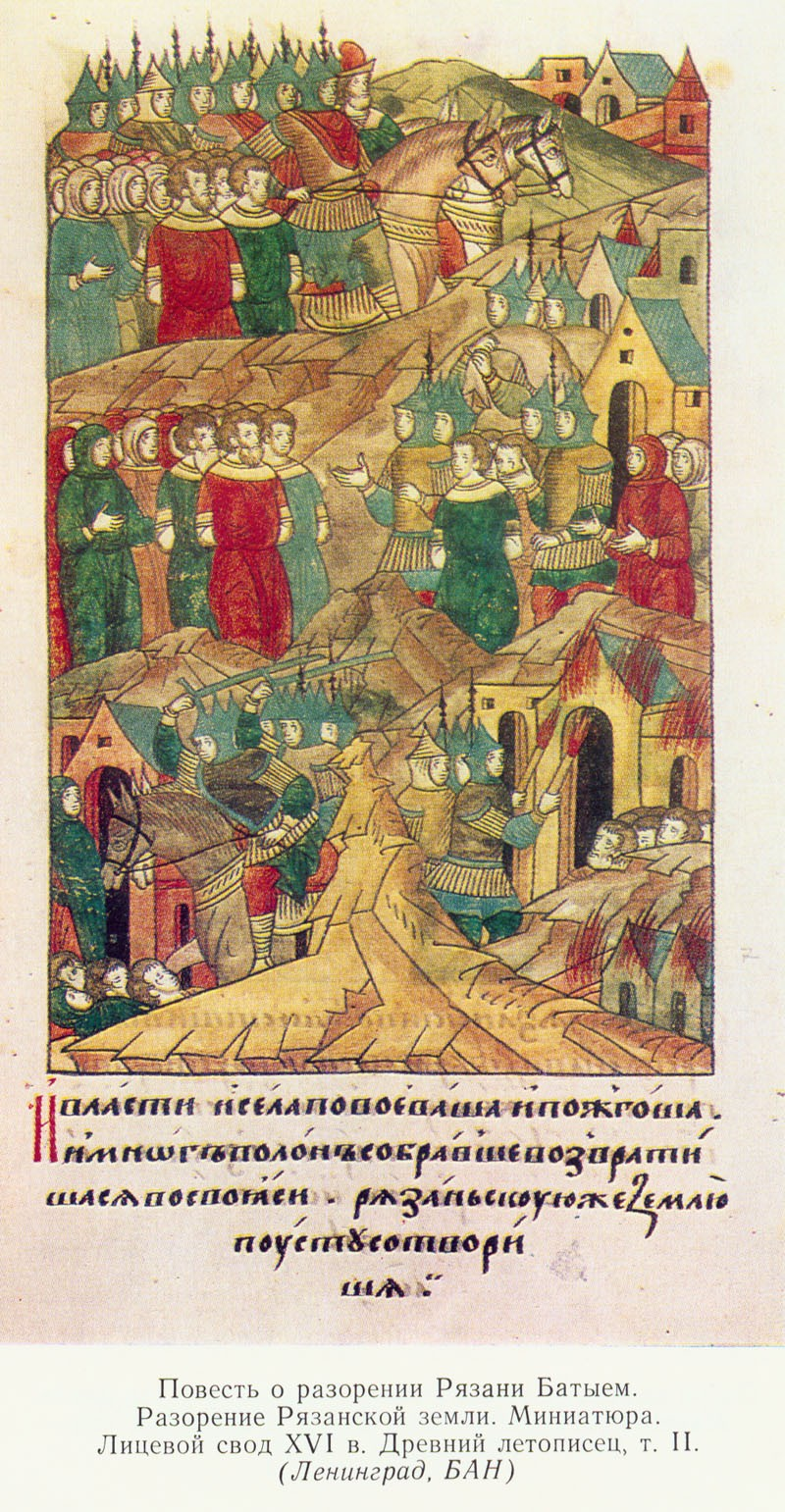
Golden Horde raid at old Ryazan.

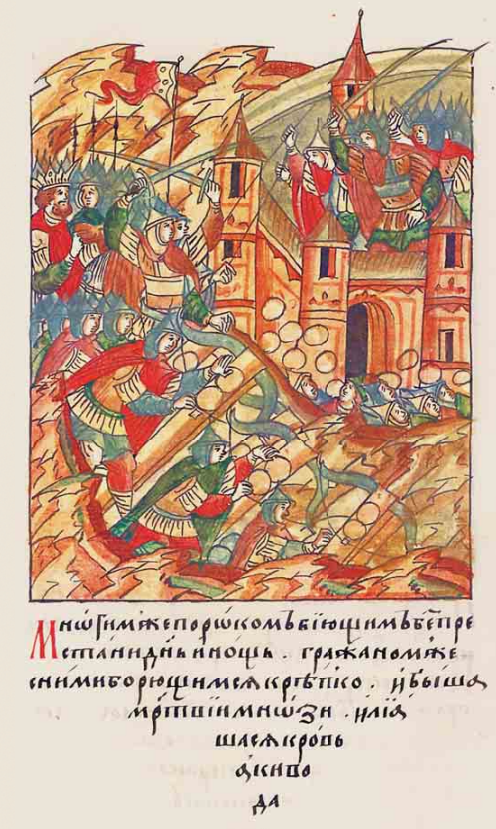
Golden Horde raid at Kiev

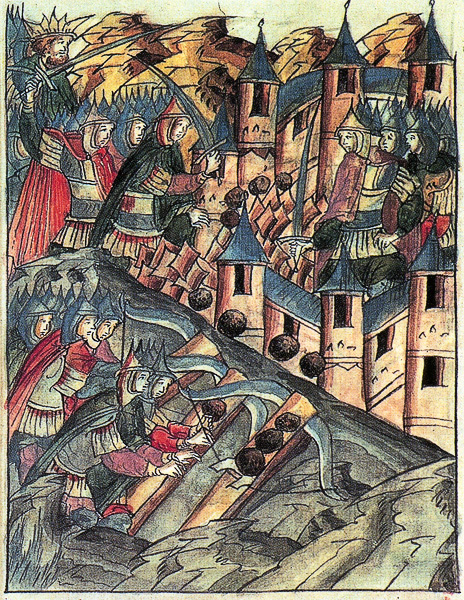
Golden Horde raid at Kozelsk

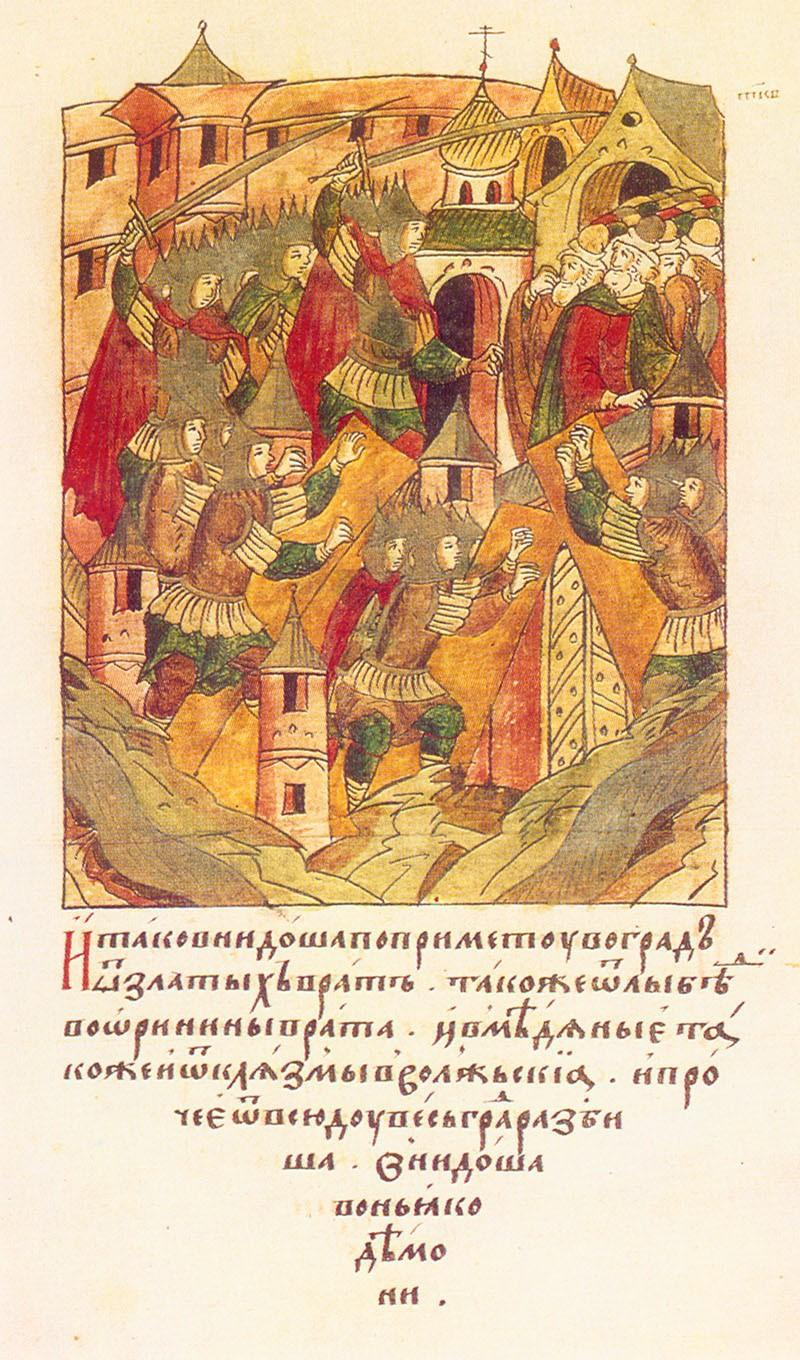
Golden Horde raid Vladimir

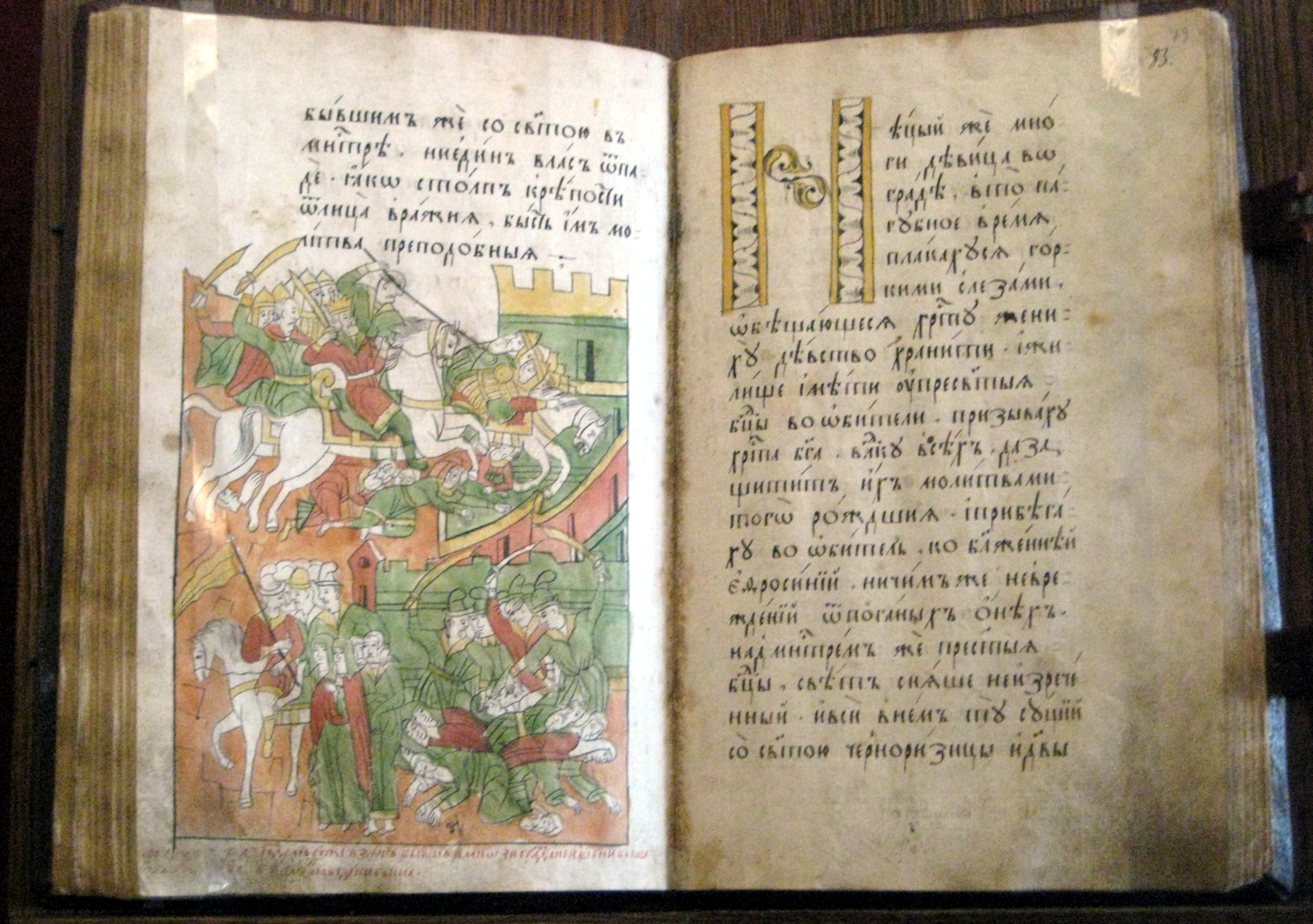
Golden Horde raid Suzdal

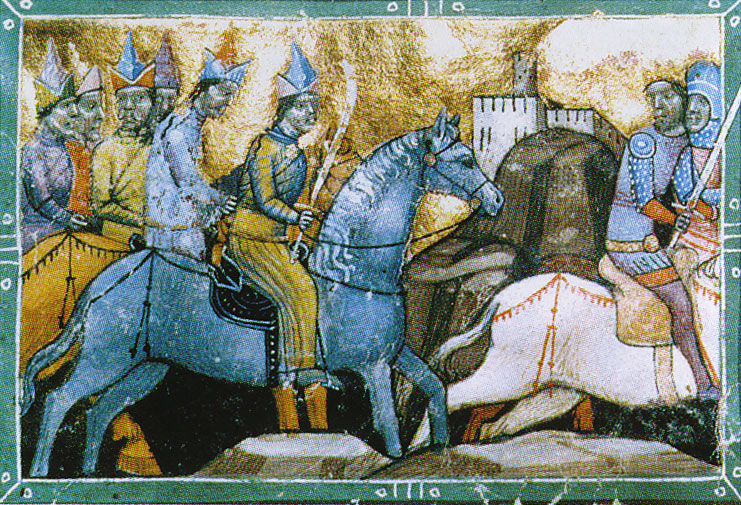
The Hungarian King Béla IV on the flight from the Mongols under general Kadan of the Golden Horde.

== See also ==
- Slave trade in the Mongol Empire
- Franco-Mongol alliance
- Lists of battles of the Mongol invasion of Europe
  - List of battles of the Mongol invasion of Kievan Rus'
- Mongol invasions and conquests
- Mongol military tactics and organization
- Romania in the Early Middle Ages
- Timeline of the Golden Horde
- Timeline of the Mongol Empire
- War of the Heavenly Horses
