= Czermno, Lublin Voivodeship =

Czermno
- Village
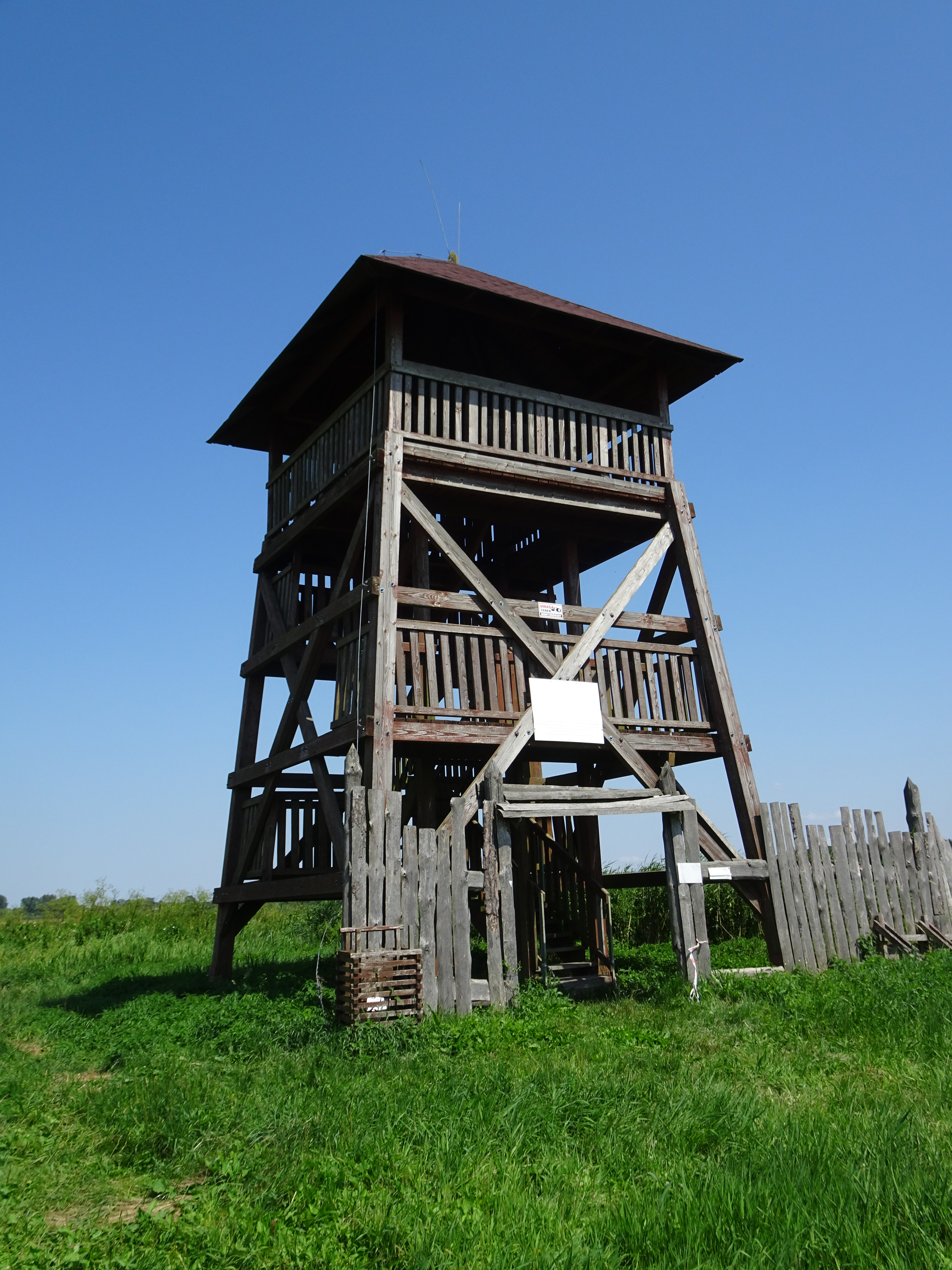

- Location within Poland
- Coordinates: 50°39′N 23°41′E
- Country: Poland
- Voivodeship: Lublin
- County: Tomaszów
- Gmina: Tyszowce

Czermno [ˈt͡ʂɛrmnɔ] is a village in the administrative district of Gmina Tyszowce, within Tomaszów County, Lublin Voivodeship, in eastern Poland.

In the early Middle Ages, Czerwien/Czermno was one of the largest Slavic gords of this part of Europe. Its history dates back to the 5th/6th century, and Czermno probably was main center of the so-called “Czerwien/Cherven Towns”. Czermno/Czerwien was first mentioned in 981, when Vladimir the Great captured it from the Poles. Czerwien remained part of Kievan Rus' until the Mongol invasion of Europe, when it was probably ransacked and destroyed.

The location of the historic gord in what is today the village of Czerwien was confirmed by archaeologists, who worked here in 1952, 1976–79 and 1997. Total area of the gord was probably 100 hectares, divided into center, suburbs, settlements and three cemeteries. It was spread along both banks of the Huczew river, with a wooden bridge joining the two parts of the village. Czerwien was protected by ramparts and moats, there also were piers for boats. According to archaeologists, in the early Middle Ages it was as large as main centers of early Polish statehood, Poznań and Gniezno.

In April 2011, two hoards of silver jewellery were found by archaeologists during the excavation of the early medieval castle and associated settlement at Czermno. The hoards, which were situated 20 metres apart, comprised about forty items of jewellery, including earrings, finger rings, armlets, bracelets, and temple pendants. One of the hoards was found in an earthenware pot, and the other hoard was probably originally placed in a cloth or leather bag which has since decayed. The jewellery dates to the 13th century, and it is thought that the hoards may have been buried in response to the Mongol invasion of Poland in 1240.
