= Cherven Cities =

Territories disputed by Poland and Kievan Rus' during the Middle Ages

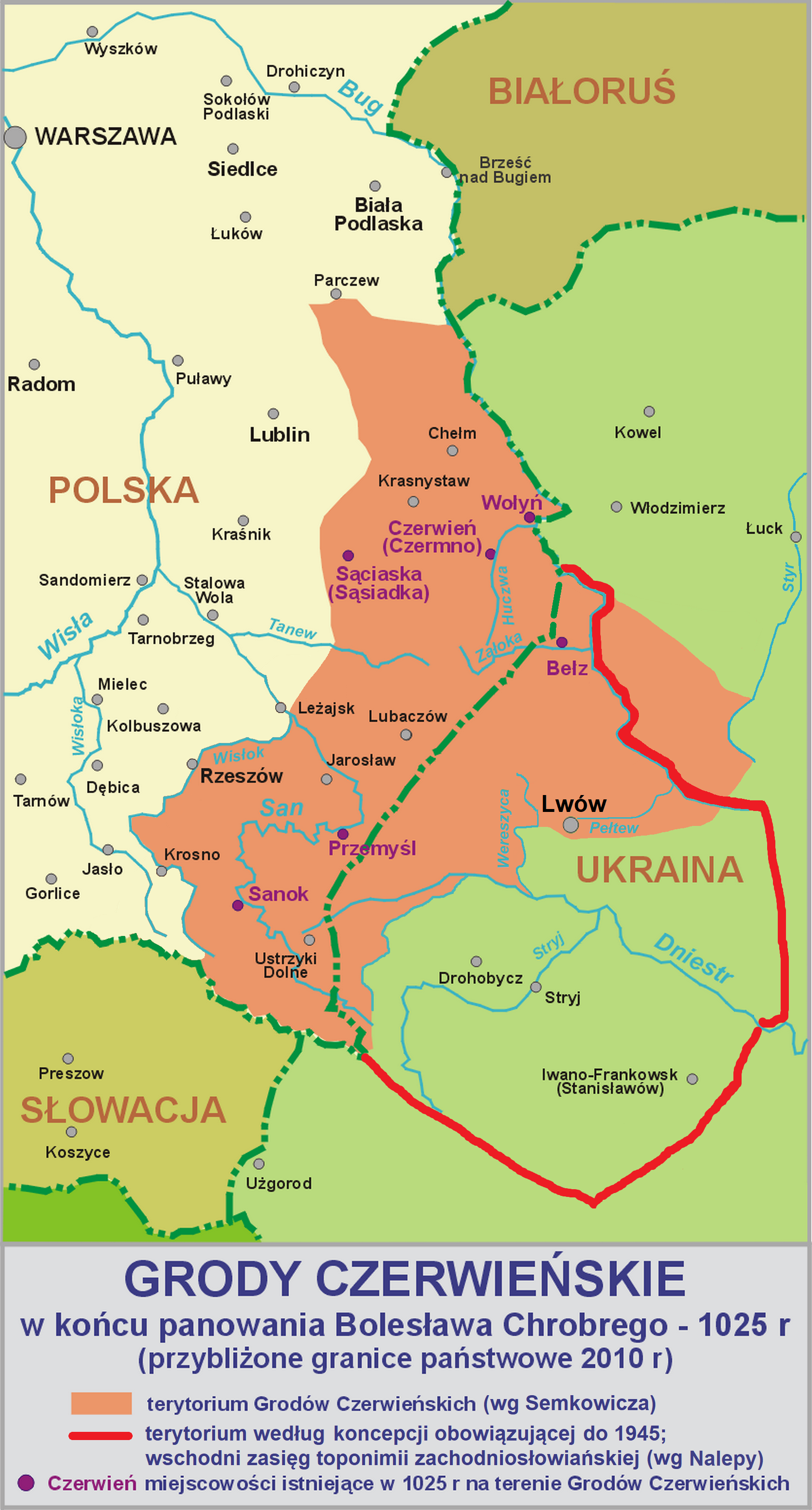
Cherven Gords in 1025 AD, under the rule of Bolesław I the Brave of Poland, superimposed over contemporary boundaries

The Cherven Cities, Cherven Towns, Cherven Forts or Cherven Gords (Polish: Grody Czerwieńskie, Ukrainian: Червенські Городи), often styled "Red Cities", "Red Forts" or "Red Boroughs", was a point of dispute between the Kingdom of Poland and Kievan Rus' at the turn of the 10th and 11th centuries, with both sides claiming their rights to the land. Named after the principal fortification of Cherven, possibly Czerwień on the site of the present-day village of Czermno.

== Etymology ==
The Cherven gords (Old East Slavic Grady chervenske, Ukrainian Chervenski horody, Polish Grody czerwieńskie) are named after the gord of Cherven, the region's main town. Its name is derived from the Slavic word for "worm" (pronounced "cherv") referring to larvae of the insect Porphyrophora polonica used to produce a valued red dye for export to Byzantium.. However, it was interpreted to mean "red" (also pronounced "cherven" in Slavic), which lead to the frequent misnomer of the Cherven towns as "Red Towns" or "Red Cities" and the surrounding region "Red Russia" or "Red Ruthenia" - in Latin Russia rubra, Polish Ruś czerwona, German Rotburgenland (cf. Proto-Slavic *čьrvenъ "red"). The first mention of the "Cherven Cities" is given by the Primary Chronicle , when Vladimir the Great captured them from the Lyakhs (Poles and Lendians) in 981.

== Location ==
The territorial extent of the region is not entirely clear. Written sources mention only the strongholds of Przemyśl and Cherven; the latter has been identified by historians as the gord adjacent to the village of Czermno (in Tomaszów Lubelski County of Lublin Voivodeship), in easternmost Poland. Originally, the name probably identified a territory between the Bug and Wieprz rivers. It lay to the west of the Bug River, and to the east of the Kraków region (later the Principality of Lesser Poland); it may have included the lands of Chełm, too. The earlies mention names Czerwień and Przemyśl, specifically.

In a broader estimate (in the Russian Wikipedia article), the Cherven Towns are thought to have included also the following towns and regions: Czermno, Gródek (near Hrubieszów), Volhynia, Chełm, Bełz, Jarosław, Sąsiadka, Uhrusk, Krasnystaw, Stołpie, Wereszczyn, Włodawa, Rzeszów, Lubaczów, Horodło, and Krosno.

== History ==
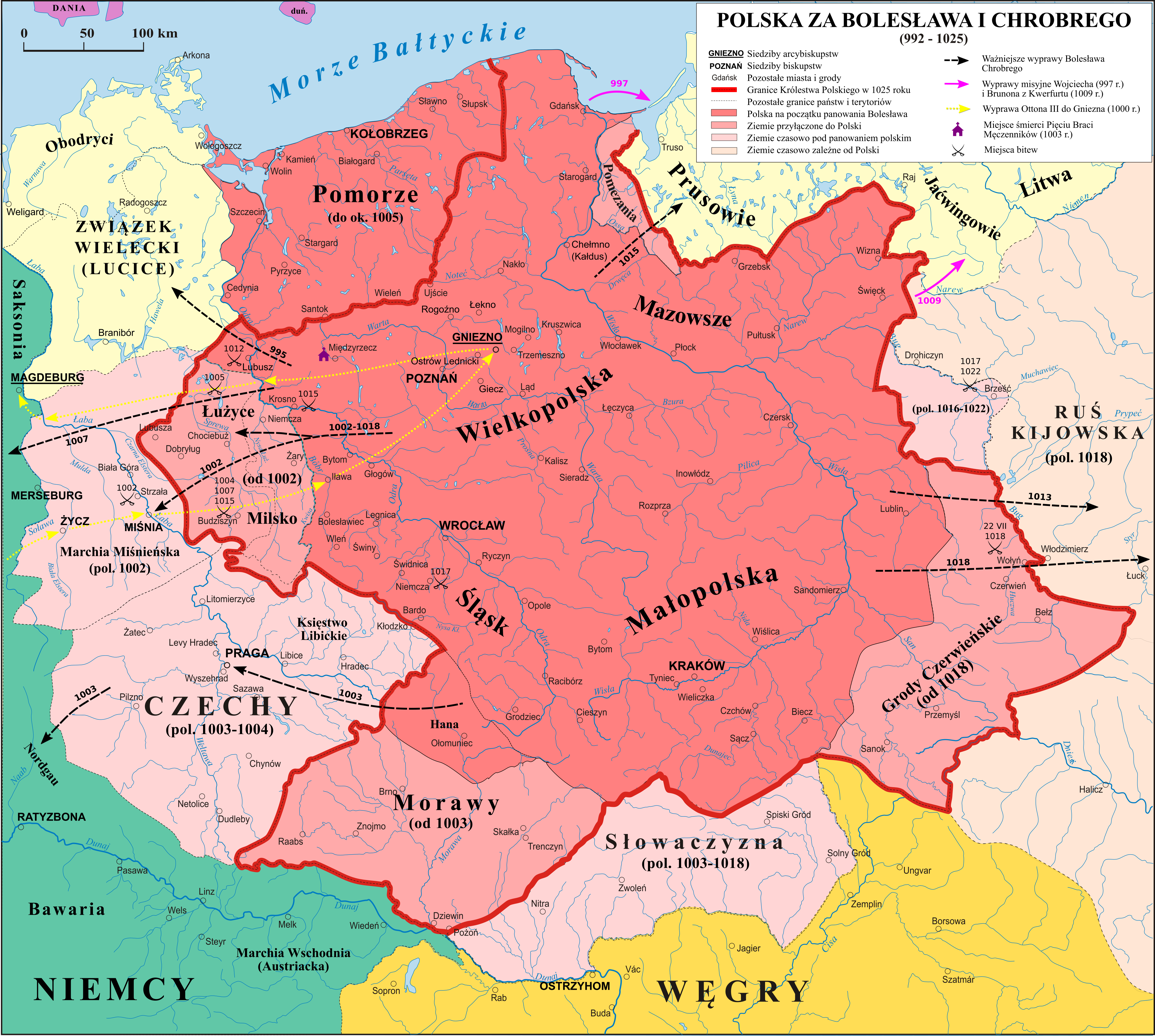
Poland (992–1025); area within dark red color represents the borders at the end of the rule of Mieszko I (992); dark red border comprises the area at the end of the reign of Bolesław I (1025)

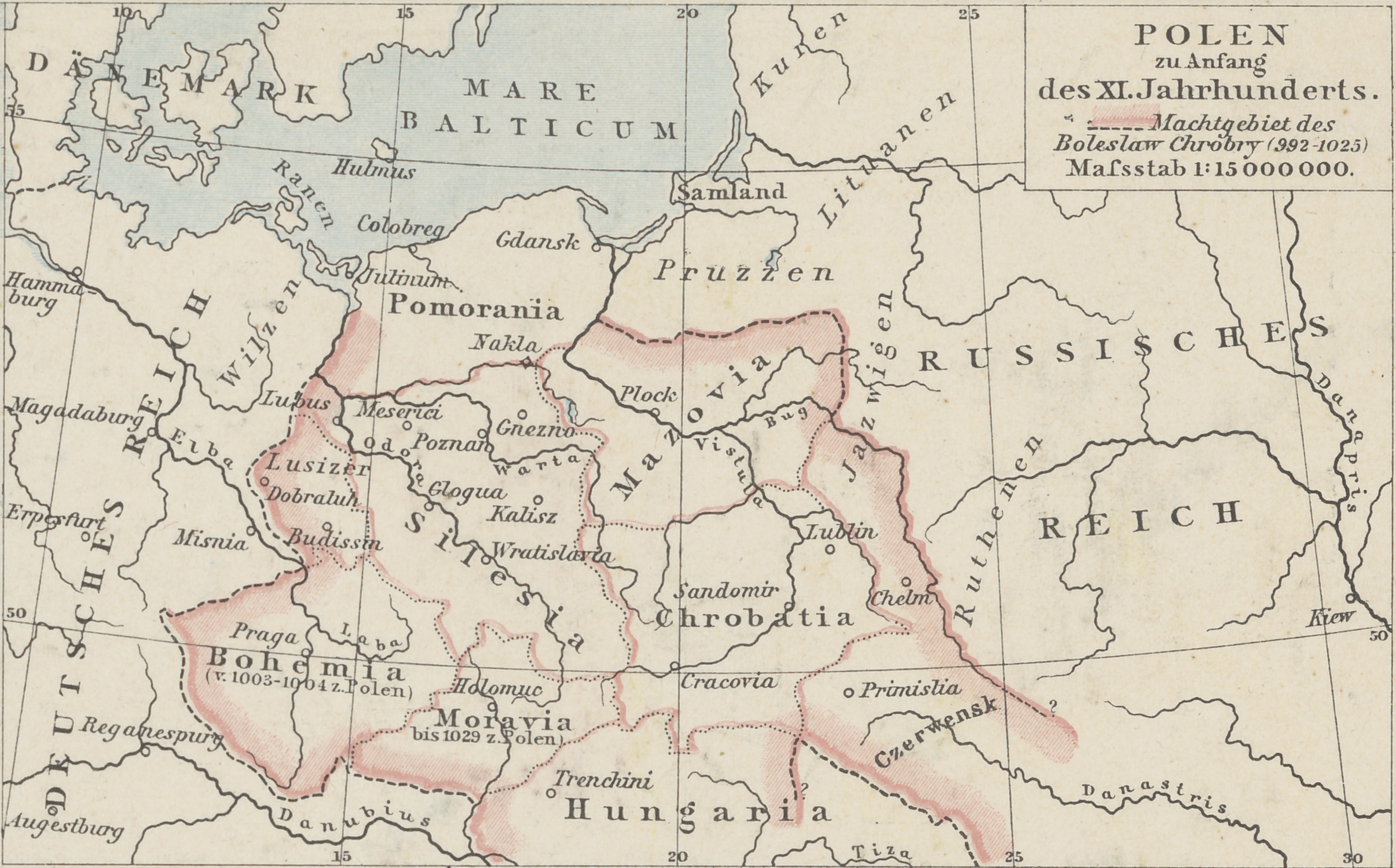
Allgemeiner historischer Handatlas (1886) depicting Poland in 1025 — Cherven (Czerwensk) region located in the lower-right corner

The Cherven Cities first described in the Primary Chronicle by Nestor the Chronicler (12th century) have a central role in the history of the Early Medieval Polish-Ruthenian borderlands. The area is first mentioned in 981, when Vladimir the Great took it during his expansion campaign to the west, saying "he took Przemyśl, Cherven and the other towns, still named Rus, today." The second mention is in the section about 1018, when the region was conquered by the Polish prince Boleslav the Brave; the third mention is when, in 1031, it was reconquered by the Kievan prince Yaroslav the Wise.

Whether these settlements were inhabited by a West Slavic or East Slavic tribe, and whether they were independent from both Poland and Kievan Rus', is part of a wider ethnographic dispute between Polish and Ukrainian-Russian historiographies.

Cosmas of Prague (c. 1045 – 1125) relates that the Přemyslid rulers of Bohemia controlled the land of Kraków until 999. In support of Cosmas, the foundation charter of the Archdiocese of Prague (1086) traces the Eastern border of the archdiocese, as established in 973, along the Bug and Styr (or Stryi) rivers, which marked the approximate boundaries of the region where Cherven Cities were located. Abraham ben Jacob, who travelled in Eastern Europe in 965, remarks that Boleslaus II of Bohemia ruled the country "stretching from the city of Prague to the city of Kraków".

In the 970s, it is assumed that Mieszko I of Poland took over the region: the Primary Chronicle infers this when reporting that Vladimir the Great conquered the Cherven Cities from the Lyakhs (an alternative archaic name for Poles) in 981. Nestor writes in his chronicle that: "Vladimir marched upon the Lyakhs and took their cities: Peremyshl (Przemyśl), Cherven (Czermno), and other towns, all of which are subject to Rus' even to this day". There's a scholarly dispute whether Przemyśl was one of tribal centers of the Lendians or Croats. Historian Leontii Voitovych speculates that contrary to Nestor's account in the Primary Chronicle, if the lands were under control of the Duchy of Poland then the Kievan Rus' conquest would have been an open call for war between the principalities with an inevitable long struggle, but such a thing did not happen according to Voitovych, possibly indicating in Voitovych's view that the lands and its population were not Polish, but an independent political-tribal union with some vassalage to Bohemia. However, a long struggle did ensue and the Cherven Cities changed possession between Poland and Rus in 1018, 1031, 1069, and 1085.

In 1018, Poland re-took the area under Bolesław I the Brave, and in 1031 it fell again to Rus'. The Rus'ian expedition against Poland (1030–1031) had as its object not only the recovery of territories previously lost in 1018; it also delivered a powerful blow against the Polish Metropolis of Slavonic rite. In 1031, Harald and his men reached the land of the Kievan Rus, where they served the armies of Yaroslav I the Wise, the Grand Prince of the Rus, whose wife Ingigerd was a distant relative of Harald. In the spring 1031, where he became chief of Yaroslav's bodyguard jointly with Eilifr, son of that Rognvaldr who had originally come to Novgorod with Ingigerd. Harald served a military apprenticeship, fighting in the Polish campaign of 1031, and against the Læsir (Lendians). The gord of Sutiejsk was most likely founded in 1034 - 1039 by Grand Prince Yaroslav the Wise, who built the fortified settlement to guard the border with Poland. Around the year 1069, the region again returned to Poland, after Bolesław II the Generous retook the area and the city of Przemyśl, making it his temporary residence. Then in 1085, the region became a principality under the lordship of Rus', known as the Principality of Peremyshl.

In 1240, the region was conquered by the Golden Horde. The last year when the "Cherven Cities" appear in written sources is 1289.

In 1340, King Casimir III the Great acquired the territory for the Kingdom of Poland. From the 15th century on, the term "Red Ruś'" ("Red Ruthenia", or "Red Russia"), derived from the misinterpreted name of the Cherven Towns as Red Towns, was used for the territory of the new Ruthenian Voivodeship, which encompassed the Chełm and Przemyśl regions, as well as the Lviv and Halych regions.

== See also ==
- Czerwień
- Lędzianie
- Red Ruthenia
- Sutiejsk
