= Sąsiadka =

- Village
- Location within Poland
- Coordinates: 50°44′35″N 22°53′30″E
- Country: Poland
- Voivodeship: Lublin
- County: Zamość
- Gmina: Sułów
- Population: 500
- Website: http://www.sasiadka.info

Sąsiadka [sɔ̃ˈɕatka] is a village in the administrative district of Gmina Sułów, within Zamość County, Lublin Voivodeship, in eastern Poland. The village is known chiefly as the site of the prized military settlement of Sutiejsk which existed here between the 11th and 13th century CE.

== Archaeological excavations of Sutiejsk ==
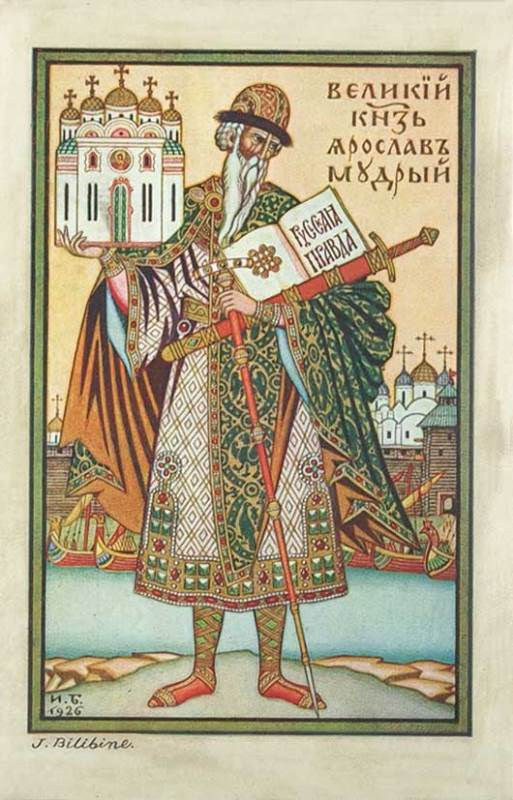
Sutiejsk was likely founded by Yaroslav the Wise in the 1030s.

Currently Sąsiadka is a small village, located at the edge of the Roztocze, but its history is very long, dating back to the early Middle Ages. Next to contemporary village lies an ancient Slavic gord, which was one of the most important administrative centers of the so-called “Cherven Towns” (“Grody Czerwieńskie”), a historic region between Poland and Rus’.

Due to extensive archaeological research, which began in 1936, the gord of Sąsiadka is one of the most thoroughly investigated of all such locales in eastern Poland. According to archaeologists, Sąsiadka was completely destroyed three times. Each time a new gord was established on the ruins of the previous one.

=== History ===
The gord was most likely founded by Grand Prince Yaroslav the Wise, who built the fortified settlement in 1034 - 1039 to guard the border with Poland. In 1069, Sutiejsk was captured by Bolesław II Śmiały, during his raid over Rus’. The gord was burned, and quickly rebuilt by Poles, who controlled it until the late 11th century. Sutiejsk was a very important trade and administrative center, with several meetings of Polish and Rus dukes taking place here.

Some time between 1086 and 1097, Poles returned the gord to the Volhynian Duke Dawid Igorewicz, who visited it several times, as archaeologists found five lead seals with his name on them. Polish rulers remained keenly interested in Sutiejsk, and in 1121, Bolesław Krzywousty captured it during his raid over Volhynia and Ruthenia. Sutiejsk was once again destroyed and rebuilt, and used as a military base for further Polish raids. At that time, its total area was 21 hectares, divided into three parts, with a walled center, the seat of a local duke. Three rings of ramparts, which protected the gord, were up to six meters high, and several hundred meters in circumference.

=== Destruction ===
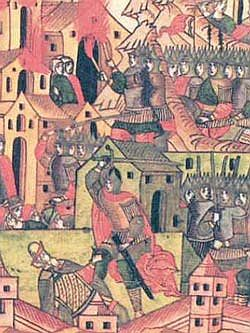
The Mongol army captures a Rus' city

Sutiejsk was again destroyed in 1205, when Roman, Duke of Volodymyr, raided Polish-controlled territories. The gord was rebuilt, but in 1241, during the Mongol invasion of Poland, it was probably burned to the ground, never to be rebuilt. By that time the East - West trade route to Sandomierz which went through Sutiejsk had lost its importance, having been replaced by a different path from Kraków to Przemyśl and Lwów/Lviv in the 13th century.

The village of Sąsiadka was private property from 1605 until 1944 as part of the Zamoyski Family Fee Tail.
