= Czerwień =

Early medieval Slavic Settlement in Poland

Coordinates: 50.65946°N 23.70910°E

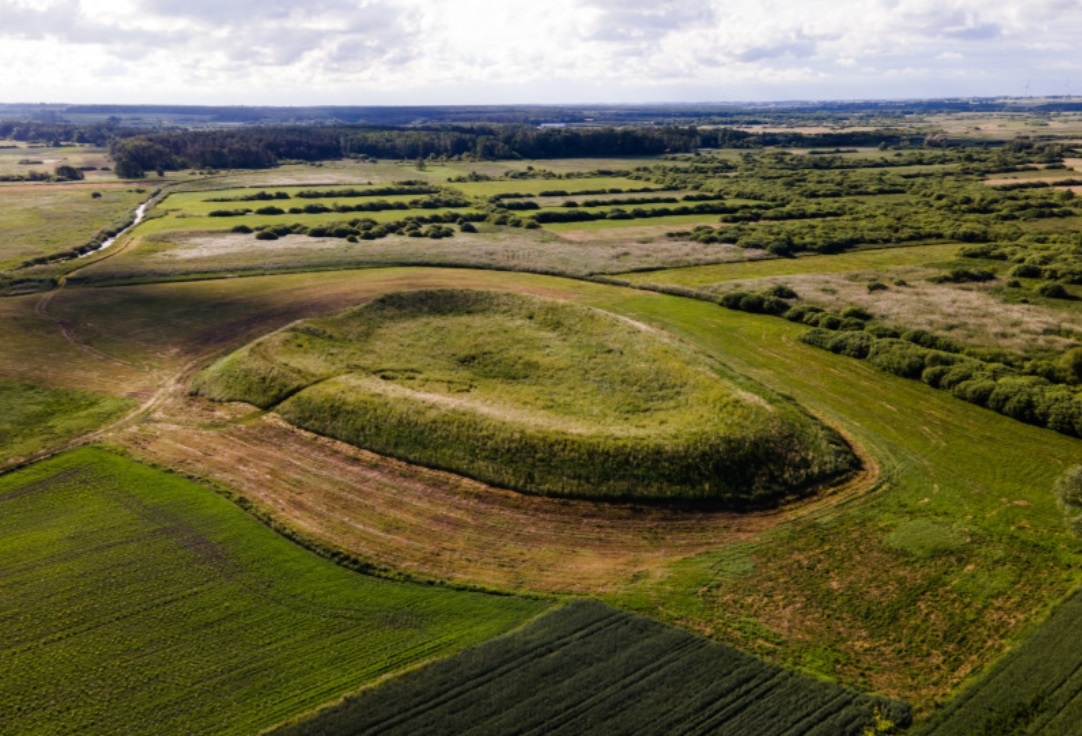
The gord near Czermno identified as Czerwień

Czerwień (Note: Polish pronunciation in IPA: /ˈt͡ʂɛr.vjɛɲ/), also spelled Cherven or Červen, was an early medieval Slavic settlement (gord) at the modern village of Czermno near Tyszowce in Eastern Poland, close to the border with Ukraine. In the early Middle Ages, the town was the administrative centre of the so-called Cherven Cities (Czerwień Gords), a region located in what is now eastern Poland and western Ukraine, that came to be part of later Red Ruthenia in Galicia (Eastern Europe). The Cherven town was destroyed by a Tartar raid in the 13th century, never to be rebuilt; the last mention in written sources is from the year 1289. Its role as the local administrative centre was taken over by the town of Bełz.

== Name ==
The gord is called Червенъ ("Cherven") in the Old East Slavic of the Primary Chronicle, and Czerwień is the spelling in modern Polish. The name is derived from the Slavic word for "worm" (черв, pronounced "cherv"), referring to larvae of the insect Polish cochineal (also called Polish carmine scales) used to produce a valued red dye, likely exported through here to Byzantium. The name has been misunderstood to mean "red" (червен, "cherven" in Slavic) as the color of the town, which has led to the frequent misnomer of the Cherven towns as "Red Towns" or "Red Cities" and the term "Red Russia" (Russia rubra in Latin) that appeared since the 14th century.

== Location ==
It has been identified by historians and archaeologists as the gord adjacent to the village of Czermno (in Tomaszów Lubelski County of Lublin Voivodeship), in easternmost Poland, close to the border of Ukraine.

== History ==
The gord of Cherven is mentioned in the Primary Chronicle (12th century AD) three times: First in the record about the year 981, when the forts of Cherven and Przemyśl were conquered by the Kievan prince Vladimir I (Note: [6489 (981)] Иде [Володимеръ] Е к Лѧхомъ и заӕ градъı их̑ Перемъıшль Червенъ и инъı градъı, єже суть и до сего дн҃е подъ Русью. (Rough translation: "[Vladimir] went to the Poles/Lędzians and seized their gords Peremyshl, Cherven and other gords, which are till now under Rus'.")); then in 1018, the region was conquered by the Polish prince Boleslav the Brave; then, in 1031, it was reconquered by the Kievan prince Yaroslav the Wise.

Subsequently, the region fell under various principalities of Kievan Rus', such as the Principality of Volhynia, the Principality of Peremyshl, and—from 1198—the Principality of Galicia-Volhynia.

In 1240, the region was conquered by the Golden Horde. The Cherven towns appear in written sources for the last time in 1289.

== Archaeology ==
The central component of the fortified complex at Czermno is a hillfort known as "Zamczysko", which covers an area of up to 150 hectares. Its outer wards are situated in areas referred to as the "Nearer Outer Bailey" (west of the main stronghold) and the "Further Outer Bailey" (northwest of it). The complex is complemented by other settlements and burial sites in the immediate vicinity. The site has been the subject of repeated archaeological investigations from the 1950s to the present day. Dendrochronological data obtained from parts of the structures indicate that the bridges here remained in use as late as the 13th century.

However, data derived from dendrochronology of the rampart's construction present certain complications: it was built using logs felled toward the end of the first half of the 11th century—or even later—which would imply that this hillfort cannot be associated with the dates and events recorded in the Primary Chronicle. It is possible, however, that the samples collected originated from timber used during later repairs to the fortifications.

Professional research has yielded thousands of artifacts. These include, for example, religious objects, clothing components, lead seals, enkolpia, small crosses, axes, arrowheads, grzywnas, and clothing pendants. In addition to metal objects, discoveries include glass bracelets, spindle whorls, a ceramic gaming piece, and a comb. Two hoards of Byzantine jewelry, deposited on the acropolis between the mid-13th and mid-14th centuries, are of fundamental importance. In academic literature, these finds are frequently associated with the period of the Mongol invasion. Lead seals, dating from the 11th to the 13th century, were used by Ruthenian princes; the so-called Drohiczyn seals, meanwhile, likely served merchants. Most of these seals were discovered in the outer baileys rather than within the fortified settlements themselves.

== Interpretation ==
In the Middle Ages, the border region between Poland and Kievan Rus' essentially constituted the interface between the Latin (Catholic) and Byzantine (Orthodox) Europe. Overall, it can be stated that the majority of the finds possess a "Ruthenian cultural character." Nevertheless, it cannot be claimed that the middle Bug region was Rus' in the early Middle Ages. Determining ethnicity based on archaeological evidence is generally difficult. In the northern part of the Slavic world, up until the 10th century, it is impossible to distinguish between West Slavic and East Slavic cultures based on burial rites. Distinctions only begin to emerge in the later phase of this period, when the Christianization of both Slavic groups commenced—driven by the differing influences of Christianity: from Constantinople upon Kievan Rus', and from Rome upon Poland.

== Land of Czerwień squadron ==
In addition to being the name of an ancient settlement, long since destroyed, in World War II, "Land of Czerwień" (Polish: Ziemia Czerwieńska) was the name of one of the Polish Air Force in exile's unit, the No. 309 (Land of Czerwień) Squadron.

== See also ==
- Chełm Land
