= Klement of Ruszcza =

Polish nobleman and Voivode of Kraków

- Voivode

Voivode of Kraków
- Reign: 1241, 1243-1252
- Predecessor: Włodzimierz of Cracow
- Successor: Klemens Latoszyński
- Born: c. 1190
- Died: 1256
- Noble family: Świebodzice
- Spouse: ?
- Issue: Wierzbięta z Ruszczy; 1 other
- Father: Sulisław of Cracow
- Mother: ?

Klement of Ruszcza (Polish: Klemens z Ruszczy, Klemens Ruszczaski) was a Polish nobleman and Voivode of Kraków in 1241 and from 1243 to 1252.

== Life ==
Klement was born to Sulisław from the Gryfici (Świebodzice) noble family in the House of Griffins. After the Wendish Crusade, the Mongol invasion of Europe and the subsequent German colonisation of Silesia, the Gryfici (Świebodzice) clan lost most of their possessions in White Serbia, Duchy of Kopanica, Branibor and Lower Silesia. The Germanised Pomeranian branch of the family became known as House of Griffins.

In 1228 he obtained rights to the village of Lutowice, Zagórze (Sosnowiec), Zator, and Woźniki. Klement founded a settlement on the river Koprzywianka which he named Klimontów, after himself and another site Klimontów (Sosnowiec) next to Zagórze and Będzin. For a time he was Castellan of Kraków.

In March 1241 he succeeded his uncle as Voivode of Kraków after the death of Włodzimierz at the Battle of Chmielnik. Kraków was sacked a week later by an army of the Mongol empire during their first invasion of Poland, culminating in the Battle of Legnica where his father Sulisław and most of the Polish high nobility, including Henry II the Pious, were killed. The new Duke of Poland Bolesław II Rogatka, successor to Henry II, confirmed his post as Voivode. Konrad Mazowiecki, the Duke of Masovia, attacked Kraków the same year and Klement and the Cracovians were left to defend Kraków alone without help from the Silesian princes, which they abandoned in July in favor of Skała. A few months later the fortress of Skała fell to Konrad and Klement capitulated and fled to Hungary.

He returned to Lesser Poland in 1243 with Hungarian troops, incl. members of the Sarmatian Zych (Záh) clan, with the aim of putting Bolesław Wstydliwy on the throne of Kraków. His army gathered other Polish knights who advocated for the placement of Bolesław and together they clashed with the army of Konrad and the Masovians at the Battle of Suchodoł in May 1243. After this victory Bolesław took control of Kraków, a move supported by Bishop Jan Prandota. Klement rebuilt the Będzin Castle (near Zagórze and Klimontów) and a Zych garrison protecting the silver mines of Rosperk was placed at nearby Zychcych (Żychcice).

Because of his successes Klement's previous position as Voivode was restored to him. In 1252 he received a privilege from Bolesław Wstydliwy, releasing him and his descendants from all levies and burdens for the benefit of the ruling house, moreover the right of trial and the privilege of building castles and serving other princes.

He died in 1256.

== Literature ==
- A. Małecki, Studya heraldyczne, t. II, Lwów 1890, s. 54-56.
- L. M. Wójcik, Ród Gryfitów do końca XIII wieku. Pochodzenie – genealogia – rozsiedlenie, „Historia” CVII, Wrocław 1993, s. 64-67.
