= Klemens of Brzeźnica =

Polish nobleman (c. 1190 – 1241)

Voivode of Opole and Castellan of Kraków
- Reign: 1225–1230 (Opole); 1230–1241 (Kraków)
- Native name: Klemens z Brzeźnicy
- Born: c. 1190
- Died: 18 March 1241; Chmielnik, Poland
- Buried: Staniątki
- Noble family: Gryfici (Świebodzice)
- Spouse: Racława
- Issue: Wizenna
- Father: Klemens, castellan of Płock

Klemens of Brzeźnica (Polish: Klemens z Brzeźnicy, also known as Klemens Klimontowic or Klemens Gryfita; c. 1190 – 18 March 1241) was a Polish nobleman from the Gryfici (Świebodzice) family who served as voivode of Opole and later as castellan of Kraków. He was killed on 18 March 1241 at the Battle of Chmielnik while fighting against the Mongol invasion of Poland.

== Life ==
Klemens was born into the powerful Gryfici (Świebodzice) clan. Medieval genealogical tradition and modern scholarship identify him as a son of Klemens, castellan of Płock, and brother of, among others, bishop Andrzej of Brzeźnica of Płock. Members of the family played a leading role in the politics of Lesser Poland in the late 12th and early 13th centuries.

After the intensification of conflicts over the Kraków throne in the 1220s, particularly the struggle between Henry the Bearded and Leszek the White, part of the Gryfici lost their position in Lesser Poland. Klemens is reported to have left the region and entered the service of Casimir I of Opole in the Duchy of Opole and Racibórz. By the late 1220s he is attested as voivode of Opole, and through his marriage to Racława he became related to the local magnate Zbrosław, castellan of Opole.

Around 1230 Klemens returned to Lesser Poland and was appointed castellan of Kraków. He held one of the most important offices in the fragmented kingdom, responsible for the defence and administration of Kraków and its royal stronghold at Wawel. During the struggles for control of Kraków he supported the political line of his kin and took part in the defence of Kraków, Wawel and the nearby stronghold at Skała against the forces of Duke Konrad I of Masovia. He remained castellan until his death in 1241.

Klemens was also an important founder and patron of religious houses. As castellan of Kraków he founded the Cistercian convent at Łubnice on the Prosna river between 1239 and 1241, endowing it with several villages drawn from his estates. He is likewise regarded as the founder, together with his wife Racława, of the Benedictine nunnery at Staniątki near Kraków, where their daughter Wyszeniega (Wizenna) became the first abbess. According to Jan Długosz’s account as interpreted by modern historians, Klemens and his wife Racława were buried in separate tombs in the sacristy of the Benedictine church at Staniątki, the family foundation.

On 18 March 1241 Klemens took part in the Battle of Chmielnik against a Mongol army advancing through Lesser Poland. Serving as castellan of Kraków, he fought alongside Włodzimierz of Cracow, voivode of Kraków, and Pakosław of Sandomierz, voivode of Sandomierz. The Polish forces were defeated and Klemens was killed in the fighting.
