= Poland (novel) =

Novel by James A. Michener

- First edition cover
- Author: James Michener
- Language: English
- Genre: Historical novel
- Publisher: Random House
- Publication date: 1983
- Publication place: United States
- Media type: Print (hardback)
- Pages: 556pp.
- ISBN: 0-394-53189-2

Poland is a historical novel written by James A. Michener and published in 1983 detailing the times and tribulations of three interconnected Polish families (the Lubonski family, the Bukowski family, and the Buk family) across eight centuries, ending in the then-present day (1981). The Lubonski family is one of the princely houses of Poland, its wealthy patriarchs generally ruling over their region; the Bukowski family are petty nobles, with a well-known and respected name but typically little money; and the Buk family are impoverished peasants. Despite their drastically different social standings, members of the families interact frequently throughout the generations, sometimes as allies and sometimes as adversaries.

== Overview ==
Michener was hired by a television company to travel to a foreign country to shoot a documentary. He was offered support to go anywhere in the world and Michener decided to make the trip to Poland. Following this, Michener made several trips back to Poland and conducted extensive study of Poland's history and culture. He began writing the book in 1979 and it was published four years later.

Like Michener's other works, he includes an acknowledgments section at the beginning of the book; however due to the political turmoil in Poland at the time, Michener decided not to include the names of the people he traveled with for fear of persecutions against them. He writes: "Normally, as I have done in my other novels, I would list their names, their impressive occupations, their achievements in research and scholarship, but I cannot ascertain whether in the present climate this would hurt or help them."

== Chapter summary ==
The book, written in an episodic format, tells the story of three families and the many generations of each family throughout the history of Poland. The three families (Buk, Bukowski and Lubonski) are fictional, as are the other characters and the ancestral home of all the families, Bukowo, where much of the action takes place. The plot, however, takes place throughout the history of Poland and mentions many historic people. The events are largely real events in which the fictional characters interact. The book spans over seven hundred years.

The book starts with an acknowledgements section, maps of the location of the plot, an explanation of which characters are fictional as opposed to which ones are historical, and a description of the hierarchy of Polish society.

1. Buk versus Bukowski: Present day (1981). In the village of Bukowo, the fictional Minister of Agriculture of communist Poland, Szymon Bukowski, meets with the leader of the farmers, Janko Buk, to discuss the problems of agriculture and the possibility of forming a farmers' union in Poland (an analogue for the contemporary Solidarity movement). Both having roots in the small town, the two come into the meeting vaguely aware that they may be related, but are unsure of how until they discuss their relationships to a local woman who was killed 40 years earlier by the occupying Nazis. This historic meeting draws media attention from the United States, Japan, Russia and Western Europe.
2. From the East: Invasion by Tatars in the years 1240 to 1241. This chapter tells the story of the historic Mongol invasion of Poland, the battle of Tursko, the Siege of Kraków and the Battle of Legnica. We meet the earliest ancestors of the modern-day characters in the first chapter, who have not yet acquired their family names, in addition to Krzysztof, a knight of modest means who will become the forefather of the novel's powerful Lubonski family.
3. From the West: Occupation by the Teutonic Knights in the late fourteenth century and the Battle of Grunwald.
4. From the North: Invasion by Sweden and the Polish–Swedish wars taking place during the seventeenth century. This chapter describes the downfall of the Polish–Lithuanian Commonwealth during the Deluge. In the aftermath, having lost his wife in the violence, the Bukowo magnate Cyprjan buys an estate in the village of Lubon and marries its widowed owner; the pope then awards him the noble title of count in recognition of his defense of Polish Catholicism against the invaders, and for the remainder of the novel, his descendants are known to all as Count Lubonski.
5. From the South: Invasion by Ottoman Empire (Battle of Vienna). This chapter tells the story of the Polish–Lithuanian Commonwealth and the Battle of Vienna. It takes place in the late seventeenth century. Following the battle the minor aristocrat Lukasz acquires the family name Bukowski.
6. The Golden Freedom: This chapter takes place in the eighteenth century. It discusses Polish politics in the late eighteenth century (see liberum veto, Sejm) and different political figures from that time. The novel depicts the partitioning of Poland and the subsequent Kościuszko Uprising. During this chapter, the peasant family whose patriarchs have often been associated with the beech (in Polish, buk) trees of the area becomes formally known as Buk.
7. Mazurka: This chapter, which is set in Vienna at the height of the Habsburg monarchy, discusses the life of Polish exiles during the partition period. It takes place at the end of the 19th century.
8. Shattered Dreams: This chapter takes place in the beginning of the twentieth century after the Reconstitution of Poland. The chapter ends with the Russian Communists' defeat at the Battle of Komarów, or the Battle of Zamość, in 1920.
9. The Terror: Invasion and occupation by the Nazis during World War II, including the Holocaust in Poland; and the subsequent Soviet occupation. Much attention is devoted to the Polish resistance movement in World War II, including the Leśni (foresters).
10. Bukowski versus Buk: The novel picks up where it left off in chapter one back in the present day (1981). The chapter title represents the shift in power in the negotiations (from "Buk vs. Bukowski" to "Bukowski vs. Buk").

== Bukowo phrase ==
1. "A Pole is a man born with a sword in his right hand, a brick in his left. When the battle is over, he starts to rebuild."

== Reception ==
Poland received mostly favorable reviews and was #1 on the New York Times bestseller list.
