= Sack of Kraków (1241) =

Battle of the first Mongol invasion of Poland

- Part of the first Mongol invasion of Poland
Date	22/28 March 1241
Location	Kraków, Poland
Result	Capture and destruction of most of the city

Belligerents
Mongol Empire	Kingdom of Poland

Commanders and leaders
Unknown	Klement of Ruszcza

The sack of Kraków during the first Mongol invasion of Poland took place on either 22 or 28 March 1241. It ended in the victory of the Mongol forces, who captured the city and burned it, massacring most of its residents.

== Background ==
In early February 1241, some ten thousand Mongol warriors concentrated near Wlodzimierz Wolynski, and entered Lesser Poland. The invaders captured Lublin and Zawichost, reaching Sandomierz on 13 February. The Polish army under voivode Włodzimierz Gryf was defeated in the Battle of Tursk and the Battle of Chmielnik. The latter victory meant that the way to Kraków was opened. When news of Polish losses reached the city, its residents fled in panic to Silesia, Bohemia and Germany. Also, local peasants abandoned the villages, hiding in forests, swamps and other places.

== The Sack ==
The Mongols probably entered Kraków on 22 March 1241. The city itself was not defended. Those residents who had not fled, decided to hide in churches and on the fortified Wawel Hill. According to a popular-20th century legend, a Polish sentry on a tower of St. Mary's Church sounded the alarm by playing the Hejnał, and the city gates were closed before the Mongols could ambush. The trumpeter, however, was shot in the throat by a Tatar marksman and did not complete the anthem.

The invaders stayed in the city for ten days, and their stay resulted in the almost complete destruction of Kraków. The Mongols failed to capture the Wawel Hill or St. Andrew's Church, the only church in Kraków to withstand the attack. On 31 March 1241 the Mongols set Kraków on fire; the next day they left the city, heading towards Silesia.

== Sources ==
- Tomislaw Giergiel, Tatarzy w Sandomierzu
- Piastowie. Leksykon biograficzny, wyd. 1999, str. 397
- Wielka Historia Polski cz. do 1320, wyd. Pinexx 1999, s. 187–188
- Stanislaw Krakowski, Polska w walce z najazdami tatarskimi w XIII wieku, wyd. MON 1956, str.136-137
