= Battle of Tarczek =

1241 battle of the first Mongol invasion of Poland

Coordinates: 50°56′35″N 21°00′12″E

- Part of the first Mongol invasion of Poland
Date	13 February 1241
Location	Tarczek, Poland
Result	Mongol victory

Belligerents
Mongol Empire	Kingdom of Poland

Commanders and leaders
Kadan	Unknown

Strength
10,000	Unknown

Casualties and losses
Unknown	Unknown

The Battle of Tarczek took place on 13 February 1241, during the first Mongol invasion of Poland. It ended in the defeat of the Polish armies of Lesser Poland.

In March 1241, after a successful winter campaign, in which Mongol forces captured and ransacked Sandomierz, Asiatic hordes entered Poland in full force. Near Sandomierz, the Mongol forces were divided into two groups. The stronger one, probably with 15,000 warriors under Baidar and Orda Khan, headed westwards, defeating Poles in the Battle of Chmielnik on 18 March 1241. The second army, with 10,000 warriors under Kadan (according to Jan Długosz) headed northwards, to the Land of Łęczyca and Kujawy. On 19 March 1241, this army clashed with Polish knights near Tarczek. Most likely, the Polish forces which participated in the battle were knights from Lesser Poland, survivors of the Battle of Chmielnik. They were defeated, and Tarczek itself was burned to the ground.

After the battle, the Mongols ransacked central Poland for a few more days. On 1 April 1241 they appeared in Kraków, and on 8 April they reached Wrocław, where they joined the army of Baidar.

== Sources ==
- Piastowie. Leksykon biograficzny, wyd. 1999, str. 397
- Wielka Historia Polski cz. do 1320, wyd. Pinexx 1999, s. 187-188
- Stanislaw Krakowski, Polska w walce z najazdami tatarskimi w XIII wieku, wyd. MON 1956, str.136-137
