= Mikołaj Gryfita =

Voivode of Kraków and regent for Leszek the White

- Gryf coat of arms
- Born: 1059–1140
- Died: 1202
- Occupation: Voivode of Kraków
- Years active: 1176–1202
- Title: "Polish Warwick", "Kingmaker"
- Children: Klemens of Brzeźnica
- Father: Klemens from Brzeźnica

Mikołaj Gryfita (born before 1140, died 1202) was a Voivode of Kraków from 1176 to 1202, and acted as a regent from 1198 to 1199 on behalf of Prince Leszek the White.

== Early life ==
Not much is known about Gryfita's early life but he was likely born before 1140. He came from a knightly family from Lesser Poland, although his exact origins are debated. It is said that he belonged to the Gryfita-Świebodzic noble family, although Jan Długosz believed that he belonged to the Lis family. Both families were closely related (they likely had a common ancestor in the male line at a time not far from the period of Mikołaj's life) and were probably treated as one family at the time. Thus, if Gryfita was part of the Lis family, he could still be considered a member of the Gryfit family.

== Reign ==
Gryfita was considered an extraordinary figure and was said to "make crowned heads tremble before him", and also that: "he exposed princes to ridicule by arbitrarily appointing them and deposing them from the throne". During the reign of Casimir the Just in Kraków, Gryfita was appointed voivode of Kraków. After the death of Prince Casimir in 1194, Gryfita, together with the bishop of Kraków Pełka and Kazimierz's widow Helena, took over the regency on behalf of the minor Leszek the White.

=== War for Brest ===
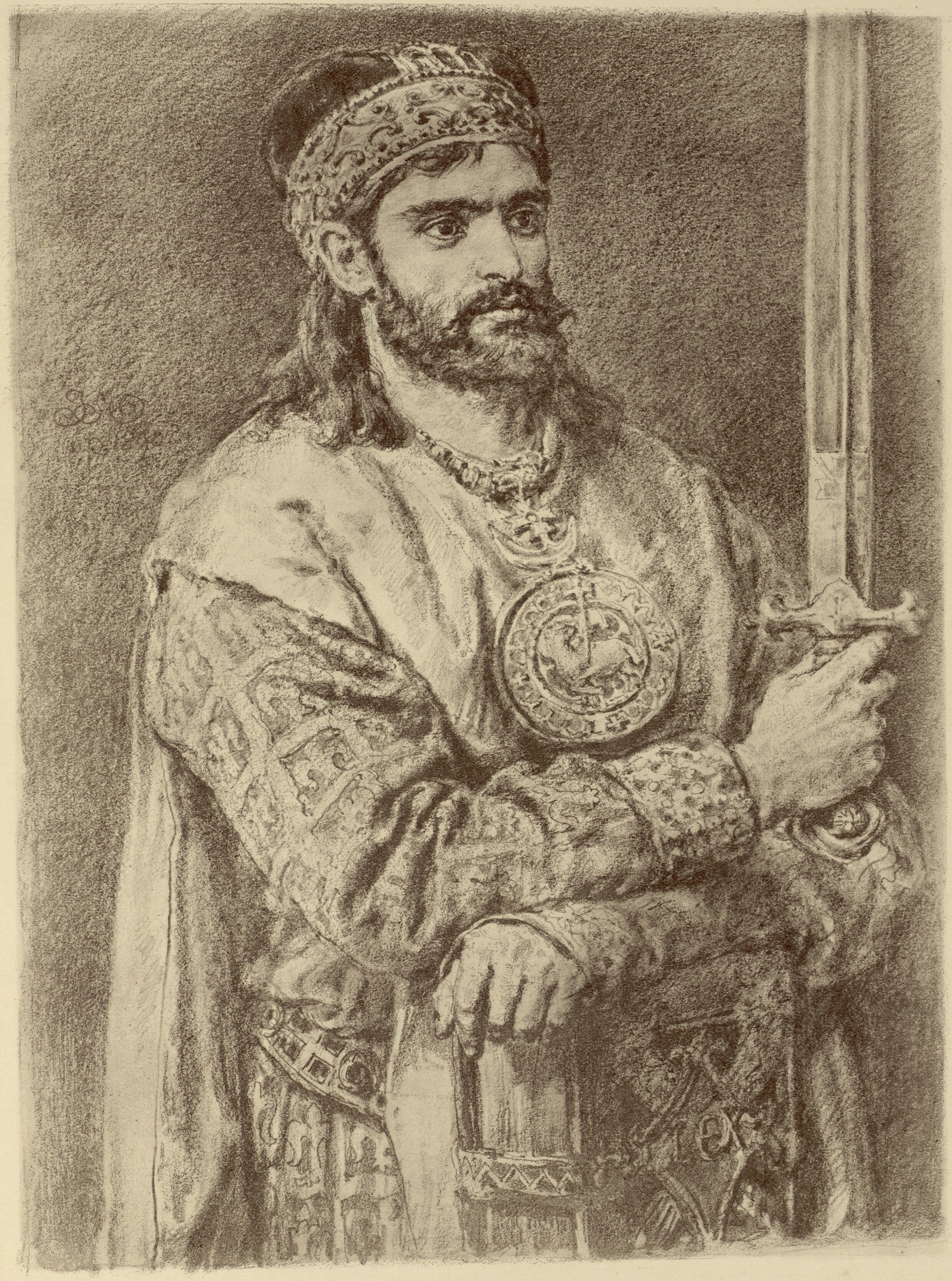
Casimir the Just

The War for Brest was started by Prince Casimir the Just along with Mikołaj Gryfita after the fall of Brest.

==== Battle of Belz ====
Casimir, not frightened by the greater scale of his enemies, gave heart to his soldiers by telling them that unmotivated slaves swelled the ranks of the Ruthenians, and thus that: "sometimes a small detachment scattered great hosts". Casimir's encouragement worked, lifting the spirits of his. He gave command of the left wing of his forces to Gryfita, while he directed the right wing himself. He then ordered the trumpeting of the commencement of battle and began the engagement with his enemies. The Ruthenians launched a fierce attack and joined what was to be a fierce battle.

On the left wing, commanded by Gryfita, the lightly armed enemy archers pierced or wounded their horses, causing the Poles to start retreating. Casimir, upon hearing of the danger, brought a detachment of troops to the left wing, driving the Rus archers away. On the right wing, the Poles, having broken and trampled the Ruthenian army, attacked the remaining Ruthenian troops, while on the left wing, the Ruthenians were scattered by Gryfita. The Ruthenians who fought against the right-wing did not hold the square as they saw others fleeing, and they also began to flee out of fear. The princes of Belz and Halych, Vsevolod and Vladimir, in order not to be captured by Casimir, exchanged horses to escape from capture. A large number of Ruthenians died in battle or were taken prisoner, along with a rich Ruthenian camp plundered by Poles on the order of Casimir.

=== Attack on Kraków and the bloodbath at Mozgawa ===
The Duke of Greater Poland, Mieszko III (the only living son of Bolesław Wrymouth), decided to remove his nephew, Leszek the White, from power to become a senior prince again. He had earlier ruled in Kraków from 1173 to 1177. After the death of Casimir the Just, he obtained the support of other Piasts, namely two Silesian princes, Mieszko IV Tanglefoot and his nephew, Jarosław of Opole.

In September 1195, they marched towards Kraków. Near Jędrzejów, he was detained by supporters of Leszek the White. A fratricidal battle took place on the Mozgawa River, which was one of the bloodiest and heaviest battles that ever took place on Polish lands during the division of the districts. Gryfita, supported by the reinforcements of the prince of Vladimir, Roman of Halych, and the voivode of Sandomierz, Goworek (who was late and joined the fighting in the second stage of this battle), fought against the troops of Mieszko the Old and his Silesian allies.

The battle was inconclusive, with Mieszko III returning to Greater Poland. He regained power in the senior district in 1198 under an agreement with Princess Helena, where Mieszko's successor on the throne of Kraków was to be Leszek the White, and not one of the sons of the Duke of Greater Poland. He died in March 1202.

The Poles no longer insulted Prince Casimir in secret but instead openly hurled insults at the Palatine and Governor of Kraków, Mikołaj Gryfita, as the perpetrator of this war. They complained that they were put in clear danger and almost given over to the Ruthenians as prey. They saw large detachments of the Ruthenian army assembled from all the Ruthenian lands, as if specifically for the doom of them. The Ruthenians were willing to fight, even asking fortune-tellers about the outcome of the war who proclaimed that everything would succeed for them and that the Poles would meet a sad end.

=== Legacy ===
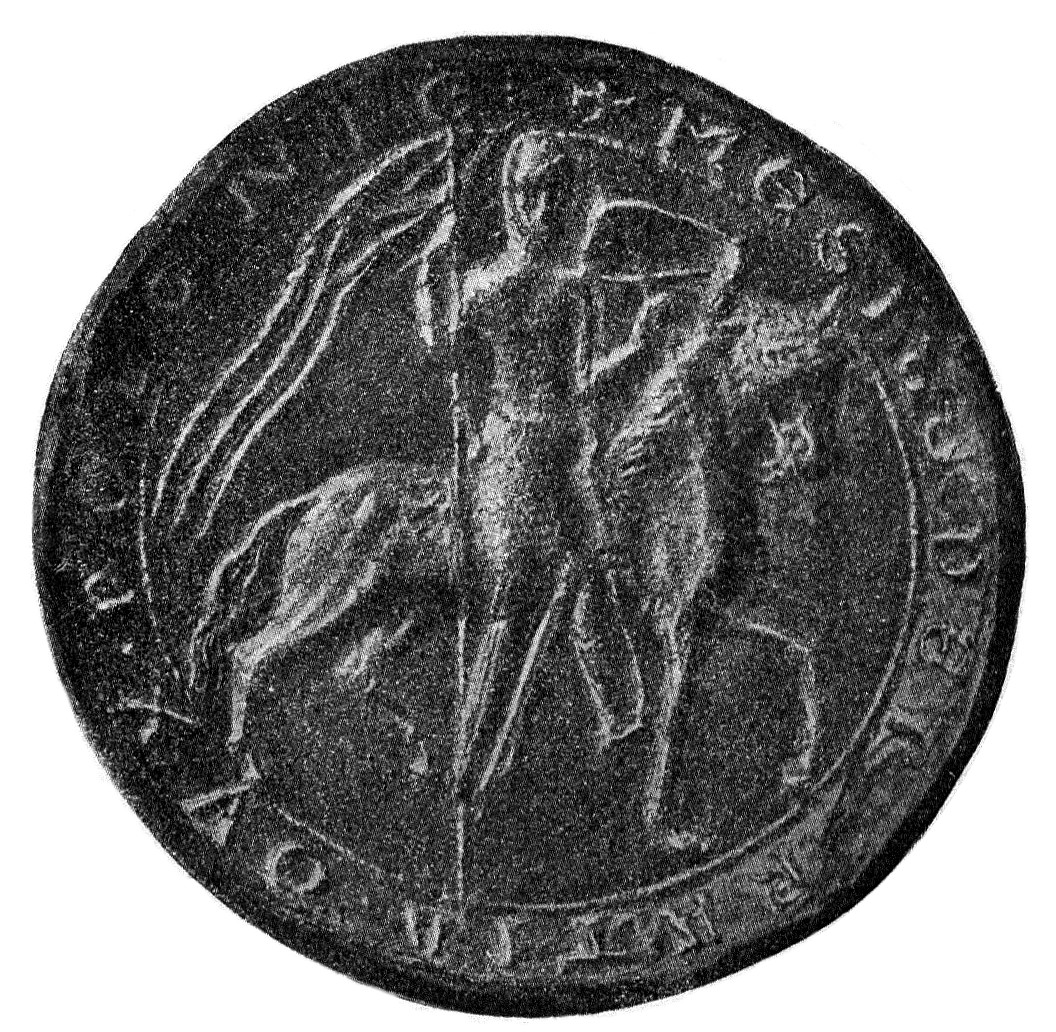
Mieszko's seal from 1145

Gryfita is considered the last of the great voivodes whose actions set the tone of the political life of that time and the only one who has been called by historians nicknames such as the "Polish Warwick" or "Kingmaker", after Richard Neville, 16th Earl of Warwick. During his time, the power of the Piast dynasty in Kraków changed at least five times and had a claim to supremacy over all of Poland. Of these princes, two lost their throne because they were unable to reach an agreement with the powerful voivode, and two were appointed by the voivode himself to take over the rule. A contemporary Kraków chronicler called him "a man of great integrity", "the first dignitary of the court, the famous Nicholas", while his opponents accused him of pride, disregard, and "trampling on the greatness of outstanding people". For a long time, the ruler of Greater Poland, Mieszko III of Poland, considered Gryfita his biggest enemy, saying that he "made princes a laughing stock by arbitrarily appointing them and deposing them from the throne". Wincenty Kadłubek, who later became the bishop of Kraków and a chronicler, lived and observed the ongoing events surrounding Gryfita. It is primarily due to Kadłubek and his chronicle that we know so much about Gryfita today.

== Personal life ==
Gryfita was either the son of Stępotas (a powerful representative of the Lis family) or Klemens from Brzeźnica, also being the father of Klemens of Brzeźnica and brother of Janik. Mikołaj's younger brother was Pełka, appointed for the clerical state. The early death of his father meant that Mikołaj received his education alongside his much older cousin Szczepan, called Magnus the Great/Old. It was there he had the opportunity to encounter many politicians. Szczepan was one of the few officials who had a successful rule in Kraków alongside the seniors of the Piast dynasty, princes Boleslaw Kędzierzawy and Mieszko III.

== See also ==
- Feudal fragmentation of Poland
