= Sack of Kraków =

Sack of Kraków may refer to the following events:

- Mongol sacking of Kraków (1241)
- Mongol sacking of Kraków (1260)
- Prussian sacking of Kraków, notably, of Polish Crown Jewels (1794-1795)
