= First Mongol invasion of Poland =

Military campaign, 1240 to 1241

- Part of the Mongol invasion of Europe
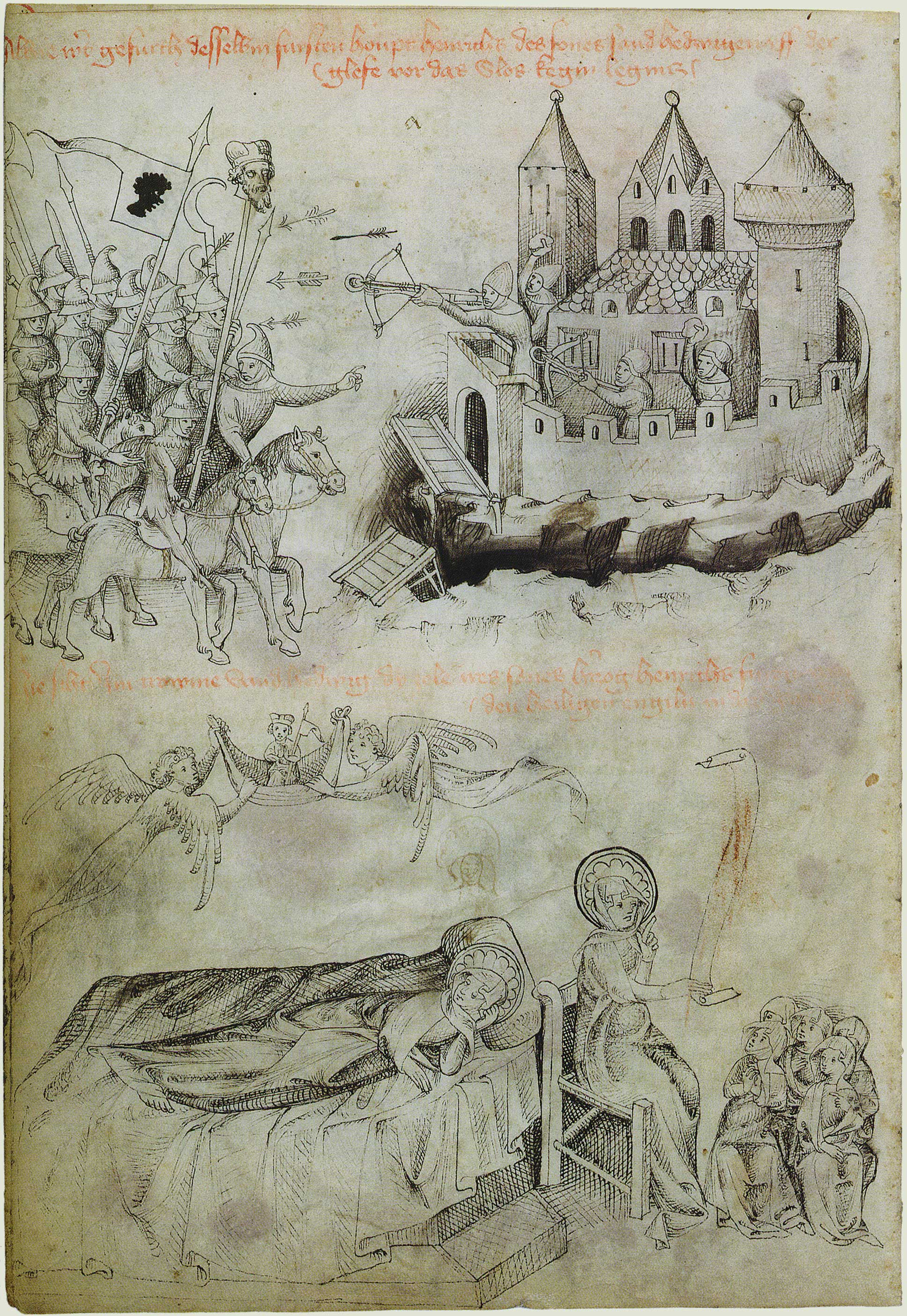
- The Mongols at Legnica display the head of Duke Henry II of Silesia (a 15th-century illumination from the Legend of St. Hedwig)
Date	Late 1240–1241
Location	Parts of eastern and southern Poland
Result	Mongol victory

Belligerents
Mongol Empire	Kingdom of Poland; Margraviate of Moravia; Knights Templar; Holy Roman Empire

Commanders and leaders
Baidar; Kadan; Orda Khan; Subutai	Henry II the Pious †; Mieszko II the Fat; Włodzimierz †; Sulisław †; Pakosław †; Boleslaus Děpolt † (Note: Some Polish medieval chronicles call this exiled member of Děpolt family (a cadet branch of the Přemyslid dynasty) as "Margrave of Moravia" but this title had no merit because Bohemia and Moravia were ruled at that time jointly by one king, Wenceslaus I of Bohemia; moreover, Boleslaus styled himself as Dux Boemiae ("Duke of Bohemia")); Klement of Brzeźnica †; Klement of Ruszcza; Szczepan of Wierzbna †

Strength
~10,000 (one tumen) (Note: Sources vary, with estimates of Mongol forces from 10,000 to 50,000.)	Disputed (see Battle of Legnica)

The Mongol invasion of Poland from late 1240 to 1241 culminated in the Battle of Legnica, where the Mongols defeated an alliance which included forces from fragmented Poland and their allies, led by Henry II the Pious, the Duke of Silesia and High Duke of Poland. The first invasion's intention was to secure the flank of the main Mongolian army attacking the Kingdom of Hungary. The Mongols neutralized any potential help to King Béla IV being provided by the Poles or any military orders.

== Background ==
The Mongols invaded Europe with three armies. One of the three armies was tasked with distracting Poland, before joining the main Mongol force invading Hungary. The Mongol general in charge, Subutai, did not want the Polish forces to be able to threaten his flank during the primary invasion of Hungary. Thus, the Mongol goal was to use a small detachment to prevent the Poles from assisting Hungary until the Hungarians were defeated. The primary Mongol invasion of the Polish duchies was preceded by a reconnaissance expedition. That army, under Baidar, Kadan and Orda Khan, began scouting operations in late 1240. A Mongol detachment, advancing from Ruthenia through Volodymyr-Volhynskyi, invaded the Duchy of Sandomierz in the winter of 1240–1241.

Though the Mongols may have entered with relatively modest goals and forces, they almost completely annihilated the Polish forces and influenced the Bohemian army to defend its homeland instead of assisting beleaguered Hungary.

== Invasion ==
=== Tactics ===
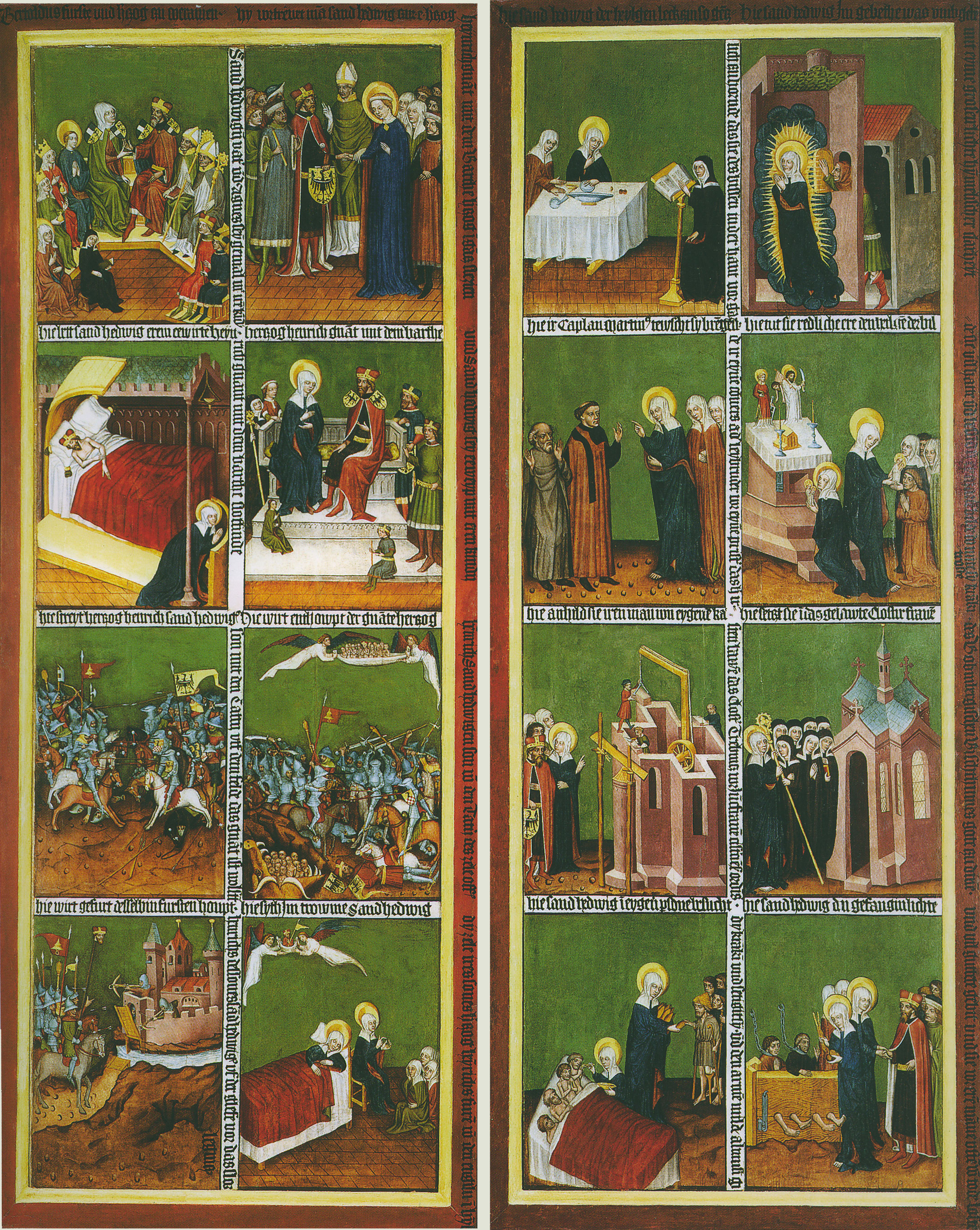
Battle of Legnica, 1241. From a medieval illuminated manuscript

A key feature of the invasion was the speed of the Mongol advance, which kept the Polish defenders uncertain of their strength and movements. Though the Polish forces in total were far larger than the two Mongol tumens (12,000-20,000 men) assigned to defeat them, the Mongols attacked from multiple directions before the Polish armies could merge into one united force. As a result, the Mongols engaged the Polish armies in various battles and skirmishes and defeated them in detail.

=== Route ===
Mongol tumen, moving from recently conquered Volodymyr in Kievan Rus, first destroyed Sutiejsk, then sacked Lublin, after which Sandomierz was besieged and then sacked after surrendering on 13 February. Around this time, their forces split. Orda's forces devastated central Poland, moving to Wolbórz and as far north as Łęczyca, before turning south and heading via Sieradz towards Wrocław. Baidar and Kadan ravaged the southern part of Poland, moving to Chmielnik, Kraków, Opole, and finally, Legnica, before leaving Polish lands heading west and south.

Baidar and Kadan on 13 February defeated a Polish army under the voivode of Kraków, Włodzimierz, in the battle of Tursko. On 18 March they defeated another Polish army with units from Kraków and Sandomierz at the battle of Chmielnik. Panic spread through the Polish lands, and the citizens abandoned Kraków, which was seized and burned by the Mongols by 24 March. In the meantime, one of the most powerful contemporary Dukes of Poland, and Duke of Silesia, Henry II the Pious, gathered his forces and allies around Legnica. Henry, in order to gather more forces, even sacrificed one of the largest towns of Silesia, Wrocław, abandoning it to the Mongols. Henry was also waiting for Wenceslaus I of Bohemia, his brother-in-law, who was coming to his aid with a large army.

=== Battle of Legnica ===
While considering whether to besiege Wrocław, Baidar and Kadan received reports that the Bohemians were days away with a large army. The Mongols turned from Wrocław, not finishing the siege, in order to intercept Henry's forces before the European armies could meet. The Mongols caught up with Henry near Legnica at a place known later as Wahlstatt ("Battlefield" in Middle High German; now the village Legnickie Pole, "Field of Legnica"). Henry, in addition to his own forces, was aided by Mieszko II the Fat (Mieszko II Otyły), as well as remnants of Polish armies defeated at Tursk and Chmielnik, members of military orders, and small numbers of foreign volunteers.

The decisive battle for Poland occurred at the Battle of Legnica on 9 April. A European knight charge appeared to cause that section of the Mongol line to rout, thus leading Henry II to commit his cavalry to chase them. However, the Mongols merely had lured the knights away from their supporting infantry and used a smokescreen to prevent the infantry and remaining cavalry from seeing their more advanced knights being surrounded and massacred. Once the Polish and German knights were killed, the remainder of the Polish army was vulnerable and easily encircled. The later Polish chronicler Jan Długosz claimed that the Mongols caused confusion in the Polish forces by yelling 'Flee!' in Polish through the smokescreen. The Mongols did not take Legnica Castle but had a free rein to pillage and plunder Silesia before moving off to join their main forces in Hungary.

== Legend ==
A contingent of Teutonic Knights of indeterminate number is traditionally believed to have joined the Polish side. However, recent analysis of the 15th-century Annals of Jan Długosz by Labuda suggests that the German crusaders may have been added to the text after chronicler Długosz had completed the work. A legend that the Grand Master of the Teutonic Order, Poppo von Osterna, was killed during the battle is false, as he died at Legnica years later while visiting his wife's nunnery. The Hospitallers have also been said to have participated in this battle, but this too seems to be a fabrication added in later accounts; neither Jan Długosz's accounts nor the letter sent to the King of France (then Saint Louis) from the Templar Grand Master Ponce d'Aubon mention them. Peter Jackson further points out that the only military order that fought at Legnica was the Templars. The Templar contribution was very small, estimated around 68–88 well-trained, well-armed soldiers; their letter to the King of France gives their losses as nine brother knights, three sergeants and 500 'men'—according to their use of the term, laity men at arms from the local secular dioceses.

== Aftermath ==
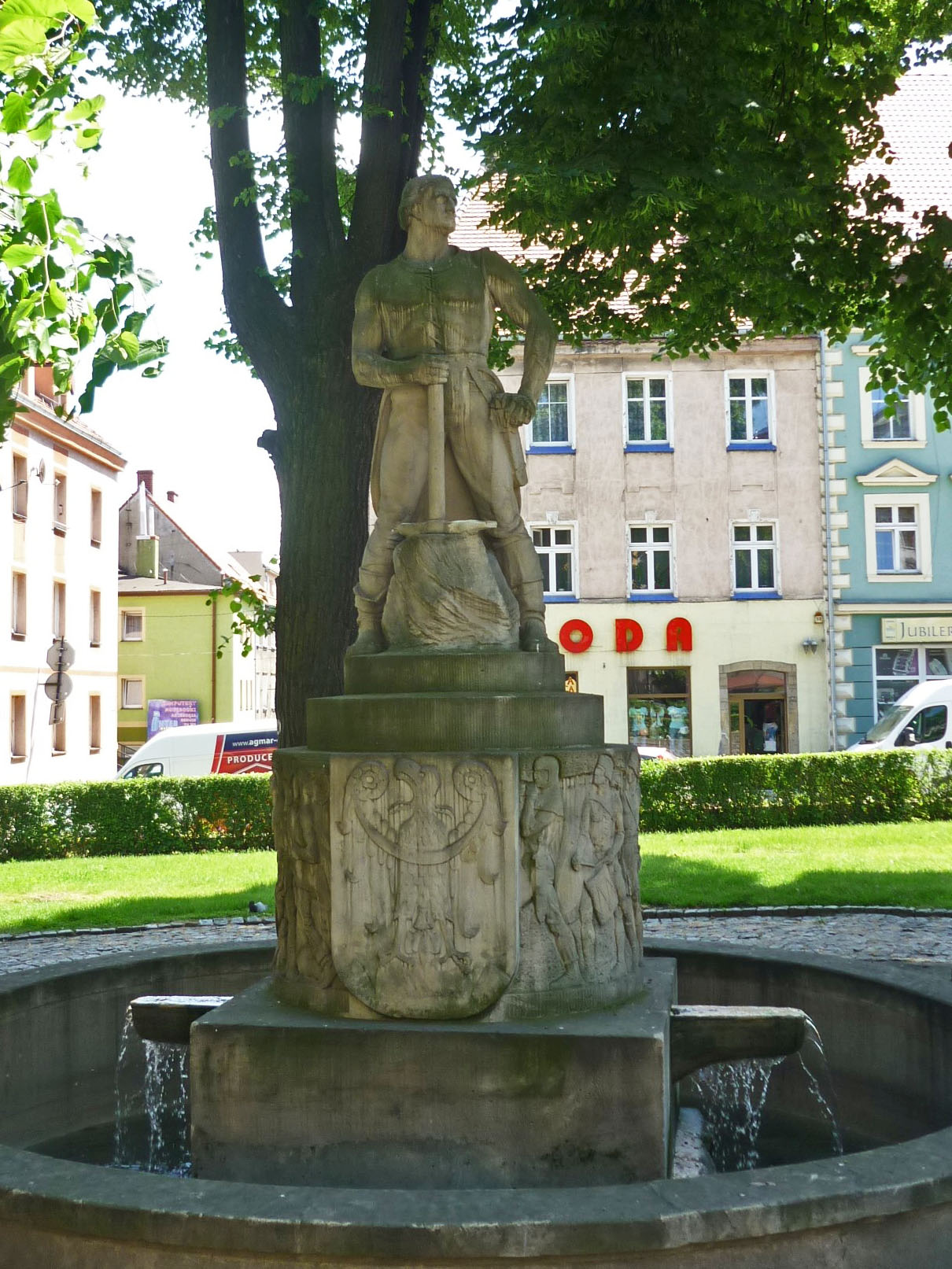
Monument to gold diggers from Złotoryja, Poland killed in the Battle of Legnica

The Mongols avoided the Bohemian forces, who were too frightened to advance and assist the Hungarians, and defeated the Hungarians in the Battle of Mohi. But news that the Grand Khagan Ögedei had died the previous year along with disagreements between the Mongol princes Batu, Guyuk, and Buri caused the descendants of the Grand Khagan to return to the Mongol capital of Karakorum for the kurultai which would elect the next Khagan and probably saved the Polish lands from being completely overrun by the Mongols.

The death of Duke Henry, who was close to unifying the Polish lands and reversing their fragmentation, set back the unification of Poland. It took place in the 14th century, and also meant the loss of Silesia, which would drift outside the Polish sphere of influence (and gradually become a part of the Bohemian Crown).

A number of military settlements such as Sutiejsk were never rebuilt after having been destroyed by the Mongols. This ancient Slavic gord was one of the most important administrative centers of the so-called Land of the Red Gords ("Grody Czerwienskie"), a historic region between Poland and Rus'. This Polish village has a population of 500 today.

== Later Mongol invasions ==
There were also later, larger Mongol invasions of Poland (1259–1260 and 1287–1288).

In 1254 or 1255, Daniel of Galicia revolted against the Mongol rule. He repelled the initial Mongol assault under Orda's son Quremsa. In 1259, the Mongols returned under the new command of Burundai (Mongolian: Borolday). According to some sources, Daniel fled to Poland leaving his son and brother at the mercy of the Mongol army. He may have hidden in the castle of Galicia instead. The Mongols needed to secure Poland's aid to Daniel and war booty to feed the demand of their soldiers. Lithuanians also attacked Smolensk and menaced Torzhok, tributaries of the Golden Horde, in c. 1258. The Mongols sent a punitive expedition into Lithuania for this. The Lithuanians appear to have not resisted them efficiently. Borolday again demanded Daniel to recruit more troops. After demolishing walls of all towns in Galicia and Volhyinia, in 1259, 18 years after the first attack to Poland, two tumens (20,000 men) from the Golden Horde, under the leadership of Berke, attacked Poland after raiding Lithuania. This attack was commanded by the young prince Nogai Khan and general Burundai. The Rus' soldiers under Daniel's son, Lev, and brother, Vasily, joined the Mongol expedition. Lublin, Sandomierz, Zawichost, and Kraków were ravaged and plundered by the Mongol army. Berke had no intention of occupying or conquering Poland. After this raid Pope Alexander IV tried without success to organize a crusade against the Tatars.

Northwestern Rus princes complained to the occupying military Mongol masters about the repeated attacks from the Kingdom of Poland. In response to the complaints, Nogai's army recruited troops from Rus principalities, which included: Vlakh, Kipchak, Alan soldiers [respectively] and an unsuccessful raid followed in 1287, led by Talabuga and Nogai Khan. Lublin, Masovia, Sandomierz, and Sieradz were successfully raided, but they were defeated at Kraków. This raid consisted of less than one tumen, since the Golden Horde's armies were tied down in a new conflict which the Il-Khanate had initiated in 1284. The force retreated instead of facing the larger Polish force.

Ozbek Khan and Jani Beg warred with the powerful kingdom of Poland to secure their claim on western Rus (modern Belarus and Ukraine). Towards 1356, Casimir III the Great reached an agreement with the Golden Horde and apparently undertook to pay tribute in exchange for military support against Lithuania. In a letter to the Teutonic master, he claimed that seven Mongol princes commanding troops were coming to his aid. The Knights, however, were seeking a rapprochement with Lithuania and accused Casimir to the popes as having submitted to the Mongols.

== Sources ==
- Jaworski, Rafał (12 August 2006). "Bitwa pod Legnicą, Chwała Oręża Polskiego". Mówią Wieki (in Polish) (3).
- Urban, William (2003). The Teutonic Knights: A Military History. London: Greenhill Books. ISBN 1-85367-535-0.
- Jackson, Peter (2005). The Mongols and the West. Routledge.
- Zdan, Michael (June 1957). "The Dependence of Halych-Volyn' Rus' on the Golden Horde". Slavonic and East European Review. 35 (85): 505–522. JSTOR 4204855.
