= Sack of Sandomierz (1241) =

Battle of the first Mongol invasion of Poland

- Part of the first Mongol invasion of Poland
Date	13 February 1241
Location	Sandomierz, Poland
Result	Capture and destruction of the city of Sandomierz

Belligerents
Mongol Empire	Kingdom of Poland

Commanders and leaders
Baidar; Kadan	Pakosław of Sandomierz

Strength
Unknown	Unknown

Casualties and losses
Unknown	Estimated very high

The sack of Sandomierz during the first Mongol invasion of Poland took place on 13 February 1241. It ended in the victory of the Mongol forces, who captured the city and burned it, massacring the residents.

During the Mongol invasion of Poland, southeastern Polish city of Sandomierz was regarded by the invaders as a strategically important location, which had to be captured. Sandomierz lies near the confluence of the Vistula and the San rivers, near the 13th-century border between the Kingdom of Poland and Mongol-controlled Red Ruthenia.

The invaders captured Sandomierz on 13 February 1241, after crossing the frozen Vistula. According to Jan Długosz, forces of the khan besieged both the city, and the castle. After breaking defences, they murdered the Abbot of Koprzywnica, and all monks from Koprzywnica's Abbey, who had fled to the city. A great number of residents of the area was massacred, and the invaders saved only young men, whom they enslaved.

During the siege, the Mongols used specially designed engines, especially stone throwing machines, which threw rocks weighing over 100 kilograms. The city was captured after four days, and after the sack, Mongol forces headed westwards, to Wiślica and Skalbmierz. On the day of the capture of Sandomierz, the Battle of Tursko took place.

In 1259–1260, the Mongols sieged and captured Sandomierz again, razing the city and massacring its residents.

== See also ==
- Sacking of Sandomierz (1260)

== Sources ==
- Tomislaw Giergiel, Tatarzy w Sandomierzu
- Piastowie. Leksykon biograficzny, wyd. 1999, str. 397
- Wielka Historia Polski cz. do 1320, wyd. Pinexx 1999, s. 187-188
- Stanislaw Krakowski, Polska w walce z najazdami tatarskimi w XIII wieku, wyd. MON 1956, str. 136-137
