= Gryfit family =

Polish medieval knightly family

Gryf coat of arms

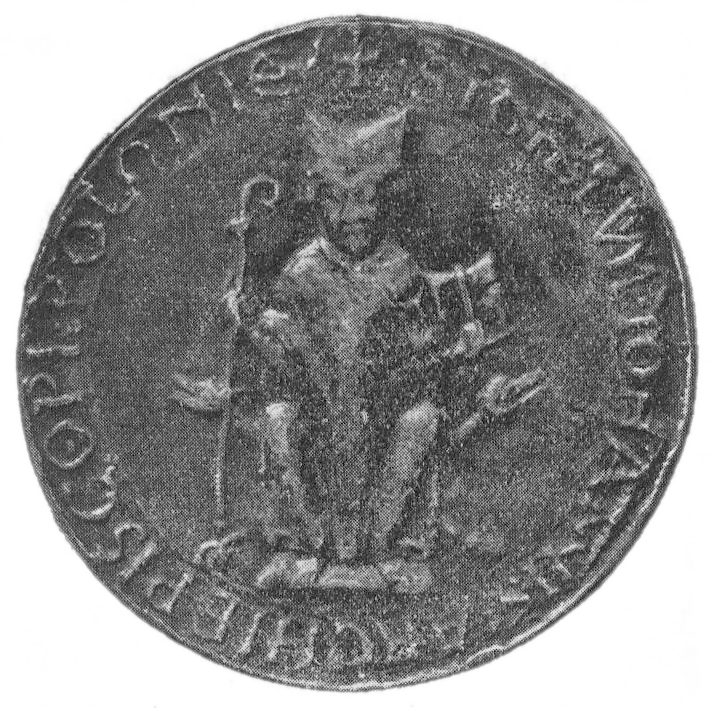
Janik, Archbishop of Gniezno, 12th century

The Gryfit, also known as Świebodzic, was a medieval Polish knightly family. They occupied a dominant position among the nobles of Lesser Poland in the 12th and 13th century.

== History ==
The family name comes from the emblem Gryf (a Griffin) of their coat of arms. In particular for the period before the 14th century they are also called Świebodzice, because of their battle cry: Świeboda, (freedom, liberty). Jan Długosz connected the family with the House of Griffins. According to some historians, the Gryfici family, the House of Griffins and the House of Sobiesław are descendants of a branch of the Piast dynasty and their progenitor was one of the younger brothers of Bolesław the Brave - Świętopełk.

== Notable members ==
- Jaksa z Miechowa (died 1176) – crusader, możnowładca (magnate) in Lesser Poland (according to some historians he is the same person as Jaxa of Köpenick, Prince of the Sprevane), son-in-law of Piotr Włostowic
- Janik (died after 1167) – Bishop of Gniezno
- Mikołaj (died 1202) – Voivode of Kraków, commander of the forces of Lesser Poland at the Battle of Mozgawa
- Marek z Brzeźnicy (died 1230/1231) – Voivode of Kraków
- Teodor (died 1237) – Voivode of Kraków
- Klemens z Brzeźnicy (died 1241) – castellan of Kraków, died at the Battle of Chmielnik
- Jan Klimontowic (died after 1243) – castellan of Cieszyn and Toszek
- Andrzej z Brzeźnicy (died 1244) – Bishop of Płock
- Klemens z Ruszczy (died 1256) – castellan and Voivode of Kraków, closest associate of Bolesław V the Chaste
- Wierzbięta z Ruszczy (died after 1310) – castellan and Voivode of Kraków
- Wierzbięta z Branic (died 1424) – Stolnik of Kraków

== Branches ==
- House of Branicki
- House of Mielecki

== See also ==
- Gryf coat of arms

== Bibliography ==
- A. Małecki, Studya heraldyczne, t. I, Lwów 1890, pp. 268-285, t. II, Lwów 1890, pp. 46-67
- L. M. Wójcik, Ród Gryfitów do końca XIII wieku. Pochodzenie — genealogia — rozsiedlenie, "Historia" CVII, Wrocław 1993.
