= Sulisław of Kraków =

Polish nobleman (died 1241)

Sulisław of Kraków (Polish: Sulisław z Krakowa, Sulisław Gryfita; 12th century – 9 April 1241 in Legnica, Poland) was a Polish knight, Gryf nobleman, and member of the House of Duninowie. He commanded a Polish army from Lesser Poland, including the Cracovians, at the Battle of Legnica, fighting the Mongol invasion army.

He died in action alongside the Polish Grand Duke Henry II the Pious and the majority of the Polish army.

His older brother Włodzimierz served as voivode of Krakow until he was killed at the Battle of Chmielnik. Sulisław's son, Klemens, succeeded Włodzimierz as voivode of Krakow.

== Family ==
Sulisław had 2 children.

- Klement of Ruszcza (Voivode of Kraków) h. Gryf and Sezem
- Ziemia z Ruszczy (i Niegardowa > Dobranowic) h. Gryf
