= Battle of Suchodoł =

1241 battle in Eastern Europe

Date	25 May 1243
Location	Suchodoł
Result	Małpolskie/Hungarian Victory

Belligerents
Małpolskie; Kingdom of Hungary	Mazovia; Opole-Racibórz

Commanders and leaders
Klement of Ruszcza	Konrad I of Masovia; Mieszko II the Fat (WIA)

The Battle of Suchodoł was fought on 25 May 1243 between the Lesser Poland forces of Klement of Ruszcza, representing supporters of Boleslaw Wstydliwy, and supported by Hungarian troops of Béla IV of Hungary; against the Masovian forces of Konrad Mazowiecki, with further support by several units of Mieszko II the Fat.

The army of Klement of Ruszcza won and as a result of the defeat Konrad Mazowiecki abandoned Krakow, which he had held since 1241 after the death of Henry II the Pious at Legnica. Konrad's son-in-law Prince of Opole-Racibórz Mieszko II was seriously injured in the battle. Konrad would try to further invasions of Lesser Poland, one in 1244 and another in 1246.
