= Szczepan of Wierzbna =

Polish nobleman (died 1241)

Szczepan (Stefan) of Wierzbna (Polish: Szczepan Andrzejowicz z Wierzbnej) also called "Magnus" was a Polish noble and Castellan of Bolesławiec, Niemcza, and Chełmno. He died in March 1241 in the Battle of Legnica alongside his son Andrzej of Wierzbna (Polish: Andrzej Szczepanowic z Wierzbnej).
