= Piotr I Półkozic =

Polish bishop

Piotr Półkozic
- Bishop of Płock
- Church: Catholic Church
- Diocese: Diocese of Płock
- In office: c. 1232 – c. 1239
- Predecessor: Gunter Prus
- Successor: Andrzej Gryfita

Personal details
- Died: c. 1239

Piotr (I) of the coat of arms of Półkozice (died around 1239) was bishop of Płock around the years 1232–1239. He was previously a canon of Płock.

== Biography ==
He was probably a Płock canon in 1207. Active during the foundation process of the Order of the Dobrzyń brothers. In 1232, he was elected a bishop of Płock by the cathedral chapter, according to Jan Dlugosz half of them supported him. Supported by the prince of Mazovia, Konrad I, with whom he held the office of Vice-Chancellor. Thanks to his support, he received a commission from Pope Gregory IX and probably even in the year of the election he appeared as a bishop. He conducted extensive mediation activities in disputes between Piast princes of the district. He sat on the 6 October 1237 papal commission settling a dispute between the prince of Wrocław, Henry I the Bearded and the prince of Wielkopolska, Władysław Odonic. He witnessed on the divisional document between Mazovia and Kujawy between the older sons of Prince Konrad - Bolesław I and Kazimierz I in 1238. He supported the economic development of his diocese. In 1237 he issued a location privilege for the city of Płock, contributing to its subsequent development. In 1239, on the part of the Masovian dukes, Konrad I and Bolesław I obtained exemption privileges for the Płock Church. He was buried in the cathedral of Płock.
