= Pakosław of Sandomierz =

13th-century Polish nobleman

Pakosław of Sandomierz (Polish: Pakosław z Sandomierza or Pakosław Sandomierski) was a Polish nobleman who served as Voivode of Sandomierz in the first half of the 13th century, during the period of the feudal fragmentation of Poland. He is best known for his role in the defence of Lesser Poland during the First Mongol invasion of Poland and for commanding the Sandomierz contingent at the Battle of Chmielnik in 1241.

== Life ==
Pakosław is recorded in 13th-century charters as one of the leading nobles of the Kraków–Sandomierz region and a close associate of the ducal court. According to modern prosopographical studies of Małopolska officials, he held the office of voivode of Sandomierz roughly from the 1230s until the early 1240s, making him one of the highest-ranking lay dignitaries in the duchy.

== Mongol invasion and Battle of Chmielnik ==
When the First Mongol invasion of Poland reached Lesser Poland, Pakosław as voivode was responsible for the defence of the Sandomierz region. In February 1241 the Mongols captured and burned Sandomierz, after which Pakosław is said to have withdrawn with surviving forces towards Kraków.

On 18 March 1241 he and the Kraków voivode Włodzimierz of Cracow led a combined army drawn from the Kraków and Sandomierz provinces against the main Mongol force near Chmielnik. Medieval narrative sources, especially the chronicle of Jan Długosz, describe Pakosław as commanding the Sandomierz contingent on the right wing of the Polish line and taking an active part in the fighting.

The Polish army was defeated after an initial phase in which it appears to have had some success; most of the Kraków–Sandomierz knights were killed or captured. Older historiography, following Długosz, usually stated that Pakosław fell in the battle together with Włodzimierz and other leading nobles, while some modern popular accounts instead suggest that he managed to escape from the field with a small group of retainers. Prosopographical research, which still records Pakosław among high-ranking office-holders after 1241, has led some historians to question the traditional version of his death and to consider the possibility that he survived the Mongol campaign and died a few years later.
