= Boleslaus, son of Děpolt =

Boleslaus Děpolt
- Died: April 9, 1241; Wahlstatt near Legnica, Silesia, fragmented Poland (now Legnickie Pole, Poland)
- Noble family: Přemyslid
- Father: Děpolt III
- Mother: Adéla (Adelaida) Zbyslava of Silesia

Boleslaus, son of Děpolt (Czech: Boleslav Děpoltic, Polish: Bolesław Dypoldowic; c. 1190 – April 9, 1241), allegedly nicknamed Szepiołka ("Lisper" in Polish), was an exiled member of the Děpolt family (a cadet branch of the Přemyslid dynasty) who with his brothers (Děpolt IV Bořivoj, Sobeslaus I, and Otto of Magdeburg) and mother Adelaide lived for most of his life in Silesia, at court of Wrocław dukes Henry the Bearded and Henry II the Pious.

Some Polish medieval chronicles referred to him as the "Margrave of Moravia" but this title had no relevance because Bohemia and Moravia were ruled at that time jointly by kings from the main Přemyslid line and the title of margrave was reserved for royal princes. Moreover, Boleslaus – just like his brothers – styled himself as Dux Boemiae ("Duke of Bohemia") because until the end of his days he didn't give up a claim to govern in the Bohemian Kingdom.

He died in chivalric manner, during a lost battle with Mongol hordes which invaded the Central Europe.

== Life ==
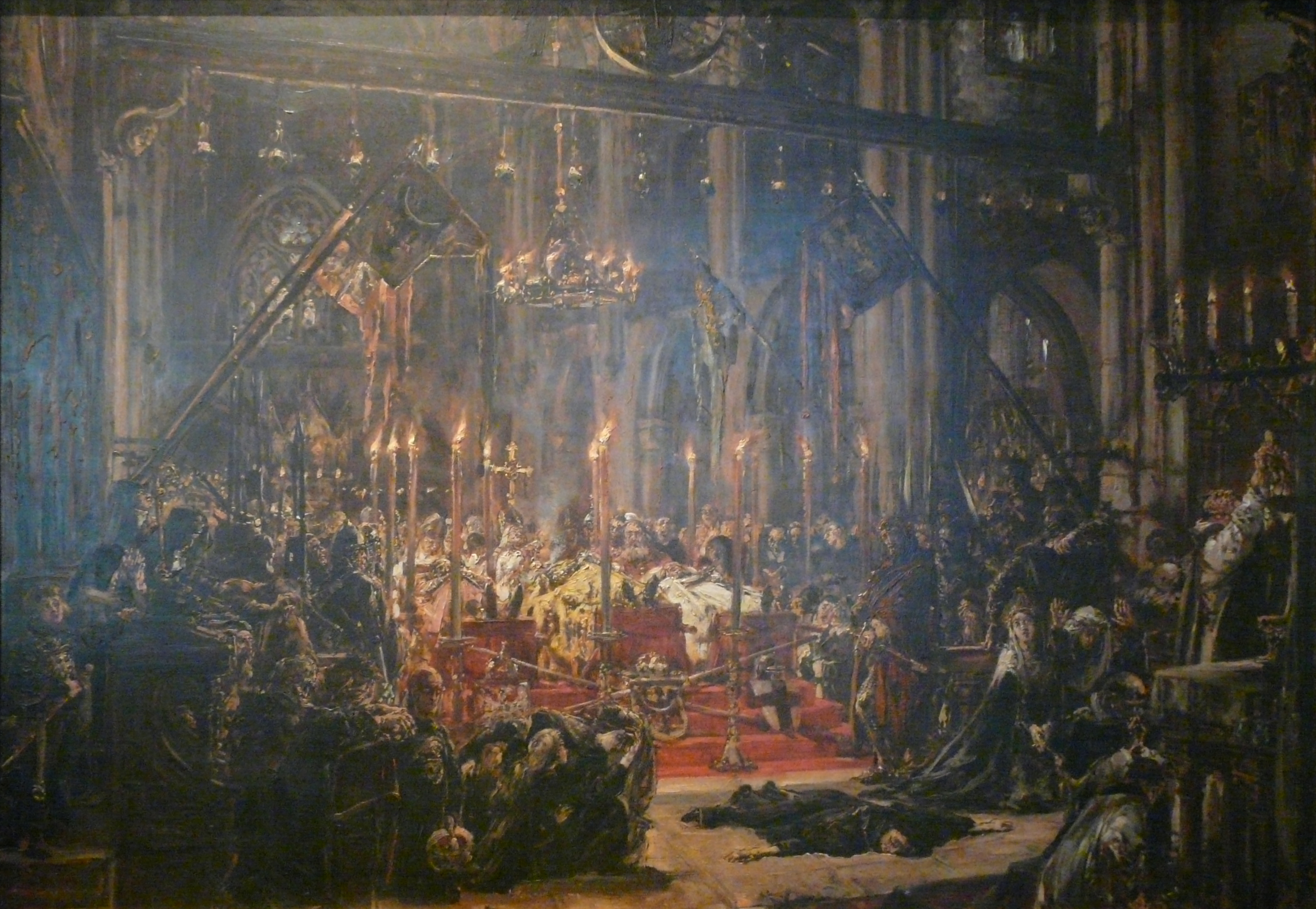
Legnica's Defeat – Revival (1888). Historicist painting by Jan Matejko from its cycle History of Civilization in Poland. A funeral depicting the bodies of the fallen of Legnica – Boleslaus Děpolt lies on the first left catafalque

In 1202, Boleslaus, together with his brother Děpolt Bořivoj, was banished by the king Přemysl Ottokar I of Bohemia but he later returned in 1204. For the second time, he was exiled in 1223 by the same king, after a futile and lost attempt by his father Děpolt III to obtain the royal throne in Prague. After the death of the duke Děpolt in defence battle of Kouřim against the king Ottokar, the rest of Děpolt family went to exile at the court of Silesian ruler Henry the Bearded, as he was brother of Děpolt's wife Adéla of Silesia. Brothers Bořivoj, Sobeslaus, and Boleslaus left the country with their respective druzhinas (armed retinues, companions).

=== Death in battle ===
He commanded volunteer Bavarian miners from Silesian town Goldberg (Złotoryja) and his Czech retinue at the Battle of Legnica, alongside the Poles and Silesians. During the battle, he was shot by an arrow hitting below his ear.
