= Andrzej Gryfita =

Polish bishop

- Bishop of Płock
- Church: Catholic Church
- Diocese: Diocese of Płock
- In office: 1 August 1238 – 7 January 1244
- Predecessor: Piotr I Półkozic
- Successor: Piotr Brevis

Personal details
- Died: 7 January 1244

Andrzej Gryfita was the Bishop of Płock in Poland from 1239 until his death in 1244 AD. He was also known as Andrzej of Brzeźnica.

== Family ==
He was brother of Klemens of Brzeźnica.

== Career ==
He was elected Bishop in 1239 with the support of Bolesław, Duke of Masovia. As bishop he gained privileges from the Duke. He advocated for missions into Prussia and made grants to the Church in Zambskach.

Gryfita died on 7 January 1244. He was last mentioned in a document dated 4 August 1243, which was part of an ongoing legal action.

Religious titles
Preceded by Piotr I Półkozic	Bishop of Płock; 1239-1244	Succeeded by Piotr Brevis
