= Skała =

Town in Lesser Poland Voivodeship, Poland

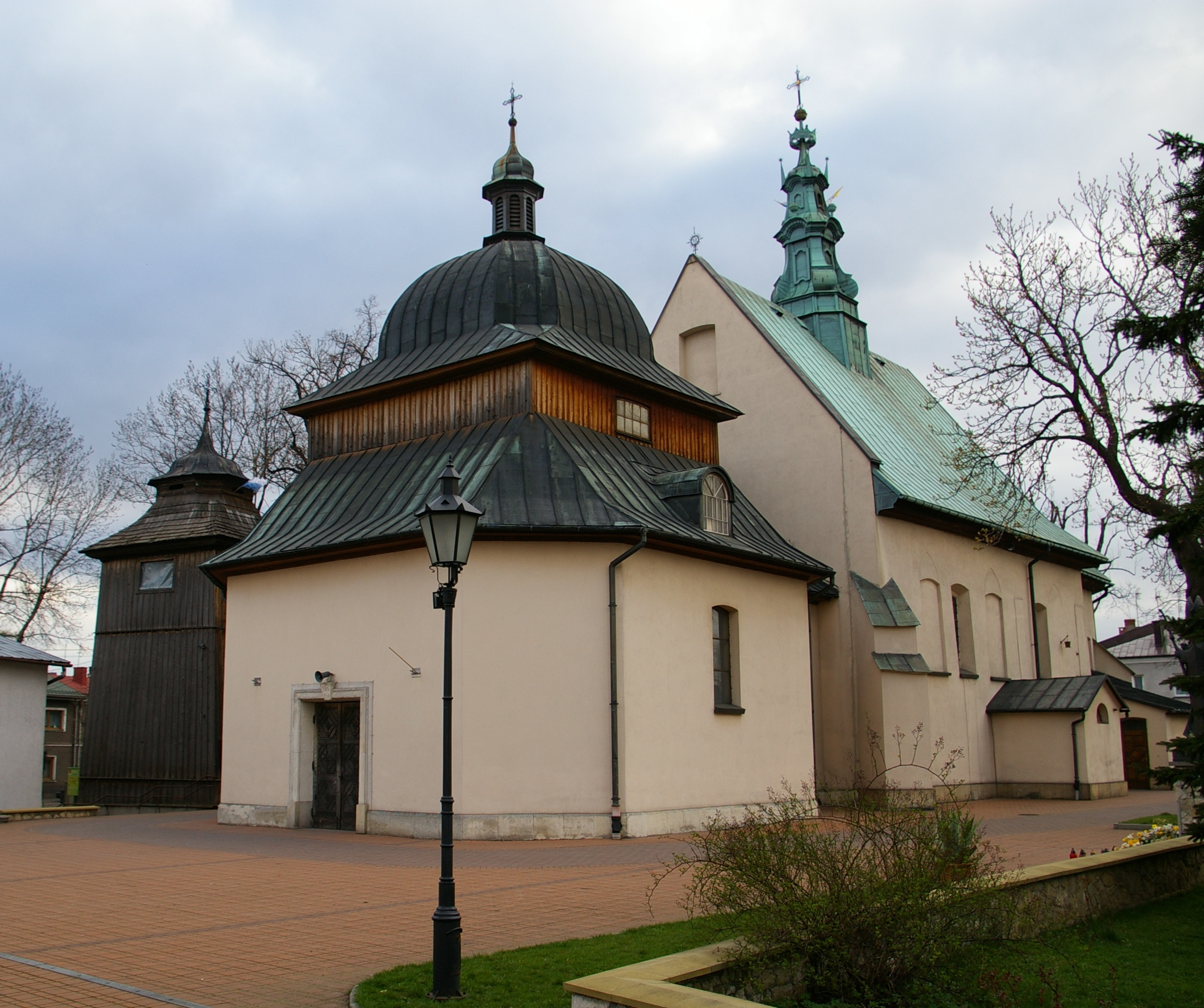
- Saint Nicholas church in Skała

- Flag Coat of arms

- Location within Poland
- Coordinates: 50°13′50″N 19°51′13″E
- Country: Poland
- Voivodeship: Lesser Poland
- County: Kraków
- Gmina: Skała
- Town rights: 1267

Government
  - Mayor: Piotr Trzcionka (PSL)

Area
  - Total: 2.97 km^{2} (1.15 sq mi)

Population (2006)
  - Total: 3,801
  - Density: 1,280/km^{2} (3,310/sq mi)
- Time zone: UTC+1 (CET)
  - Summer (DST): UTC+2 (CEST)
- Postal code: 32-043
- Car plates: KRA
- Website: http://www.skala.pl

Skała [ˈskawa] is a town in Kraków County, in the Lesser Poland Voivodeship, in southern Poland. On December 31, 2010, its population was 3,646.

Skala is one of the oldest towns in Lesser Poland. In the early 13th century, it was a defensive gord, known as Scala and Magna Schala. Its name (the Polish word skała means rock in English) probably comes from a rocky hill above the Pradnik river valley.

== History ==
During the period known as Fragmentation of Poland (1148–1320), Skala was the object of frequent clashes between the Piast dynasty princes. In 1228, a battle took place here between the army of Silesian prince Henry I the Bearded and Mazovian duke Konrad I of Masovia. The Silesians won, forcing Mazovian units to retreat from Lesser Poland. Skała received town rights modelled after Środa Śląska on November 10, 1267, due to efforts of Salomea, the sister of duke Boleslaw V the Chaste. The town itself was located in the area of earlier village of Stańków (Stankoy), and became home to a monastery of the Order of Poor Ladies, who came here in the 1260s.

In the late Middle Ages Skała prospered, due to a convenient location on a merchant route from Kraków to Greater Poland. The town belonged to Kraków Voivodeship, and was a local center of trade, with several guilds and a brewery, whose beer was popular in Kraków. The town was famous for its shoemakers and butchers, who delivered their produce to the markets at Kraków. Skała burned in several fires (1611, 1737, 1763, 1810, 1914), and in 1580, its population was 218. In the year 1596, there were 92 houses at Skała, and a school. Like almost all towns in Lesser Poland, Skała was destroyed during the Swedish invasion of Poland (1655–1660).

In 1794, after the Battle of Racławice, Tadeusz Kościuszko designed Skała as a fortified camp, protecting northern approaches to the city of Kraków. On May 18, 1794, Prussian Army attacked and captured Skała. The town was annexed by Austria in the Third Partition of Poland in 1795. After the Polish victory in the Austro-Polish War of 1809, it became part of the short-lived Duchy of Warsaw, and after the duchy's dissolution in 1815, it became part of Russian-controlled Congress Poland. As a result, the town was cut off from Kraków, which remained part of Austrian Galicia. Due to the proximity of the sealed border, the development of Skała was stopped for more than 100 years, as both Russian and Austrian governments did not promote mutual trade.

During the January Uprising, several skirmishes between Russian troops and Polish rebels took place in the area of Skała. In the nearby Ojców a Polish camp was created, under Marian Langiewicz. On March 5, 1863, a battle took place at a Skała cemetery. As a result, in 1870 Russian authorities stripped Skała of its town charter. In the late 19th century the population of the village was 2,823, with 12% Jewish. In the first months of World War I, heavy fighting between Russians and Austrians took place here. In 1918, Poland regained independence and control of Skała. In the Second Polish Republic, Skała belonged to Kielce Voivodeship, with a population of 3,593 in 1921.

During World War II, the village was captured and burned by the Wehrmacht on September 6, 1939 (see Invasion of Poland). A ghetto was established for the Skała Jews; besides executions the town Jews were deported to the ghettos of Słomniki and Wolbrom. During the German occupation, Skała was an important center of Polish resistance, including the local unit of the Home Army under the cryptonym "Sylwester". In July 1944, the Home Army units fought the Germans in several skirmishes.

After the war, Skała remained a village until 1987. From 1975 to 1998, it was administratively located in the Kraków Voivodeship.

== Sights ==
The town retains its medieval urban shape, with a large market square in the middle, and a stone monument of Saint Florian (ca. 1800). Skała is the seat of a gmina, and has a late Baroque church (18th century), with a wooden bell tower (1765).
