= Battle of Legnica =

1241 battle of the first Mongol invasion of Poland

- Part of the first Mongol invasion of Poland
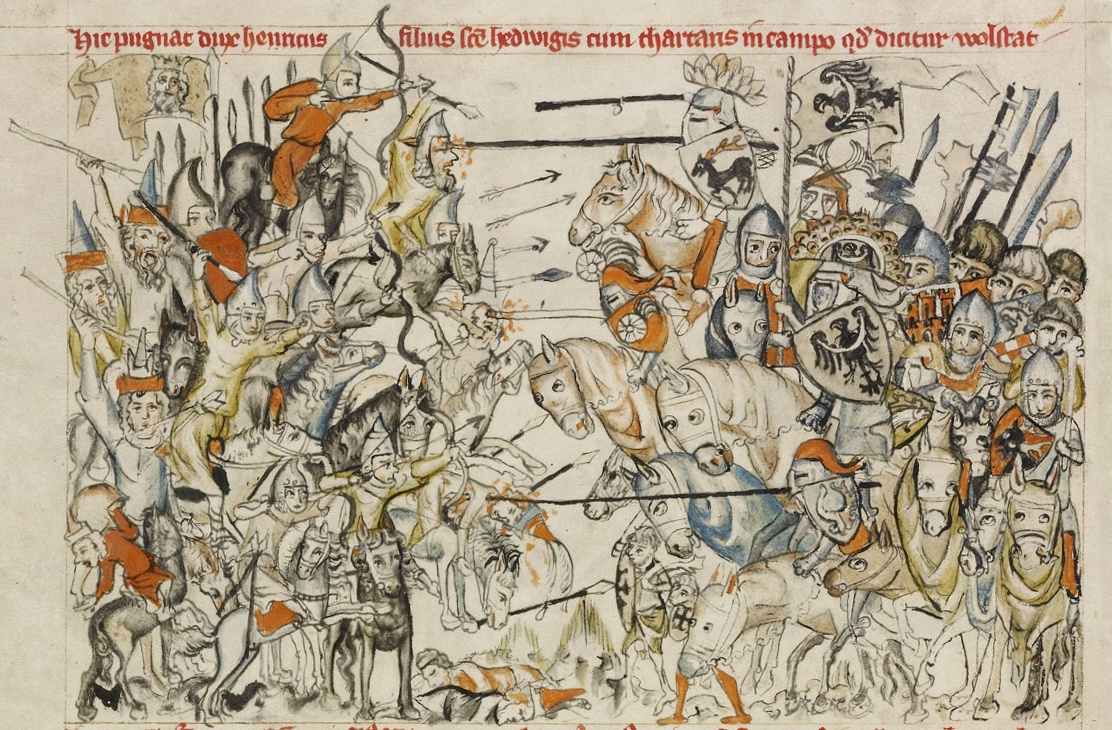
- Depiction of the Battle of Legnica in 1241
Date	9 April 1241
Location	Legnica, Poland; 51°8′43″N 16°13′22″E
Result	Mongol victory

Belligerents
Mongol Empire	Poland; Moravia; Knights Templar

Commanders and leaders
Baidar; Kadan; Orda Khan; Subutai (strategic coordinator)	Henry II †; Mieszko II; Sulisław of Cracow †; Boleslaus Děpolt †

Strength
3,000–8,000 cavalry	2,000–8,000

Casualties and losses
Unknown	Entire army

The Battle of Legnica (Polish: bitwa pod Legnicą), also known as the Battle of Liegnitz (German: Schlacht von Liegnitz) or Battle of Wahlstatt (German: Schlacht bei Wahlstatt), was fought between the Mongol Empire and combined European forces at the village of Legnickie Pole (Wahlstatt), approximately 10 kilometres (6 mi) southeast of the city of Legnica in the Duchy of Silesia on 9 April 1241.

A combined force of Poles and Moravians under the command of Duke Henry II the Pious of Silesia, supported by feudal nobility and a few knights from military orders sent by Pope Gregory IX, attempted to halt the Mongol invasion of Poland. The battle took place two days before the Mongol victory over the Hungarians at the much larger Battle of Mohi.

== Historical disputations ==
As with many historical battles, the exact details of force composition, tactics, and the actual course of the battle are lacking and sometimes contradictory.

The general historical view is that it was a crushing defeat for the Polish and Moravian forces where they suffered heavy casualties.

One of the Mongol leaders, Kadan, was frequently confused with Ögedei's grandson Kaidu by medieval chroniclers, and thus Kaidu has often been mistakenly listed as leading the Mongol forces at Legnica.

== Background ==
The Mongols considered the Cumans to have submitted to their authority, but the Cumans fled westward and sought asylum within the Kingdom of Hungary. After King Béla IV of Hungary rejected Batu Khan's ultimatum to surrender the Cumans, Subutai began planning the Mongol invasion of Europe. Batu and Subutai were to lead two armies to attack Hungary itself, while a third under Baidar, Orda Khan and Kadan would attack Poland as a diversion to occupy northern European forces which might come to Hungary's aid.

Orda's forces devastated northern Poland and the southwestern border of Lithuania. Baidar and Kadan ravaged the southern part of Poland: first they sacked Sandomierz in order to draw the Northern European armies away from Hungary; then on 3 March they defeated a Polish army in the battle of Tursko; then on 18 March they defeated another Polish army at Chmielnik; on 24 March they seized and burned Kraków, and a few days later they tried unsuccessfully to capture the Silesian capital of Wrocław. While deciding whether or not to besiege Wrocław, Baidar and Kadan received reports that King Wenceslaus I of Bohemia was two days away with an army over twice the size of Henry's. The Mongols turned from Wrocław to intercept Henry's forces before the European armies could meet. The Mongols caught up with Henry near Legnica at Legnickie Pole (Polish for "Field of Legnica"), also known as Wahlstatt.

== Composition ==
=== Mongols ===
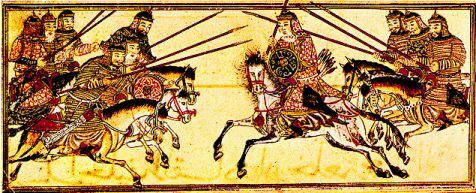
The Mongol heavy cavalry in battle (13th or 14th century).

The Mongol diversionary force, a detachment (between one and two tumens in size) from the army of Subutai, demonstrated the advantages of the tactical mobility and speed of mounted archery. The Mongol tactics were essentially a long series of feigned attacks and faked withdrawals from widely dispersed groups, which were designed to inflict a constant slow drain by ranged fire, disrupt the enemy formation and draw larger numbers away from the main body into ambush and flank attacks. These were standard Mongol tactics used in virtually all of their major battles; they were made possible by continual training and superb battlefield communication, which used a system of flags. The Mongol commander found the highest ground at the battle site, seized it and used it to communicate to his noyans and lesser commanders their orders for troop movement. The Mongol system was a stark contrast to the European systems, in which knights advanced with basically no communication with supporting forces.

The numbers involved are difficult to judge. European accounts vary as to Mongol numbers—some suggest more than 100,000 at Legnica alone. These are gross overestimates, given that this number is far larger than the entire Mongol force in all of Europe at the time, as well as not taking into account the weaknesses of 13th-century Mongol logistical support in Western Eurasia. Current estimates suggest the Mongol force numbered, at most, 25,000 cavalry. The Historia Tatarorum by the Franciscan C. de Bridia Monachi suggests a Mongol force of 10,000 troops, which would have been reduced to around 8,000 after casualties suffered earlier in the campaign, at the Battle of Chmielnik, Battle of Tursko, and the Battle of Tarczek. A contemporary European account, the Ystoria Mongalorum, supports these numbers, placing the Mongol force that invaded Poland at 10,000 horsemen.

=== Polish states and allies ===
According to James Chambers, Henry's force numbered at most 25,000 troops, most likely less, and had a large number of untrained and poorly equipped men, sometimes with no weapons other than the tools of their trade. Lesser trained forces included an army from Opole under Duke Mieszko II the Fat; Moravians led by Boleslav, son of the Margrave of Moravia Děpolt III; conscripts from Greater Poland; and volunteer Bavarian miners from not long before established town of Goldberg (Złotoryja). Henry's better trained troops were his own gathered in his Silesian realm, mercenaries, and very small contingents of French Knights Templar and other foreign volunteers.

Historian Marek Cetwiński estimates the allied force to have been 2,000 strong, while Gerard Labuda estimates 7,000–8,000 soldiers in the Christian army.

A contingent of Teutonic Knights of indeterminate number is traditionally believed to have joined the allied army. However, recent analysis of the 15th-century Annals of Jan Długosz by Labuda suggests that the German crusaders may have been added to the text after chronicler Długosz had completed the work. A legend that the Grand Master of the Teutonic Order, Poppo von Osterna, was killed during the battle is false, as he died at Legnica years later while visiting his wife's nunnery. The Hospitallers have also been said to have participated in this battle, but this too seems to be a fabrication added in later accounts; neither Jan Długosz's accounts nor the letter sent to the King of France from the Templar Master of France, Ponce d'Aubon, mention them. Peter Jackson further points out that the only military order that fought at Legnica was the Templars. The Templar contribution was very small, estimated around 68–88 well-trained, well-armed soldiers; their letter to the king of France gives their losses as three brother knights, two sergeants and 500 'men'—according to their use of the term, probably peasants working their estates and thus neither better armed or trained than the rest of the army's infantry.

== The battle ==
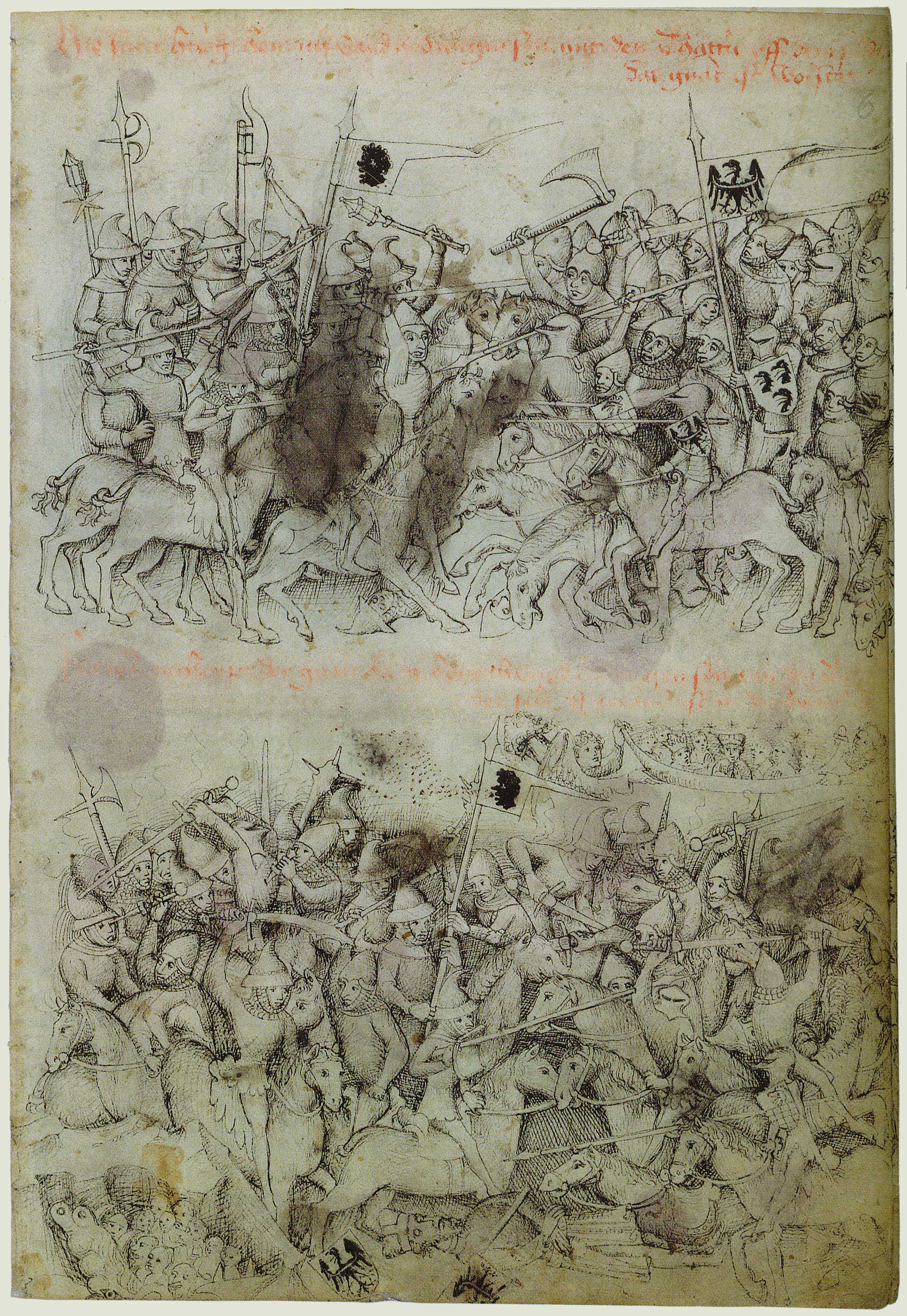
Henry II the Pious of Poland was killed in the Battle of Legnica.

Henry divided his forces into four sections: the Bavarian miners led by Boleslav of Moravia; the conscripts from Greater Poland along with some Cracovians led by Sulisław, the brother of the killed palatine of Kraków; the army of Opole under Mieszko; and, under Henry's personal command, the Silesians, Moravians, and Templars.

According to Chambers' description of the battle, the Silesian cavalry initiated combat with the vanguard (mangudai) of the Mongol army. After the Silesians were repelled, the cavalry of Greater Poland, led by Sulisław, and the cavalry of Opole then attacked the Mongols. The Mongol vanguard retreated, inducing the allied cavalry to pursue, thereby separating them from the Polish infantry. Although the mangudai fled, Mongol light cavalry flanked the Polish forces. A smokescreen was used to hide the Mongol movements and confuse the Europeans. While the Mongol light cavalry attacked from the flanks and the heavy cavalry attacked from the front, Mongol archers peppered the Polish forces with arrows.

Erik Hildinger indicates that the levies of Boleslav led the attack, instead of the Silesians. He adds that after the Polish cavalry began their pursuit during the Mongols' feigned retreat, a rider shouted "Run! Run!" (in Polish) to the Polish forces, confusing Mieszko, who ordered his Opole contingent to retreat from the battle. This withdrawal led Henry to order his own reserves and cavalry into the fight.

The Mongols had much success in the battle by feigning their retreat. After the Polish knights detached from the main body of allied forces in pursuit of the fleeing Mongols, the invaders were able to separate the knights from the infantry and defeat them one by one.

The Annals of Jan Długosz also describes the battle, although it was written in the 15th century, not when it actually occurred. The army of Henry II was almost destroyed—Henry and Boleslav of Moravia were killed and estimates of casualties range from 2,000 to 40,000, essentially the entire army. Ponce d'Aubon reported to King Louis IX of France that the military order lost 500 people, both in Legnica and subsequent raids on three Templar villages and two "towers" among them nine brothers, three knights, and two sergeants. This number likely included civilians of the villages. Mongol casualties are unknown; a perfect execution of their standard tactics would have minimized losses, but the Mongols endured sufficient casualties to dissuade them from attacking the Bohemian army.

The Mongols cut the right ear off each fallen European in order to count the dead; supposedly they filled nine sackfuls, though this has as much validity as European accounts of the numbers of Mongols. Henry was struck down and beheaded while attempting to flee the battlefield with three bodyguards, and the Mongols paraded his head on a spear before the town of Legnica.

== Conclusion ==
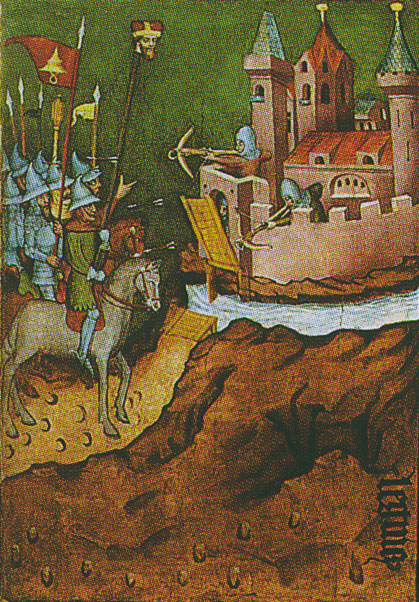
A scene from an altar of St. Hedwig of Silesia: Mongol warriors display the head of Henry II the Pious of Poland on a long lance in an attempt to weaken the morale of the defenders. Painting of 1430.

Wenceslaus I of Bohemia, who had been a day's march away, fell back to gather reinforcements from Thuringia and Saxony upon learning of the defeat. He was overtaken by the Mongol vanguard at Kłodzko. However, his force was far larger and more powerful than the host at Legnica, and the Mongol detachment was routed by the Bohemian cavalry. As Baidar and Kadan's orders had been to serve as a diversion, they stayed to keep the Bohemian forces tied up, avoiding confrontation with the larger army while splitting up into bands and sacking minor towns and villages. Eventually, they turned away from Bohemia and Poland and headed southward to join Batu and Subutai, who had defeated the Hungarians at the Battle of Mohi.

Larger invasions of Poland, devoted primarily to looting, would be launched later. Led by Burundai, the Mongols successfully raided Poland in 1259–1260. They raided again under the leadership of Tulabuga and Nogai Khan, accompanied by vassal troops from Ruthenia, but were unsuccessful in 1287. Although the Mongols repeatedly expressed a desire to conquer central Europe in ultimatums up to the 1270s, Poland and Hungary stayed outside of the Golden Horde's sphere of influence. The Russian lands to their east remained under the rule of the Golden Horde for centuries.

The Battle of Legnica is commemorated on the Tomb of the Unknown Soldier in Warsaw, with the inscription "LEGNICA 9 IV 1241".

== See also ==
- Battle of the Kalka River
- Battle of Mohi
- Golden Horde
- Mongol Empire
- Mongols
- Ögedei Khan
- Subutai
