= Włodzimierz of Cracow =

Voivode of Kraków

- Voivode

Voivode of Kraków
- Reign: c. 1238 – 18 March 1241
- Predecessor: Teodor Gryfita
- Successor: Klement of Ruszcza
- Native name: Włodzimierz z Krakowa
- Born: c. 1191
- Died: 18 March 1241 near Chmielnik, Kingdom of Poland

Włodzimierz of Cracow (Polish: Włodzimierz z Krakowa, Włodzimierz Krakowski, Włodzimierz Gryfita; c. 1191 – 18 March 1241) was a Polish nobleman who served as voivode of Kraków in the Seniorate Province from about 1238 until his death at the Battle of Chmielnik. In heraldic literature he has been variously associated with the Gryf and Łabędź coats of arms. Most recent genealogical studies link him with the Łabędź lineage descending from the palatine Piotr Włostowic. Before becoming voivode he held the castellanies of Brześć and Oświęcim.

== Origins and family ==
In older historiography Włodzimierz was usually counted among the Gryfit family of Lesser Poland. Antoni Małecki made him a brother of the Gryfite voivode Marek and a member of that clan. This reconstruction has been convincingly rejected by later genealogists, above all Marek L. Wójcik, who showed that the identification rests on a confusion of persons and on an overly broad use of the Gryf coat of arms in medieval records.

Modern studies place Włodzimierz among the Łabędź-related kin-group descending from the powerful palatine Piotr Włostowic. Within this milieu he belonged to the high aristocracy of Lesser Poland in the first half of the 13th century, closely connected with the ducal court in Kraków.

Some genealogical works further link him with the later voivode Klement of Ruszcza, usually regarded as his nephew, which would explain Klemens's succession to the Kraków palatinate after Włodzimierz's death.

== Offices in Lesser Poland ==
According to the prosopographical lists of medieval officials, Włodzimierz is first attested as castellan of Brześć (in Lesser Poland) in 1232, a post he held until about 1234. By 1238 he had become castellan of Oświęcim, and in the same year he was promoted to voivode of Kraków, the highest secular office in the province.

As voivode he stood at the head of the ducal administration in the Seniorate Province during the reign of Duke Henry II the Pious, who often resided in Silesia. In practice this made Włodzimierz one of the chief decision-makers in Lesser Poland in the late 1230s and early 1240s.

== Role in the Mongol invasion of Poland ==
Włodzimierz's final years coincided with the First Mongol invasion of Poland. Narrative sources such as the 15th-century Katalog biskupów krakowskich, Jan Długosz's Annales and the Annales Silesiaci compilati place him at the head of the provincial forces of Kraków and Sandomierz during the campaign of 1241.

The Katalog reports that after the Mongols devastated Sandomierz, they were met near Tursko by the voivodes of Kraków and Sandomierz, Włodzimierz and Pakosław, and were initially driven off. Długosz, however, describes this encounter as a Polish defeat, a discrepancy discussed in detail by modern historians. In any case the engagement at Tursko did not stop the invasion, and the Mongol forces soon resumed their advance into Lesser Poland.

A second confrontation took place in March 1241 near Chmielnik. There Włodzimierz again led the Kraków host, together with forces from the surrounding lands. The battle ended in a crushing defeat for the Polish army. Włodzimierz was killed in the fighting, and the provincial leadership of Lesser Poland was largely wiped out. The traditional date of the battle, and thus of Włodzimierz's death, is 18 March 1241, although critical analysis of the sources has led some scholars to propose slightly different dates within that month.

Following the defeat at Chmielnik the road to Kraków lay open. Contemporary and later chronicles agree that the city was abandoned by much of its population and subsequently plundered and burned by the Mongol troops. In the aftermath Włodzimierz was soon succeeded in the Kraków voivodeship by Klement of Ruszcza, who continued the reorganisation of the province's defences.
