= Battle of Chmielnik =

1241 battle of the first Mongol invasion of Poland

- Part of the first Mongol invasion of Poland
Date	18 March 1241
Location	near Chmielnik, between Kraków and Kielce, Poland
Result	Mongol victory

Belligerents
Mongol Empire	Kingdom of Poland

Commanders and leaders
Baidar	Włodzimierz of Cracow †; Pakosław of Sandomierz †; Klemens of Brzeźnica †

Strength
Unknown	Unknown

Casualties and losses
Unknown	Heavy

The Battle of Chmielnik was fought on 18 March 1241 near Chmielnik, between Kraków and Kielce during the first Mongol invasion of Poland. A Mongol force under Baidar defeated a combined Polish army drawn from the Kraków and Sandomierz provinces, commanded by Voivode Włodzimierz of Cracow and other nobles. The destruction of the Polish army left the road to Kraków open. Later in March 1241 the Mongols captured and burned the largely abandoned city.

== Background ==
As part of the wider Mongol invasion of Europe, Mongol forces began operating against the Polish duchies in late 1240 and opened their main campaign in early 1241. A detachment advancing from Volodymyr-Volhynskyi crossed the frozen Vistula and on 13 February 1241 defeated Polish forces near Tursko and captured and burned Sandomierz.

Around this time the Mongol army split: the main column under Baidar advanced through Lesser Poland towards Kraków (Cracow), then the principal city and de facto capital of the fragmented Kingdom of Poland, while detachments under Kadan and Orda Khan operated further north in central Poland.

== Battle ==
Details of the battle were recorded in the chronicles of Jan Długosz. His account also contains the earliest surviving written reference to Chmielnik. At the time of the battle in 1241 the settlement was still a village; it would receive town privileges only in the mid-16th century.

Polish forces were commanded by Włodzimierz, voivode (palatine) of Kraków, and Pakosław, voivode of Sandomierz. They represented most of the knightly levies from the Kraków (Seniorate) Province and the Sandomierz Province of fragmented Poland. The Mongol force opposing them was commanded by Baidar. The duke of Kraków, Bolesław V the Chaste, withdrew from the area before the engagement and did not take part in the battle; contemporary and later narratives present his departure as damaging the army’s morale and prompting further withdrawals, leaving Włodzimierz and Pakosław with weakened forces.

In the initial phase of the battle the Polish army reportedly gained the upper hand, managing to push back the Mongols. Baidar then employed the classic Mongol tactic of a feigned retreat, drawing the pursuing Polish cavalry out of formation and away from its original positions. When the Polish troops advanced in pursuit, they were struck by Mongol reinforcements held in reserve and were enveloped and routed.

Polish casualties were very heavy. Norman Davies wrote that “at Chmielnik, the assembled nobility of Małopolska perished to a man”. Włodzimierz and Pakosław were killed, as were the castellan of Kraków, Klemens of Brzeźnica, and the castellan of Sandomierz, Jakub Raciborowicz.

== Aftermath ==
Having withdrawn from the fighting, Duke Bolesław V the Chaste escaped south to Moravia. The destruction of the Kraków–Sandomierz army at Chmielnik left Lesser Poland virtually undefended. News of the defeat caused panic in the surrounding lands; many inhabitants abandoned Kraków and nearby villages, seeking refuge in Silesia, Bohemia or in forests and marshes.

When the Mongol forces reached Kraków later in March 1241 they encountered little organised resistance. Those residents who had remained took shelter on Wawel Hill or in fortified churches, while the main part of the town was looted and then set on fire. Some modern accounts date the burning of the city to Palm Sunday, 24 March 1241, while others place it a few days later at the end of March. After devastating Kraków and parts of Lesser Poland, the Mongol army continued west towards Silesia, where on 9 April 1241 it defeated the forces of Henry II the Pious at the Battle of Legnica.

In the modern town of Chmielnik there is a monument commemorating the battle.
