= Battle of Tursko =

1241 battle of the first Mongol invasion of Poland

- Part of the first Mongol invasion of Poland
Date	13 February 1241
Location	Tursko Wielkie, Poland
Result	Mongol victory

Belligerents
Mongol Empire	Kingdom of Poland

Commanders and leaders
Baidar	Włodzimierz of Cracow

Strength
1,000	1,000–2,000

Casualties and losses
Low	High, about 800

The Battle of Tursko (or Tursko Wielkie) took place on 13 February 1241, during the First Mongol invasion of Poland. It ended in the defeat of the Polish forces of the ziemia of Kraków.

In early February 1241, Polish forces under the voivode of Kraków Włodzimierz blocked the road towards Kraków, concentrating in the area of Miechów. Meanwhile, Mongol forces headed towards Kraków via Koprzywnica, Wiślica and Skalbmierz, then withdrew to Tursko Wielkie. Following the order of the voivode, the Poles decided to pursue the Mongols. The Mongol commander Baidar was probably aware of it, using mock retreat to find a better position for the battle. According to Jan Długosz, the first clash ended in a Polish victory and the release of a number of prisoners. The second clash however, resulted in the complete defeat of the Polish knights. One of the reasons for the success of the Mongols' counterattack was that the Polish forces, having captured the Mongol camp, focused on looting it rather than worrying about the still significant enemy forces.

== Aftermath ==
Though the outcome was a decisive Mongol victory, the course of the battle is difficult to determine due to the unreliability of the Polish sources and absence of Mongol sources. In all probability, given how they conducted numerous other campaigns, the Mongols may have feigned a retreat and lured the Poles into overconfidence. Then the Mongols struck the Poles when they were disorganized, routed, and slaughtered them.

Remnants of fortifications were visible near Tursko until recently and were associated with a Mongol camp; the locals called this place "Zamczysko" ("castle remnants"). Construction of a monument commemorating the battle began in Tursko Wielkie in early 2012.
