= Baidar =

Mongol condottiero and son of Chagatai Khan

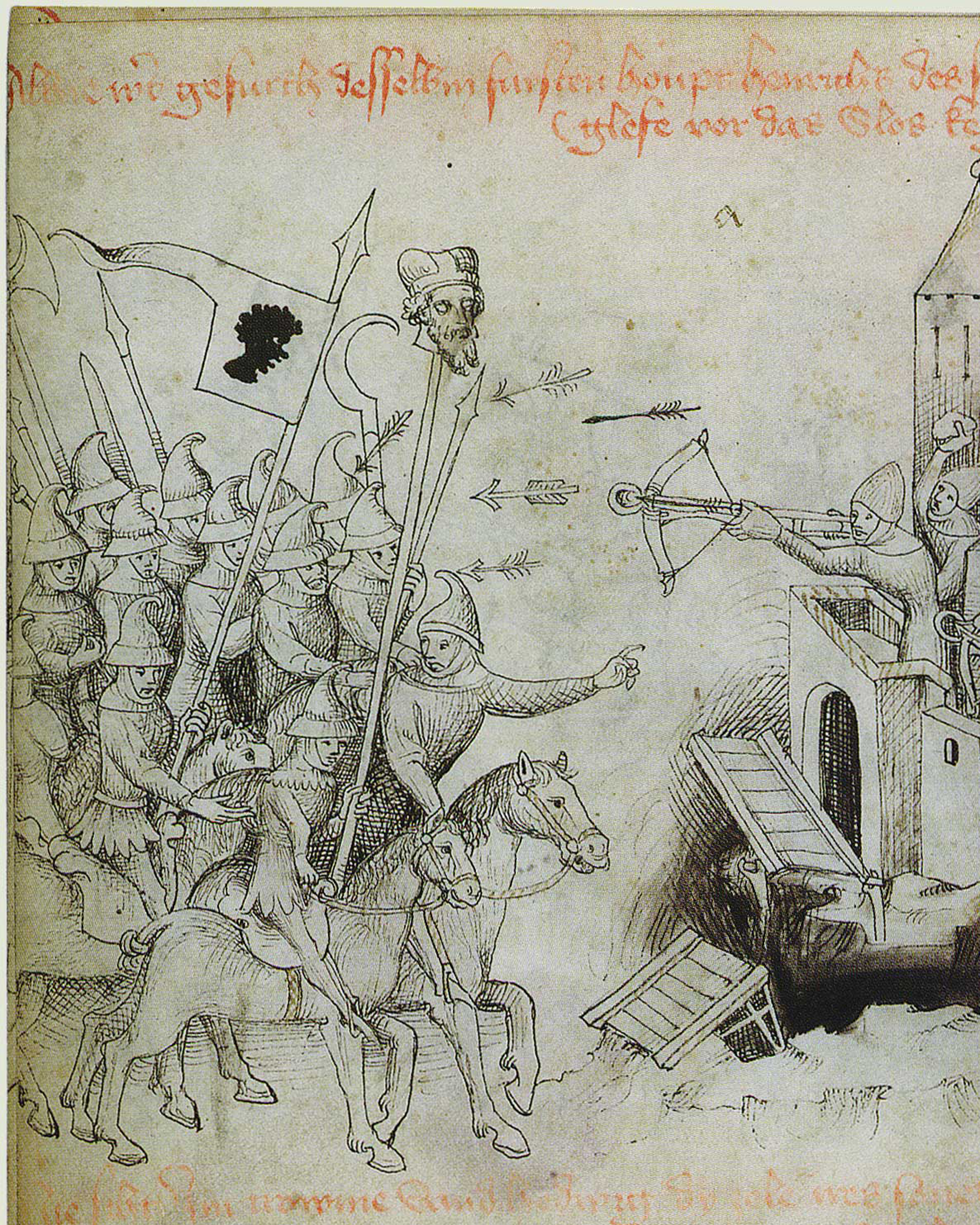
The Mongols under Baidar display the head of Henry II to terrorize Wroclaw

Baidar Khan, also known as Peta, was the sixth son of Chagatai Khan. He participated in the European campaign with his nephew Büri from 1235 to 1241. He commanded the Mongol army assigned to Poland with Kadan and, probably, Orda Khan.

Baidar defeated many Poles, Ruthenians, Germans and Moravians. On 13 February 1241 the Mongols crossed the frozen Vistula. The town of Sandomierz was taken and plundered. Further to the west, on 18 March Orda and Baidar met the Polish army under the command of Duke Bolesław V (not present at the battle) at the battle of Chmielnik. The Poles were heavily defeated and Boleslaw with a part of his troops fled to Moravia. On 22 March the Mongols stood before Kraków, many of whose inhabitants had already made their escape. On Palm Sunday the Mongols set the town on fire and took prisoner large numbers of the people who had remained. Moving further west, Orda and Baidar reached a place east of Opole, where they forced Duke Mieszko the Fat's army to retreat. Near Racibórz they crossed the Oder. Racibórz was burnt by its inhabitants when they left the town. Wrocław fell into the hands of the Mongols, although the citadel itself did not surrender. Their first assault against the fortress having failed, the Mongols wasted no time on a siege. They bypassed the citadel and pushed forward to the west.

After defeating a combined force of Poles, Czechs, and Templars at Legnica (see Battle of Legnica), Baidar camped for about two weeks in the neighbourhood of Otmuchów (between Opole and Kłodzko). Early in May 1241 they entered Moravia, then continued via Brno, to join Batu Khan's main army in Hungary. Although Bohemia remained unmolested, Moravia had much to endure. The destruction in Poland, Silesia and Moravia was all much of the same kind.

Baidar participated in the election of Güyük Khan in 1246.

== Children ==
Alghu, d. 1265 or 1266
