= List of voivodes of Kraków =

The List of voivodes of Kraków includes the positions in both Kraków Land (ziemia krakówska) and Krakow Voivodeship

- Skarbimir (Skarbek)
- Klemens 1123-1168
- Mikołaj Gryfita ?-1202
- Marek z Brzeźnicy 1176-? 1226
- Teodor Gryfita ?-1237
- Włodzimierz of Cracow 1191-1241
- Klement of Ruszcza ?-1256
- Klemens Latoszyński 1213-1265
- Sulisław z Branic 1232-1283
- Piotr Bogoria 1240-1290
- Mikołaj Łagiewnicki 1245-1290
- Wierzbięta z Ruszczy 1246-1324
- Tomisław Mokrski 1276-1326
- Mikołaj Bogoria 1291-1346
- Andrzej 1309-1354
- Mścigniew Czelej 1298-1357
- Imram 1312-1357
- Andrzej Tęczyński 1318-1368
- Dobiesław Kurozwęcki 1306-1397
- Spytko II of Melsztyn 1351-1399
- Jan z Tarnowa przed 1349-1409
- Piotr Kmita 1348-1409
- Jan Tarnowski 1367 -1433
- Piotr Szafraniec ?-1437
- Jan Czyżowski 1373-1459
- Jan z Tęczyna między (1408- 1410) - 1470
- Jan Pilecki 1410-1476
- Dziersław Rytwiański 1414-1478
- Jan Rytwiański 1422-1479
- Jan Amor Iunior Tarnowski 1425-1500
- Spytek III of Jarosław 1436-1519
- Piotr Kmita z Wiśnicza 1442-1505
- Jan Feliks Tarnowski 1471-1507
- Mikołaj Kamieniecki 1460-1515
- Krzysztof Szydłowiecki 1467-1532
- Andrzej Tęczyński ?-1536
- Otto Chodecki 1467-1534
- Jan Amor Tarnowski 1488-1561
- Piotr Kmita Sobieński 1477-1553
- Mikołaj Herburt Odnowski 1505-1555
- Stanisław Tęczyński 1521-1561
- Spytek Wawrzyniec Jordan 1519-1580
- Stanisław Myszkowski
- Stanisław Barzi 1529-1571
- Jan Firlej 1515-1574
- Piotr Zborowski
- Andrzej Tęczyński ?-1588
- Mikołaj Firlej 1532-1601
- Mikołaj Zebrzydowski 1553-1620
- Jan Magnus Tęczyński 1579-1637
- Stanisław Lubomirski 1583-1649
- Władysław Dominik Zasławski-Ostrogski 1618-1656
- Władysław Myszkowski 1600-1658
- Stanisław Rewera Potocki 1579-1667
- Michał Zebrzydowski 1617-1667
- Jan Wielopolski 1605-1668
- Aleksander Michał Lubomirski 1598-1677
- Jan Leszczyński 1598-1693
- Dymitr Jerzy Wiśniowiecki 1631-1682
- Andrzej Potocki ?-1691
- Feliks Kazimierz Potocki 1633-1702
- Hieronim Augustyn Lubomirski 1633-1706
- Marcin Kątski 1635-1710
- Franciszek Lanckoroński ok. 1645-1715
- Janusz Antoni Wiśniowiecki 1678-1741
- Jerzy Dominik Lubomirski 1665-1727
- Franciszek Wielopolski 1658-1732
- Teodor Lubomirski 1683-1745
- Jan Klemens Branicki 1689-1771
- Wacław Rzewuski 1706-1779
- Antoni Lubomirski 1715-1782
- Stanisław Kostka Dembiński 1708-1781
- Piotr Małachowski 1730-1797

== See also ==
- Voivodes of the Polish–Lithuanian Commonwealth
