= Gonzalo Ruiz =

Spanish general, diplomat and noble

Gonzalo Ruiz or Rodríguez (fl. 1122–1180 or 1146–1202) was the feudal lord of La Bureba (or Burueba) throughout much of the mid-twelfth century. He held important positions at the courts of successive Castilian monarchs and guarded the frontier with Navarre, to whose Jiménez rulers he was related. He was a cultured man, with connexions to at least one, possibly two, troubadours. He may have written poetry himself, though in what language is not known.

== Ancestry and marriages ==
Gonzalo was a son of Rodrigo Gómez (died 1146), Count of Bureba, and Elvira Ramírez, sister of García Ramírez of Navarre. His parents were married no later than 1137. He was grandson of count Gómez González, foremost noble and reputed lover of Urraca of León and Castile, and great-grandson of count Gonzalo Salvadores, a hero of the Lara family. Other families, notably the Girón, Sarmiento, and Sandoval, have attempted to claim him.

Gonzalo's first wife was Sancha Fernández, illegitimate daughter of Fernando Pérez de Traba and the Portuguese countess Teresa Alfonso. She had previously married Álvaro Rodríguez and then Pedro Alfonso. She was with the comes domnus Gunsalvus (lord count Gonzalo) in April 1178, when the two of them made a donation to the Knights Hospitaller. Gonzalo's second wife was an obscure woman named Estefanía (López?), who is only recorded in 1205. Gonzalo's only known child was a daughter, Elvira, who married Pedro Ruiz de Guzmán. Another woman, Mayor (died after 1232), who married Fernando Núñez de Lara (before 1203), may be a daughter of Gonzalo's.

== Political and military activities ==
As lord of La Bureba (tenente Boroviam), Gonzalo appears over fifty times in contemporary documents beginning in 1122. His sphere of activity was also very wide: he was in Burgos in 1144, he signed the fueros of Pancorbo in 1146, and in 1148 he was at Castro surit on 2 May and Burgos on 10 May. In all he appears in twelve different locations, besides León and Navarre as mentioned above. The numerous references to him in Alfonso VII's charters of 1147 suggests that he probably took part in the campaign against Almería that year. On 20 November 1148 he is recorded in connexion with the Lara family. On 15 February 1149 Gonzalo is referred to in a document as filius comitis, "son of the count", indicating the highest noble status for his father in Castile. From that year on he was active at the court of Sancho III, but appears to have ceased to govern La Bureba. In 1156 he was lord of La Bureba again and no longer alférez. In January 1158 he witnessed the king's granting of Calatrava to the newly founded Order of Calatrava. From then until 1165, during the minority of Alfonso VIII, he disappears from the record, but probably he was preoccupied by the invasions of La Bureba by both the Leonese and the Navarrese.

From 1165 to 1170 he was active throughout the kingdom as lord of La Bureba. According to Gerónimo Zurita, a Gonzalo Ruiz was in southern France in 1170, which is corroborated by two contemporary documents. This Gonzalo was part of a troupe of Castilian magnates and clerics charged with meeting Eleanor's entourage at Bordeaux and escorting her to Castile, through Aragon in the central Pyrenees because Navarre in the west was at war with Castile. This Gonzalo Ruiz was probably the lord of La Bureba, a merindad on the frontier with Navarre and consisting of the towns of Briviesca, Pancorbo, Valpuesta, and Oña.

He was the alférez del rey of Castile from 1149 to 1155, though a Navarrese document of September 1158 names a Gonzalo Ruiz who was the alférez of the king, seemingly of Navarre but possibly a reference to Sancho III of Castile. A Gundisalvus Roderici regis signifer (royal standard-bearer) appears in a Leonese document of 18 April 1171, but since this Gundisalvus Roderici appears in no other such document he is probably to be identified with the Castilian Gonzalo. The only other Gonzalo Ruiz who appears in documents of this period (1165–73) was a monk of Corias.

On 29 November 1171, Gonzalo signed a charter as "Gonzalo Ruiz de Bureba" for the first time. In 1173 he appears to have been granted the title of conde (count), the highest rank attainable at the time. Sometime after August 1175 Gonzalo was estranged from Alfonso VIII. He was at the Leonese court from 1176 to 1180. By 10 November 1180 he had reconciled with Alfonso, but he appears infrequently at court thereafter. He took to patronising religious foundations: a Cistercian monastery at Burgos received a donation on 13 September 1185 and the Benedictine monastery of San Salvador de Oña—the intellectual capital of La Bureba—received two in 1193 and 1201.

Just as there is confusion over the beginning of the career of Gonzalo Ruiz, there are some confusions over the date of his death. According to Walter Pattison, sometime in or shortly after 1180 Gonzalo entered the monastery at Oña, which he had patronised. There he died and was buried; his tomb is still visible in the claustro de los caballeros (cloister of knights). Simon Barton cites a document from August 1202 that records Gonzalo's presence. The death of a Count Gonzalo (Gundisalvus comes) is recorded under 1205 in the Annales Compostellani.

== Tenancies and estates ==
In 1182 Gonzalo mortgaged some property to the monastery of Oña for 321 pieces of gold. On 4 May 1184 he sold his estate at Rioseras to Marín and his wife, Sancha, for 62 maravedís. In 1197, 1199, and 1201 he sold estates to the priory of San Pedro de Tejada. In 1200 he mortgaged some more land to the San Pedro for 82 maravedís. In August 1202 he made a grant to Fernando Núñez and his wife Mayor Garcés in exchange for the estate of Belorado. Later that month Gonzalo sold Belorado to Alfonso VIII for 2,000 maravedís.

Gonzalo held several tenencias (tenancies) during his career. He was first recorded holding La Bureba on 8 March 1147, and he held it as late 1175. In 1177, while he was in exile in León, it was granted to Diego López II de Haro, but it was returned to Gonzal by 31 December 1180. He was still in possession of it in 1183. Other tenancies he is recorded as holding are Asturias (de Oviedo), Cabezón, Carrión, Liébana, Montenegro, Orna, Osma, Pancorbo, Pernía, Saldaña, Sarria, and Valdeprado. A Gonzalo Ruiz, probably the same one, received the tenancy of Lara in 1193.

== Relationship with the troubadours ==
In the song Chantarai d'aquest trobadors, a famous satire by Peire d'Alvernhe of twelve contemporary troubadours, one "Guossalbo Roitz" is listed among them. This name is the Occitanised form of the Old Spanish name "Gonçalvo Roiz", which is modern Spanish "Gonzalo Ruiz". Ruiz is not a surname but a patronymic meaning "son of Rodrigo (i.e. Ruy)". If Peire's satire was performed at Puivert before an audience that included the satirised troubadours and the entourage of Eleanor of England, who was passing through Gascony on her way to marry Alfonso VIII of Castile, then the identification of Guossalbo Roitz with Gonzalo Ruiz of Bureba becomes probable. Peire has this to say about his eleventh "victim" in lines 67 to 72:

E l'onzes Guossalbo Roïtz que.s fai de son trobar formitz tan que cavallairia.s fen; et anc per lui non fo feritz bos colps, tan ben no fon garnitz, si doncs no.l trobet en fugen.	And the eleventh Gonzalo Ruiz, who makes himself so satisfied because of his poetry that his knightly valour goes to pieces; and never was good blow struck by him, no matter how well he was armed, if indeed he did not happen on it while fleeing.

Peire is making fun of Gonzalo's well-known military career. In fact, Peire may have learned about Gonzalo on a trip he made to Castile in the spring of 1158. If he did not meet Gonzalo at the Castilian court, where Gonzalo undoubtedly was between January and February, then he may have met him at the meeting of Sancho III of Castile, Raymond Berengar IV of Barcelona, and Sancho VI of Navarre in the summer of that year.

Gonzalo Ruiz is also the name of a dedicatee of Quan vei pels vergiers desplegar, a sirventes of Bertran de Born, usually dated to the spring of 1184. This may be the same Gonzalo referred to in Peire d'Alvernhe's song, but Martí de Riquer i Morera suggests instead Gonzalo Ruiz de Azagra. This identity is strengthened by a reference in the poem to Pere Rois, probably Pedro Ruiz de Azagra, lord of Albarracín and the brother of Gonzalo de Azagra. Bertran's tornada goes like this:

Gossalbo Rois aprenda de Fraga e fassa chantar mo sirventes al rey navar e per Castella l'entenda.	Gonzalo Ruiz, learn from Fraga and do sing my sirventes to the Navarrese king and to Castile send it.

This poem is the second of two violent outbursts by Bertran against Alfonso II of Aragon in 1184. At that time Alfonso had allied with Richard the Lion-hearted and was at the side of the latter during the suppression of a rebellion in the Limousin—where Bertran was Richard's vassal—and Périgord. Fraga, which had been conquered by Raymond Berengar IV of Barcelona in 1149 (after two failed attempts by Alfonso the Battler) and divided between the Montcadas and a Templar barony, lay on the border of Catalonia and Aragon. Evidence from line 18 and from the song's razo suggests that perhaps the Quan vei was intended to be brought by Guillem de Berguedà, a Catalan troubadour and friend of Bertran and mutual enemy of Alfonso II, to Fraga and there transferred to Gonzalo.

Both Bertran's poem and Peire's attest the influence of the troubadours and their poetry on Navarre by the 1170s. If Gonzalo Ruiz is de Azagra, his brother's daughter, Tota Pérez, was married to Diego López de Haro—with whom the lord of La Bureba had a connexion—who was a great patron of troubadours. Rigaut de Barbezill, Peire Vidal, and Aimeric de Pegulhan all spent time at his court, as did Rodrigo Díaz de los Cameros, his son-in-law, one of the earliest Galician-Portuguese troubadours. Riquer attaches the Castilian embassy in France circa 1170 with Gonzalo Ruiz de Azagra.

Taken together these references to Gonzalo in two Occitan songs of the late twelfth century suggest that Gonzalo was a troubadour or at least a ioculator who could sing Occitan songs. Ramón Menéndez Pidal, in his Poesía juglaresca (1957), argued that "Gonzalvo Ruiz y Pedro de Monzón poetizaban en castellano, o acaso el de Monzón en aragonés" ("Gonzalo Ruis and Pere de Montsó wrote poetry in Castilian, or in the case of Montsó Aragonese").
