= 1083 =

1083 in various calendars
- Gregorian calendar: 1083; MLXXXIII
- Ab urbe condita: 1836
- Armenian calendar: 532; ԹՎ ՇԼԲ
- Assyrian calendar: 5833
- Balinese saka calendar: 1004–1005
- Bengali calendar: 489–490
- Berber calendar: 2033
- English Regnal year: 17 Will. 1 – 18 Will. 1
- Buddhist calendar: 1627
- Burmese calendar: 445
- Byzantine calendar: 6591–6592
- Chinese calendar: 壬戌年 (Water Dog); 3780 or 3573 — to — 癸亥年 (Water Pig); 3781 or 3574
- Coptic calendar: 799–800
- Discordian calendar: 2249
- Ethiopian calendar: 1075–1076
- Hebrew calendar: 4843–4844
- Hindu calendars
- Vikram Samvat: 1139–1140
- Shaka Samvat: 1004–1005
- Kali Yuga: 4183–4184
- Holocene calendar: 11083
- Igbo calendar: 83–84
- Iranian calendar: 461–462
- Islamic calendar: 475–476
- Japanese calendar: Eihō 3 (永保３年)
- Javanese calendar: 987–988
- Julian calendar: 1083; MLXXXIII
- Korean calendar: 3416
- Minguo calendar: 829 before ROC 民前829年
- Nanakshahi calendar: −385
- Seleucid era: 1394/1395 AG
- Thai solar calendar: 1625–1626
- Tibetan calendar: ཆུ་ཕོ་ཁྱི་ལོ་ (male Water-Dog); 1209 or 828 or 56 — to — ཆུ་མོ་ཕག་ལོ་ (female Water-Boar); 1210 or 829 or 57

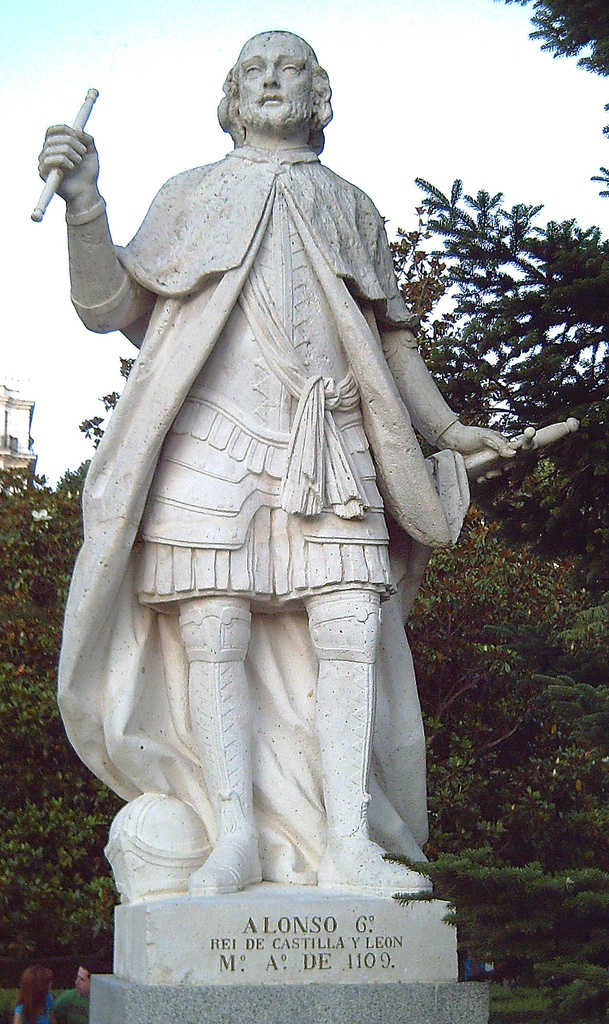
Alfonso VI of León and Castile (r. 1077–1109)

Year 1083 (MLXXXIII) was a common year starting on Sunday of the Julian calendar.

== Events ==
=== By place ===
==== Europe ====
- January 6 – A Castilian army, under Count Gonzalo Salvadórez and his son-in-law Ramiro Garcés, Lord of Calahorra, child of the late King García Sánchez III of Pamplona, enters the surrendered bastion of Rueda, but are then treacherously set upon and killed. Gonzalo, Ramiro, and Ramiro's illegitimate half-brother Sancho Garcés are among the many nobles to lose their lives, in what will be remembered as the 'disaster' or 'treachery of Rueda'.
- Summer – Henry IV, Holy Roman Emperor besieges Pope Gregory VII in Castel Sant'Angelo at Rome.
- October – While Robert Guiscard is in Italy, emperor Alexios I Komnenos retakes territory previously lost to the Normans, including the town of Kastoria. Several Normans, including Peter Aliphas, switch sides to the Byzantines.
- Reconquista: Castilian forces under Alfonso VI reconquer Talavera de la Reina in the Taifa of Toledo (modern Spain).
- King Sancho Ramírez of Pamplona and Aragon, conquers Graus (located in the Pyrenees).
- King William the Conqueror imprisons his half-brother Odo of Bayeux for planning a military expedition to Italy.

==== Africa ====
- Ceuta falls to the Almoravids, after a five-year siege.

== Births ==
- December 1 – Anna Komnene, Byzantine princess (d. 1153)
- Florine of Burgundy, French noblewoman and crusader (d. 1097)
- Li Gang, Chinese politician and Grand Chancellor (d. 1140)
- Qadi Iyad, Almoravid imam and chief judge (qadi) (d. 1149)
- Raymond du Puy, French knight and Grand Master (d. 1160)
- Shin Panthagu, Burmese Buddhist monk and primate (d. 1174)
- Viacheslav I Vladimirovich, Grand Prince of Kiev (d. 1154)
- Approximate date
  - Jindřich Zdík (or Henry Zdík), bishop of Olomouc (d. 1150)
  - Otto IV, count palatine of Bavaria (approximate date)

== Deaths ==
- January 6
  - Gonzalo Salvadórez, Spanish nobleman
  - Ramiro Garcés, Spanish nobleman
  - Sancho Garcés, Spanish nobleman
- January 11 – Otto of Nordheim, duke of Bavaria
- September 2 – Munjong of Goryeo, Korean ruler (b. 1019)
- November 2 – Matilda of Flanders, queen consort of England
- December 5 – Sunjong of Goryeo, Korean ruler (b. 1047)
- Adelelm of Jumièges, Norman monk and abbot
- Basil Apokapes (or Apocapes), Byzantine general
- Ermengarde of Tonnerre, French noblewoman
- Nicodemus of Palermo, Italian bishop and saint
- Touzi Yiqing, Chinese Zen Buddhist monk (d. 1032)
- Zeng Gong, Chinese scholar and historian (b. 1019)
- Approximate date – Theodora Doukaina Selvo, Venetian dogaressa (b. 1058)
