= Rodrigo González de Lara =

12th-century Castilian nobleman

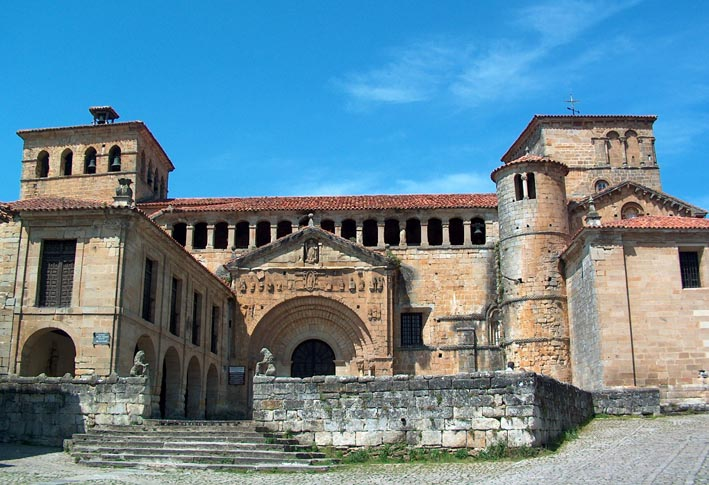
The Collegiate Church of Santillana del Mar, a Romanesque structure dating from Rodrigo's time. He made Santillana his headquarters during his rebellion in 1130.

Rodrigo González de Lara (floruit 1078–1143) was a Castilian nobleman of the House of Lara. Early in his career he ruled that half of Asturias allocated to Castile. He was faithful to the crown throughout the reign of Queen Urraca (1109–26), during which time he was married to the queen's half-sister and ruled a large part of the old County of Castile. He and his elder brother, Pedro González, led the opposition to Alfonso VII early in his reign (1126–57). He led a revolt in 1130 and was exiled in 1137. He was a leader in the Reconquista—about which the contemporary Chronica Adefonsi imperatoris has much to say—and also took part in the military activities of the Crusader states on two occasions. He travelled widely throughout Spain, but ended his days in Palestine.

== Youth under Alfonso VI (1078–1112) ==
Rodrigo was a son of Gonzalo Núñez de Lara and Godo Núñez, and kinsman of Gonzalo Salvadórez. Rodrigo's inheritance was modest.

A certain Rodrigo González who was alférez (standard-bearer) of Alfonso VI between 29 January 1078 and 9 June 1081 may have been Rodrigo González de Lara. If so, he was a very old man when he died. The alférez did sign the carta de arras (charter of bridewealth) of Rodrigo Díaz de Vivar, El Cid Campeador, in 1080/1. A Rodrigo González who signed eight royal diplomas between 1092 and 1099 has also been identified with the alférez, the son of Gonzalo Núñez, and the later Crusader.

== Governing the Asturias (1112–1130) ==
Rodrigo González de Lara first appears holding a fief (tenencia) from the crown on 29 February 1112, when he was governing all the Cantabrian region south of the river Miera, the valley of Mena, and Asturias de Santillana, formerly held by his cousin Rodrigo Muñoz. By 1119 he was ruling the Trasmiera, the region north of the Miera, which up until then had also been held by Rodrigo Muñoz. He is not recorded there after 1120, by which time his rule had extended westward over Aguilar de Campoo. At the same time he first appeared as governing "in Castile" (in castella), probably a reference to Old Castile; certainly he was not governing all of Castile. There are references to a "Count Rodrigo" governing Castile as early as 9 May 1112, but this may be Rodrigo Muñoz.

By 13 April 1121 Rodrigo was a count. In 1122 he made a donation to the Benedictine monastery of Santa María de Piasca. Sometime before 1122 Rodrigo married Sancha (born c.1101), a daughter of Alfonso VI and his fourth wife Isabel. They had three daughters: Elvira, Sancha, and Urraca.

Rodrigo confirmed a total of fifteen royal charters during Urraca's reign. It was during the final six years of Urraca's reign, a period of general peace, that Rodrigo held power in the Kingdom of León. As early as 1120 he was governing Liébana, and by 1122 he was also governing Nángulo, Piedras Negras, and the Tierra de Campos. By 1125 he was ruling Pernía as well. A private document dated 17 June 1126 refers to both Rodrigo and Pedro as holding Lara, Campos, and Asturias de Santillana, seemingly jointly. Their rule in none of these places can be traced after Urraca's death. On 10 May 1125 at Sahagún, Rodrigo and the queen made a joint donation of the monastery at Vega to the Order of Fontevraud. His wife Sancha was dead by that time, and Urraca, their youngest daughter, was put in the custody of Sancha Raimúndez, the king's sister.

== Rebellion against Alfonso VII (1130–1131) ==
There is a false document dated 18 April 1125 that names Rodrigo González as villicus imperatoris, that is, imperial majordomo. After the queen's death on 8 March 1126, the "towers of León", that is, the royal fortress in the city of León, refused to submit to her son, Alfonso VII, preferring the rule of Pedro González, who had been the queen's lover, and his brother Rodrigo, whom the author of the Chronica Adefonsi (I, §3) says "preferred war rather than peace with the King". Eventually the brothers were forced to make submission to Alfonso VII and did not do so willingly, as the other magnates:

Other counts saw that the King's power was increasing daily. They were the Castilians, Pedro de Lara and his brother, Rodrigo González, who lived in Asturias de Santillana. Gimeno Íñiguez was also present. He governed Coyanza in the territory of León. They were indeed frightened; and, as such, they directed their attention toward arranging a peace conference. However, their treaty with the King was made in a most insincere manner. Actually they preferred to follow the King of Aragón.

In 1127 he sold an estate at Arce to the parish of Santillana del Mar. There is evidence, in the former of a thirteenth-century copy of a private charter, that Alfonso tried to lure Rodrigo to his side by making him alférez in the winter of 1127–28. Despite their earlier submission, Pedro, Rodrigo, and their allies refused to join the army Alfonso assembled at Atienza in 1129 to fight Alfonso I of Aragon and Navarre. The king then relieved Rodrigo of his post as alférez, replacing him with Pedro Alfónsez. Early in 1130 he rebelled against the king. The rebellion seems to have been designed to place on the throne Fernando Pérez de Lara, Rodrigo's nephew, an illegitimate son of Pedro González and Queen Urraca. It had the support of Alfonso of Aragon and of his agent in Castile, Bertrán de Risnel, son-in-law of Pedro. While Pedro and Bertrán took the city of Palencia, and another relative of Rodrigo's, Jimeno Íñiguez, rebelled at Valencia de Don Juan, Rodrigo took up arms in Asturias de Santillana, the northwestern part of Castile. A minor noble, Pedro Díaz, rebelled from his castle of Valle. He was put down by the brothers Osorio and Rodrigo Martínez. By June the king had retaken Palencia and captured Pedro and Bertrán.

Having dealt with the other rebels, Alfonso turned to Asturias, where "he captured their fortified castles, set fire to their fields and hacked down their trees and vineyards." Forced to sue for peace, Rodrigo sent envoys requesting a meeting with the king on the banks of the Pisuerga. Per the agreement Rodrigo and Alfonso would each be accompanied by only six of their knights. During the meeting the king became so enraged by Rodrigo's "disrespectful remarks" that he seized him by the throat and they both fell from their horses. At this Rodrigo's retinue fled and the count was taken "as if he were a common prisoner." Rodrigo found his castles and tenencias confiscated, with Asturias placed in the hands of Rodrigo Gómez. There is a record of a comitem Rodericum Gundisalui de Asturias ("count Rodrigo González of Asturias") present on 3 November 1140 at the hearing of a dispute between the Bishop of Burgos, Ramiro, and the Bishop of Calahorra, Sancho, in the presence of the king, but it is probably unreliable. It is unlikely that Rodrigo ever regained his place in eastern Asturias. Within a few days of his being released (only after all his castles and fiefs had been received by the king), Rodrigo returned to acknowledge his crimes and seek mercy, which he received by the end of 1131, when he was appointed alcaide of Toledo in place of Gutierre Armíldez, who had died.

== Frontier rule (1131–1137) ==
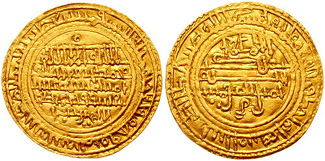
Gold Almoravid dinars like this one of Ali ibn Yusuf must have formed a substantial part of the booty Rodrigo returned from his major raiding expedition with in 1132.

Rodrigo "waged numerous wars against the Moors. He killed many and took many prisoners. He also carried away large quantities of booty from their lands." The author of the Chronica twice states that only a fraction of his military actions are recorded: "He had fought many battles in Moorish territory. The military experiences of Rodrigo González and Rodrigo Fernández against the Moors were indeed great, but they have not been described in this book." And "The other battles which the Consul Rodrigo fought with the king of the Almoravides are not recorded in this book."

Rodrigo's government in Toledo can be traced in the documents between 1132 and 1136, and he was also governor of Segovia in 1133. The Chronica Adefonsi (I, §23) records that Alfonso "entrusted Toledo to him and extensive territories on the frontier and in Castile" and (II, §119) "he was made commander of all troops in Toledo and leader of Extremadura." In June 1132 he gathered the militias of Ávila, Segovia, Toledo, and "the other cities under Toledo's jurisdiction" and combined this force of both cavalry and infantry with an even larger army drawb from Castile and Extremadura. He then led them in a raid into Muslim territory, down the valley of the Guadalquivir, devastating the environs of Seville. The Chronica Adefonsi notes that he "cut down the fruit trees". He took many captives and a large booty. The Almoravid governor (or king) of Seville, Umar, raised a large army from among his allies and fought Rodrigo in a pitched battle. Rodrigo divided his infantry into two groups, archers and slingers, and placed his bravest men at the front. The second line was composed of the militia of Ávila, which engaged an Arab wing, and the third of the militia of Segovia, which faced an Almoravid and Andalusion (native) wing. The militia of Toledo and the troops from the Trans-Sierra and Castile were left in reserve at the rear, under the personal command of Rodrigo "to reinforce the weak and to bring medical aid to the wounded." Umar was captured and ultimately beheaded. So important was this battle that it was recorded in three chronicles: the Chronica Adefonsi, the Anales toledanos primeros, and the Arabic chronicle of Ibn Idhari (who errs in dating it to 1130). The author of the Chronica, probably bishop Arnaldo of Astorga, quotes from I Maccabees 9 in describing an encounter he evidently considered of biblical proportions (II, §121):

The battle began as the Saracens shouted and sounded their brazen trumpets and drums. They uttered cries and invoked Mohammed. The Christians called out with all their heart to the Lord, to Mary and to Saint James. They prayed that they would show them mercy and forget the sins of the king and of their forefathers. Many on both sides fell wounded shortly after the battle had begun. Rodrigo realized that the King of Sevilla's army was the stronger. Consequently, all of the bravest warriors joined with Rodrigo and they attacked. The King of Sevilla fell in the field and died, as did many of his officers. Rodrigo González pursued the survivors all the way to the gates of Sevilla. After picking up the spoils, he began his march back to the camp.

The victory of Rodrigo inspired a contingent from Salamanca to go raiding in the region around Badajoz. Some muladíes, Muslims living under Christian rule, that had fled Rodrigo's camp had given away the Salamancans' position to the Almoravid sultan, Ali ibn Yusuf ben Tashfin, who promptly attacked and defeated him.

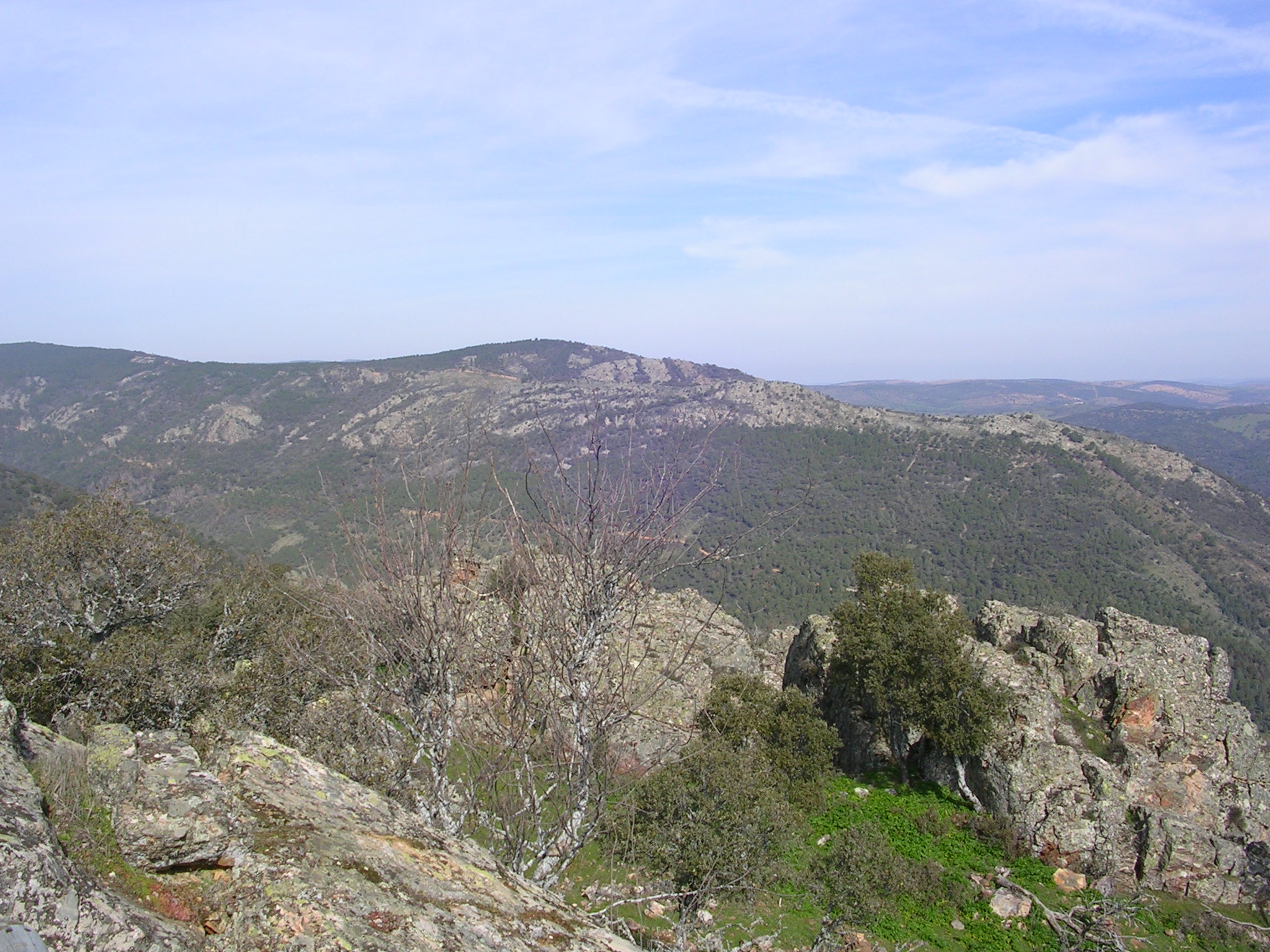
Despeñaperros Pass, through which Rodrigo led half the king's army in 1133.

In late May 1133 Rodrigo commanded half of the royal army marching out from Toledo. The army was divided "because there was not enough drinking water ... nor was there enough grass to feed the animals." Rodrigo led his forces through the Despeñaperros Pass. The two armies traversed uninhabited territory for fifteen days before meeting before the enemy castle at Galledo. Thereafter the army followed same route as in the previous year: the Guadalquivir valley as far as Seville, but then continued on to Jerez de la Frontera, which was sacked, and Cádiz, whose countryside was terrorised. The army returned to Toledo by late summer with a vast booty of camels, horses, cattle, sheep, and goats. In July 1135 Alfonso gave him and Rodrigo Martínez some properties confiscated from another rebel, the Asturian Gonzalo Peláez. One historian believes he regained the long lost fief of Asturias de Santiallana at about this time.

By July 1135 Rodrigo had contracted a second marriage to Estefanía, daughter of Ermengol V of Urgell and widow of the Castilian magnate Fernando García de Hita. Estefanía had received a carta de arras from her first husband on 12 November 1119, and she was widowed around 1125. Despite this, on 6 September 1135 Rodrigo praised his new wife for her youth in his carta de arras. On 7 September 1135 Rodrigo witnessed a donation of the churches of Tovar and Laguna by his eldest daughter, Elvira, and her husband, the brother of his new wife, Ermengol VI of Urgell, to the convent of Santa María de Valladolid. Estefanía bore Rodrigo two sons, Pedro and Rodrigo.

== Exile and wanderings (1137–1143) ==
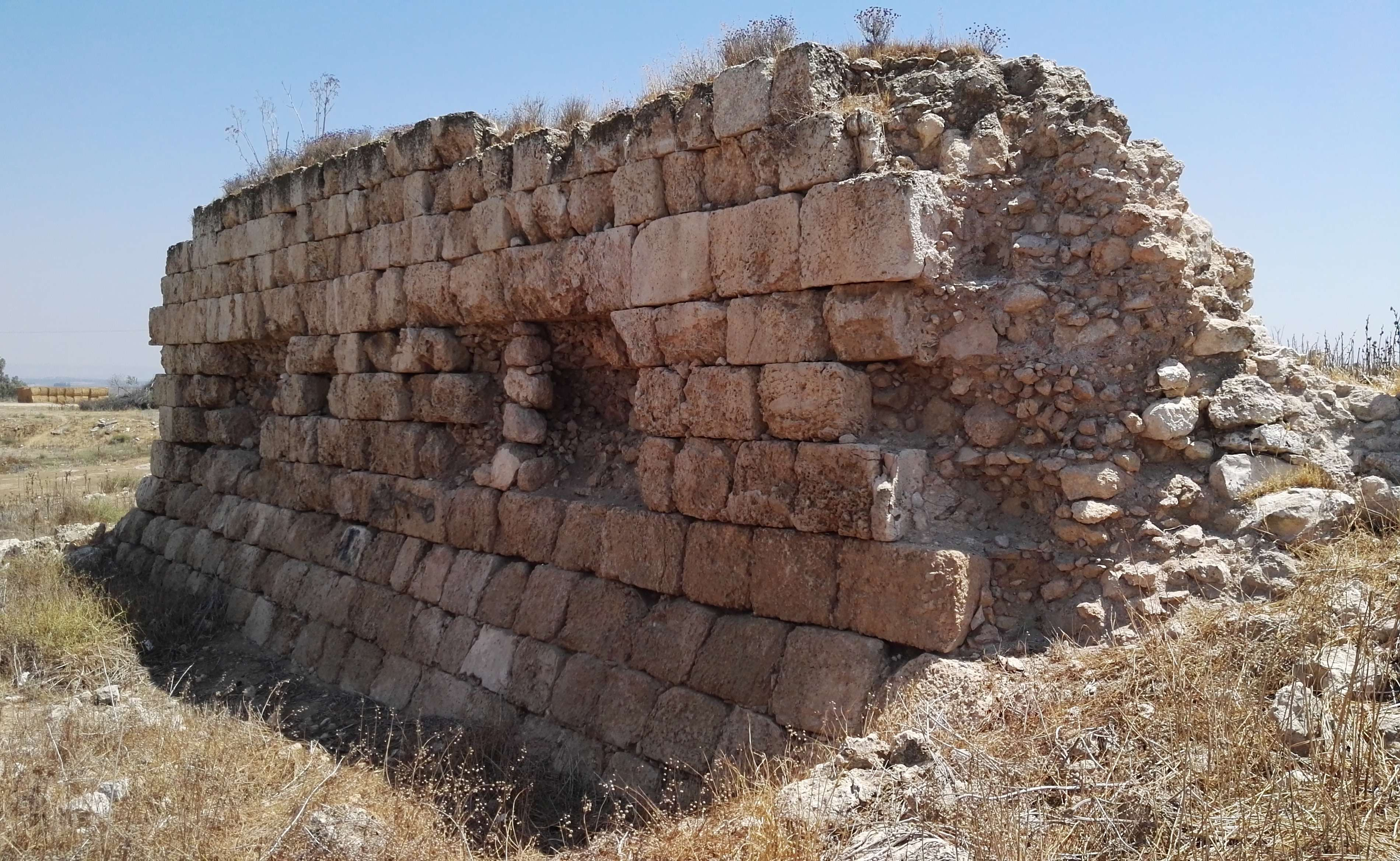
Ruins of the castle at Summil or Sumail, possibly identical with Toron, the castle built by Rodrigo in the Holy Land

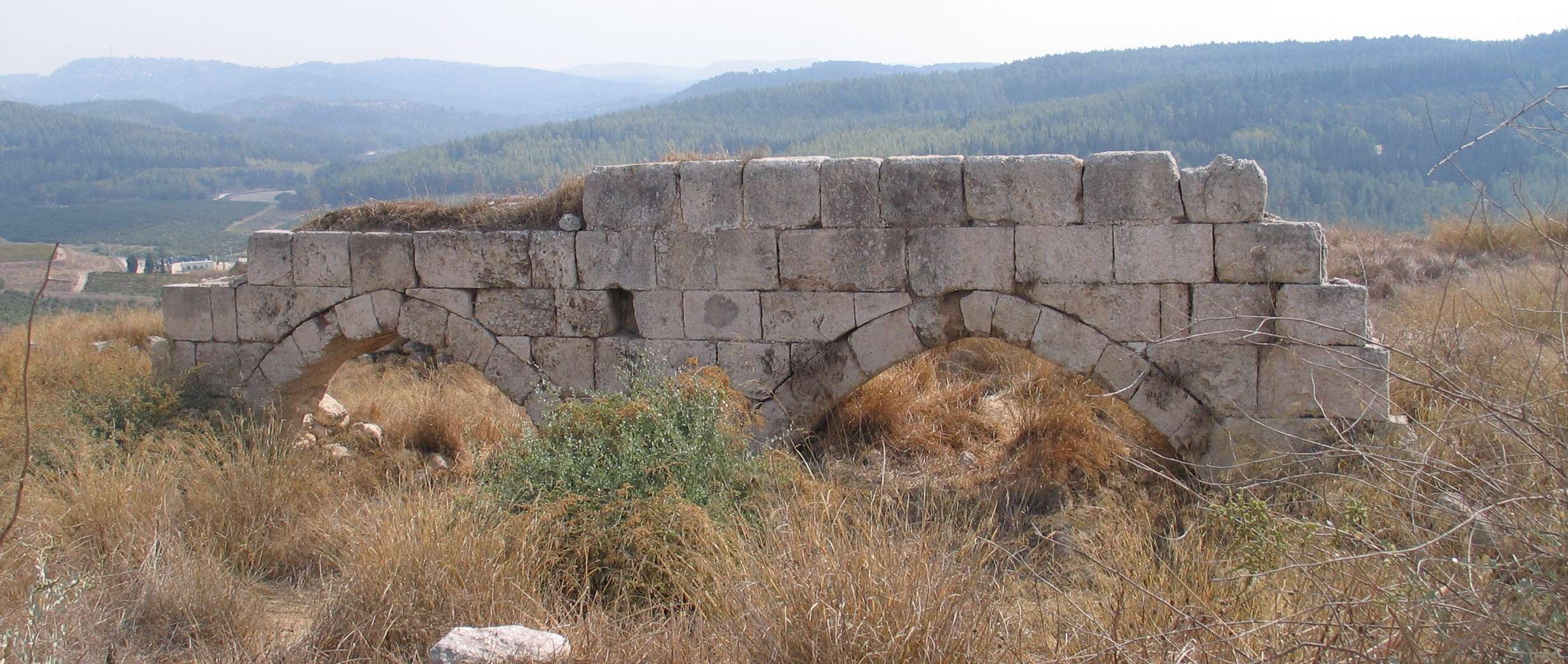
Ruins of the castle of Latrun, another candidate for being Rodrigo's Toron

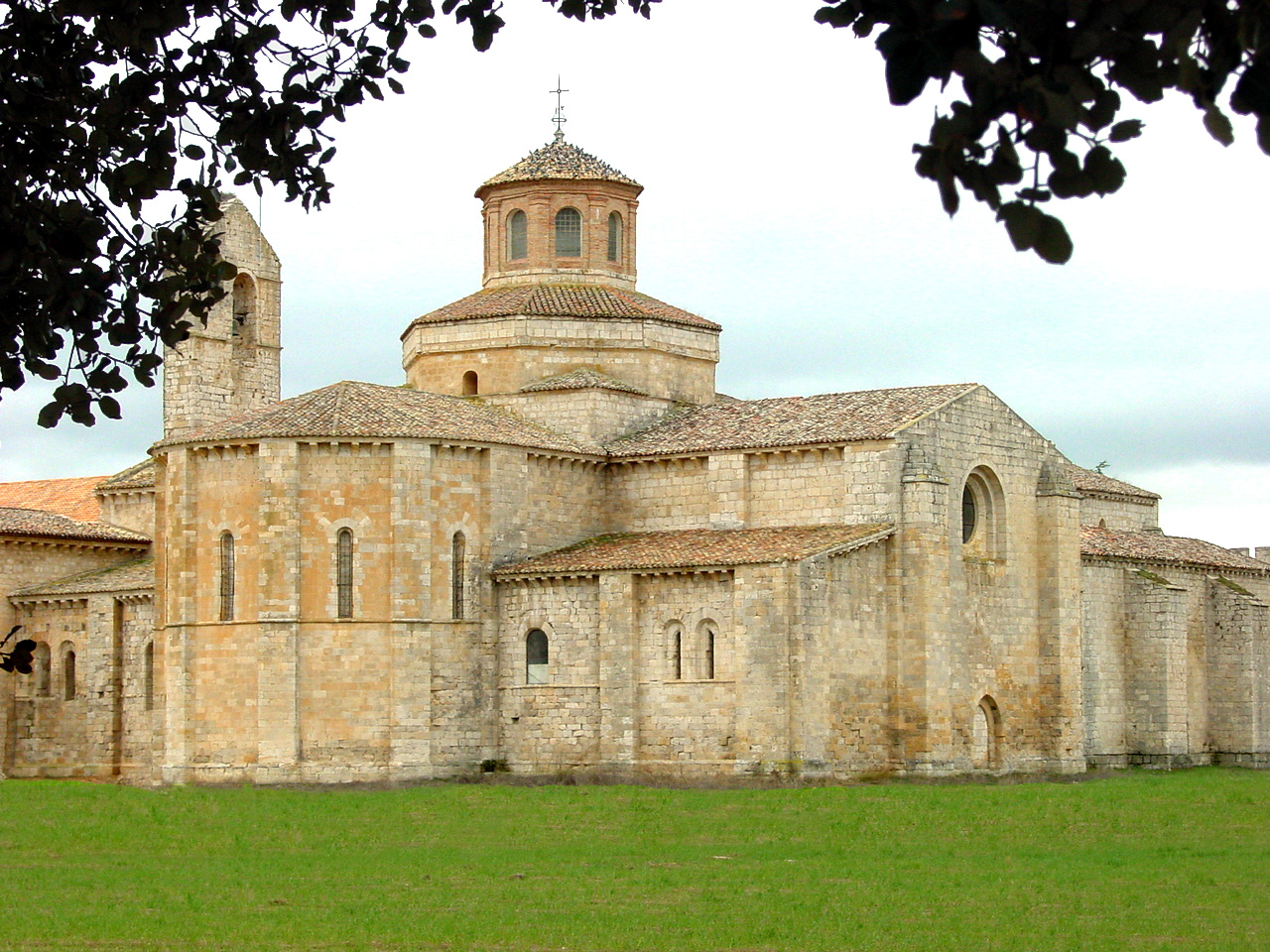
Monastery of Valbuena founded by Rodrigo's wife Estefanía shortly before his final pilgrimage to Jerusalem, on which she did not accompany him.

On 3 February 1137 Rodrigo made a donation to Segovia Cathedral. Shortly after, for reasons unknown, Rodrigo fell from favour and was exiled. According to at least one manuscript of the Chronica Adefonsi imperatoris, this occurred in October 1134, but documentary evidence seems to indicate that it actually took place in 1137. Of his own accord he surrendered Toledo and the other tenencias he held, which still included Aguilar and Old Castile according to royal documents date as late as 1 April 1137, to the king in person ("[he] kissed the King's hand in farewell and [took] leave of his comrades"). He decided to turn his exile into a pilgrimage ("he became a pilgrim and crossed the sea of Jerusalem for purpose of prayer", in the words of the Chronica), visiting Jerusalem and fighting the Muslims in the Holy Land for two years. He built the castle called La Torón (possibly the present-day Latrun) facing Ascalon, which was then still in Muslim hands. The Chronica says that he garrisoned it "with knights, infantrymen, and provisions, and he gave it to the Knights Templar." Rodrigo's Toron has been widely identified with the castle described elsewhere as le Toron des Chevaliers, a name shared by several castles, including the one later known as Latrun. However, Michael Ehrlich, specialist in medieval Mediterranean military history at Bar Ilan University, Israel, offers several good reasons to identify Rodrigo's castle with the ruins at Summil, c. 25 km inland (east) from Ascalon, which fits much better the one mentioned in the chronicles. In 1137 or 1138, Rorgo Fretellus, a canon of the church of Nazareth, dedicated his Description of the Holy Places to Rodrigo.

Rodrigo returned to Spain, via the Adriatic and Italy, in 1139, and, being barred from returning to Castile or his patrimonial lands, sojourned at various courts in the east of the peninsula. He served for a time Raymond Berengar IV of Barcelona, who made him lord of Huesca and Jaca between 1139 and 1141. He was later in the service of García Ramírez of Navarre and then the Almoravid governor of Valencia, Abengania. The Chronica Adefonsi says that while he only stayed a few days at Valencia, he contracted leprosy (from a "Saracen potion"). He did briefly return to Castile, where on 8 February 1141 he granted the village of Huérmeces to the Benedictines of Arlanza. He eventually made his way to the Urgell, where on 24 March 1143 he witnessed, as comes Roricus, the final will and testament of his brother-in-law and son-in-law, Count Ermengol VI. His daughter Elvira had probably died by then. Sometime in or after 1143 he returned to the Holy Land, and there he died. Shortly before her husband's death Estefanía founded a Cistercian monastery at Valbuena de Duero (15 February 1143). Her sons, unlike the sons of her husband's brother, never rose to as high a rank in the kingdom as their father had.

Historian Antonio Suárez de Alarcón owned several manuscript fragments of the Chronica, which were used by Enrique Flórez in amending the first published edition of the text by Francisco de Berganza. Alarcón himself had made extensive used only of those passages relating to Rodrigo González, since he had established the descent of the Marqueses de Trocifal from him in his Relaciones genealógicas de la casa de los Marqueses de Trocifal, Condes de Torresvedras (Madrid, 1656).

== Bibliography ==
- S. BARTON. "The Count, the Bishop and the Abbot: Armengol VI of Urgel and the Abbey of Valladolid." English Historical Review, 111:440 (1996), 85–103.
- S. BARTON. The Aristocracy in Twelfth-century León and Castile. Cambridge: Cambridge University Press, 1997.
- S. BARTON. "From Tyrants to Soldiers of Christ: The Nobility of Twelfth-century León-Castile and the Struggle Against Islam." Nottingham Medieval Studies, 44 (2000), 28–48.
- J. M. CANAL SÁNCHEZ-PAGÍN. "Don Pedro Fernández, primer maestre de la Orden Militar de Santiago: Su familia, su vida." Anuario de estudios medievales, 14 (1984), 33–71.
- J. M. CANAL SÁNCHEZ-PAGÍN. "Casamientos de los condes de Urgel en Castilla." Anuario de estudios medievales, 19 (1989), 119–135.
- S. R. DOUBLEDAY. The Lara Family: Crown and Nobility in Medieval Spain. Cambridge, Massachusetts: Harvard University Press, 2001.
- R. A. FLETCHER. Saint James's Catapult: The Life and Times of Diego Gelmírez of Santiago de Compostela. Oxford: Oxford University Press, 1984.
- E. FLÓREZ. "Anales Toledanos I." España Sagrada, XXIII, 381–400. Madrid: 1767.
- B. Z. KEDAR. "Iberia y el reino franco de Jerusalén." Ad Limina, 8:8 (2017), 39–61.
- G. E. LIPSKEY. The Chronicle of Alfonso the Emperor: A Translation of the Chronica Adefonsi imperatoris. PhD dissertation, Northwestern University, 1972.
- J. MONTENEGRO VALENTÍN. Santa María de Piasca: Estudio de un territorio a través de un centro monástico (857–1252). Valladolid: 1993.
- E. PASCUA. "South of the Pyrenees: Kings, Magnates and Political Bargaining in Twelfth-century Spain." Journal of Medieval History, 27 (2001), 101–120.
- J. PHILLIPS. The Second Crusade: Extending the Frontiers of Christendom. Yale University Press, 2007.
- J. F. POWERS. A Society Organized for War: The Iberian Municipal Militias in the Central Middle Ages, 1000–1284. Berkeley: University of California Press, 1987.
- B. F. REILLY. The Kingdom of León-Castilla under Queen Urraca, 1109–1126. Princeton: Princeton University Press, 1982.
- B. F. REILLY. The Kingdom of León-Castilla under King Alfonso VI, 1065–1109. Princeton: Princeton University Press, 1989.
- B. F. REILLY. The Kingdom of León-Castilla under King Alfonso VII, 1126–1157. Philadelphia: University of Pennsylvania Press, 1998.
