= Battle of Calatañazor =

Legendary battle in Spain

Coordinates: 41.7°N 2.816°W

The Battle of Calatañazor was a legendary battle of the Reconquista that supposedly took place in July 1002 in Calatañazor, in the Province of Soria, between an army of invading Moors under Almanzor and a force of Christian allies led by Alfonso V of León, Sancho III of Navarre, and Sancho García of Castile. Almanzor, who historically died the night of 10–11 August, is said to have died of wounds received in the battle. The battle has been branded as unreal since the 18th century because of the non-existence of any evidence in the chronicles of the time. Its ahistoricity was first demonstrated by Reinhart Dozy in 1881. The French Arabist Évariste Lévi-Provençal attributed the destruction of San Millán de la Cogolla by the Saracens to the campaign in Calatañazor.

== Sources ==
Of the death of Almanzor, only two Christian annalists mention. Both the Annales Compostellani and the Chronicon Burgense place it in the Era MXL, that is, 1002 AD (due to the 38 year differential between the Spanish Era dating system and the Anno Domini system). The first says only that he died (mortuus es Almozor), but the latter adds that he is in hell (et sepultus est in inferno). The notice of his death is amplified in the chronicles. Towards the beginning of the 12th century, the anonymous author of the Historia Silense wrote that he was killed in Medinaceli. Late that century, the Chronica Naierensis added that he was at war with Sancho García of Castile at the time of his death, which occurred while he was in retreat at the village of Grajal. He was buried in Medinaceli, but his body was later moved. The final story, of Almanzor receiving wounds in battle with the Christians and subsequently dying, is found in its earliest version in the Chronicon mundi of Lucas of Tuy. Lucas erroneously names the Christian leaders as Vermudo II of León (died 999) and García Fernández of Castile (died 995). Both Rodrigo Jiménez de Rada in his De rebus Hispaniae and Alfonso X in his Estoria de España follow Lucas in every detail save that of the fisherman apparition.

The only substantial Islamic account of the battle is that found in the 17th-century historian Ahmad al-Maqqari, based primarily on the medieval Spanish tradition. He adds that Almanzor ordered a large contingent of North African troops to join with those of Toledo for the campaign. He proceeded to devastate the Ribera del Duero before heading deeper into Castile. He was surprised by a Christian army in his camp near the castle called "The Eagles" (Las Águilas). He fell ill shortly after his defeat, perhaps from wounds received at the battle, but he continued to fight against Castile until he was being carried about on a litter. He was brought to Medinaceli, but the physicians were unable to diagnose his infirmity. He called his son, Abd al-Malik al-Muzaffar, to his bedside to give him instructions, but when he fled his father's tent in tears the dying general uttered the prophetic words, "This appears to me the first sign of the decadence that awaits the empire."

== Legend ==
Almanzor was finishing a campaign in Galicia when he decided to invade Castile. He assembled a large army at Calatañazor, where the Leonese and Castilians met him. Thousands of Muslims were slain and Almanzor himself escaped only because of nightfall:

. . . e en el lugar que se dize Calatanasor muchos millares de Sarrazines cayeron, et si la noche non cerrara el día, ese Almançor fuera preso. Enpero, en esse dia non fue vençido, mas de noche tomó fuyda con los suyos.	. . . and in the place called Calatañazor many thousands of Saracens fell, and if the night had not sealed the day, that Almanzor might have been captured. Therefore, that day he was not defeated, but at night he took flight with his own.

Under cover of darkness he fled with his retinue. The next day, Vermudo marched on the Muslim camp at dawn but found it abandoned and collected instead an enormous booty. García Fernández, having pursued the fleeing Muslims, came away with a large number of prisoners.

The same day as the battle in another part of Spain, a fisherman was seen exclaiming, first in Arabic then in Spanish, "In Calatañazor Almanzor lost the drum". Many Muslims came from Córdoba to see the fisherman, but every time they approached him, he disappeared before their eyes, only to reappear elsewhere repeating the same lament. Lucas of Tuy believed it was the devil lamenting the disaster of Calatañazor (el diablo que llorava la cayda de los moros). Almanzor never ate or drank after his defeat, and dying in Medinaceli, he was buried there.
