= Rodrigo Gómez (Castilian nobleman) =

Castilian nobleman (died 1146)

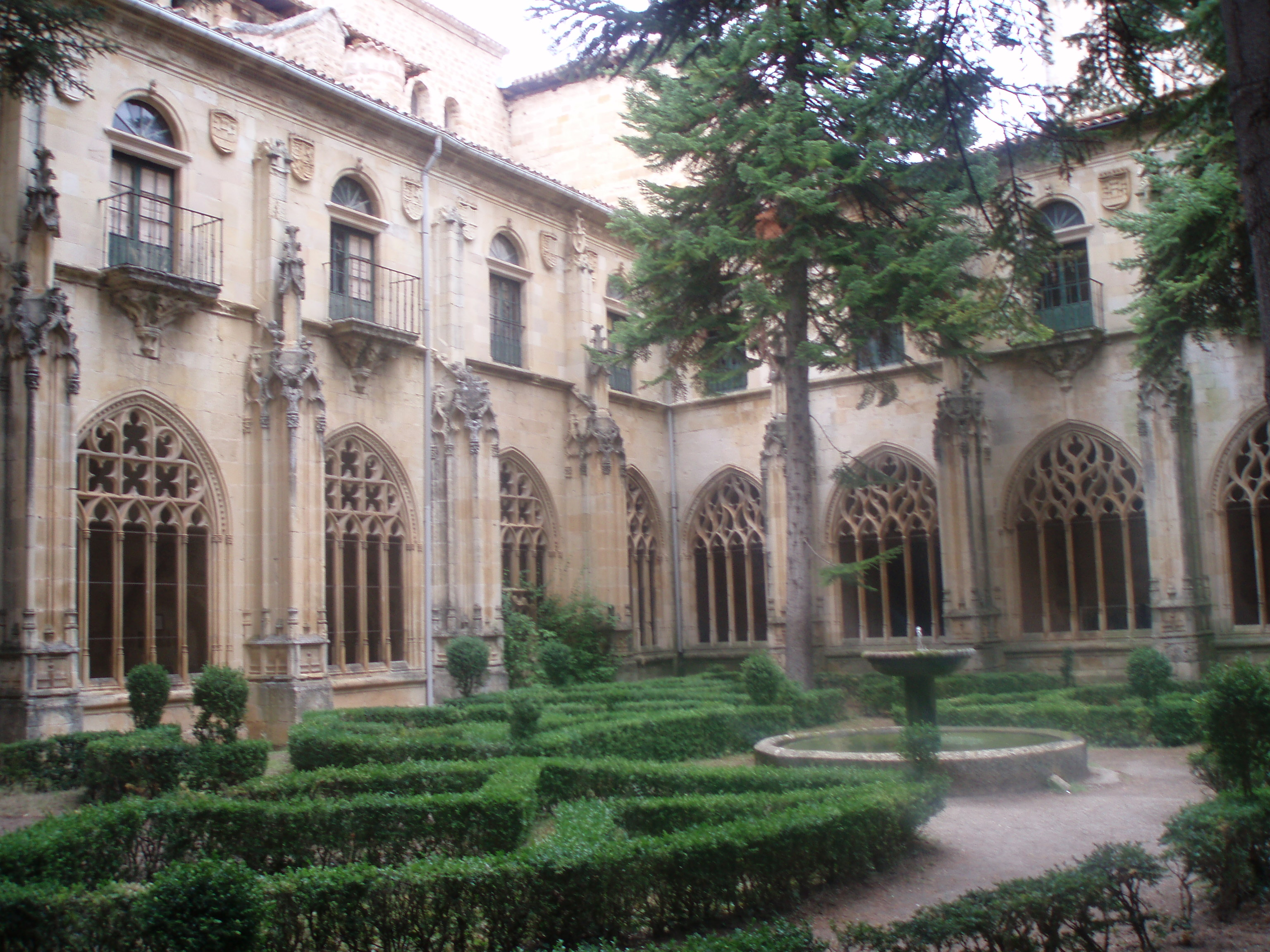
Courtyard of Rodrigo's favoured monastery of Oña. The Romanesque structure of Rodrigo's day can be seen in the top left.

Rodrigo Gómez (died 1146) was a Castilian nobleman and military leader under Alfonso VII. He governed large parts of Asturias and northern Castile, was involved in the politics with neighbouring Navarre, to whose royal family he was related by marriage, and took part in the Reconquista. Although he was rewarded for loyalty by his sovereign on more than one occasion, he did take part in one brief rebellion, led by a relative. His was a branch of the Lara family.

== Biography ==
Rodrigo was a son of Gómez González and Urraca Muñoz. He married Elvira, a daughter of the Navarrese infante Ramiro Sánchez, sometime before 1137, when they made a joint donation of their villa (palacio in contemporary records) at Villaverde to the monastery of San Salvador de Oña. In this donation Rodrigo expressed the wish that his gift would purchase eternal life for his lord, Alfonso VII. Elvira outlived her husband by several years, making another donation to Oña on 18 February, 1161 just before her departure on a pilgrimage to Jerusalem. The couple produced three sons, each of whom became counts: Álvaro, Gómez, and Gonzalo.

According to one historian, Rodrigo first appears in royal documents in 1119, eight years after his father's death at the Battle of Candespina (1111). Another historian cites a document of 13 February, 1121 in the archives of the monastery of Sahagún, a favoured royal residence, as his first public appearance. After the death of Queen Urraca on 8 March 1126, Rodrigo and his brother Diego were among the first to do homage to her successor, Alfonso VII. In this connexion, they are the first Castilians listed by the Chronica Adefonsi imperatoris, which says of Rodrigo postea ab eo factus est consul ("later made count by him [the king]").

On 17 June 1126, Rodrigo made a donation to the Benedictine monastery of San Pedro de las Dueñas. He made many other donations to the Benedictine monastery at Oña, both before and after his marriage (e.g. 1142).

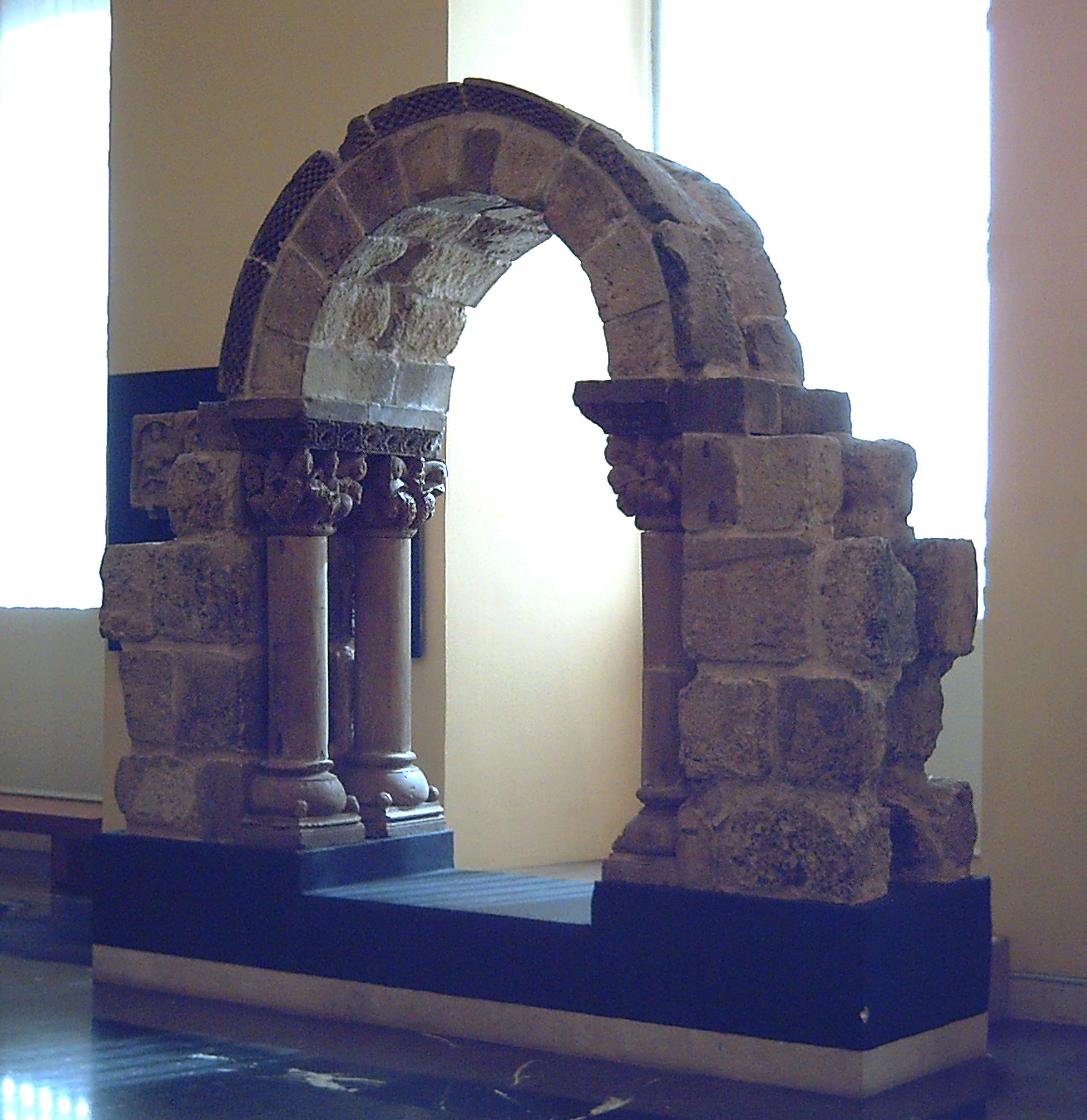
Preserved Romanesque arch from San Pedro de las Dueñas, sculpted in Rodrigo's own time. He made a donation to San Pedro in 1126.

Early in Alfonso's reign Rodrigo began to accrue positions in Castile. On 13 September 1129, he was holding Cervera and Mudá from the king. On 16 November 1129, he was recorded as holding Briviesca. After the rebellion of Rodrigo González de Lara in 1130, Rodrigo Gómez was his replacement as governor of Asturias de Santillana, although the first charter that records him as such dates to 2 December, 1131. He continued to govern that region for the rest of his life. He was also the recipient of royal largesse in October 1130.

By 1 June 1131, Rodrigo had been given the title count (comes or consul), the highest dignity in the realm. At the same time he is first mentioned ruling Bureba, which he held onto until at least 25 February 1144. His son Gonzalo would also rule Bureba for most of his career. A private charter from the abbey of San Salvador de Oña, dated to November 1129, shows Rodrigo as lord in that region. At about the same time, a royal charter of Alfonso I of Aragon and Navarre enacted at Briviesca on 10 October 1129, names Fortún Garcés Cajal as holding the tenancy of Bureba. These two charters indicate the contested nature of this frontier district. At a local level the king of León's man was recognised and active as tenant, but when the king of Aragon was present, his choice of tenant, in this case his most powerful magnate, was enforced.

In 1132, Rodrigo supported his kinsman, Gonzalo Peláez, then in revolt in western Asturias, and rapidly fell from favour. The king was assembling an army at Atienza for a war with Alfonso of Aragon and Navarre when he learned of the insurrection. He changed plans and led his army into Asturias, where he "seized [Rodrigo Gómez], and he stripped him of his honor and sent him away," according to the Chronica Adefonsi (I, §30). There is some dispute whether the Rodrigo of the rebellion was the same as the count, but if he was the latter he was soon restored. He was still at court on 28 May 1132 and had already returned to favour by January 1133.

On 19 December 1135, Rodrigo and his sisters, Sancha and Estefanía, made a donation to Oña for the sake of their late brother Diego's soul. On 21 November 1137, Alfonso VII granted Rodrigo a series of estates in gratitude for his loyal service, the events of 1132 apparently notwithstanding. By 14 September 1138, Rodrigo had been appointed governor of Belorado, a post which he held until 1144, at which time he also appeared briefly ruling Cerezo. In 1139, he participated in the Siege of Oreja throughout the summer and into the autumn.

On 22 February 1140, Rodrigo was witness to a treaty between Alfonso VII and Raymond Berengar IV of Barcelona at Carrión de los Condes. Later that year, Rodrigo, with Gutierre Fernández de Castro and a certain Lope López, waged war on García Ramírez of Navarre on behalf of Alfonso VII. García of Navarre was in fact Rodrigo's brother-in-law.

By 27 January 1141, Rodrigo was recorded as ruling Castile, a reference to Castella Vetula (Old Castile) in the north of the kingdom, territory which bordered Asturias de Santillana. He continued to hold it until his death. In 1142, he was appointed tutor or guardian of García, the youngest son of Alfonso VII. That same year Rodrigo confirmed the donation he and Elvira had made in 1137 of their villa at Villaverde to Oña, this time extending his hopes to include the eternal life of his ward García. The young García died in 1145.

In 1144, Rodrigo and Gutierre Fernández escorted the king of Navarre, against whom they had been fighting four years previous, from León to Pamplona with his new bride, Urraca, the daughter of Alfonso VII. The escorts were rewarded by García, as recounted in the Chronica Adefonsi (I, §94):

[At Pamplona] King García prepared a royal feast for the Castilians and for all the knights and officers of his kingdom. The celebration lasted several days. When it was over, the King gave magnificent gifts to the Castilian nobles, and each of them returned to his land.

The last document citing Rodrigo as ruling Asturias and Castile dates from 19 September, 1146. Shortly afterwards he made his last donation to Oña, on 21 September. The last reference to Rodrigo as still living dates to November 1146. According to the Chronicon Burgense he died that year. Surviving royal documents reveal that he spent most of his last year at court.

== Works cited ==
Primary

- The Chronicle of Alfonso the Emperor: A Translation of the Chronica Adefonsi imperatoris. Glenn Edward Lipskey, PhD dissertation, Northwestern University, 1972.
- Chronicon Burgense. España Sagrada, XXIII, 307–10. Enrique Flórez, ed. Madrid: 1767.

Secondary

- Simon Barton. The Aristocracy in Twelfth-century León and Castile. Cambridge: Cambridge University Press, 1997.
- Carlos Estepa Díez. "Frontera, nobleza y señoríos en Castilla: el señorío de Molina (siglos XII–XIII)" Studia historica: Historia medieval, 24 (2006), 15–86.
- Bernard F. Reilly. The Kingdom of León-Castilla under King Alfonso VII, 1126–1157. Philadelphia: University of Pennsylvania Press, 1998.
