= Ramiro Garcés, Lord of Calahorra =

Ramiro Garcés (died 6 January 1083) was the second son of king García Sánchez III of Pamplona and queen Stephania. He was a powerful nobleman in the region around Nájera and Calahorra and a major figure at the courts of both Navarre and Castile. He was ambushed and killed while trying to take possession of the castle of Rueda de Jalón during the Reconquista.

== In Navarre ==
Ramiro is first mentioned in a charter of his father's dated 18 April, probably 1052, as an infans, and he continued to appear as infans, during the reign of his brother, Sancho IV. He confirmed a charter on 11 March 1055, and another, a grant of Gomesano, Bishop of Calahorra, on 19 March 1058. On 20 July 1062 Ranimirus infans, Garsea rex prolis (infante Ramiro, child of king García) donated property to the prior of San Martín de Albelda, which was confirmed by the then lord of Calahorra, Fortún Garcés. The will of queen Stephania, dated 1066, bequeathed some property to Ramiro, who is referred to as in Sancto Stephano in a charter of Sancho IV's of 17 April 1072. He appears as domnus Ranimirus, dominator Sanacti Stefani (lord Ramiro, lord of Saint Stephen) on 6 August that year. He can be seen subsequently involved in the politics of the neighbouring Kingdom of Aragon, when he witnessed a charter of Garsias [...] Aragonensium episcopus (García [...] bishop of the Aragonese) introducing the Augustinian rule into the cathedral of San Pedro de Jaca (1076/9), using only the formula regis filius (son of the king).

== In Castile ==
In 1076 Sancho IV was assassinated, leaving infant heirs, and the kingdom's neighbors pounced on the opportunity. The western provinces were annexed by Alfonso VI of Castile while in Pamplona, the capital, Sancho Ramírez of Aragon was elected king by the nobles. Bernard Reilly believed that Ramiro became a ward of Alfonso VI at Nájera in June and July 1076, but as Ramiro must have been an adult this seems unlikely. He was certainly at the Castilian court by 3 September 1079, however, when he and his sister Ermesinda signed confirmed a charter of Aldefonsus (Alfonso) imperator totius Hispanie. Ermesinda married Fortún Sánchez, lord of Yarnoz, while Ramiro's other sister, Urraca, married García Ordóñez, a powerful Castilian magnate.

Ramiro appears as lord of Calahorra between 1076 and 1082. On 18 April 1081, Alfonso VI confirmed Ramiro's donation of property to Santa María la Real of Nájera, which his father had founded, and he donated a servant to San Martín de Albelda on 23 January 1082.

== Death ==
The circumstances surrounding Ramiro's death are narrated at length by the Historia Roderici. In December 1082 Albofalac, the governor of Rueda de Jalón, made a pronunciamiento in a favour of Yusuf al-Muzaffar, the imprisoned brother of al-Muqtadir, recently deceased ruler of Zaragoza, and rebelled against al-Mu'tamin, al-Muqtadir's son and successor. At the same time Ibn al-Royolo, who had brought Denia to al-Muqtadir in 1076, was now suspected of intriguing with Alfonso VI against al-Mu'tamin. Further, a recently failed embassy led by Sisnando Davidiz to the court of Zaragoza may have warmed Alfonso to the invitation of Albofalac to take part in his revolt, which he eventually requested. Alfonso sent an army under Ramiro Garcés and Gonzalo Salvadórez, lord of Lara. Ramiro and Gonzalo held talks with Yusuf, now free (Albofalac had been his jailer), who may have urged them to request the king's presence. Alfonso did appear, but only for a short while. After his departure, Yusuf suddenly died. Albofalac, through Ramiro, then invited Alfonso to take possession of his castle of Rueda, and the king sent Ramiro and Gonzalo under a safe conduct. When they and their men entered the castle, they were massacred by the garrison, who pelted them with stones. One of the nobles killed was Ramiro's half-brother, Sancho Garcés.

The disaster is placed in 1084 by the Annales Compostellani, Chronicon Iriense, Chronicon Burgense, and Annales Complutenses. The date of the Historia Roderici, however is confirmed by the Chronica Naierensis and has the support of Ramón Menéndez Pidal, Antonio Ubieto Arteta, R. A. Fletcher, and B. F. Reilly.

== Sources ==
- Barton, Simon. 1997. The Aristocracy in Twelfth-Century León and Castile. Cambridge: Cambridge University Press.
- Barton, Simon and Richard A. Fletcher, edd. 2000. The World of El Cid: Chronicles of the Spanish Reconquest. Manchester: Manchester University Press. ISBN 0-7190-5226-2.
- Catalán, Diego. 1966. "Sobre el «Ihante» que quemó la mezquita de Elvira y la crisis de Navarra en el siglo XI". Al-Andalus, 31(1): 209–35.
- Fletcher, Richard A. 1989. The Quest for El Cid. New York: Alfred A. Knopf. ISBN 0-394-57447-8.
- Reilly, Bernard F. 1988. The Kingdom of León-Castilla under King Alfonso VI, 1065–1109. Princeton: Princeton University Press.
