= Gómez González =

Castilian nobleman

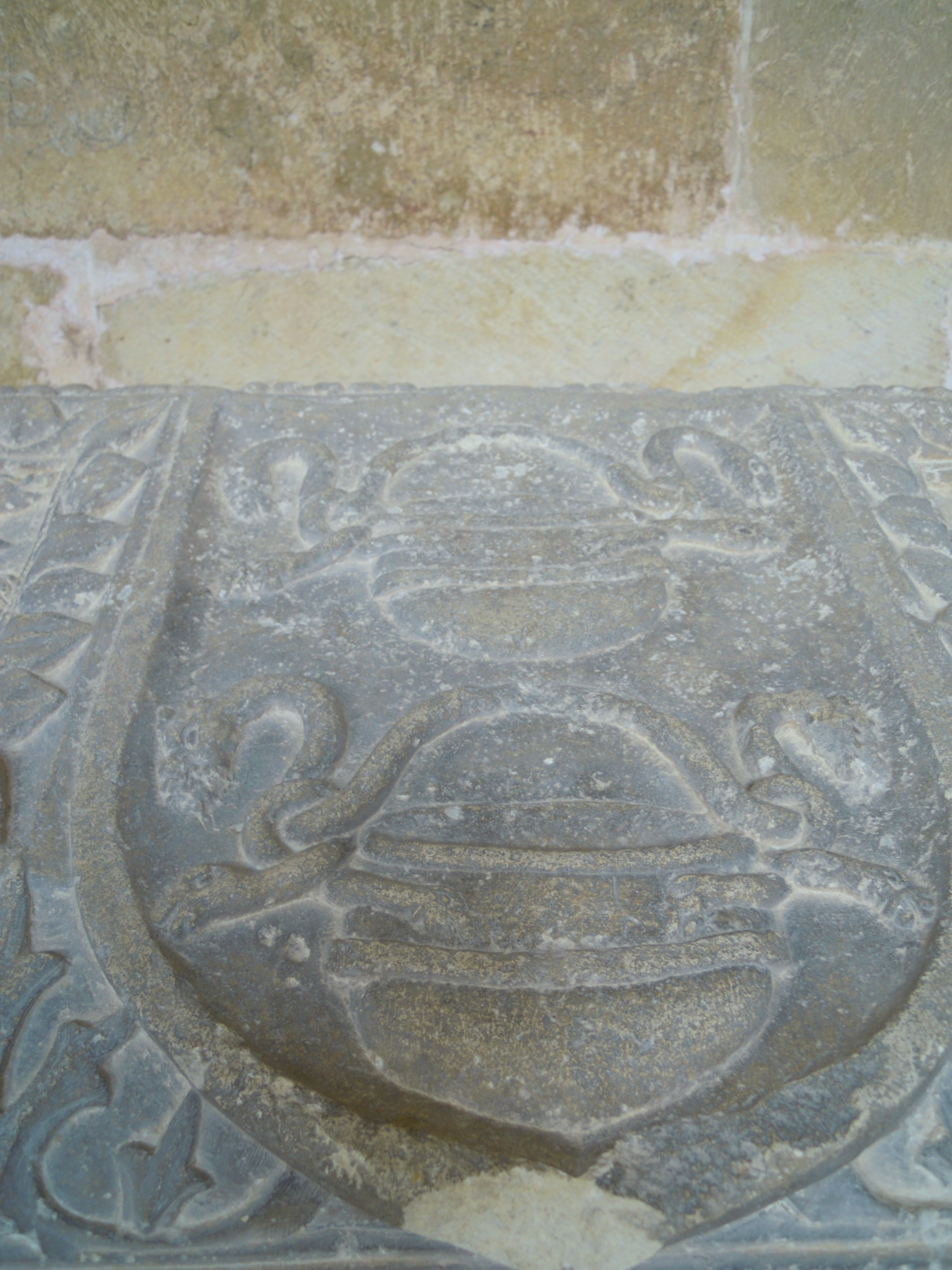
Non-contemporary decoration on sepulchre of count Gómez and his wife Urraca at the Monastery of San Salvador de Oña showing attributed arms.

Gómez González (died 26 October 1111), called de Lara or de Candespina, was a Castilian nobleman and military leader who had some claim to being Count of Castile. He was the eldest son and successor of Gonzalo Salvadórez and his wife Sancha, and thus kinsman of the Lara family. Like his father, he perished in battle.

== Early and personal life ==
Gómez first appears in the record in 1084, a year after his father's death. There exists a forged charter purporting to show Gómez, with the title Count, making a donation to the monastery of San Salvador de Oña in 1087. Donations to the same monastery by the same man, recorded in 1084, 1094, and 1099, are potentially authentic. It is unknown when he took a wife, but by 1107 he was married to a woman named Urraca Muñoz. She gave him two daughters and three sons: Diego, Stephanie (Estefanía), Rodrigo, Sancha and Gonzalo. After his death, she married Count Beltrán de Risnel.

== Possessions and titles ==
In 1090 he was given the government of the fiefdoms (tenencias) of Cerezo de Riotirón and Pancorbo, both of which he held until his death, and Petralata, which he held until 1106. By November 1092 Gómez had succeeded his own cousin, Pedro González, as royal alférez or armiger of Alfonso VI, a post he held until April 1099. By the beginning of 1099 he carried the high title of count (Latin comes), which was typically attained by a young nobleman after a stint as alférez. In 1097 he briefly appears with the fief of Poza and towards the end of his life (1110) he held Avià. His most significant fief was the Bureba, an important frontier zone bordering Navarre, and which his father had held before him. He was granted it in 1102 and held it until 1107. In 1107 Gómez made an endowment to the parish church of Busto.

== Liaison with Queen Urraca ==
In the summer of 1108, following the deaths of Raymond of Galicia (1107) and the heir apparent Sancho Alfónsez (at the Battle of Uclés in 1108, where Gómez may have been present), a marriage between Gómez and the new heir presumptive, Raymond's widow, Urraca, was proposed by a faction of bishops and nobles opposed to the king's plan to marry his heiress to Alfonso the Battler, the king of neighbouring Navarre and Aragon. At some point, perhaps as early as 1108, Gómez had an affair with Urraca that produced a son, Domingo Gómez, who was later to introduce the Premonstratensians into Spain when he founded a monastery at Montesacro c.1146, an establishment that was later moved by Alfonso VII to La Vid in 1152.

Gómez was one of the magnates who witnessed the first recorded act of Urraca as queen, on 22 July 1109, and implicitly acknowledged her claim to have been granted "the whole kingdom" (regnum totum) by her father, Alfonso VI, shortly before his death. This important document Gómez signed as castellanorum comes (literally, "count of the Castilians"), a title he had sometimes used in royal charters of Alfonso VI but which was mostly honorific, as the old County of Castile had become the Kingdom of Castile and was partitioned into several counties, with Gómez's zone of influence lying along the Navarrese frontier. His frontier position may explain his own opposition to Urraca's marriage, since he would have competed with the Aragonese when it came to expansion (reconquista) south of the river Ebro at the expense of the Almoravids.

In early 1110, Gómez was present with Urraca and the king of Aragon at the Monastery of Nuestra Señora de Valvanera, where he confirmed a pair of donation charters drawn up in the Aragonese format. By the middle of the year he was openly supporting Urraca against her husband.

== Death ==
Though he is last mentioned in a document of 15 October 1110, he was killed over a year later by Henry of Portugal, who had allied with the king of Aragon, at the Battle of Candespina, where he was leading Urraca's forces, on 26 October 1111. His death was a major blow to the queen's partisans. The short account of the battle in the Annales complutenses reads: "the Aragonese king Alfonso and count Henry killed the lord count Gómez in the field of Spina." An even shorter account in the Annales compostellani states simply that "they" killed count Gómez.

Gómez was succeeded as Urraca's lover by his kinsman Pedro González de Lara.
