= Chronicon Ambrosianum =

The Chronicon Ambrosianum (Spanish: Cronicón ambrosiano) or Chronica parva Ambrosianum ("short Ambrosian chronicle") is a set of exceedingly terse medieval Latin annals that, together with the Annales Compostellani and the Chronicon Burgense, forms a group of related histories. These were collectively labelled the Efemérides riojanas by Manuel Gómez-Moreno, who thought they had been compiled in La Rioja. The Chronicon is named after the Biblioteca Ambrosiana in Milan, where its manuscript was discovered. It was first published by Ludovico Antonio Muratori.

The Chronicon contains a list of ten feast days with the names of their saints and seventeen years, each described by one event. The first event, in Era 38, is the nativity of Jesus. Besides deaths, the only events mentioned are the Massacre of the Innocents (Era 47), the passion of Jesus (Era 69), the assumption of John the Evangelist (Era 108), and the prophesying of Mohammed (Era 656). The final year (Era 1208, that is, AD 1170), though it is placed out of chronological order, is the death of Thomas Becket. The last event in the list is the death of Juan de Ortega (Johannes de Urteca, Era 1201, that is, 1163).

== Editions ==
- In Ludovico Antonio Muratori, ed. Rerum italicarum scriptores, II (Milan: 1724), col. 1024.
- In Enrique Flórez, ed. España Sagrada, XXIII (Madrid: 1767), 304–5.
- In Miguel Bravo Tedín, ed. Efemérides riojanas. La Rioja: Editorial Canguro, 1992.
