= Sancho Garcés, Lord of Uncastillo =

Sancho Garcés
- Lord of Uncastillo
- Born: c. 1038
- Died: 6 January 1083
- Noble family: House of Jiménez
- Spouse: Constanza
- Issue: Ramiro Sánchez
- Father: García Sánchez III of Pamplona

Sancho Garcés (c. 1038 – 6 January 1083) was an illegitimate son of King García Sánchez III of Pamplona and first cousin of King Alfonso VI of León. Lord of Uncastillo and Sangüesa, he was the father of Ramiro Sánchez whose son García Ramírez was the first of a new dynasty of Navarrese monarchs.

== Biography ==
Sancho Garcés was an illegitimate son of King García Sánchez III and a concubine, born around 1038 and before his father married Stephanie. He was appointed tenant-in-chief of Uncastillo and Sangüesa and could have also been the Sancho Garcés who appears governing Ruesta (1058), Surta (1065), Autol (1071), and Anguiano and Tobía in 1073. He had several siblings born to his father's subsequent marriage, including King Sancho Garcés IV, Ramiro Garcés and Urraca, wife of count García Ordóñez. He was also the brother of another illegitimate child of the king, Mencía Garcés, wife of Fortún Ochoiz, though it is not known if Sancho and Mencía shared the same mother.

In 1083, he was a member of an army under the command of his brother Ramiro and count Gonzalo Salvadórez tasked by Alfonso VI with accepting the capitulation of the rebel Muslim castle of Rueda. In what became known as the 'disaster' or 'treachery of Rueda', the Castilian troops entered the surrendered fortress on 6 January 1083 only to be set upon by the garrison, who pelted them with stones, killing Sancho, Ramiro, count Gonzalo and many other nobles.

== Marriage, descendants, and legend ==
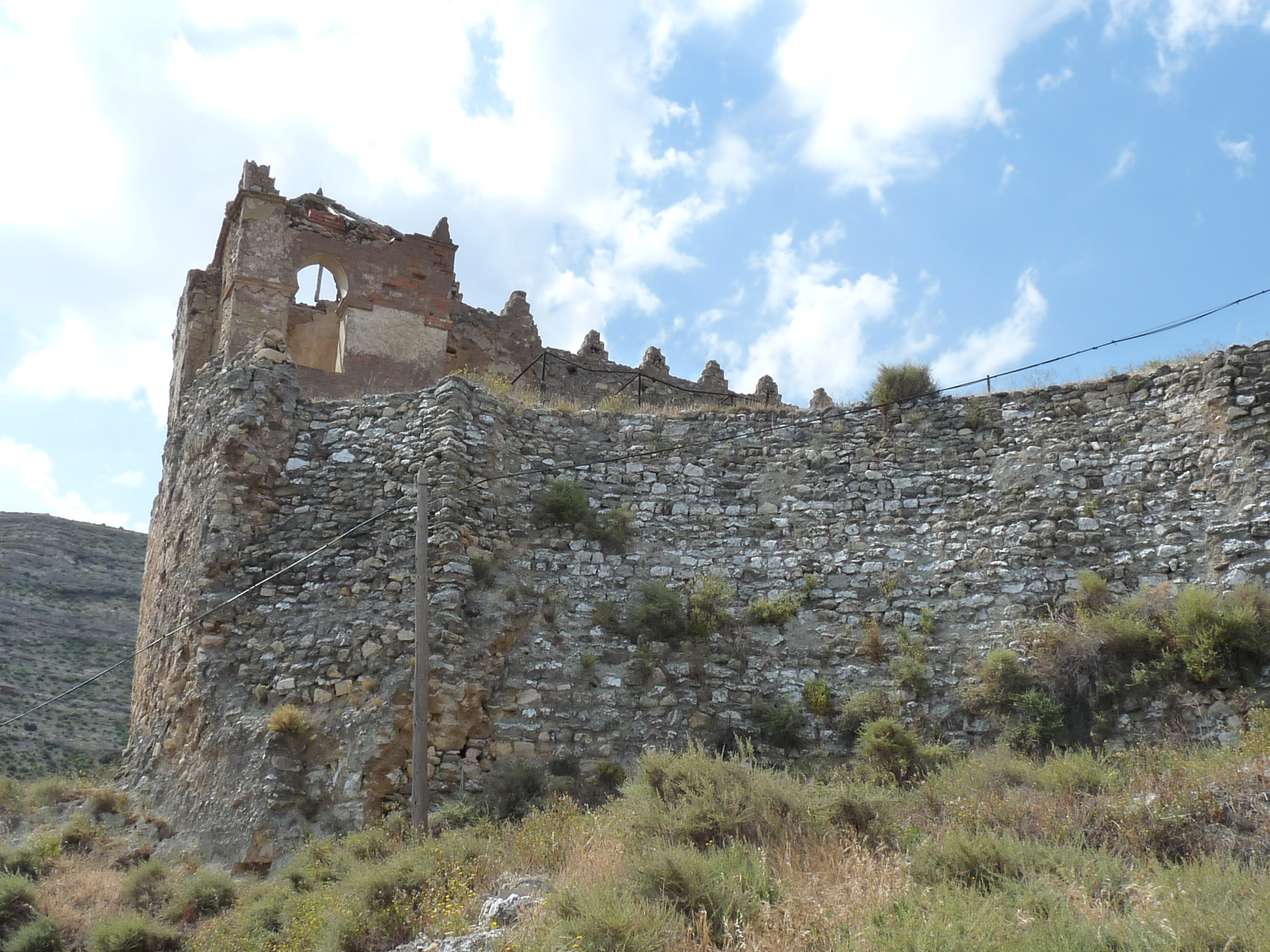
Wall and castle at Rueda de Jalón where Sancho Garcés and many nobles lost their lives.

He married his wife, Constanza, before 25 November 1057 as indicated in a document from the Monasterio of San Prudencio de Monte Laturce when both confirm a sale made by his brother the king. They appear together, two weeks later, on 7 December 1057 confirming as domno Santio testis et uxor eius domna Constanza in the Monastery of Albelda. Constanza was previously considered to be a daughter of a Gonzalo Marañón. Nevertheless, medievalist Jaime de Salazar y Acha, based on the Chronica Naierensis, believes that Constanza could have been a daughter of a previous marriage of Stephanie, wife of King García Sánchez III, Sancho's father:

King Sancho II of Castile was promised in marriage to a daughter of Queen Stephanie of Navarre whose name is not mentioned in the Chronica, and another Sancho, a bastard son of Stephanie's husband King García and a concubine, in an outburst of love abducted the bride when she was being escorted to meet her promised spouse, and took her to the court of the Moorish king of Zaragoza and later to the court of his uncle, King Ramiro who loved him as his own son. This sparked a war between the kings of Castile and Aragón and the death of the latter in the Battle of Graus in the year 1063.

Although this episode has been considered an unfounded legend, all the characters mentioned are documented and these events could have a basis of truth. In a charter dated 29 November 1074 recorded in the cartulary of the Monastery of Santa María de Otero de las Dueñas, King Sancho Garcés IV gives his brother some houses and land in Calahorra, declaring: vobis germano meo domno Sancio et uxori vestra vel germana mea domna Constancia, that is, "to you, my brother Sancho, and to your wife and my sister, doña Constanza".

Sancho and Constanza had two children:

- Ramiro Sánchez, Lord of Monzón, married to Cristina Rodríguez, daughter of El Cid and Jimena Díaz;
- Estefanía Sánchez, the wife of Leonese count Fruela Díaz.

Some historians have identified Sancho Garcés with Sancho Macerátiz, tenant-in-chief in Oca. Sancho Macerátiz married Andregoto, who descended from the family of Andregoto Galíndez, queen of Navarre, and she appears as his widow in 1075 at San Millán de la Cogolla, accompanied by her children: Sancho Sánchez de Erro, Andregoto, Sancha, Jimena, and Velasquita. However, Sancho Garcés is attested with his wife Constanza in 1074, leaving no time for a remarriage to Andregoto and the birth of her five children within just a year, and furthermore Sancho Garcés was still living seven years after Andregoto appears as widow of Sancho Macerátiz, indicating that the two men were distinct. He has also on occasion been confused with his like-named half-brother, King Sancho Garcés IV.

== Bibliography ==
- Balparda y las Herrerías, Gregorio de (1933–34). Historia crítica de Vizcaya y de sus Fueros; Tomo II, Libro III. El primer fuero de Vizcaya, el de los Señores (in Spanish). Bilbao: Imprenta Mayli. OCLC 634212337.
- Canal Sánchez-Pagín, José M. (1986). "El conde leonés Don Fruela Díaz y su esposa, la navarra doña Estefanía Sánchez (siglos XI-XII)". Príncipe de Viana (in Spanish). No. year 47, no. 177. ISSN 0032-8472.
- Flórez, Fernández; Antonio, José; Herrero de la Fuente, Marta (1999). Colección Documental del Monasterio de Santa María de Otero de las Dueñas, I (854-1108) (in Spanish). León: Centro de estudios e investigación «San Isidoro» (CSIC), Caja España de Inversiones y Archivo histórico diocesiano. ISBN 84-87667-39-2.
- Martínez Díez, Gonzalo (2007). El Cid histórico (in Spanish). Barcelona: Editorial Planeta, S.A. ISBN 978-84-08-07165-5.
- Montaner Frutos, Alberto (2011). "La Historia Roderici y el archivo cidiano: cuestiones filológicas, diplomáticas, jurídicas, e historiográficas". e-Legal History Review (in Spanish). No. 12. ISSN 1699-5317.
- Peterson, David (2005). ""De divisione regno": poder magnaticio en la Sierra de la Demanda en el siglo XI". Brocar: Cuadernos de investigación histórica (in Spanish). No. 29. pp. 7–26. ISSN 0214-4670.
- Salazar y Acha, Jaime de (2007). "Nuevos datos para la identificación familiar de la reina Estefanía de Pamplona" (PDF). Príncipe de Viana (in Spanish). No. 242. Pamplona: Gobierno de Navarra. Institución Príncipe de Viana. pp. 853–864. ISSN 0032-8472.
- Salazar y Acha, Jaime de (1994). "Reflexiones sobre la posible historicidad de un episodio de la Crónica Najerense" (PDF). Príncipe de Viana (in Spanish). No. 201. pp. 149–156. ISSN 0032-8472.
