= Calatañazor =

- Municipality
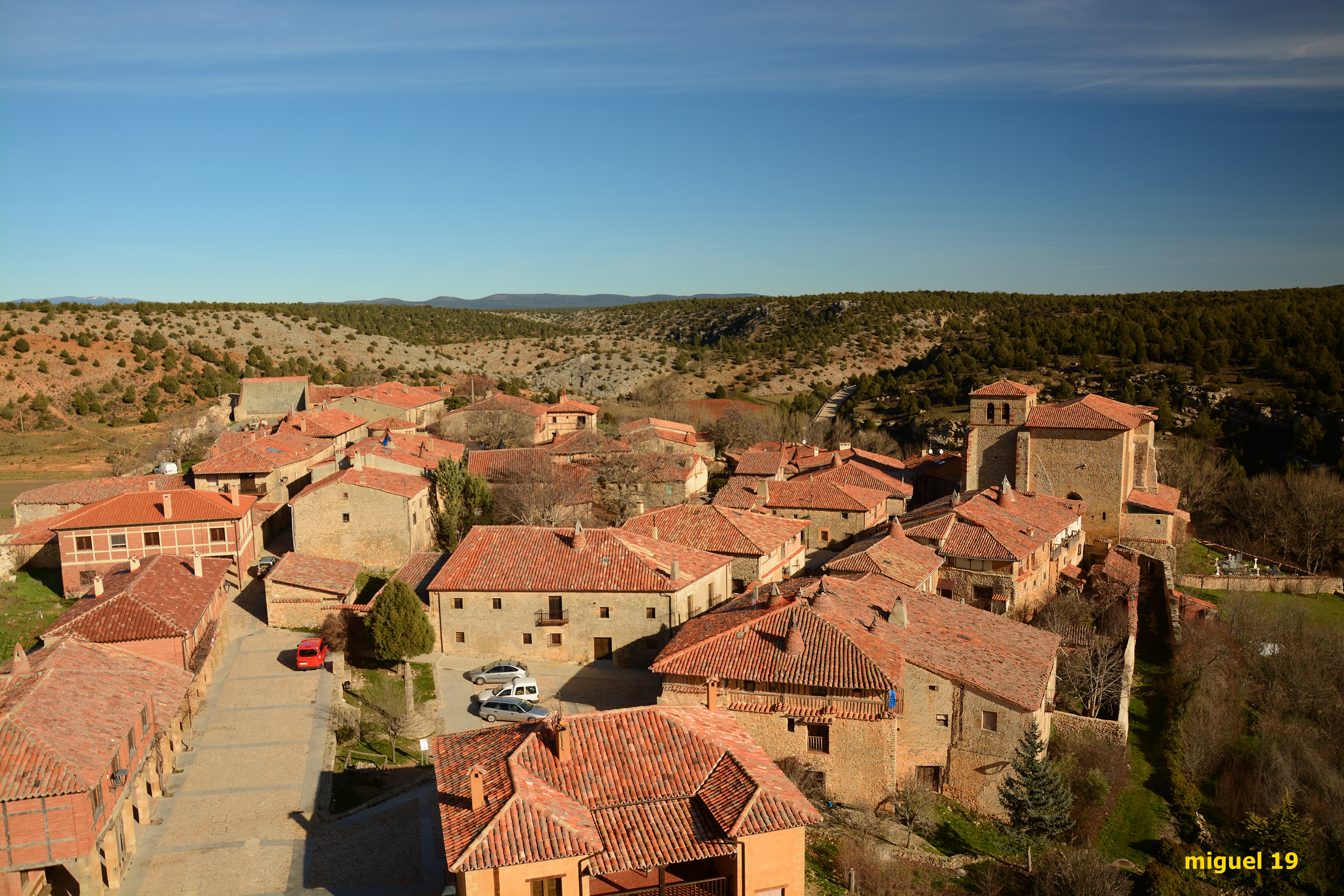

- Location in Spain. Calatañazor (Spain)
- Country: Spain
- Autonomous community: Castile and León
- Province: Soria
- Municipality: Calatañazor

Area
  - Total: 64 km^{2} (25 sq mi)

Population (2025-01-01)
  - Total: 43
  - Density: 0.67/km^{2} (1.7/sq mi)
- Time zone: UTC+1 (CET)
  - Summer (DST): UTC+2 (CEST)
- Website: Official website

Calatañazor is a municipality located in the province of Soria, Castile and León, Spain. According to the 2010 census (INE), the municipality has a population of 70 inhabitants. The municipality is named after the tiny fortified city on top of a hill.

Also situated in the municipality are the hamlets Aldehuela and Abioncillo. Abioncillo used to be abandoned like many forsaken hamlets in Spain, but in the 1980s was turned around by a few dedicated teachers into an educational center.

In the valley between Calatañazor and Abioncillo, the Battle of Calatañazor took place in 1002. This place is still named el valle de la sangre (the Valley of Blood). Almanzor, the ruler of Muslim Al-Andalus, is by some historians said to have died in the battle and was buried in Medinaceli. There is a statue of him in Calatañazor.

A certain kind of juniper tree, the Juniperus thurifera (Spanish juniper), grows in a close forest in the nature reserve of El Sabinar de Calatañazor. Some are the biggest to be found in the whole Iberian peninsula. Some more are found close to an underground river, the Abión, which surfaces at the Fuentona de Muriel, a natural heritage site. The Fuentona (spring) is often visited, especially by advanced cave divers. The locals call this spring El Ojo de la Mar (the eye of the sea). In the vicinity of Abioncillo, some 4000-year-old drawings are found in La Cueva Maja. Both in the center of Abioncillo and Calatañazor, some centuries-old elms can be found, as in Celt-Iberian times were an important symbol.

The name Calatañazor comes from the Arab Qalat al-Nusur which can either mean "Castle of Azure" or "Castle of Vultures".

== Gallery ==
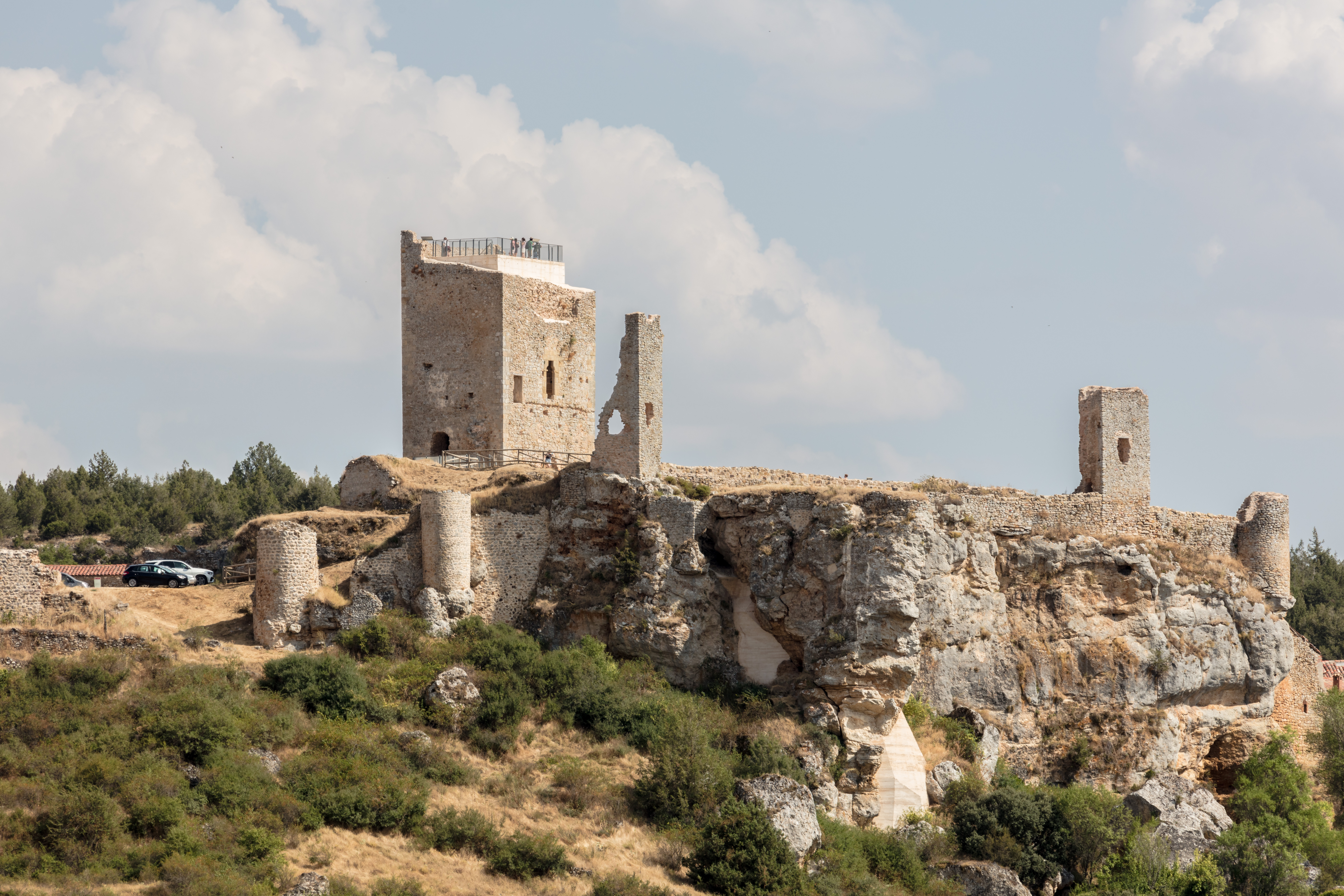
Remains of the former Castle of Calatañazor.

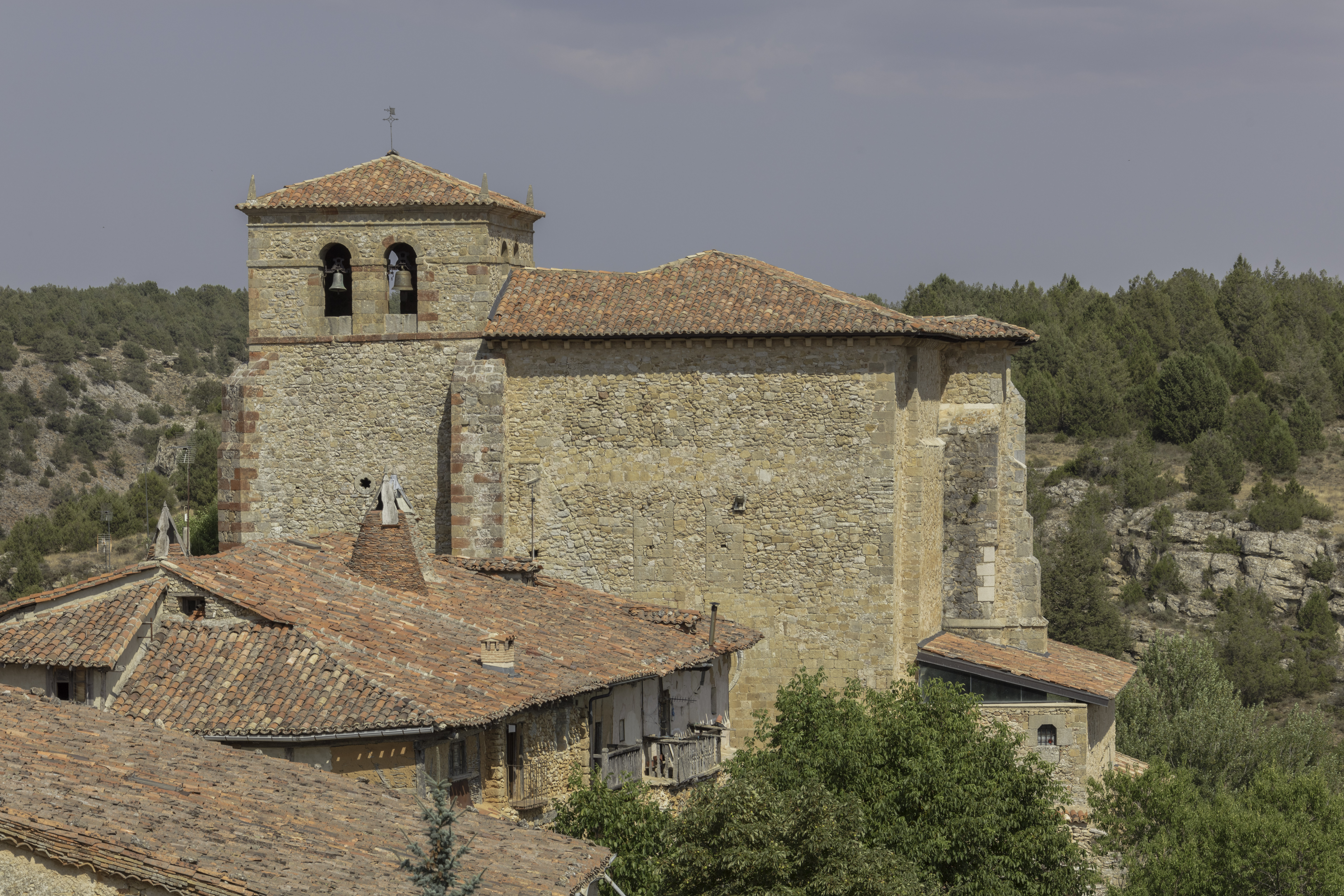
Church of Nuestra Señora del Castillo.

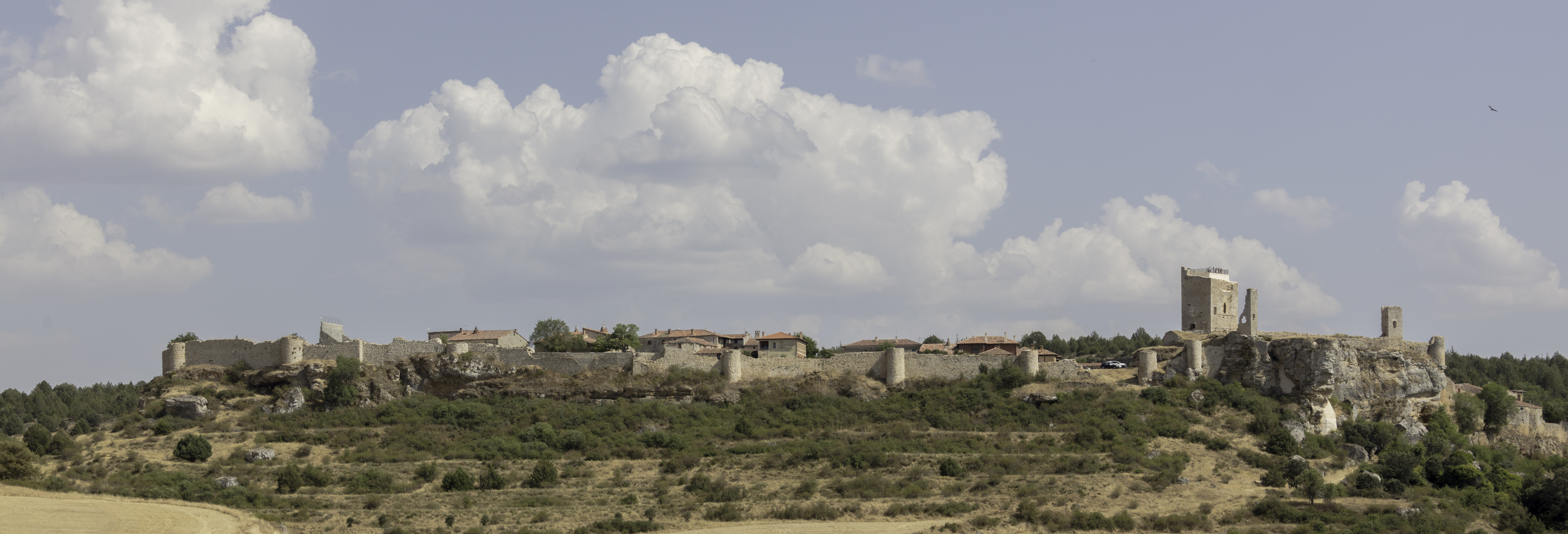
View of the medieval town of Calatañazor.

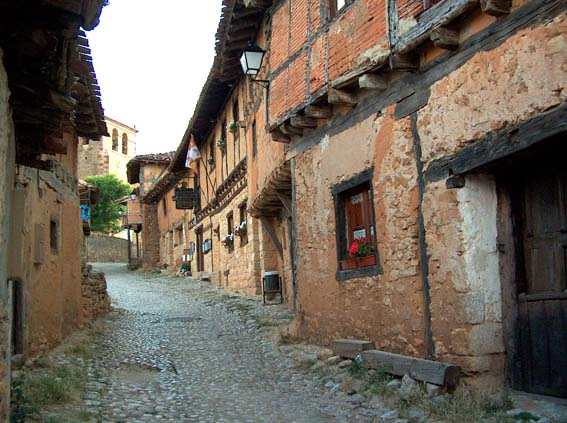
Typical street in Calatañazor.

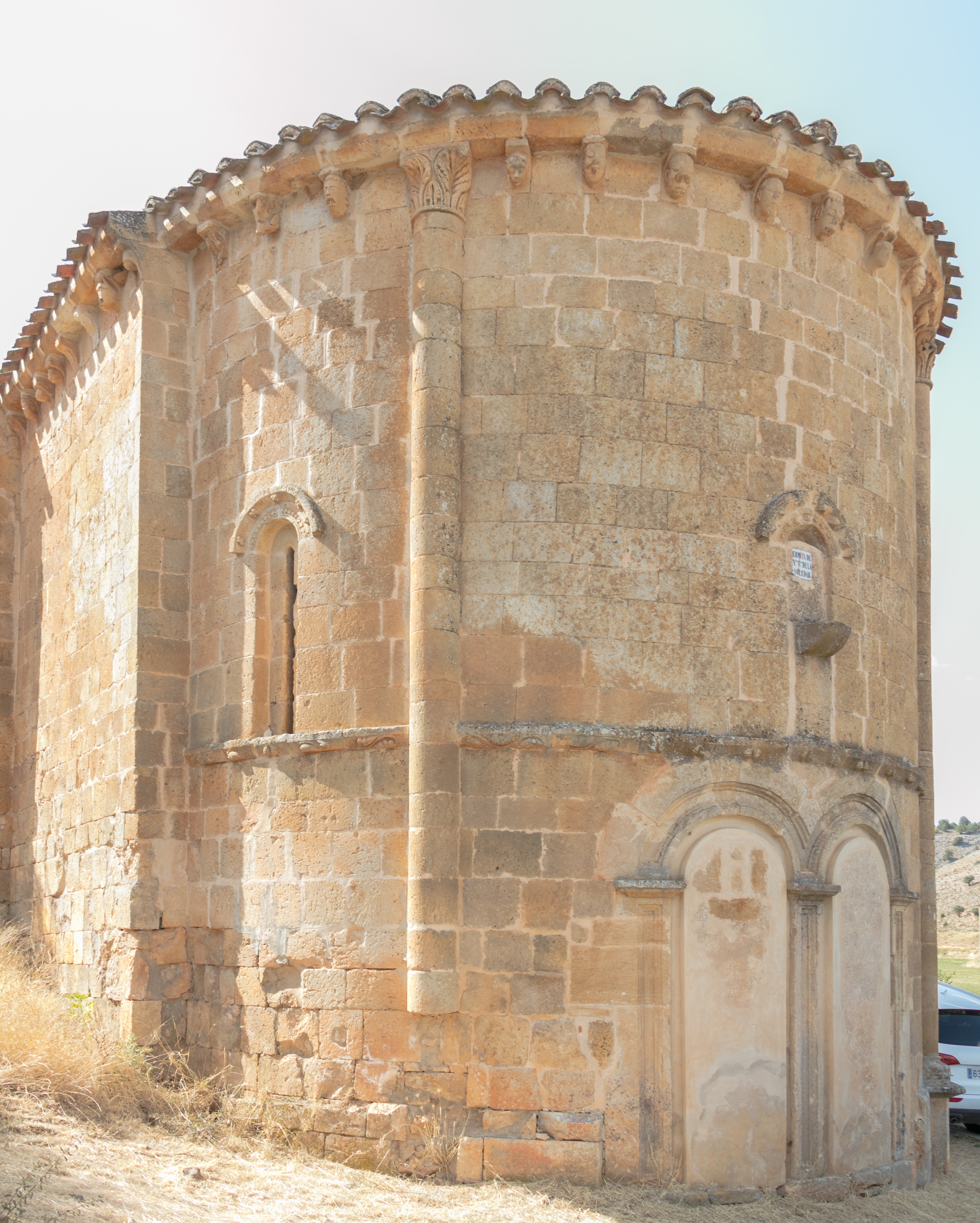
Hermitage of la Soledad.

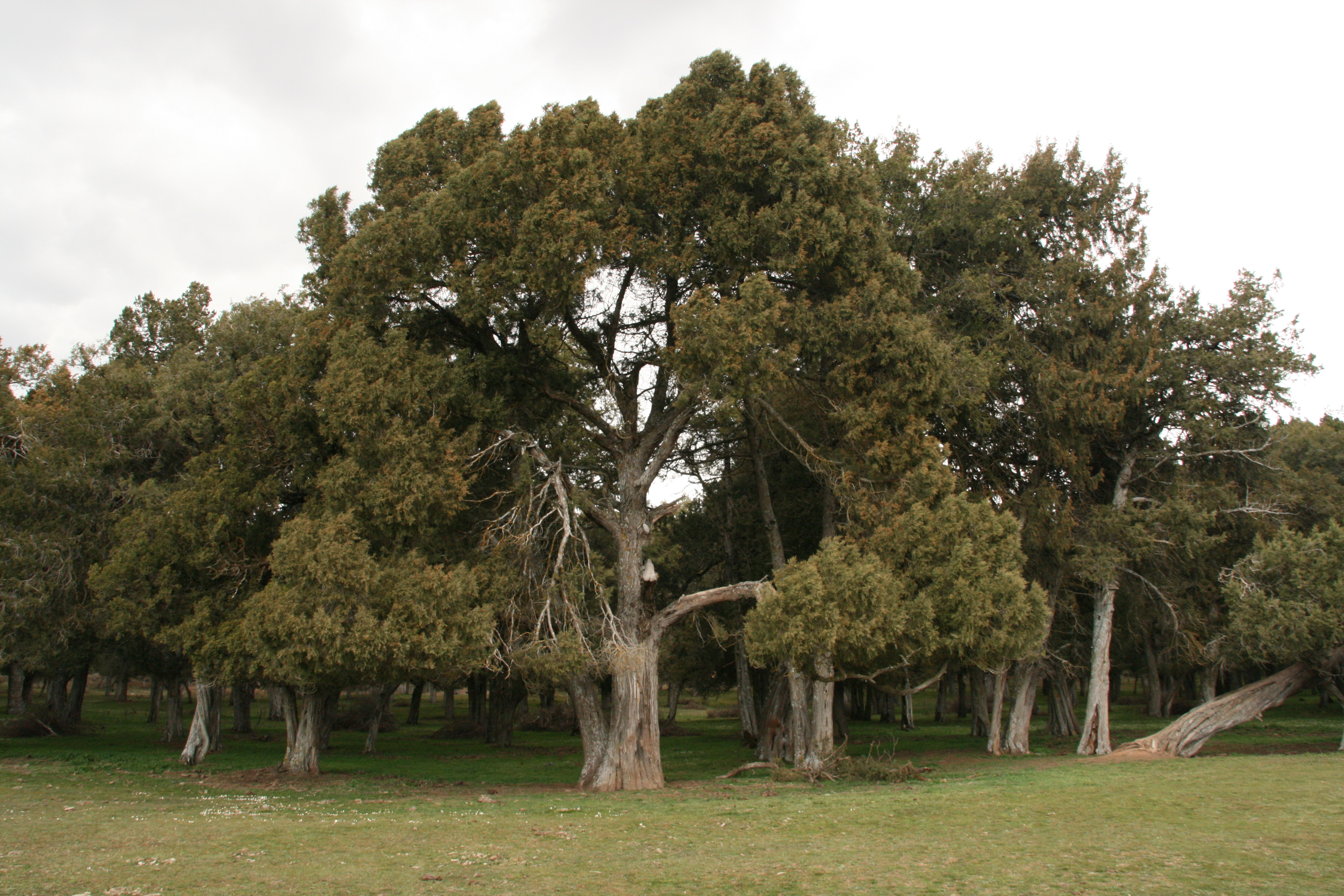
El Sabinar Park.

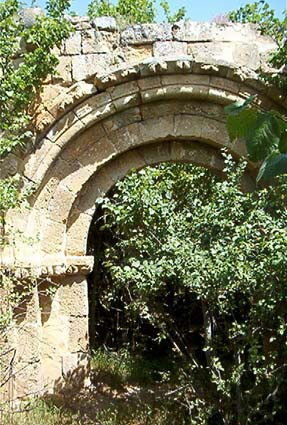
Church of San Juan Bautista.

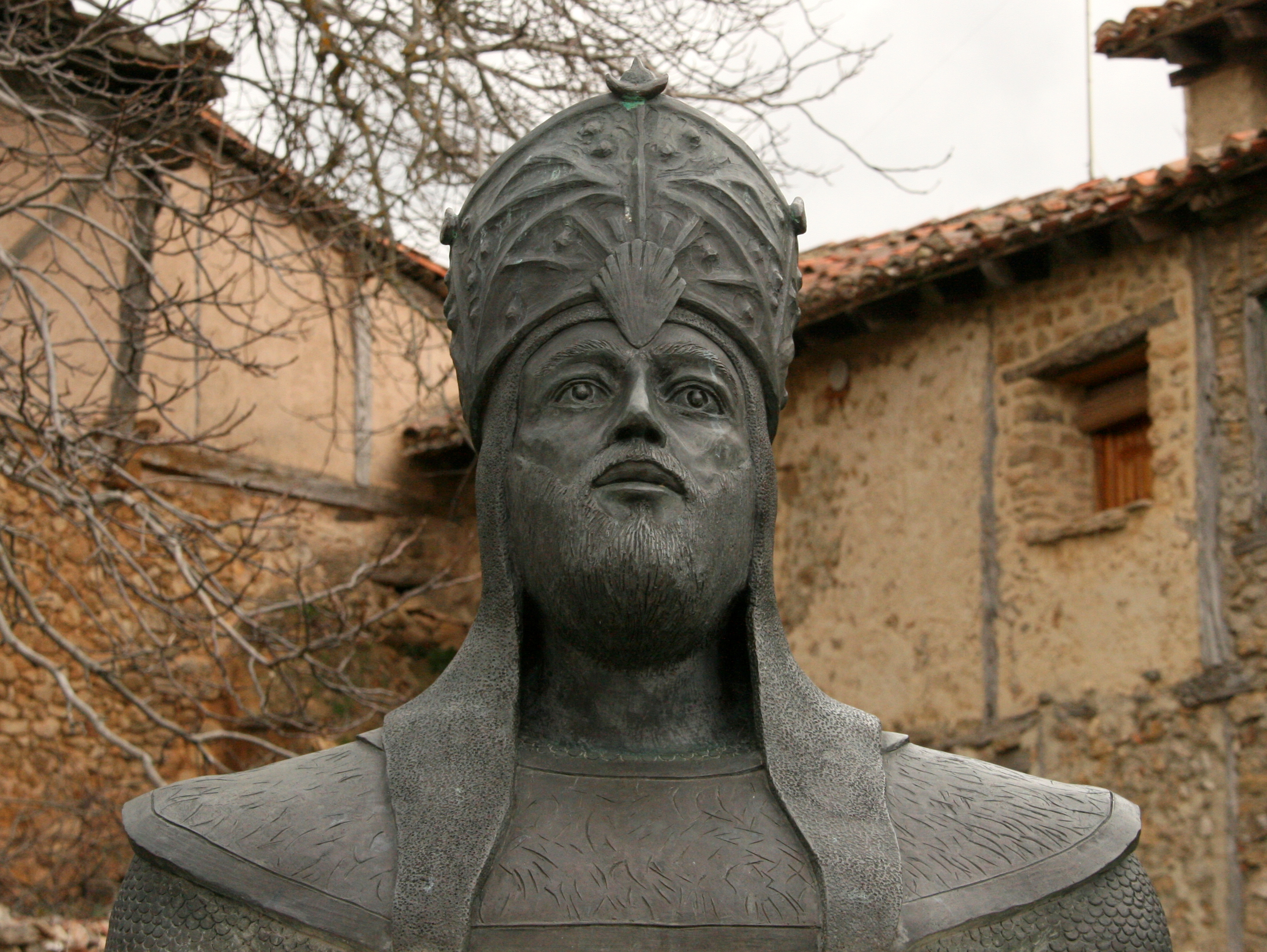
Statue of Almanzor in Calatañazor.

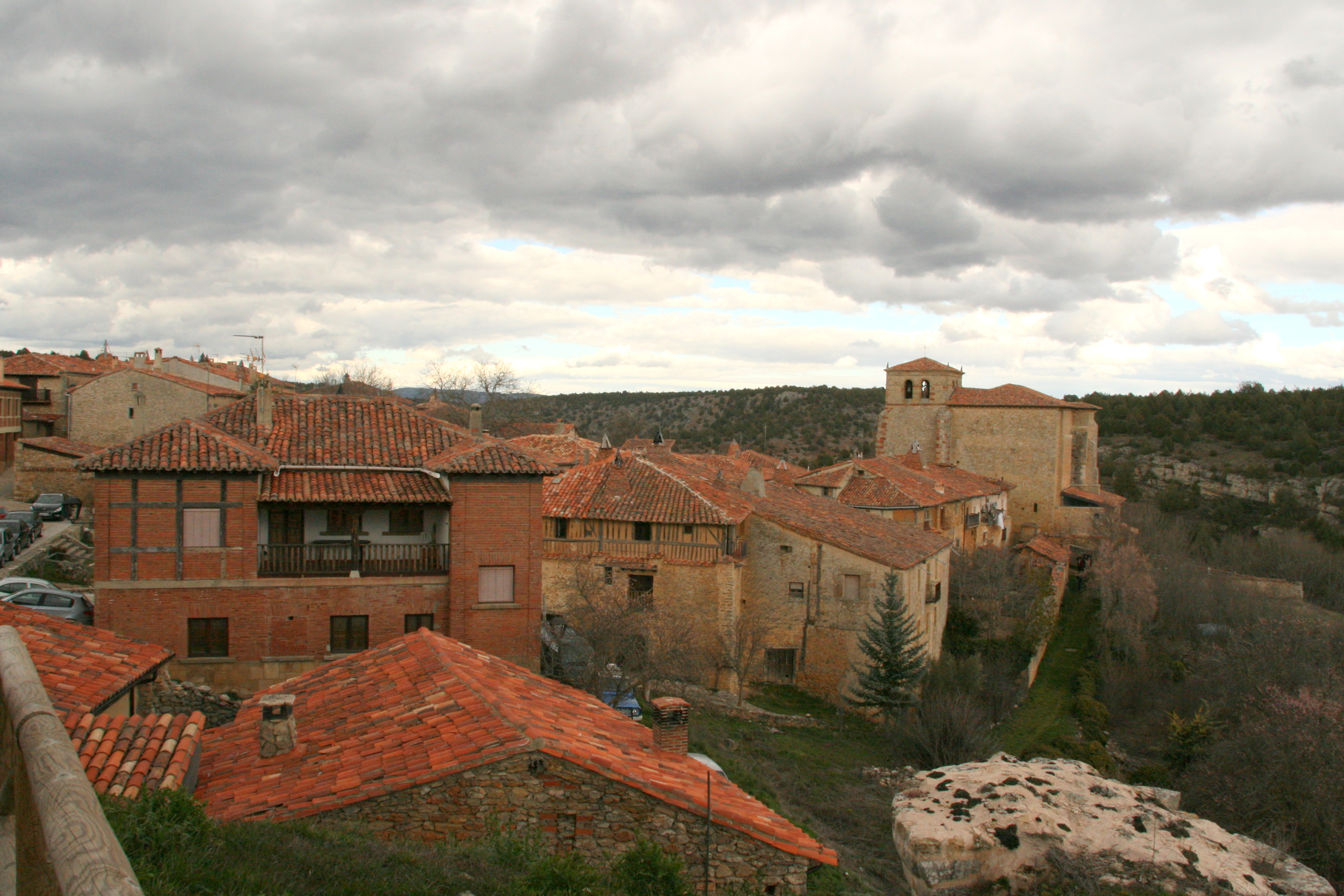
View from the Castle.
