= Battle of Badajoz (1134) =

1134 battle in Spain

- Part of the Reconquista
Date	March 1134
Location	Badajoz
Result	Almoravid victory

Belligerents
Almoravids	Salamanca

Commanders and leaders
Tashfin ibn Ali	Unknown

Strength
Unknown	Unknown

Casualties and losses
Unknown	Few survived

The Battle of Badajoz was a military engagement between a raiding party from Salamanca and the Almoravids. The Salamancans were soundly defeated.

== Background ==
In June 1132, the governor of Toledo, Count Rodrigo González de Lara, led a large Christian army down the Guadalquivir River valley deep into Almoravid territory. In the fertile Aljarafe region west of Seville, the raiders proceeded to loot the territory and destroy the landscape. The Almoravid governor of Seville, Umar, confronted the raiders with a Muslim army, but was defeated. Umar was captured and killed during the battle. Count Rodrigo returned to Toledo with a great amount of plunder and many captives. Count Rodrigo’s expedition quickly became revered and celebrated.

In March 1134, inspired by Count Rodrogo’s expedition, the urban militia of Salamanca decided to conduct their own raid into Almoravid territory. Salamanca was a fortified city and the center of a large territorial jurisdiction within the Kingdom of León, governed by King Alfonso VII. The city was located on the frontier between Alfonso’s kingdom and Almoravid territory. Salamanca had been chartered by the Leonese in 1085 and governed itself with substantial autonomy as long as it remained loyal to Alfonso and continued to serve as a defensive buffer against the Muslims.

== The battle ==
The nobles of Salamanca, motivated by the victory of Rodrigo over the Almoravids at the Battle of Aljarafe decided to raid the Almoravid territory near the city of Badajoz. When the Salamancas arrived at Badajoz, they looted the settlements taking both valuables and livestock; they murdered citizens and took others captive; they destroyed structures, orchards and agricultural fields.

When Tasfin bin Ali, the governor of Cordoba, learned of the raid, he assembled an army and struck out to confront the raiders. Tashfin’s force caught up with the raiders late in the day, east of Badajoz, close to the Sagrajas Hills at a site where his grandfather had previously defeated the Castilians. In preparation for a battle the next morning, Tashfin organized his troops with Zenata Berbers in the front, Andalusian forces on the flanks, and Almoravid troops in the center. Confronted with the upcoming battle with the Almoravids army the next morning, many of the Salamancan nobility in the raiding party fled during the night.

The next morning a battle ensued and the Salamancans were soundly defeated with only a small number of the raiders surviving the massacre. The Almoravids captured the Salamancan camp intact which allowed them to recover the looted materials and livestock. It was also reported that Tashfin liberated the captives that had been taken by the Salamancans although other reports claim that the captives were executed before the battle took place.

== Aftermath ==
Tashfin returned to Cordoba victorious, then to Granada, where he was well received. The Salamancans attempted to raid Badajoz in October 1134 and June 1136, but both of these incursions were also failures.
