= Gonzalo Salvadórez =

Castilian nobleman

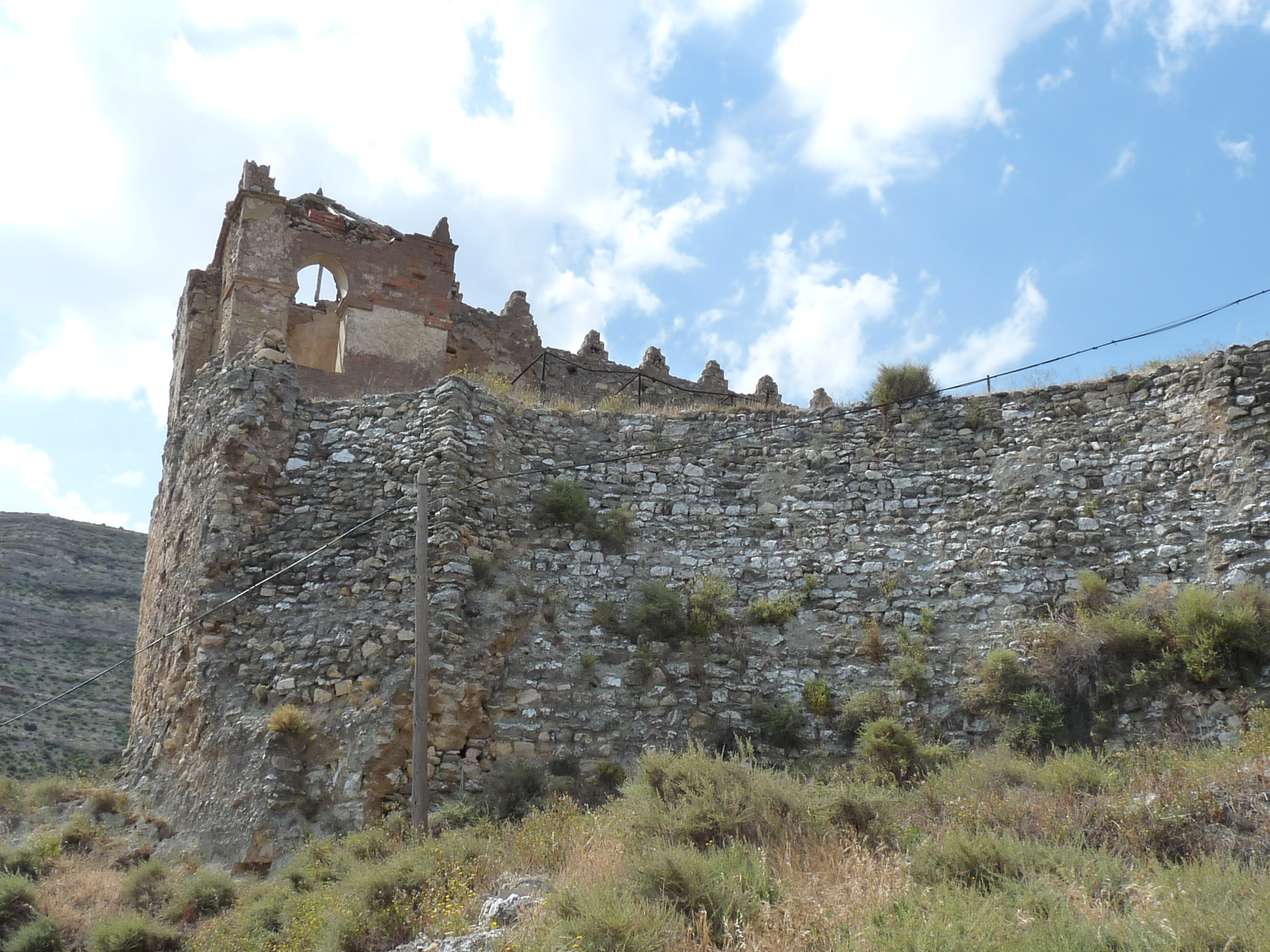
Castle at Rueda de Jalón where Gonzalo and many other nobles lost their lives.

Gonzalo Salvadórez (or Salvadores) (died 6 January 1083), "called Cuatro Manos (‘four hands’) on account of his great valour", was one of the most powerful Castilian noblemen of his era, a kinsman of the Lara family, and by tradition, descendant of the Counts of Castile. He was a son of Salvador González and brother of Álvaro Salvadórez, with whom he often figures in contemporary documentation. His family's area of influence was Bureba.

Gonzalo is first recorded as an adult when he witnessed a charter with his father and uncle, Munio (Muño) González, in 1056, at the court of Ferdinand I. In the next reign, he was a frequent subscriber to the charters of—and attendee at the court of—Sancho II. He was ruling Lara in 1072, when Sancho granted the citizens of Lara the right to pilgrimage to San Millán de Cogolla. He witnessed donations to San Millán in 1070 and 1082 (twice). He and his uncle Munio were one of the first Castilian magnates to support Alfonso VI after the death of Sancho (1072), and Gonzalo attained the rank of count (comes) in 1074. Gonzalo, Munio, and Rodrigo Díaz de Vivar (El Cid) were the only Castilian magnates to figure prominently in royal actions outside of Castile. In total, Gonzalo confirmed some nine charters of Sancho II and eleven by Alfonso. Gonzalo negotiated with King Sancho IV of Navarre the safe passage of the pilgrims of Lara to the shrine of San Millán in 1073, while Sancho and Alfonso were at war.

In December 1082 Albofalac, the governor of Rueda de Jalón, made a pronunciamiento in a favour of Yusuf al-Muzaffar, the imprisoned brother of al-Muqtadir, recently deceased ruler of Zaragoza, and rebelled against al-Mu'tamin, al-Muqtadir's son and successor. At the same time Ibn al-Royolo, who had brought Denia to al-Muqtadir in 1076, was now suspected of intriguing with Alfonso VI against al-Mu'tamin. Further, a recently failed embassy led by Sisnando Davidiz to the court of Zaragoza may have warmed Alfonso to the invitation of Albofalac to take part in his revolt, which he eventually requested. Alfonso sent an army under Gonzalo and Ramiro Garcés, the younger brother of Sancho IV of Navarre. Gonzalo and Ramiro held talks with Yusuf, now free (Albofalac had been his jailer), who may have urged them to request the king's presence. Alfonso did appear, but only for a short while.

After his departure, Yusuf suddenly died. Albofalac then invited Alfonso to take possession of his castle of Rueda, and the king sent Gonzalo and Ramiro under a safe conduct. Immediately before setting out on his final expedition, Gonzalo made a donation to the monastery long patronised by his family, San Salvador de Oña. The act of donation—which reads almost like a will—is a "vivid statement of the aristocratic piety of the eleventh century":

I Count Gonzalo, in readiness for battle against the Moors with my lord, grant and concede to God and to the monastery of Oña where my forebears rest, in order that I may be remembered there for evermore . . . [a list of properties and churches] . . . If I should meet with death among the Moors, may my soul be with Christ; and let my body be borne to Oña and buried there with my kinsfolk, together with [the gifts of] 1600 gold pieces [metcales], and three of my noble horses and two mules, and from my wardrobe two silken robes and three of shot-silk taffeta, and two vessels of silver . . . And if my vassals and retainers do not so bear me [to Oña] in the event of my death, they are nothing worth, like the traitor who kills his lord, because I made them rich and powerful.

When they and their men entered the castle, they were massacred by the garrison, who pelted them with stones. The Annales Compostellani place the death of Gundisalvus comes … apud Rodam (Count Gonzalo … by Rueda) in 1084. The disaster is also placed in 1084 by the Chronicon Iriense, Chronicon Burgense, and Annales Complutenses. The date of the Historia Roderici, however is confirmed by the Chronica Naierensis and has the support of Ramón Menéndez Pidal, Antonio Ubieto Arteta, R. A. Fletcher, and B. F. Reilly.

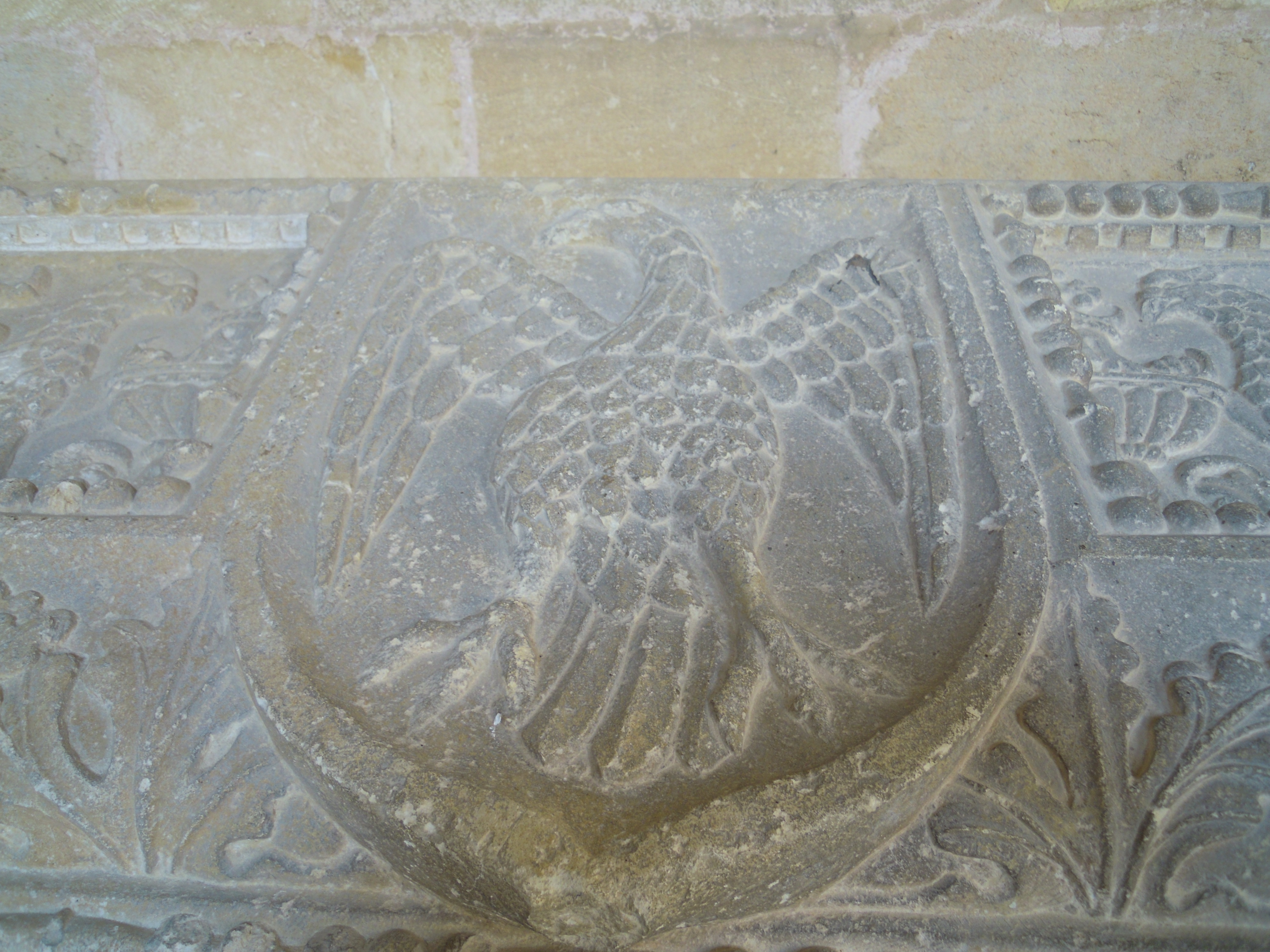
Coat of arms on the lid of the sepulchre of Count Gonzalo and his brother Munio at the monastery of San Salvador de Oña

Gonzalo was buried at Oña as he had requested, and where his ancestors continued to be buried.

Gonzalo's first wife was Elvira Díaz, daughter of Diego Álvarez and sister of Ticlo, wife of Íñigo López, who bore him six children: Goto, Toda, Munia, Dueña, García, and Gustio. His second wife, Sancha Sánchez, daughter of Sancho Macerátiz, bore him two: count Gómez González, Gonzalo's eventual heir and the premier noble and one-time suitor of queen Urraca of León, and Fernando. Goto married Fernando Díaz and was dead by July 1087, when, as the executor of her will, he made a donation to San Salvador de Oña of some land in Hermosilla that she had inherited from her father and uncle Álvaro Salvadórez.
