= Pere de Montsó =

Pere de Montsó (fl. 1173), also Peire de Monzo(n), was an Aragonese troubadour, though none of his compositions survive. He was probably from Monzón near the border with Catalonia, but he may have hailed from Monzón de Campos in Castile, as Ramón Menéndez Pidal believed. He is the subject of the eighth stanza of a famous satire of twelve troubadours by Peire d'Alvernhe. This stanza has different readings:

Ab Peire de Monzo so set,
pos lo coms de Tolosa•l det,
chantan, un sonet avinen,
e cel fon cortes que•l raubet . . .
Ab Peire de Monzo son set,
pus que•l coms de Toloza•l det
qu'anc no soanet d'avinen . . .

With Peire de Monzo there are seven,
whom the count of Toulouse gave,
singing, a convenient melody,
and he was courteous who stole it . . .
With Peire de Monzo they are seven,
since the count of Toulouse,
who never scorned anything becoming, said so . . .

The verse is very unclear. The first reading suggests that Raymond V of Toulouse had heard Pere sing. If Pattison's reconstruction of events surrounding Peire d'Alvernhe's satire is correct, however, Pere de Montsó was attached to the Spanish entourage (possibly as a jongleur) of Eleanor, daughter of Henry II of England and fiancée of Alfonso VIII of Castile, who was travelling through Gascony on her way to Spain when she and her entourage were entertained by Peire's satire. Pattison suggest on the basis of this stanza that the troupe had also travelled through the lands of Toulouse and met in the presence of the Count, whose whereabouts at the time are otherwise unrecorded.

On the second reading, it is clear that Raymond V is alleged to have composed a tune that was subsequently used by Pere, but whether it was stolen from Pere by a third party or whether Pere was considered a thief for using another's melody is not clear.
