= Valdeprado =

- Municipality
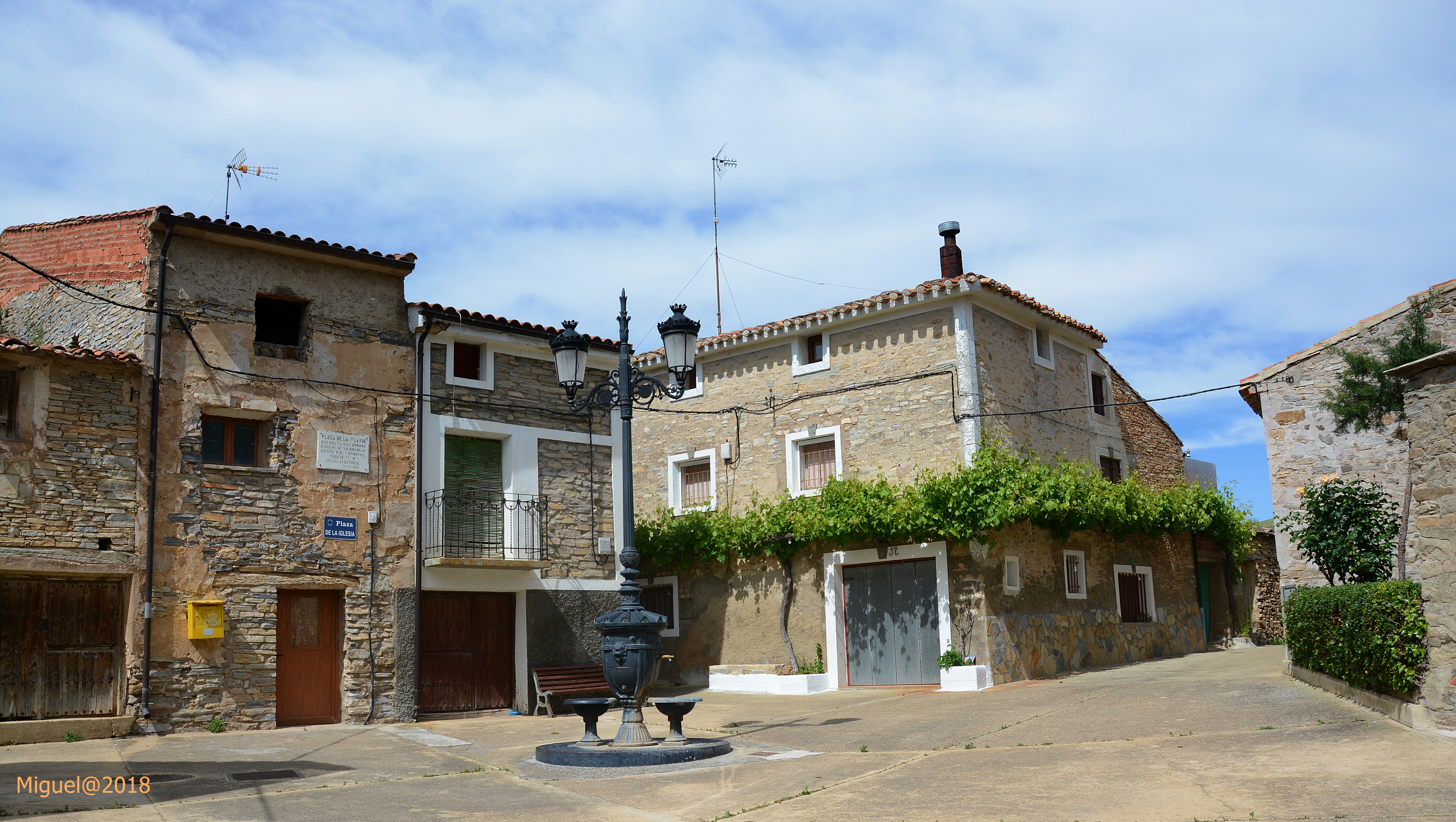
- Main Square of Valdeprado

- Location in Spain. Valdeprado (Spain)
- Coordinates: 41°56′16″N 2°06′29″W
- Country: Spain
- Autonomous community: Castile and León
- Province: Soria
- Municipality: Valdeprado

Area
  - Total: 31.92 km^{2} (12.32 sq mi)

Population (2025-01-01)
  - Total: 8
  - Density: 0.25/km^{2} (0.65/sq mi)
- Time zone: UTC+1 (CET)
  - Summer (DST): UTC+2 (CEST)
- Website: Official website

Valdeprado is a municipality located in the province of Soria, Castile and León, Spain. According to the 2004 census (INE), the municipality had a population of 21 inhabitants.
