= Pernía =

Pernía is a surname.

- Daimí Pernía (born 1976), retired Cuban athlete
- Edwuin Pernía (born 1995), Venezuelan footballer
- Gregorio Pernía (born 1970), Colombian actor of television
- Kimy Pernía Domicó, indigenous leader of the Embera Katío in Colombia
- Leonel Pernía (born 1975), Argentine racing driver
- Mariano Pernía (born 1977), Argentine-Spanish retired footballer
- Vicente Pernía (born 1949), Argentine former professional footballer

== See also ==
- La Pernía
