= Anales castellanos segundos =

The Anales castellanos segundos are a set of Latin annals compiled in the mid or late twelfth century in Castile, covering the period from the nativity of Jesus to the death of Queen Urraca in 1126 (in the edition of Flórez) or to 1110 (in the edition of Gómez-Moreno). It is preserved in a thirteenth-century manuscript now in the Leiden Universiteitsbibliotheek, shelfmark VLO 91. This manuscript was kept at the University of Alcalá de Henares (ancient Complutum) until at least the sixteenth century and thus the annals were known as the Annales Complutenses.

== Editions ==
- In Enrique Flórez, ed. España Sagrada, XXIII (Madrid: 1767), 310–14.
- In Ambrosio Huici y Miranda, ed. and trans. Las crónicas latinas de la Reconquista, I (Valencia: 1913).
- In Manuel Gómez-Moreno Martínez. Anales castellanos segundos (Madrid: 1917), 25–28.
