= Chronicon Burgense =

The Chronicon Burgense is a collection of Latin annals that, together with the Annales Compostellani and the Chronicon Ambrosianum, may form a group of related histories sometimes called the Efemérides riojanas because they may have been compiled in La Rioja. The Chronicon Burgense is named after the Cathedral of Burgos, where it was discovered on one folio of a surviving thirteenth-century obituary/calendar. It deals primarily with matters in the Kingdom of Castile and may have been written at Burgos, the Castilian capital. It also touches on the Kingdom of Navarre (in which La Rioja lay) and covers the period from the Nativity of Jesus to the Battle of Las Navas de Tolosa in 1212. It uses the dating system of the Spanish era and not the Anno domini. It is a unique source for several details relating to early Castilian history. The following is an excerpt:

Era MCXV. Fuit hiems gravissima a festivitate S. Martini usque ad Quadragesimam, & in ipso anno pugnaverunt duo milites pro lege Romana, & Toletana in die Ramis palmarum, & unus eorum erat Castellanus, & alius Toletanus, & victus est Toletanus a Castellano.

1077 AD. It was a severe winter from Martinmas until Quadragesima. And in that year fought two knights [one] for the Roman Rite and [one for] the Mozarabic Rite on Palm Sunday. And one of these [the former] was a Castilian and the other a Toledan. And the Toledan was victorious over the Castilian.

== Editions ==
- In Francisco de Berganza, ed. Antigüedades de España, II (Madrid: 1721), 560–62.
- In Enrique Flórez, ed. España Sagrada, XXIII (Madrid: 1767), 307–10.
- In Manuel Martínez Añíbarro y Rives, ed. Intento de un diccionario biográfico y bibliográfico de autores de la provincia de Burgos (Madrid: 1889), 49–50.
- In A. Huici Miranda, ed. Las crónicas latinas de la Reconquista, I (Valencia: 1913), 27–39.
