= Annales Compostellani =

The Annales Compostellani (Anales compostelanos) or Anales castellanos terceros are a set of Latin annals found in, and named after, Santiago de Compostela. They were found in the manuscript known as the Tumbo negro (or colorado) de Santiago de Compostela (also Codex Compostellanus or Códice compostelano), but they were originally redacted in the Rioja. They are grouped with the Chronicon Ambrosianum and the Chronicon Burgense as the Efemérides riojanas. They cover the history of the County and Kingdom of Castile and the Kingdom of Navarre until the reconquest of Seville in 1248.

== Editions ==
- In Enrique Flórez, ed. España Sagrada, XXIII (Madrid: 1767), 317–24.
- In José María Fernández Catón, ed. El llamado "Tumbo Colorado" (León: 1990), 251–58.
