= Enrique Flórez =

18th-century Spanish ecclesiastical historian

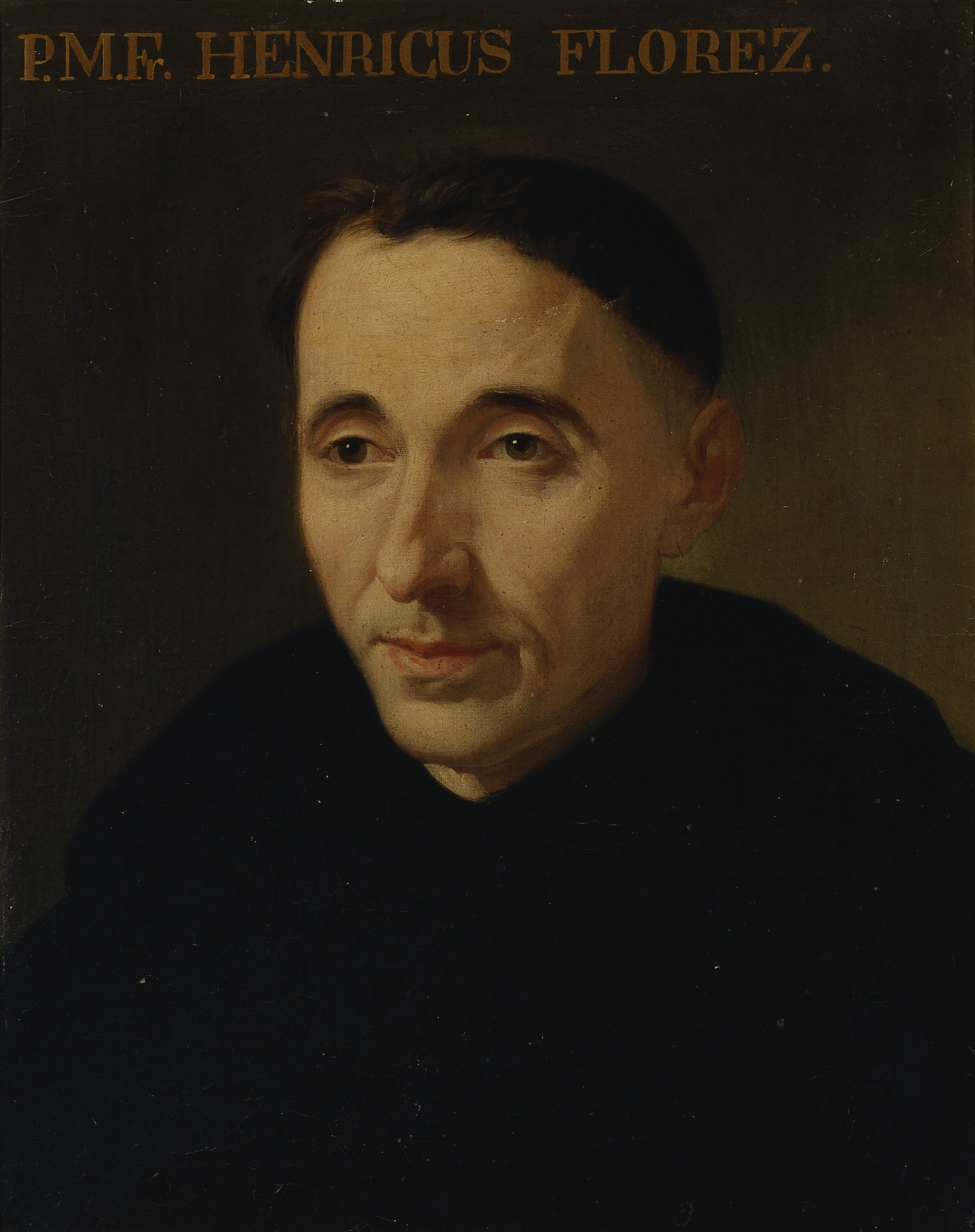
Enrique Florez

Enrique or Henrique Flórez de Setién y Huidobro (July 21, 1702 – August 20, 1773) was a Spanish historian.

== Biography ==
Flórez was born in Villadiego (Burgos). At 15 years old, he entered the order of St Augustine. He subsequently became professor of theology at the University of Alcala, where he published a Cursus theologiae in five volumes (1732–1738). He then devoted himself to historical studies. The first published was his Clavis Historiae, a work similar to the French Art de verifier les dates, and preceding it by several years. It appeared in 1743, and was reprinted many times.

The first volume of España Sagrada, teatro geografico-historico de La Iglesia de España was published in 1747. It consists of a vast compilation of Spanish ecclesiastical history. The book was read throughout Europe. Twenty-nine volumes appeared in the author's lifetime, and it was continued after his death by Manuel Risco and others. Further additions have been made at the expense of the Spanish government. The whole work in fifty-one volumes was published at Madrid (1747–1886). Its value is considerably increased by the insertion of ancient chronicles and documents not easily accessible elsewhere.

Flórez was a good numismatist, and published Medallas de Las Colonias in 2 vols. (1757–1758), of which a third volume appeared in 1773. His last work was the Memorias de las reynas Catolicas, 2 vols. (1770). Flórez led a retired, studious and unambitious life, and died at Madrid.
