= Castle of Torrelobatón =

Castle in Spain

Coordinates: 41.6506°N 5.0256°W

- Castillo de Torrelobatón
- Torrelobatón, Province of Valladolid, Castile and León, in Spain
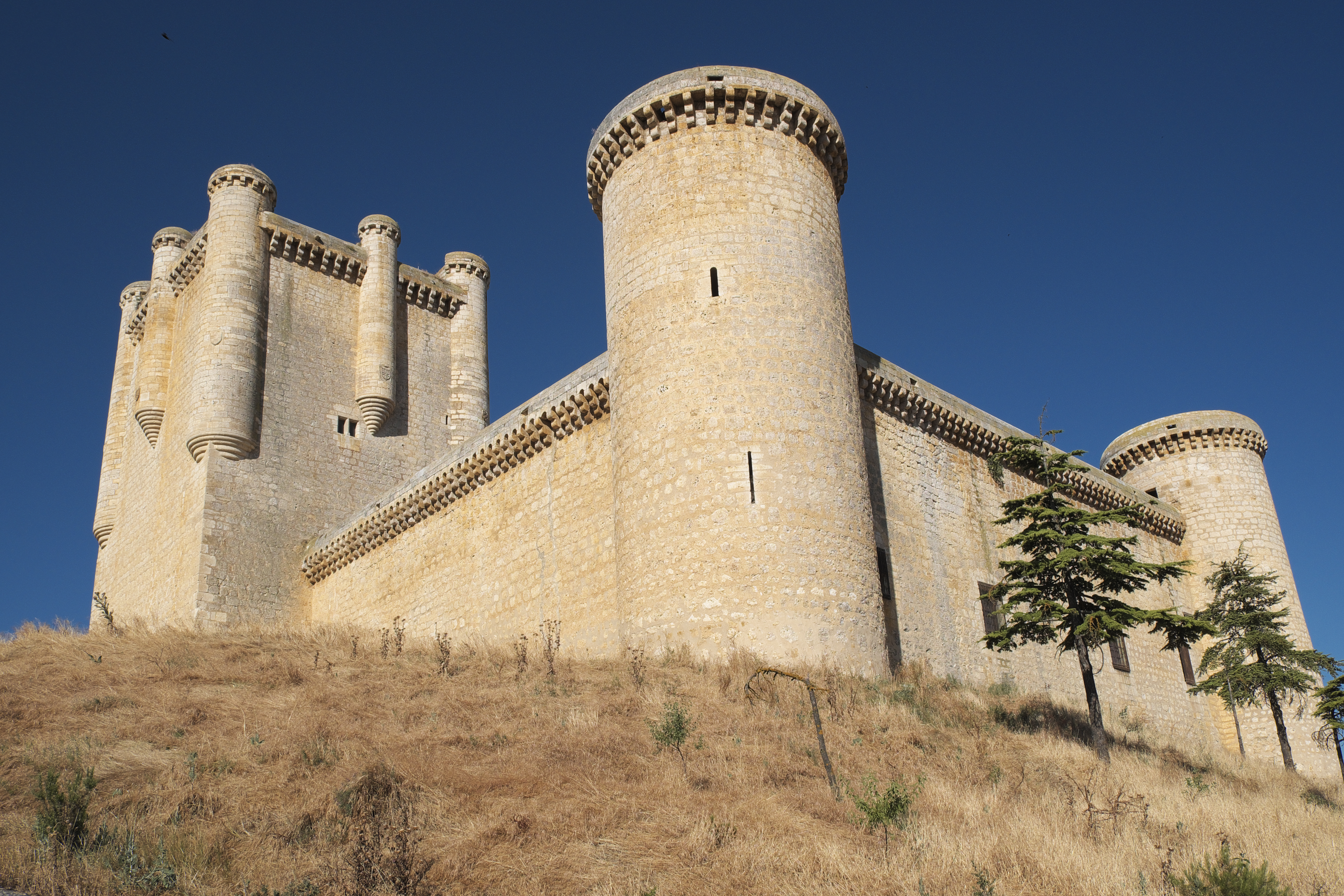
- Castle of Torrelobatón

Site information
- Type: Castle
- Owner: Municipality of Torrelobatón
- Open to the public: Yes

Site history
- Built: 13th century
- Materials: Rocks

Torrelobatón Castle is situated in the province of Valladolid in Castile, Spain. Built as an expression of the strength of the influential Enríquez family, whose capital was at Medina de Rioseco, the castle is one of the most important and best-preserved fortresses in Valladolid. In the historical epic film El Cid with Charlton Heston the castle played the role of Vivar, hometown of Rodrigo Díaz de Vivar - El Cid.

== History ==
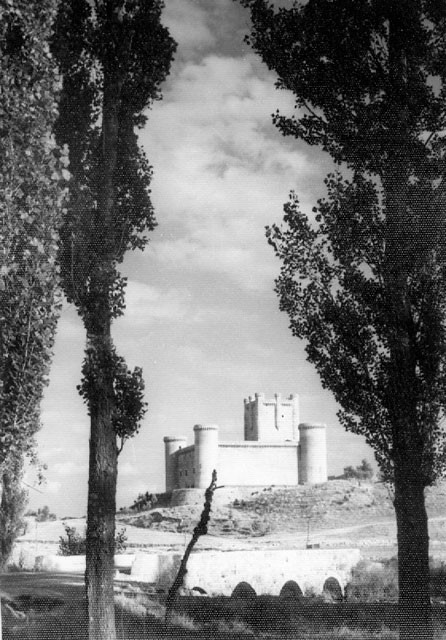
Old photo of the castle.

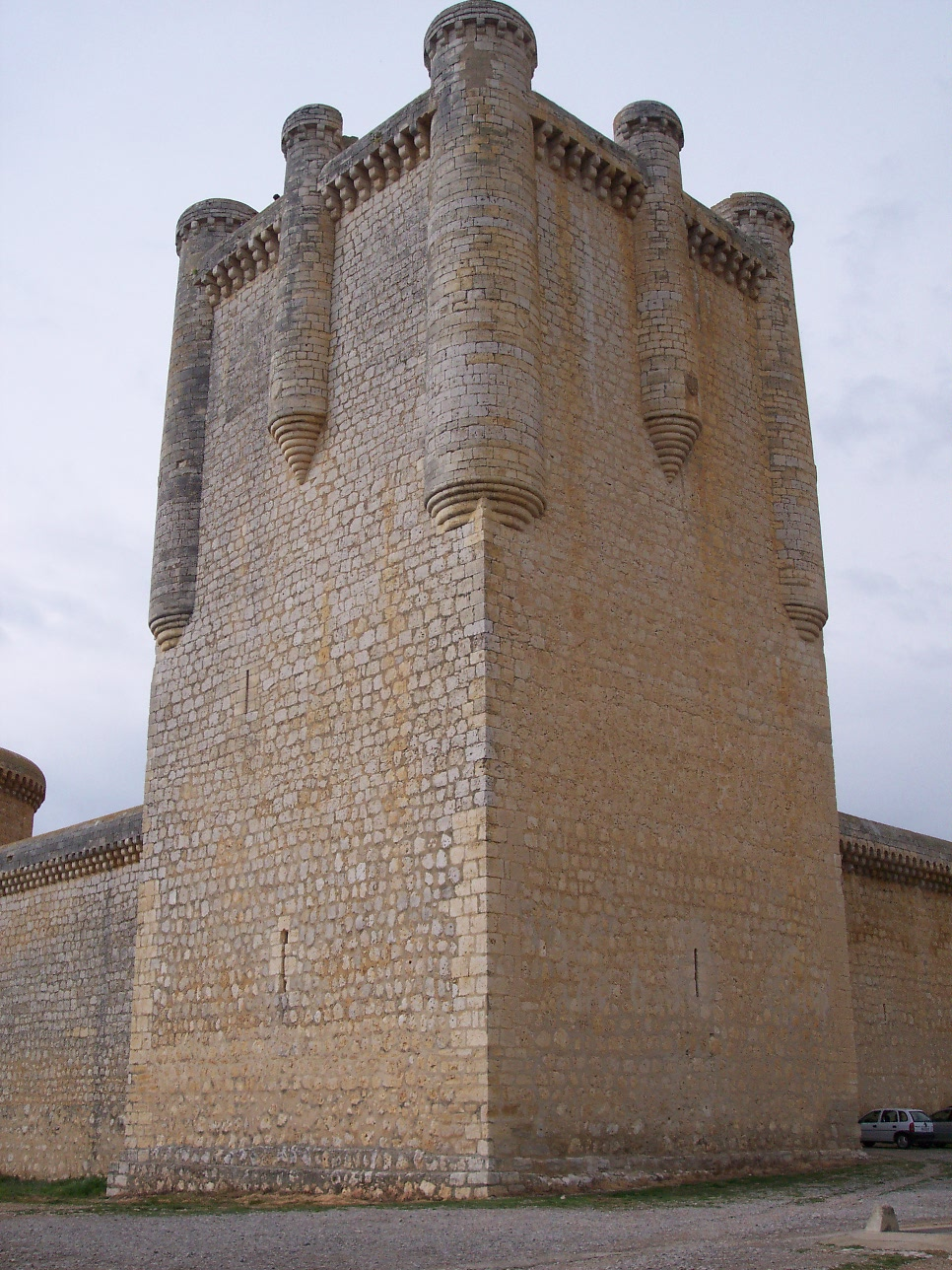
Keep of the castle.

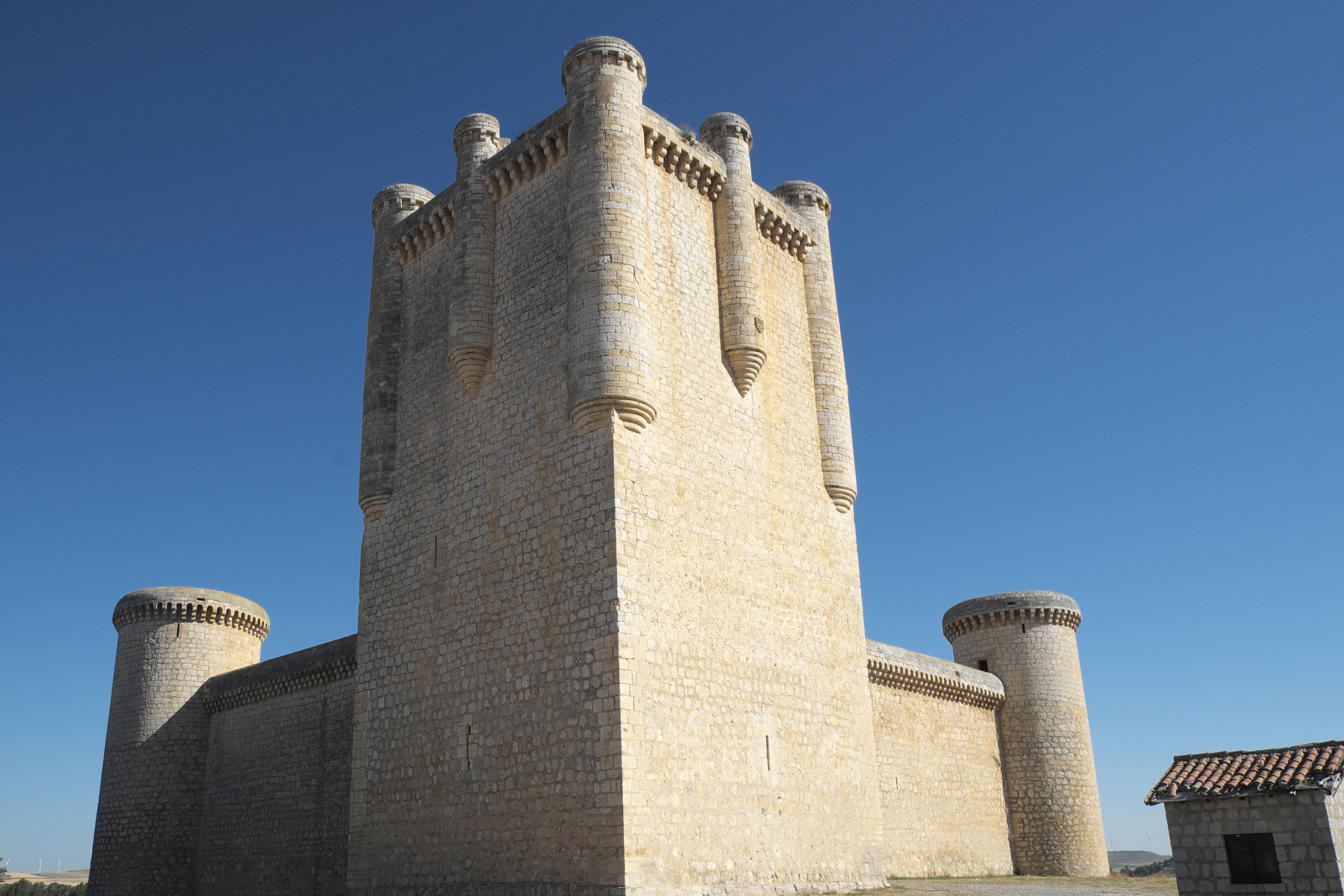
Another view of the Keep of Castle of Torrelobatón

The castle was begun in 1406, when Don Alfonso Enríquez, 1st Admiral of Castile, obtained licence from John II to erect a fortress in Torrelobatón; the only fortification there was a modest stone enclosure surrounding the village. The castle was involved in the Revolt of the Comuneros against Charles I (Holy Roman Emperor Charles V).

== Construction ==
The Torrelobaton Castle is situated on the outskirts of the village on almost the same level, as is the case with many 15th-century seigneurial Castilian fortresses. It has a square ground-plan, with circular turrets at three of the corners and the keep set into the fourth, protecting the gate. The castle was surrounded by an enceinte, of which there are some remains, and a ditch, now mostly filled in. It otherwise lies in the tradition of seigneurial fortresses that, except in some older castles or in those built on raised ground, have a quadrilateral ground-plan with the keep set into one of the corners. The most unusual features of Torrelobatón are the turrets on the keep and the straight parapet.

The entrance to the Torrelobaton Castle courtyard is through a gate with a round-headed arch protected by a portcullis.

The castle is constructed in limestone ashlar. It belongs to a large group of Castilian fortresses of which the most outstanding feature is the keep, often reaching monumental proportions. In addition to the defensive function, the keep served to intimidate the population and discourage rebellion, especially if sited, as at Torrelobatón, on the side of the castle nearest the village. The keep is the most interesting feature of the fortress. Of considerable height, the upper part is protected by eight turrets supported on accordion brackets, one at each corner and one in the middle of each wall.

== El Cid ==
In the historical epic film El Cid the castle played the role of Vivar, hometown of Rodrigo Díaz de Vivar - El Cid.

== See also ==
- Province of Valladolid
- List of castles in Spain
