= 100 Horsemen =

1964 film

- Directed by: Vittorio Cottafavi
- Cinematography: Francisco Marín
- Edited by: Maurizio Lucidi
- Music by: Antonio Pérez Olea
- Release date: 1964
- Countries: Italy; Spain; West Germany
- Language: Italian

100 Horsemen (Italian: I cento cavalieri, Spanish: Los cien caballeros, German: Die hundert Ritter, also known as Son of El Cid) is a 1964 Italian-Spanish-West German historical-adventure film directed by Vittorio Cottafavi.

In 2004 it was restored and shown as part of the retrospective "Storia Segreta del Cinema Italiano: Italian Kings of the Bs" at the 61st Venice International Film Festival.

== Premise ==
Don Fernando, El Cid's son, rallies peasants and townsfolk to oust the Moorish occupiers in medieval Spain.

== Cast ==
- Mark Damon as Don Fernando Herrera y Menendez
- Antonella Lualdi as Sancha Ordoñez
- Gastone Moschin as Frate Carmelo
- Wolfgang Preiss as Sheik Abengalbon
- Barbara Frey as Laurencia
- Rafael Alonso as on Jaime Badaloz
- Hans Nielsen as Alfonso Ordoñez
- Manuel Gallardo as Halaf
- Mario Feliciani as Ambassador of the Sheik
- Arnoldo Foà as Don Gonzalo Herrera y Menendez
- Aldo Sambrell as Alfaqui
