= Saturday, Sunday and Friday =

- Directed by: Castellano & Pipolo; Pasquale Festa Campanile; Sergio Martino
- Written by: Castellano & Pipolo
- Produced by: Luciano Martino
- Starring: Edwige Fenech; Barbara Bouchet; Adriano Celentano; Lino Banfi; Michele Placido; Lova Moor
- Cinematography: Alejandro Ulloa
- Edited by: Mario Siciliano; Eugenio Alabiso
- Music by: Detto Mariano
- Release date: 1979
- Running time: 118 min
- Country: Italy
- Language: Italian

Saturday, Sunday and Friday, originally titled Sabato, domenica e venerdì, is a 1979 Italian anthology comedy film directed by Castellano & Pipolo, Pasquale Festa Campanile and Sergio Martino.

== Plot ==
The film is divided into three episodes that have as their theme the love and public relations.

=== I segment ===
Nicholas La Brocca deals with public relations, but he is also an engineer and must accommodate in Italy a beautiful Japanese female engineer, arrived in the Belpaese to bury the ashes of her grandfather, as the old man wanted in the will before die. Nicola and the Japanese girl fall in love, although Nicola already has a girlfriend.

=== II segment ===
The truck driver Mario is convinced from the neighbor Enza to pretend to be married to her. In fact the girl is of Sicilian origin, and for years lives in the city, and knows that the parents want to see her married with children, otherwise they would not approve. So Mario has to bear all weekend the crazy needs of the false Sicilian relatives.

=== III segment ===
Ambroise Constantin is a dancing master who has a luxurious dance school. He is a very rich man and he is revered by his young dancers, except for the rebel girl Jacqueline, who wants to marry the gangster Fred. Ambroise must prevent it.

== Cast ==
=== Sabato (Saturday) ===
- Adriano Celentano: Ambrose Costantin
- Edwige Fenech: Eng. Tokimoto
- Michele Placido: Mario Salvetti
- Lino Banfi: Nicola La Brocca
- Milena Vukotic: Clelia Benelli
- Lory Del Santo: Baby
- Daniele Vargas: Director of La Brocca
- Gino Pagnani: "Zaikoto" worker
- Salvatore Baccaro: Gustavo
- Nello Pazzafini: brother of Gustavo

(directed by Sergio Martino)

=== Domenica (Sunday) ===
- Barbara Bouchet: Enza Paternò
- Michele Placido: Mario Salvetti
- Manuel Zarzo: Camillo Magnaghi

(directed by Pasquale Festa Campanile)

=== Venerdì (Friday) ===
- Adriano Celentano: Ambrose Costantin
- Lova Moor: Jacqueline
- Manuel Gallardo: Fred
- Salvatore Borgese: scagnozzo del gangster

(directed by Castellano & Pipolo)

== Release ==
Saturday, Sunday and Friday was released in Italy on 20 October 1979.
