= María Rodríguez de Vivar =

Countess consort of Barcelona (1080–1105)

María Rodríguez (1080–1105) was countess consort of Barcelona.

Daughter of Rodrigo Díaz de Vivar, more commonly known as El Cid Campeador and Jimena Díaz.

== Marriage and descendants ==
Sources associated with the legend of her father tale of the marriages of the daughters of El Cid to the Infantes de Carrión, their humiliation by the Infantes, and their subsequent remarriage to princes of Navarre and Aragon. The Infantes are entirely legendary, but given that her sister Cristina did marry a scion of the Navarre royal family, the latter marriages may have a historical basis. If so, the husband of María is presumed to be the son of Peter I known to have died before reaching adulthood. María was married to the Count of Barcelona, Ramon Berenguer III, receiving as a dowry Tizona, an ancient sword belonging to the first counts of Urgel that Berenguer Ramon II lost in the Battle of Tébar. From this marriage was born one daughter:

- María of Barcelona, countess consort of Besalú.
