= Serafín Martínez del Rincón y Trives =

Spanish painter

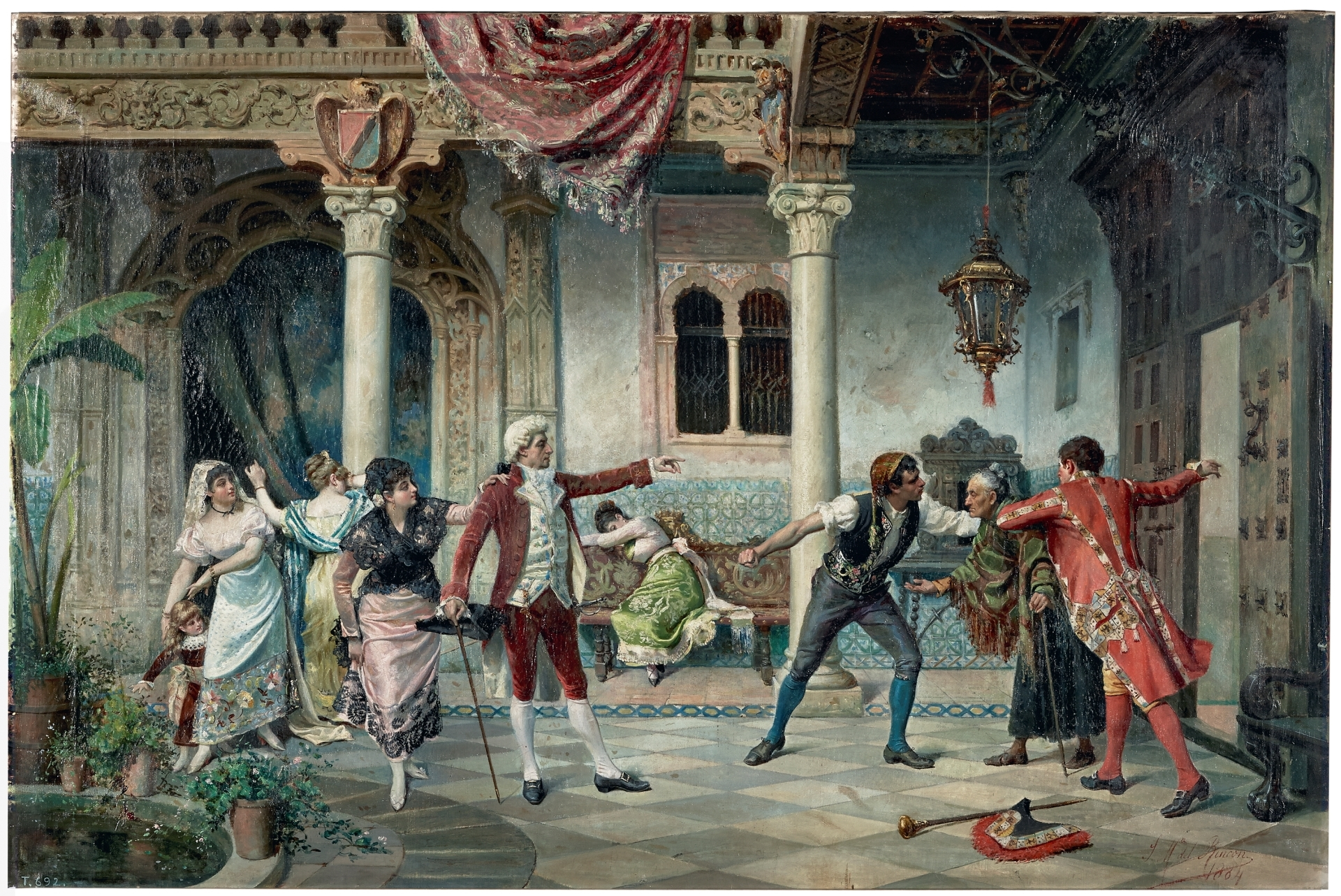
Poor Witch!

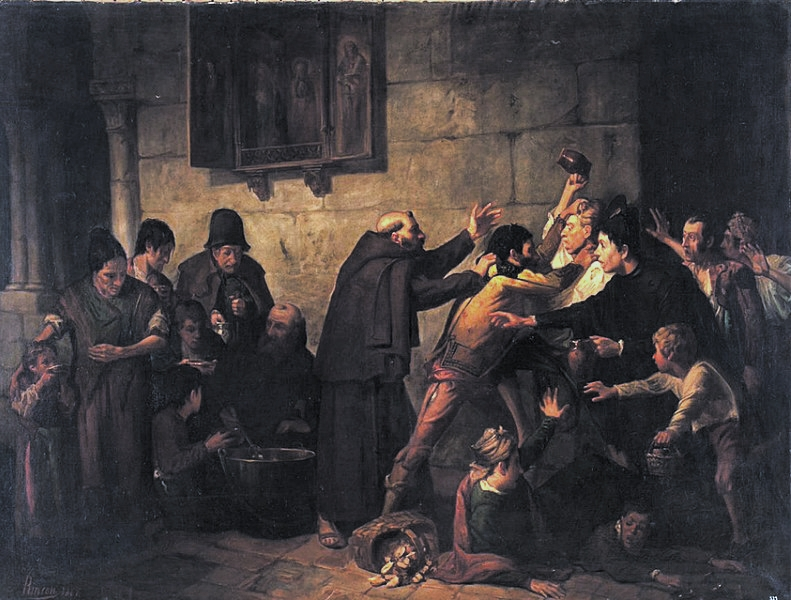
Soup Distribution at a Capuchin Convent

Serafín Martínez del Rincón y Trives (1840, Palencia - 24 March 1892, Madrid) was a Spanish painter, known for his genre and history scenes and portraits.

== Biography ==
He took his first art lessons at the Escuela Municipal de Dibujo de Palencia, then moved to Madrid to finish his studies at the Real Academia de Bellas Artes de San Fernando.

Encouraged by regional showings in Valladolid, which were well-received, in 1862 he participated in the National Exhibition of Fine Arts with a painting depicting "The Cid's oath in Santa Gadea". Two years later, he presented a Biblical scene showing the "Raising of Jairus' daughter", in hopes of winning a scholarship to Rome, but he was not successful. He had no more significant showings until 1878, when he received a third-class medal for his painting "An Excorcism", which was then sent to the Exposition Universelle in Paris. In 1881, the city of Málaga acquired his painting of the two lovers whose suicide inspired the name of a local landmark; the "Peña de los Enamorados" (Lovers' Rock).

In 1866, he was named a professor at the Escuela de Bellas Artes in Cádiz. Later, he became a professor of drawing and decoration at the Real Academia de Bellas Artes de San Telmo in Málaga, but returned to Cádiz in 1883 to take the chair of color and composition. During the final years of his career, he abandoned history painting in favor of genre scenes and the occasional portrait; notably one of King Alfonso XII on horseback for the Academia de Caballería de Valladolid.

By 1888, he had become Director of the Escuela de Artes y Oficios de Madrid. That year, José Canalejas, the Minister of Development, proposed him as a candidate for the Grand Cross of the Order of Isabella the Catholic, which he was awarded in July.

His only daughter died in July 1891, and he died the following March.
