= Lova Moor =

French dancer and singer

- Birth name: Marie-Claude Jourdain
- Born: 5 March 1946 (age 79)
- Origin: France
- Genres: Pop
- Occupation(s): Singer, dancer
- Years active: 1986–2003

Lova Moor (born Marie-Claude Jourdain; 5 March 1946) is a French dancer and singer.

== Biography ==
Lova Moor was born in La Grève-sur-Mignon, Charente-Maritime. She began her career as a nude dancer. Hired by Alain Bernardin at the Crazy Horse Saloon, she quickly reached notoriety by becoming leader of the troupe and by marrying her employer, who died in 1994. Beginning in 1995 she also had a brief relationship with French playboy Constantin Djirjirian.

In 1986, she released her debut single, "Tendresse SOS" which passed unnoticed, then "Et je danse" in 1988 which hit No. 9 on the French SNEP Singles Chart. Her next singles, "Je m'en balance" (1989), "Danse encore" (1990), "My Life" (1991), "Jealous" (1992), "As You Want" (1993), "Ma Géographie" (1993), "Oh les mecs" (1997) and "Batucada" (1998). A compilation containing another song "C'est vrai" was released in 2003 by Yvon Chataigner. She appeared in three films : Crazy Horse de Paris (Alain Bernardin, 1977), Saturday, Sunday and Friday (Castellano & Pipolo, 1979) and Le Tronc (Bernard Faroux and Karl Zéro, 1992).

== Discography ==
Item	Year	Title(s)	Country	Release
7"	1986	"Tendresse... S.O.S"	FRA	Jonathan ATO 27091
7"	1988	"Et je danse"	FRA	Trema 410449
7"	1989	"J'm'en balance"	FRA	Trema 410472
7"	1990	"Danse encore"	FRA	Trema 410491
7"	1991	"My Life"	FRA	Charles Talar 990 467
CDM	1992	"Jealous"	FRA	Pomme Music 995 005
sCD	1993	"Ma Géographie"	FRA	Pomme Music 995 291
sCD	1996	"Oh les Mecs!"	FRA	WH Rec 19226.2
sCD	1997	"La Maman de tous les hommes"	FRA	WH Rec JWS 617
CD	2003	"Crazy Songs"	FRA	Disques Yvon Chateigner 2003
