= Carmen Campi Doctoris =

Anonymous medieval Latin epic poem

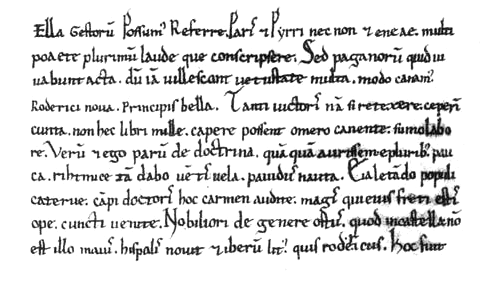
- Also known as: Poema latino del Cid (Latin poem of the Cid)
- Author(s): unknown
- Language: Latin
- Date: composed around 1083
- Manuscript(s): Unique manuscript. Bibliothèque nationale de France, ms. lat. 5132
- Genre: epic poetry
- Verse form: sapphic-adonic verses
- Length: 128 verses in 32 stanzas

The Carmen Campi Doctoris ("Song of the Master of the Field") is an anonymous medieval Latin epic poem, consisting of 32 accentual-syllabic Sapphic stanzas, for a total of 128 lines, with one line from an unfinished thirty-third. It is the earliest poem about the Spanish folk hero El Cid Campeador, and was found in the monastery of Santa Maria de Ripoll in the 17th century, after which it was transferred to the Bibliothèque nationale de France where it currently resides as manuscript lat. 5132.

== Content ==
Subjectwise, the poem is a narrative of three of El Cid's victories: over an unknown Navarrese champion, over count García Ordóñez de Cabra, and finally over the Berenguer Ramon II, Count of Barcelona. The poem begins conventionally, with the poet confessing his unworthiness to sing of such a hero as El Cid, and moves quickly through his subject's youth, his early triumph over the champion from Navarre, and his loyal service to Sancho II of Castile and Alfonso VI of León. The anonymous poet blames the Cid's subsequent exile from court on certain enemies who turn the king against him. But the Cid is victorious over the army of García Ordóñez that Alfonso sent against him. The poet then describes, in great detail, a description of the Cid arming himself for battle against the Count of Barcelona—the battle of Almenar (1082). The poem ends abruptly, obviously incomplete, before the battle.

The description of the Cid's weapons, the earliest in the literature, contains references to chainmail, a silver-plated helm with a golden gem on it, a lance, an anonymous sword with golden ornamentation (which may be Tizona, based on the description), and a shield depicting a "fierce shining golden dragon" (which is the only surviving description of the Cid's shield).

The Carmen also contains the earliest description of the Cid's ancestry, describing him as Nobiliori de genere ortus / Quod in Castello non est illo maius: "He sprung from a more noble family, there is none older than it in Castile." R. A. Fletcher suggests this is a discreet way of saying that the Cid's ancestors were not among the most noble, just nobler than some.

== Date and authorship ==
The author of the Carmen was a good Latinist writing, to judge from his classical allusions, for a learned audience, probably at Ripoll. The hymn-like rhythm and rhyme strongly suggests that it was designed for public recitation. Scholars have dated the poem as early as 1083 (after the battle of Almenar in 1082) and as late as c.1100.

The motive of a Catalan monk in writing about a Castilian hero has been explained by the date of 1083 and the politics of Catalonia at that time. Since 1076 the brothers Berenguer Ramon II and Ramon Berenguer II had been trying to rule Catalonia jointly in accordance with their late father's wishes. This had proved unworkable and two divisions of the realm (1079 and 1080) had granted the Diocese of Vic, in which lay Ripoll, to Ramon Berenguer. The bishop of Vic, Berenguer Sunifred de Lluçà, was among Ramon's supporters. The Carmen was probably written by supporters of Ramon to celebrate his brother's defeat at the hands of the Cid, on the eve of civil war in Catalonia.

The Late Latin title campi doctor or campi doctus (literally "teacher of the [military] field"), rendered campeador in Castilian Romance, is first applied to the Cid by the anonymous author of the Carmen, and it may be his literary invention. The library of Ripoll may have contained references to the obscure fourth- and fifth-century Roman military usage. It is not known how the term, which originally indicated a "regimental drill-instructor", came to currency in eleventh-century Spain, with a meaning like "armiger".

== Extracts ==
1

Gesta bellorum possumus referre
Paris et Pyrri necnon et Eneae,
multi poete plurima in laude
que conscripsere.

We can tell about the deeds of the warriors
Paris and Pyrrhus, and also Aeneas,
in whose honor many poets
have written.

2

Sed paganorum quid iuvabunt acta,
dum iam villescant vetustate multa?
Modo canamus Roderici nova
principis bella.

But, what joy do the pagan stories bring,
if they lose their value due to their antiquity?
Let's now sing about Rodrigo's
new battles.

3

Tanti victoris nam si retexere
ceperim cunta, non hec libri mille
capere possent, Omero canente,
sumo labore.

Because if I sang his victories,
there are so many that not even one thousand books
could gather them, even if Homer himself sings,
with great effort.

6

Hoc fuit primum singulare bellum
cum adolescens devicit Navarrum;
hinc campi doctor dictus est maiorum
ore virorum.

This was his first single combat,
when as a young man he defeated the Navarrese champion;
for this reason he was called campi doctor
by his elders.

7

Iam portendebat quid esset facturus,
comitum lites nam superatus,
regias opes pede calcaturus
ense capturus.

Already he was foreshadowing what he was (later) to perform:
for he would defeat the strivings of counts,
trample beneath his feet and capture with his sword
the wealth of kings.

== Bibliography ==
- Barton, Simon. 1997. The Aristocracy in Twelfth-Century León and Castile. Cambridge: Cambridge University Press.
- Fletcher, Richard A. 1989. The Quest for El Cid. New York: Alfred A. Knopf. ISBN 0-394-57447-8.
- Menéndez Pidal, Ramón. 1956. La España del Cid. Madrid: Espasa-Calpe.
- Reilly, Bernard F. 1988. The Kingdom of León-Castilla under King Alfonso VI, 1065–1109. Princeton: Princeton University Press.
