= Ramiro Sánchez =

Spanish nobleman (c. 1070–1129/1130)

Ramiro Sánchez, Lord of Monzón
- Born: c. 1070
- Died: 1129/1130
- Noble family: House of Jiménez
- Spouse: Cristina Rodríguez
- Issue: García Ramírez; Elvira
- Father: Sancho Garcés, Lord of Uncastillo
- Mother: Constance

Ramiro Sánchez of Monzón (c. 1070–1129/1130) was a noble kinsman of the kings of Navarre. In 1104 he was tenente of Urroz, of Monzón between 1104 and 1116, probably of Tudela in 1117 and from 1122 to 1129 in Erro.

== Biography ==
His father was Sancho Garcés, an illegitimate son of king García Sánchez III of Navarre. His mother was Constance, whose parentage has been subject to recent speculation - associated with the lords of Marañón in traditional sources, she has lately been suggested to have been daughter of queen Estefanía, King García's wife, and hence stepsister of her husband.

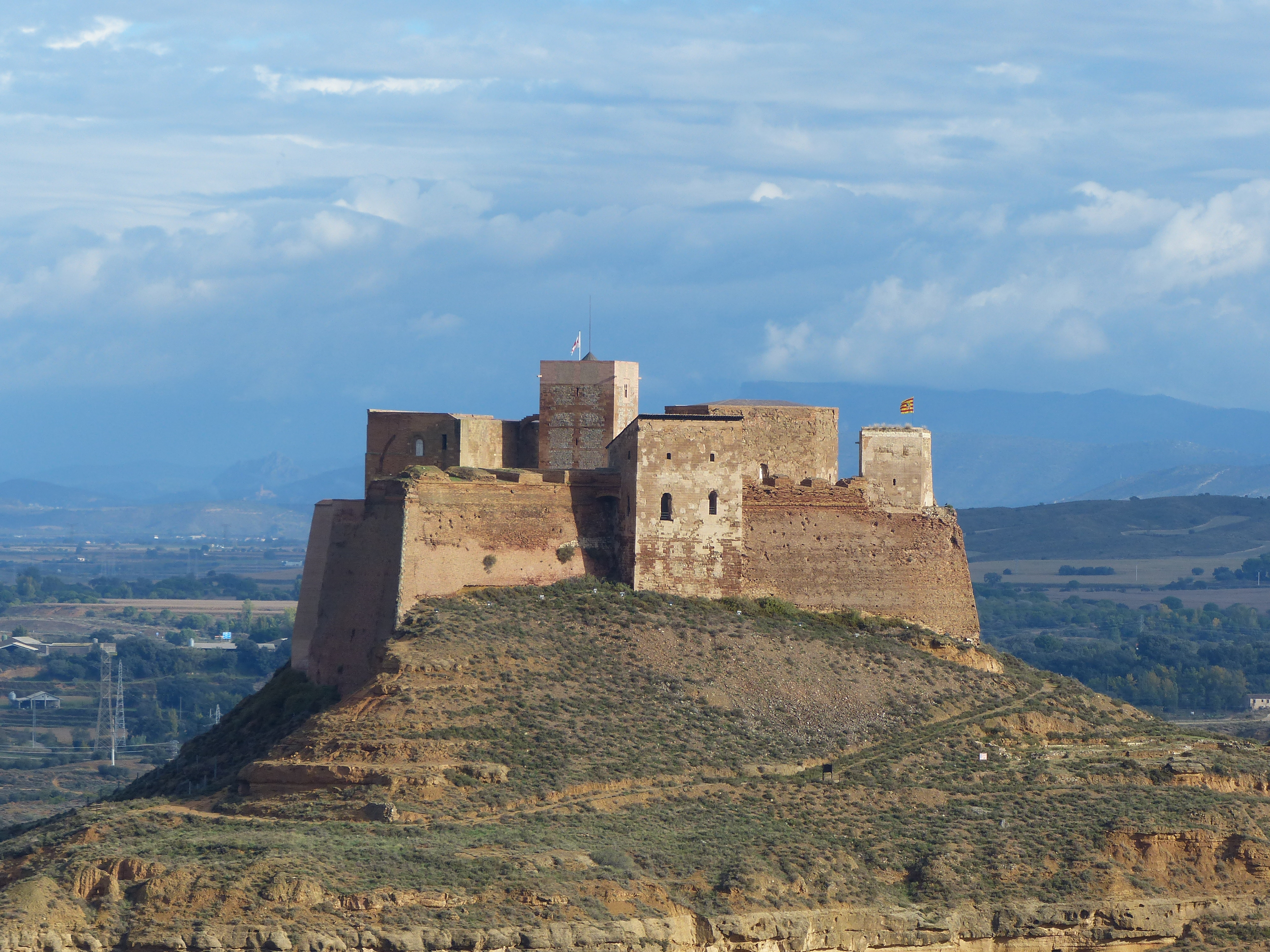
Monzón Castle

With the fall of his uncle, king Sancho IV of Navarre, the kingdom was divided between Castile and Aragon, and the royal family parceled out between the two. Ramiro was thus raised at the Aragonese court, and was lord of Monzón, in which he was succeeded by his eldest son, the future king García Ramírez of Navarre.

Although ancient authors claimed that Ramiro was a participant in the First Crusade, such participation is highly unlikely. He had supposedly left together with other nobles on March 15, 1095, but that is impossible as the crusade had not yet been called at the council of Clermont and this did not occur until a few months later. On the other hand, according to Antonio Ubieto Arteta, it was to be supposed that had he gone to the Holy Land, "he would have remained in the Christian army until the conquest of Jerusalem; however, we find him in Valencia around 1098, marrying a daughter of El Cid and in July 1099 accompanying the body of El Cid to Cardeña". He initiated the construction of Santa María de La Piscina, which was consecrated in 1137.

Around 1098, Ramiro was married to Cristina Rodríguez daughter of El Cid. Their children were:

- García Ramírez (the Restorer), King of Navarre
- Elvira, wife of count Rodrigo Gómez and mother of Gonzalo Ruiz of Bureba

== Sources ==
Primary

- The Chronicle of Alfonso the Emperor
- Ubieto Arteta, Antonio (1947). La participación navarro-aragonesa en la primera cruzada (in Spanish). Príncipe de Viana. ISSN 1137-7054.

Secondary

- Arco y Garay, Ricardo del (1949). "Dos infantes de Navarra, señores de Monzón" (PDF). Príncipe de Viana (in Spanish). No. Year 10, No. 35-36. pp. 275–284. ISSN 0032-8472.
- Martínez Díez, Gonzalo (2007). El Cid histórico (in Spanish). Barcelona: Editorial Planeta, S.A. ISBN 978-84-08-07165-5.
- Montaner Frutos, Alberto (2011). "La Historia Roderici y el archivo cidiano: cuestiones filológicas, diplomáticas, jurídicas, e historiográficas". e-Legal History Review (in Spanish). No. 12. ISSN 1699-5317.
- Pamplona, Germán de (1949). "Filiación y derechos al Trono de Navarra de García Ramírez el Restaurador" (PDF). Príncipe de Viana (in Spanish). No. Year 10, No. 35-36. pp. 275–284. ISSN 0032-8472.
- Salazar y Acha, Jaime de (1992). "Reflexiones sobre la posible historicidad de un episodio de la Crónica Najerense" (PDF). Príncipe de Viana (in Spanish). No. Annex 14. pp. 537–564. ISSN 1137-7054.
