= Cristina Rodríguez (noble) =

Daughter of Rodrigo Diaz the Cid

Cristina Rodríguez (born c. 1075) was a daughter of Rodrigo Díaz also known as El Cid and Jimena Díaz.

In 1099 or earlier, she married Ramiro Sánchez of Pamplona, the tenant-in-chief of Monzón from 1104. She was the mother of King García Ramírez of Navarre el Restaurador, who in 1130 was married to Margaret of L'Aigle. She was also the mother of Elvira Ramírez, who married before 1137 to Rodrigo Gómez., son of Count Gómez González el de Candespina.

== Sources ==
- Martínez Díez, Gonzalo (2007). "Los Infantes de Carrión del Cantar Cidiano y su nula historicidad" (PDF). Historia, instituciones, documentos (in Spanish). No. 34. pp. 207–223. ISSN 1137-7054.
- Ian Michael, «Introducción» to his edition of Poema de Mío Cid, Madrid, Castalia, 1976, páge 39. ISBN 978-84-7039-171-2.
