= Vivar del Cid =

Village in Spain

Coordinates: 42°25′22″N 3°40′46″W

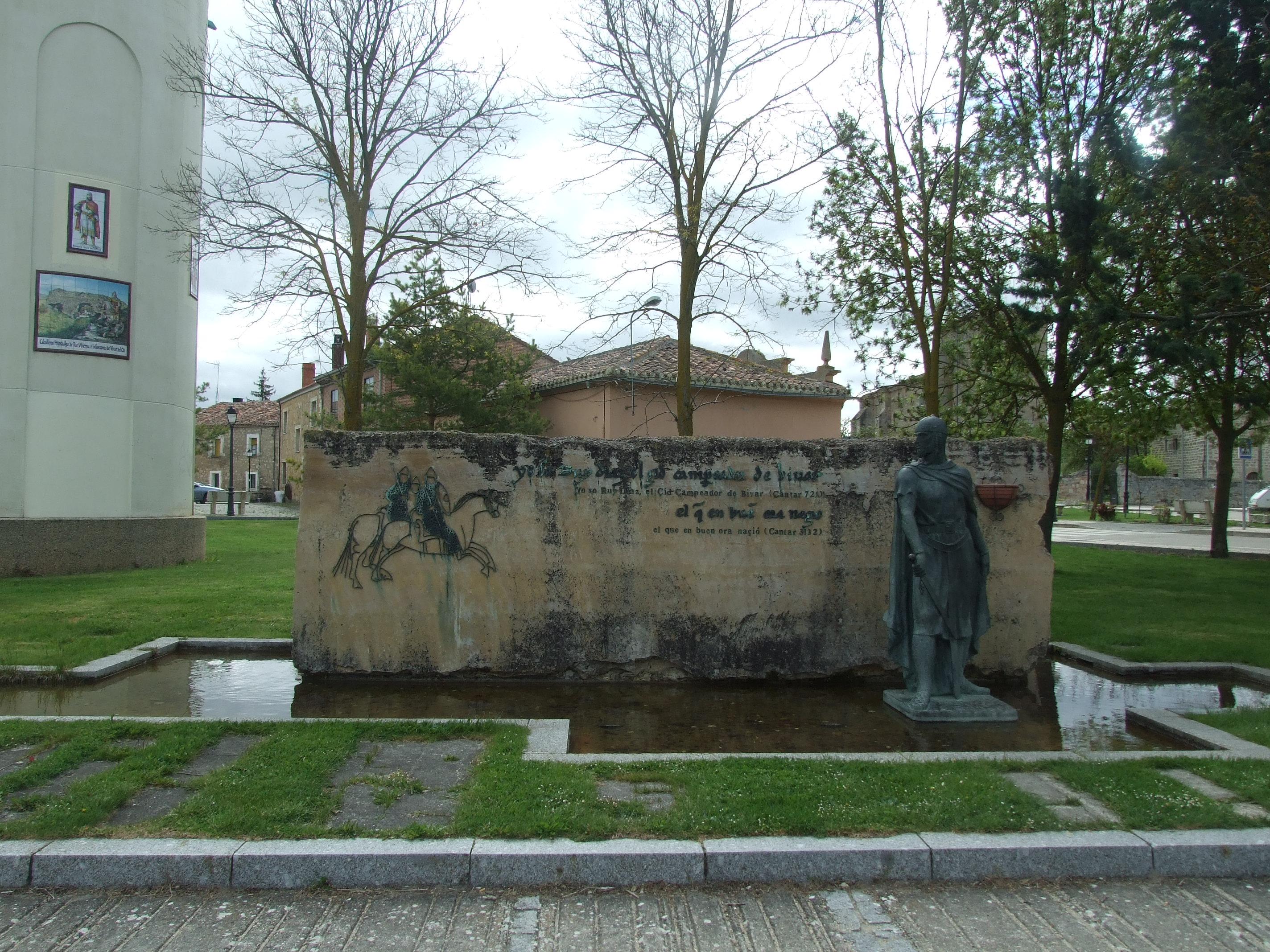
Monument to El Cid.

Vivar, or Vivar del Cid, is a village of approximately 260 inhabitants, part of the municipality of Quintanilla Vivar, located 7 kilometers (4.3 mi) from Burgos, Spain.

Tradition holds that the village was the birthplace of Rodrigo Díaz de Vivar, El Cid, as first written in the Castilian epic poem Cantar de Mio Cid.

== Celebrations ==
- San Antonio de Padua (June 13)
- Homage celebrations to D. Rodrigo Díaz de Vivar. July. (Medieval dinners).
- Maundy Thursday procession. (The three falls of Christ).
- Patron saint: Saint Michael Arcangel, 29 November.

== Monuments ==
- Church of Saint Michael
- Monument to El Cid Campeador at the Solar del Cid.
- Convent of Nuestra Señora del Espino: Founded by Pedro López Padilla and his wife Isabel Pacheco Padilla in 1477. The manuscript of the Cantar de mio Cid (Lay of the Cid) was kept in its library. Nowadays it is at the National Library.
- The Cid's windmill: starting point of the Camino del Cid.
