= Santa Gadea =

Church building in Burgos, Spain

Coordinates: 42.3390°N 3.7060°W

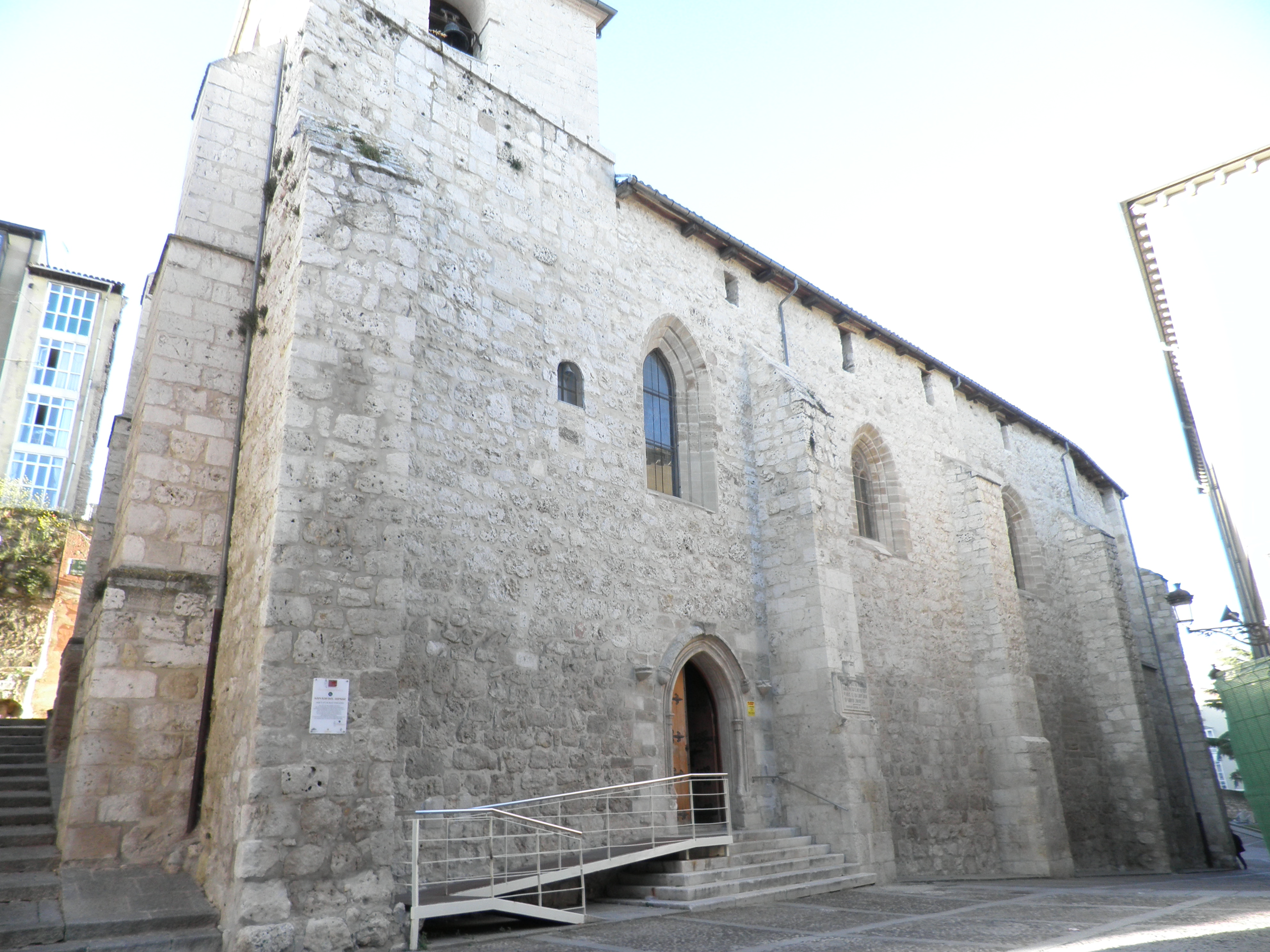
A side facade of the church

Santa Gadea (Spanish: Iglesia de Santa Águeda) is a church dedicated to Saint Agatha in Burgos, Spain. The church is famous in history and literature for being the site where Rodrigo Díaz de Vivar (El Cid) at the behest of the Castilian Cortes, forced Alfonso VI to swear an oath that he was not an accomplice in the death of his brother, Sancho while he was besieging Zamora. Es el de la jura de Santa Gadea is the most notable Spanish medieval romance about this event.

The church today is not the same as it was at the time of the swearing of the famous oath, but the place where the event took place is nevertheless marked by an inscription on a plate, positioned on the outside wall beside the church door.
