= Manuel Gallardo =

Manuel Gallardo may refer to:

- Manuel Gallardo (boxer) (fl. 1924), Argentine Olympic boxer
- Manuel Gallardo González (1861–1912), Chilean lawyer and politician
- Manuel Gallardo Leché (1935–2020), Spanish actor, Verano azul et al.
- Manuel Gallardo Paz (1919–1979), Chilean coal miner and politician
- Manuel Gallardo (Salvadoran politician) (1826–1913), three-term president of the Legislative Assembly
