= El Cid =

Castilian warlord and Prince of Valencia from 1094 to 1099

- Prince of Valencia
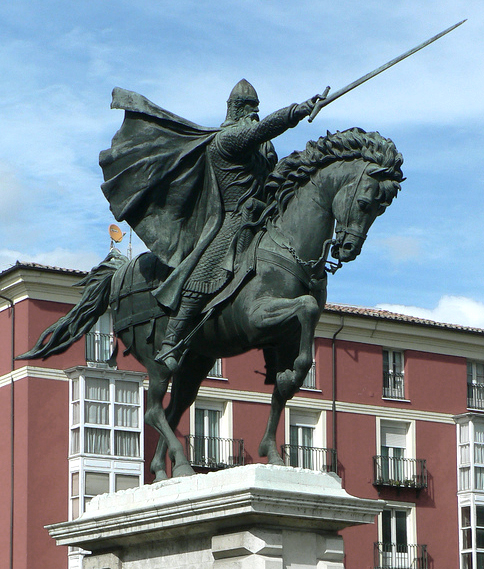
- Statue of El Cid in Burgos, Spain

Prince of Valencia
- Reign: 1094 – 1099
- Coronation: 1094
- Predecessor: Ibn Jahaf
- Successor: Jimena Díaz
- Born: Rodrigo Díaz c. 1043; Vivar, Burgos, Kingdom of León
- Died: 10 July 1099 (aged around 56); Valencia, Lordship of Valencia
- Burial: Burgos Cathedral
- Spouse: Jimena Díaz
- Issue: Diego Rodríguez; Cristina Rodríguez; María Rodríguez
Names
- Rodrigo Díaz de Vivar
- Father: Diego Laínez

Rodrigo Díaz de Vivar (c. 1043 – 10 July 1099) was a Castilian knight and ruler in medieval Spain. Fighting with both Christian and Muslim armies during his lifetime, he earned the Arabic honorific as-Sayyid (السّیّد, "the Lord" or "the Master"), which would evolve into El Çid (Spanish: [el ˈθið], Old Spanish: [el ˈts̻id]), and the Spanish honorific El Campeador ("the Champion"). He was born in Vivar, a village near the city of Burgos.

As the head of his loyal knights, he came to dominate the Levante of the Iberian Peninsula at the end of the 11th century. He reclaimed the Taifa of Valencia from Moorish control for a brief period, ruling the Principality of Valencia from 17 June 1094 until his death in 1099. His wife, Jimena Díaz, inherited the city and maintained it until 1102, when it was reconquered by the Moors.

Díaz de Vivar became well known for his service in the armies of both Christian and Muslim rulers. After his death, El Cid became Spain's most celebrated national hero and the protagonist of the most significant medieval Spanish epic poem, El Cantar de mio Cid, which presents him as the ideal medieval knight: strong, valiant, loyal, just, and pious.

There are various theories on his family history, which remains uncertain; however, he was the grandfather of García Ramírez de Pamplona, King of Navarre, who was the first son of his daughter Cristina Rodríguez. To this day, El Cid remains a popular Spanish folk hero and national icon, with his life and deeds remembered in popular culture.

== Summary ==
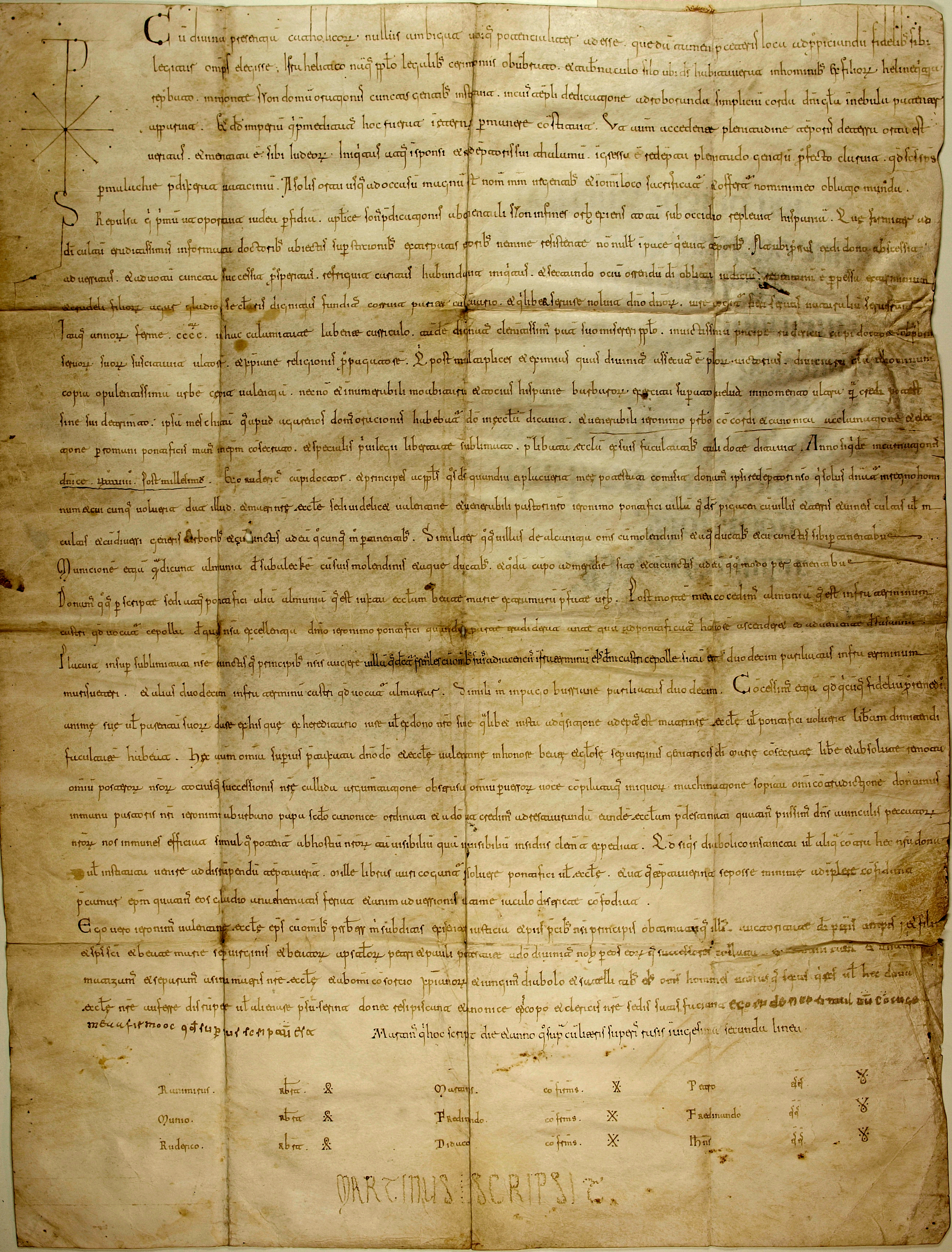
Here on the penultimate and final line of the document's text appears the autograph of Rodrigo Díaz: «ego ruderico, simul cum coniuge mea, afirmo oc quod superius scriptum est.» This translates as "I Rodrigo, together with my wife, affirm that which is written above."

Born a member of the minor nobility, El Cid was brought up at the court of Ferdinand the Great and served Ferdinand's son, Sancho II of Castile and León. He rose to become the commander and royal standard-bearer (armiger regis) of Castile upon Sancho's ascension in 1065. El Cid went on to lead the Castilian military campaigns against Sancho's brothers, Alfonso VI of León and García II of Galicia, as well as in the Muslim kingdoms in al-Andalus. He became renowned for his military prowess in these campaigns, which helped expand the territory of the Crown of Castile at the expense of the Muslims and Sancho's brothers' kingdoms.

When conspirators murdered Sancho in 1072, El Cid found himself in a difficult situation. Since Sancho was childless, the throne passed to his brother Alfonso, whom El Cid had helped remove from power. Although El Cid continued to serve the sovereign, he lost his ranking in the new court, which treated him suspiciously and kept him at arm's length. Finally, in 1081, he was exiled.

El Cid found work fighting for the Muslim rulers of Zaragoza, whom he defended from its traditional enemy, Aragon. While in exile, he regained his reputation as a strategist and formidable military leader. He was repeatedly victorious in battle against the Muslim rulers of Lérida and their Christian allies, as well as against a large Christian army under King Sancho Ramírez of Aragon. In 1086, an expeditionary army of North African Almoravids inflicted a severe defeat to Castile, compelling Alfonso to overcome the resentment he harboured against El Cid. The terms for El Cid's return to Christian service must have been attractive enough since El Cid soon found himself fighting for his former lord. Over the next several years, however, El Cid set his sights on the kingdom city of Valencia, operating more or less independently of Alfonso while politically supporting the Banu Hud and other Muslim dynasties opposed to the Almoravids. He gradually increased his control over Valencia; the Islamic ruler, Yahya al-Qadir, became his tributary in 1092. When the Almoravids instigated an uprising that resulted in the death of al-Qadir, El Cid responded by laying siege to the city. Valencia finally fell in 1094, and El Cid established an independent principality on the Mediterranean coast of Iberia. He ruled over a pluralistic society with the popular support of Christians and Muslims alike.

El Cid's final years were spent fighting the Almoravid Berbers. He inflicted upon them their first major defeat in 1094, on the plains of Caurte, outside Valencia, and continued opposing them until his death. Although El Cid remained undefeated in Valencia, Diego Rodríguez, his only son and heir, died fighting against the Almoravids in the service of Alfonso in 1097. After El Cid died in 1099, his wife, Jimena Díaz, succeeded him as ruler of Valencia, but she was eventually forced to surrender the principality to the Almoravids in 1102.

== Title ==
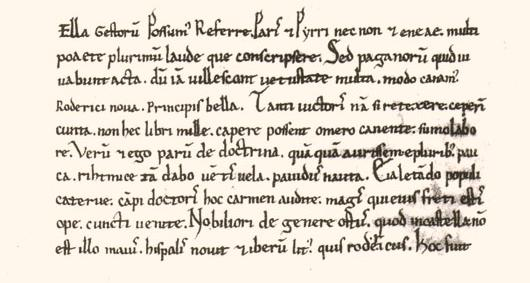
First paragraph of the Carmen Campidoctoris, the earliest literary treatment of El Cid's life, written to celebrate El Cid's defeat of some counts and champions

The name El Cid (Spanish: [el ˈθið]) is a modern Spanish denomination composed of the article el meaning "the" and Cid, which derives from the Old Castilian loan word Çid borrowed from the dialectal Arabic word سيد sîdi or sayyid, which means "lord" or "master". The Mozarabs or the Arabs that served in his ranks may have addressed him in this way, which the Christians may have transliterated and adopted. It has been conjectured that he received the honorific title and respectful treatment of contemporaries in Zaragoza because of his victories in the service of the King of the Taifa of Zaragoza between 1081 and 1086; however, he more likely received the epithet after his conquest of Valencia in 1094.

Historians have not found contemporary records referring to Rodrigo as Cid. Arab sources use instead Rudriq, Ludriq al-Kanbiyatur or al-Qanbiyatur (Rodrigo el Campeador). The title appears for the first time as Meo Çidi in the Poema de Almería, composed between 1147 and 1149.

The cognomen Campeador derives from Latin campi doctor, literally meaning "teacher of the field", but translatable as "master of the battlefield". He probably gained it during the campaigns of King Sancho II of Castile against his brothers, kings Alfonso VI of León and García II of Galicia. While his contemporaries left no historical sources that would have addressed him as Cid, they left plenty of Christian and Arab records, some even signed documents with his autograph, addressing him as Campeador, which prove that he used the Christian cognomen himself. Arabic sources from the late 11th century and early 12th century call him الكنبيطور (al-Kanbīṭūr), القنبيطور (al-Qanbīṭūr), also preceded by Rudrīq or Ludrīq, which are Arabized forms of his title and name, respectively.

The combination of Cid Campeador is documented from 1195 in Linaje de Rodrigo Díaz ("The Lineage of Rodrigo Díaz") in Navarro-Aragonese, which form part of the Liber regum written as mio Cit el Campiador; and in El Cantar de mio Cid.

== Life and career ==
Northern Iberian Peninsula under the rule of Urraca, called the Reckless (la Temeraria) Queen of León, Castile, and Galicia from 1109 until her death.

=== Origins ===
El Cid was born Rodrigo Díaz circa 1043 in Vivar, also known as Castillona de Bivar, a small town about ten kilometers (or six miles) north of Burgos, the capital of Castile. His father, Diego Laínez, was a courtier, bureaucrat, and cavalryman who had fought in several battles. Despite the fact that El Cid's mother's family was aristocratic, in later years, the peasants would consider him one of their own. However, his relatives were not major court officials; documents show that El Cid's paternal grandfather, Laín, confirmed only five documents of Ferdinand I's; his maternal grandfather, Rodrigo Álvarez, certified only two of Sancho II's; and El Cid's father confirmed only one.

=== Service under Sancho II ===
As a young man in 1057, El Cid fought against the Moorish stronghold of Zaragoza, making its emir al-Muqtadir a vassal of Sancho. In the spring of 1063, El Cid fought in the Battle of Graus, where Ferdinand's half-brother, Ramiro I of Aragon, was laying siege to the Moorish town of Graus, which was fought on Zaragozan lands in the valley of the river Cinca. Al-Muqtadir, accompanied by Castilian troops including El Cid, fought against the Aragonese. The party slew Ramiro I, setting the Aragonese army on the run, and emerged victorious. One legend has said that during the conflict, El Cid killed an Aragonese knight in single combat, thereby receiving the honorific title "Campeador".

When Ferdinand died, Sancho continued to enlarge his territory, conquering both Christian strongholds and the Moorish cities of Zamora and Badajoz. When Sancho learned that Alfonso was planning on overthrowing him in order to gain his territory, Sancho sent Cid to bring Alfonso back so that Sancho could speak to him.

=== Service under Alfonso VI ===
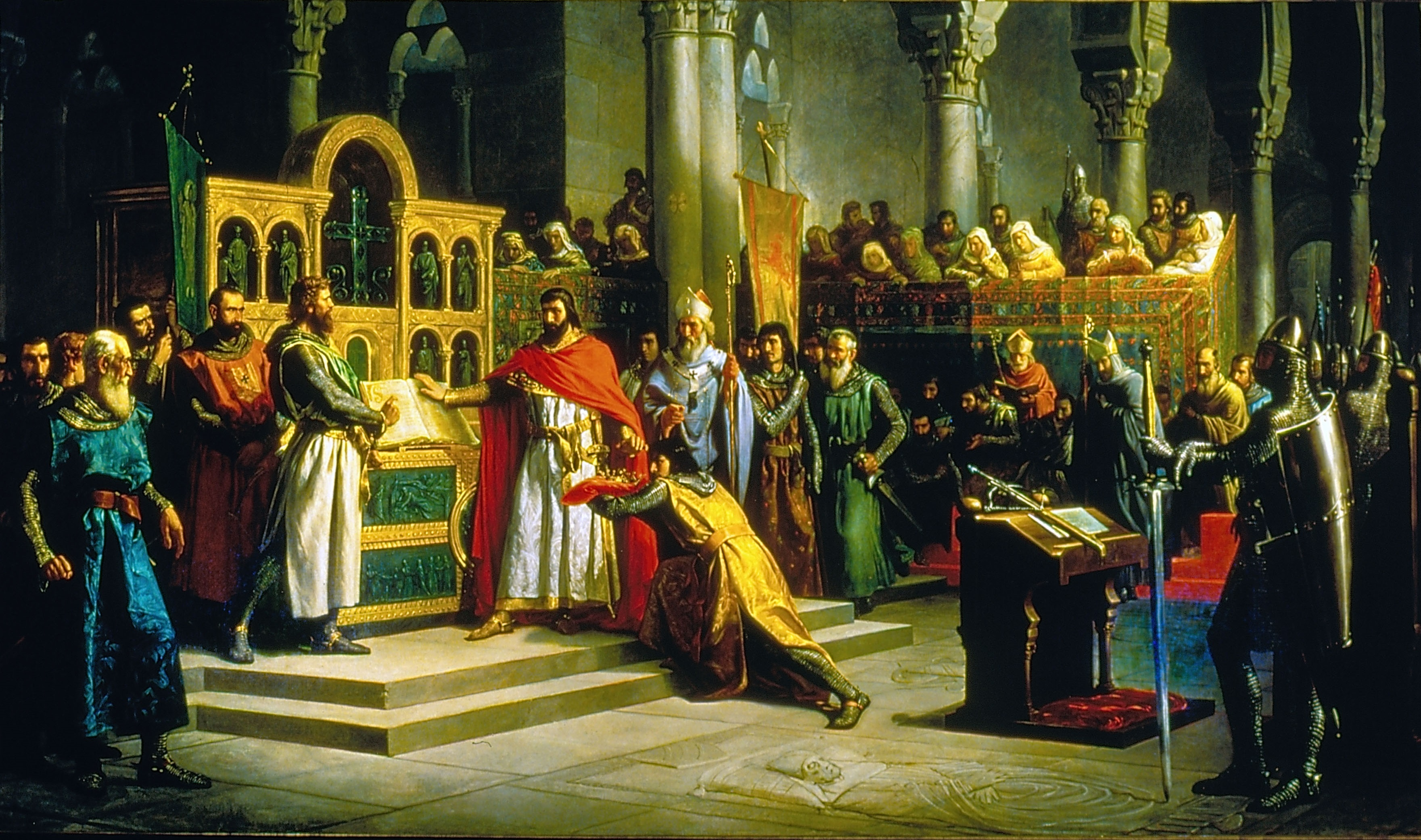
Marcos Giráldez de Acosta painting (1864) depicting the "Santa Gadea Oath". In the middle of the scene, Alfonso VI (with red cape) is swearing with his right hand on the Bible that he did not take part in the murder of his brother Sancho II, while El Cid stands as a witness in front of him.

Sancho was assassinated in 1072, during a siege of his sister's town of Zamora. Since Sancho died unmarried and childless, all of his power passed to his brother Alfonso who, almost immediately, returned from exile in Toledo and took his seat as king of Castile and León. He was, however, deeply suspected of having been involved in Sancho's murder. According to the 11th century epic poem Cantar de mio Cid, the Castilian nobility led by El Cid and a dozen "oath-helpers" forced Alfonso to swear publicly on holy relics multiple times in front of Santa Gadea (Saint Agatha) Church in Burgos that he did not participate in the plot to kill his brother. This is not mentioned in the more reliable 12th century chronicle Historia Roderici, however. El Cid's position as armiger regis was taken away and given to his enemy, Count García Ordóñez.

In 1079, El Cid was sent by Alfonso VI to Seville to the court of al-Mutamid to collect the parias owed by that taifa to León–Castile. While he was there Granada, assisted by other Castilian knights, attacked Seville, and El Cid and his forces repulsed the Christian and Grenadine attackers at the Battle of Cabra, in the (probably mistaken) belief that he was defending the king's tributary. During the aftermath of this battle the Muslim troops under El Cid's command would hail him as Sayyidi. Count García Ordóñez and the other Castilian leaders were taken captive and held for three days before being released.

=== Exile ===
In the Battle of Cabra (1079), El Cid rallied his troops and turned the battle into a rout of Emir Abdullah of Granada and his ally García Ordóñez. This unauthorized expedition into Granada, however, greatly angered Alfonso and May 8, 1080, was the last time El Cid confirmed a document in King Alfonso's court. The most likely reason was El Cid's incursion into Toledo, which happened to be under the control of Alfonso's vassal, Yahya Al-Qadir. Alfonso's anger over El Cid's unsanctioned incursion into his vassal's territory would lead him to exile the knight. This is the generally accepted reason for the exile of El Cid, although several others are plausible and indeed may have been contributing factors to the exile: jealous nobles turning Alfonso against El Cid through court intrigue, and Alfonso's own personal animosity towards El Cid. The song of El Cid and subsequent tales state that Alfonso's and his court's animosity toward Rodrigo was the primary reason the expulsion of the knights from León, as well as a possible misappropriation of some of the tribute from Seville by El Cid.

At first he went to Barcelona, where Berenguer Ramon II refused his offer of service.

== Moorish service ==
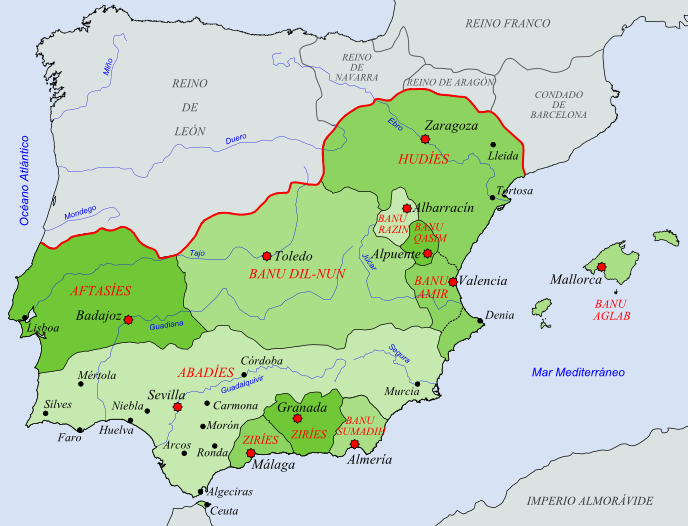
During his service to the Taifa of Zaragoza, he had gained a prominent reputation and the title El Cid (the lord). He is also known to have developed links with the other Taifas in 1080.

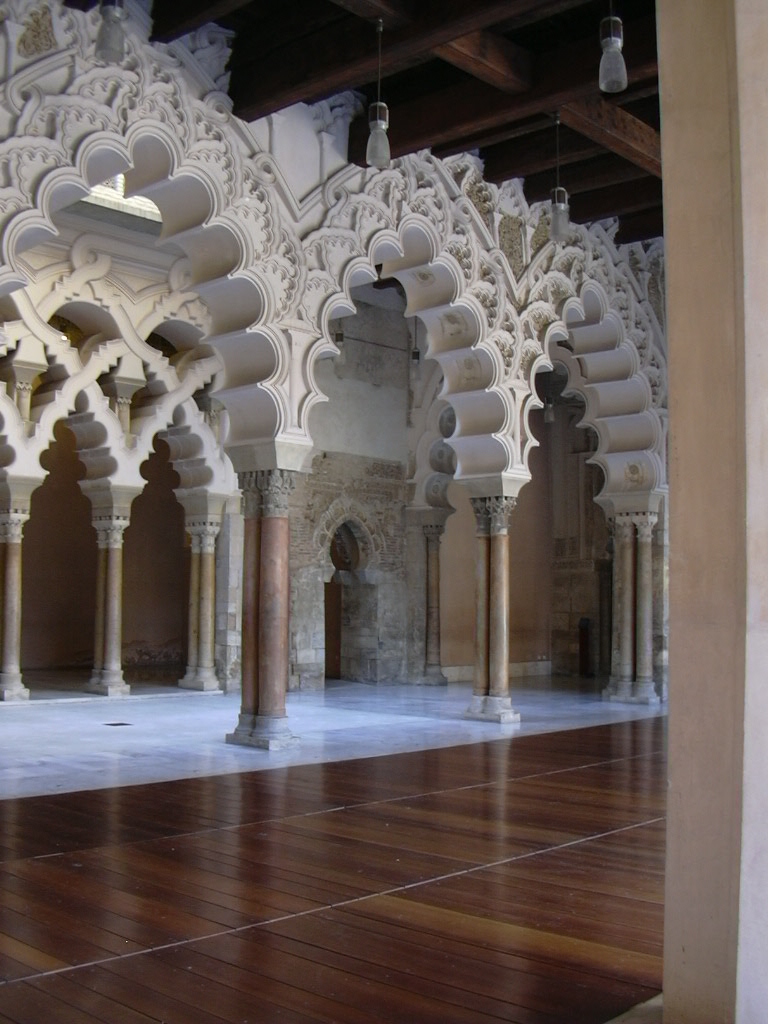
Detail of the Aljafería palace, in the Taifa of Zaragoza

The exile was not the end of El Cid, either physically or as an important figure. After being rejected by Berenguer Ramon II, El Cid journeyed to the Taifa of Zaragoza, where he received a warmer welcome. In 1081, El Cid went on to offer his services to the king of Zaragoza, Yusuf al-Mu'taman ibn Hud, and served both him and his successor, al-Musta'in II. He was given the title El Cid (The Master) and served as a leading figure in a diverse Moorish force consisting of Muwallads, Berbers, Arabs, and Malians within the respective Taifa.

According to Moorish accounts:

Andalusi Knights found El Cid their foe ill, thirsty and exiled from the court of Alfonso, he was presented before the elderly Yusuf al-Mu'taman ibn Hud and accepted command of the forces of the Taifa of Zaragoza as their Master.

In his History of Medieval Spain (Cornell University Press, 1975), Joseph F. O'Callaghan writes:

That kingdom was divided between al-Mutamin (1081–1085) who ruled Zaragoza proper, and his brother al-Mundhir, who ruled Lérida and Tortosa. El Cid entered al-Mutamin's service and successfully defended Zaragoza against the assaults of al-Mundhir, Sancho I of Aragón, and Ramon Berenguer II, whom he held captive briefly in 1082.

In 1082, the army of the Taifa of Zaragoza under El Cid defeated the Taifa of Lleida at the Battle of Almenar. In 1084, he defeated the Aragonese at the Battle of Morella near Tortosa, but in autumn the Castilians started a loose siege of Toledo and later the next year the Christians captured Salamanca, a stronghold of the Taifa of Toledo.

In 1086, the Almoravid invasion of the Iberian Peninsula, through and around Gibraltar, began. The Almoravids, a Berber dynasty from North Africa, led by Yusuf ibn Tashfin, were asked to help defend the divided Moors from Alfonso. The Almoravid army, joined by that of several Taifas, including Badajoz, Málaga, Granada, Tortosa and Seville, defeated a combined army of León, Aragón, and Castile at the Battle of Sagrajas.

In 1087, Raymond of Burgundy and his Christian allies attempted to weaken the Taifa of Zaragoza's northernmost stronghold by initiating the Siege of Tudela and Alfonso captured Aledo, Murcia, blocking the route between the Taifas in the eastern and western Iberian Peninsula.

== Recall from exile ==
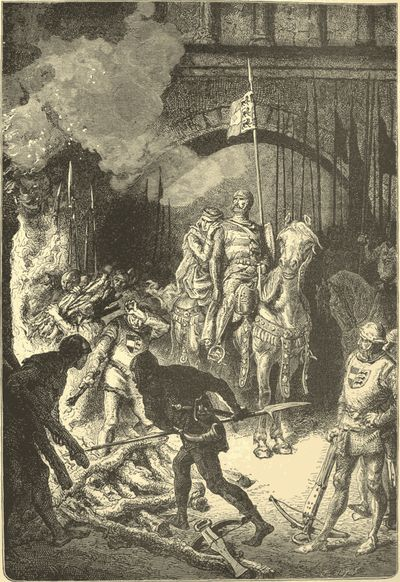
El Cid ordering the execution of Almoravid allies after his conquest of Valencia in 1094

Battle of Cuarte (21 October 1094). El Cid's troops are in green, Almoravid troops are in red.

Terrified after his crushing defeat, Alfonso recalled El Cid, rewarding him lavishly with lands and lordships, such as the fortress of Gormaz. In the year 1087 Alfonso sent him to negotiate with the emboldened Taifa kingdoms.

El Cid returned to Alfonso, but now he had his own plans. He only stayed a short while and then returned to Zaragoza. El Cid was content to let the Almoravid armies and the armies of Alfonso fight without his help, even when there was a chance that the Almoravids might defeat Alfonso and take over all of Alfonso's lands. El Cid chose not to fight because he was hoping that both armies would weaken themselves.

=== Conquest of Valencia ===
Around this time, El Cid, with a combined Christian and Moorish army, began maneuvering in order to create his own fief in the Moorish Mediterranean coastal city of Valencia. Several obstacles lay in his way. First was Berenguer Ramon II, who ruled nearby Barcelona. In May 1090, El Cid defeated and captured Berenguer in the Battle of Tébar (nowadays Pinar de Tévar, near Monroyo, Teruel). Berenguer was later released and his nephew Ramon Berenguer III married El Cid's youngest daughter Maria to ward against future conflicts.

Along the way to Valencia, El Cid also conquered other towns, many of which were near Valencia, such as El Puig and Quart de Poblet.

El Cid gradually came to have more influence in Valencia, then ruled by Yahya al-Qadir, of the Hawwara Berber Dhulnunid dynasty. In October 1092 an uprising occurred in Valencia, inspired by the city's chief judge Ibn Jahhaf and the Almoravids. El Cid began a siege of Valencia. A December 1093 attempt to break the siege failed. By the time the siege ended in May 1094, El Cid had carved out his own principality on the coast of the Mediterranean. Officially, El Cid ruled in the name of Alfonso; in practice, El Cid was fully independent. The city was both Christian and Muslim, and both Moors and Christians served in the army and as administrators. Jerome of Périgord was made bishop.

=== Death ===
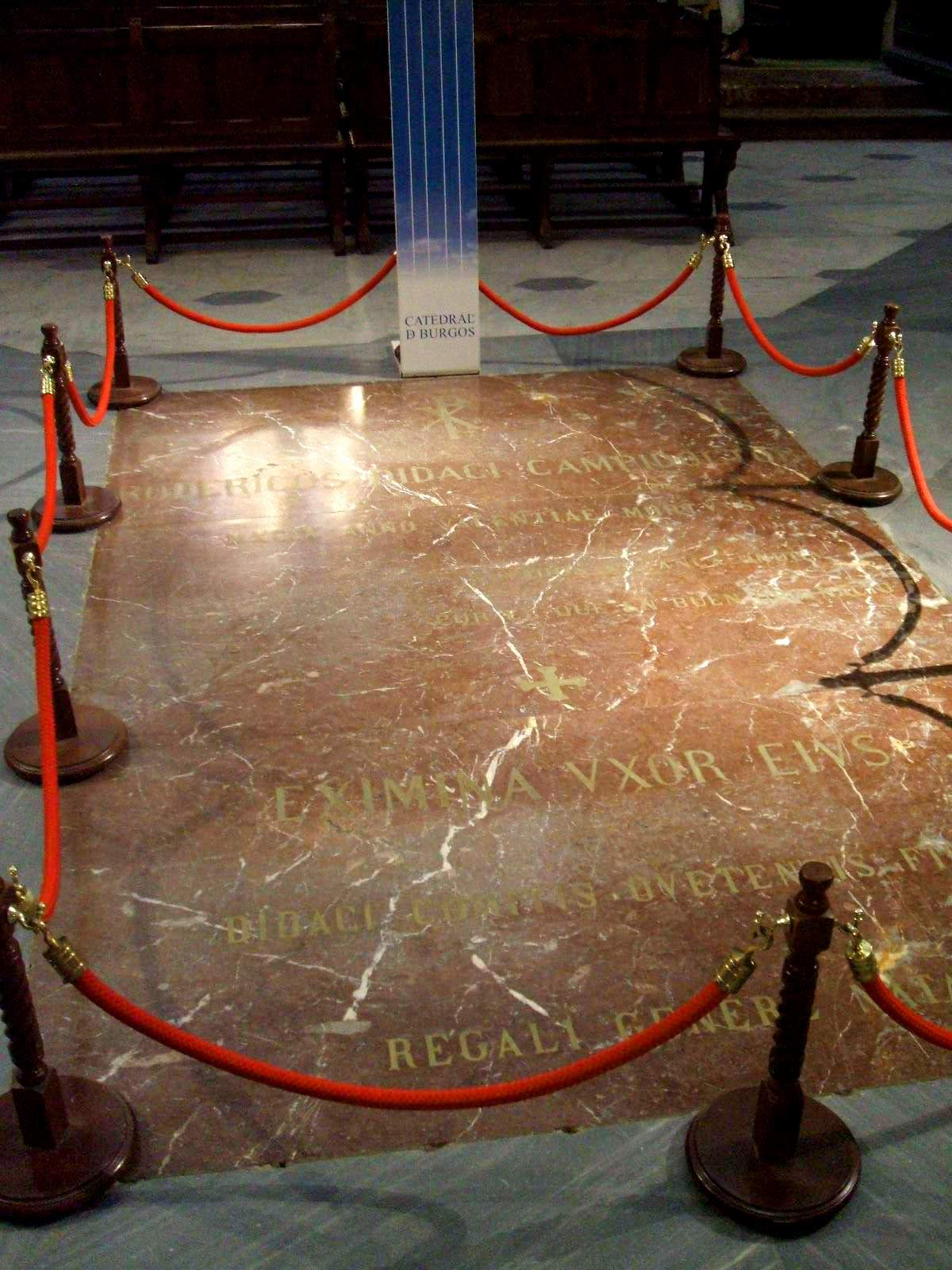
Tomb of El Cid and his wife Doña Jimena in Burgos Cathedral in Spain

El Cid and his wife Jimena Díaz lived peacefully in Valencia until the Almoravids besieged the city. But he defeated them and died 5 years later, on July 10, 1099.

Afterward Valencia was captured by Mazdali on May 5, 1102. Jimena fled to Burgos, Castile, in 1101. She rode into the town with her retinue and the body of El Cid. Originally buried in Castile in the monastery of San Pedro de Cardeña, his body now lies at the center of Burgos Cathedral.

=== Legend of posthumous victory ===
After his demise, but still during the siege of Valencia, legend holds that Jimena ordered that the corpse of El Cid be fitted with his armor and set on his horse, Babieca, to bolster the morale of his troops. In several variations of the story, the dead Rodrigo and his knights win a thundering charge against Valencia's besiegers, resulting in a war-is-lost-but-battle-is-won catharsis for generations of Christian Spaniards to follow. It is believed that the legend originated shortly after Jimena entered Burgos, and that it is derived from the manner in which Jimena's procession rode into the city, i.e. alongside her deceased husband.

== Warrior and general ==
=== Battle tactics ===
During his campaigns, El Cid often ordered that books by classic Roman and Greek authors on military themes be read aloud to him and his troops, for both entertainment and inspiration before battle. El Cid's army had a novel approach to planning strategy as well, holding what might be called "brainstorming" sessions before each battle to discuss tactics. They frequently used unexpected strategies, engaging in what modern generals would call psychological warfare—waiting for the enemy to be paralyzed with terror and then attacking them suddenly; distracting the enemy with a small group of soldiers, etc. (El Cid used this distraction in capturing the town of Castejón as depicted in Cantar de mio Cid (The Song of my Cid).) El Cid accepted or included suggestions from his troops. In The Song the man who served him as his closest adviser was his vassal and kinsman Álvar Fáñez "Minaya" (meaning "My brother", a compound word of Spanish possessive Mi (My) and Anaia, the basque word for brother), although the historical Álvar Fáñez remained in Castile with Alfonso VI.

=== Babieca ===
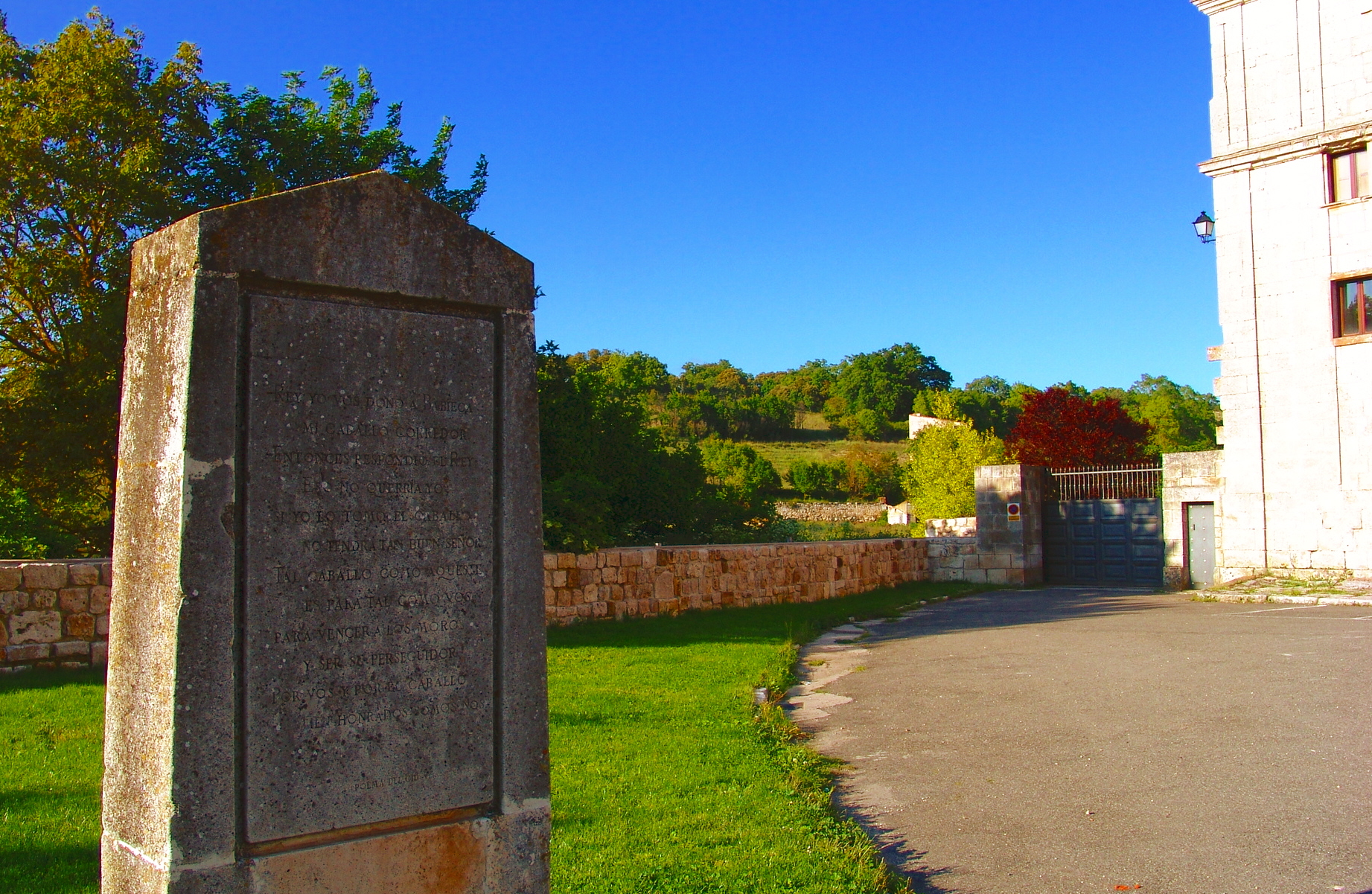
Tomb of Babieca at the monastery of San Pedro de Cardeña

Babieca, or Bavieca, was El Cid's warhorse. Several stories exist about El Cid and Babieca. One well-known legend about El Cid describes how he acquired the stallion. According to this story, Rodrigo's godfather, Pedro El Grande, was a monk at a Carthusian monastery. Pedro's coming-of-age gift to El Cid was his pick of a horse from an Andalusian herd. El Cid picked a horse that his godfather thought was a weak, poor choice, causing the monk to exclaim "Babieca!" (stupid!). Hence, it became the name of El Cid's horse. Another legend states that in a competition of battle to become King Sancho's "Campeador", or champion, a knight on horseback wished to challenge El Cid. The King wished a fair fight and gave El Cid his finest horse, Babieca, or Bavieca. This version says Babieca was raised in the royal stables of Seville and was a highly trained and loyal war horse, not a foolish stallion. The name in this instance could suggest that the horse came from the Babia region in León, Spain. In the poem Carmen Campidoctoris, Babieca appears as a gift from "a barbarian" to El Cid, so its name could also be derived from "Barbieca", or "horse of the barbarian".

Regardless, Babieca became a great warhorse, famous to the Christians, feared by El Cid's enemies, and loved by El Cid, who allegedly requested that Babieca be buried with him in the monastery of San Pedro de Cardeña. Babieca is mentioned in several tales and historical documents about El Cid, including The Lay of El Cid.

=== Swords ===
A weapon traditionally identified as El Cid's sword, Tizona, used to be displayed in the Army Museum (Museo del Ejército) in Toledo. In 1999, a small sample of the blade underwent metallurgical analysis which confirmed that the blade was made in Moorish Córdoba in the eleventh century and contained amounts of Damascus steel.

In 2007, the Autonomous Community of Castile and León bought the sword for €1.6 million, and it is currently on display at the Museum of Burgos.

El Cid also had a sword called Colada.

== Wife and children ==
El Cid depicted on the title page of a 16th-century working of his story

El Cid married Jimena Díaz, who was said to be part of an aristocratic family from Asturias, in the mid-1070s. The Historia Roderici calls her a daughter of a Count Diego Fernández de Oviedo. Tradition states that when El Cid first laid eyes on her, he was enamoured of her great beauty. El Cid and Jimena had two daughters, Cristina and María, and a son. The latter, Diego Rodríguez, was killed while fighting against the invading Muslim Almoravids from North Africa at the Battle of Consuegra in 1097. El Cid's daughters Cristina Rodríguez and María both married into noble families. Cristina married Ramiro, Lord of Monzón and grandson of García Sánchez III of Navarre.

Her own son, El Cid's grandson, would be elevated to the throne of Navarre as King García Ramírez. The other daughter, María (also known as Sol), is said first to have married a prince of Aragon, presumably the son of Peter I, and she later married Ramon Berenguer III, count of Barcelona. Both the poem and the chronicle may state a previous marriage to the infantes de Carrión; however, these marriages are not a historical fact and are an important element in the construction of the poem.

== In literature, music, video games, and film ==
The figure of El Cid has been the source for many literary works, beginning with the Cantar de mio Cid, an epic poem from the 12th century which gives a partly-fictionalized account of his life, and was one of the early chivalric romances. This poem, along with similar later works such as the Mocedades de Rodrigo, contributed to portray El Cid as a chivalric hero of the Reconquista, making him a legendary figure in Spain. El Cid is one of the few examples of knight errantry formally recognized by the priest in Miguel de Cervantes's Don Quixote (1605–1615).

In the early 17th century, the Spanish writer Guillén de Castro wrote a play called Las Mocedades del Cid, on which French playwright Pierre Corneille based one of his most famous tragicomedies, Le Cid. He was also a popular source of inspiration for Spanish writers of the Romantic period, such as Juan Eugenio Hartzenbusch, who wrote La Jura de Santa Gadea, or José Zorrilla, who wrote a long poem called La Leyenda del Cid. In 2019, Arturo Pérez-Reverte published the novel Sidi.

Herman Melville references El Cid when introducing the character of Samoa in Chapter 21 of Mardi (1849): "He alighted about six paces from where we stood, and balancing his weapon, eyed us bravely as the Cid".

In 1929, Chilean writer Vicente Huidobro published his poetic novel Mío Cid Campeador. Hazaña. This work, together with other novels (and plays) he published between 1929 and 1939, defied the traditional realistic style of the early 20th century Chilean novel. The English version was published in 1931.

Georges Bizet worked on Don Rodrigue in 1873 that was set aside and never completed. Jules Massenet wrote an opera, Le Cid, in 1885, based on Corneille's play of the same name. Claude Debussy began work in 1890 on an opera, Rodrigue et Chimène, which he abandoned as unsuitable for his temperament; it was orchestrated for performance by Edison Denisov circa 1993.

El Cid is portrayed by American actor Charlton Heston in a 1961 epic film of the same name directed by Anthony Mann, where the character of Doña Ximena is portrayed by Italian actress Sophia Loren. In 2020, Amazon Prime Video premiered a Spanish TV series with Jaime Lorente starring as El Cid.

In 1979, Crack, one of the most prominent progressive rock bands from Spain, released their first and only album Si Todo Hiciera Crack including "Marchando una del Cid", a song based on the epic legend of El Cid.

In 1980, Ruy, the Little Cid was an animated series based on El Cid's childhood made by Nippon Animation.

El Cid was described to inspire Ferny about his Spanish heritage in "The Legend of Raloo", episode 16 of season 1 of Jakers! The Adventures of Piggley Winks in 2004.

In the second Age of Empires video game installment, The Conquerors expansion pack, there is a campaign starring El Cid Campeador.

In both the first and second Medieval: Total War games, El Cid appears as a powerful independent general in the castle of Valencia.

In 2003, the Spanish animated film El Cid: The Legend was released.

The Ministry of Time, a Spanish science fiction television series, portrayed El Cid in season 2, episode 1.

El Cid is a playable character in the Mobile/PC Game Rise of Kingdoms.

El Cid is a playable character in Crusader Kings II and Crusader Kings III in start dates corresponding to his historical rule over Valencia.

Capricorn El Cid, one of the Gold Saints from Saint Seiya: The Lost Canvas, is named after El Cid.

== Gallery ==
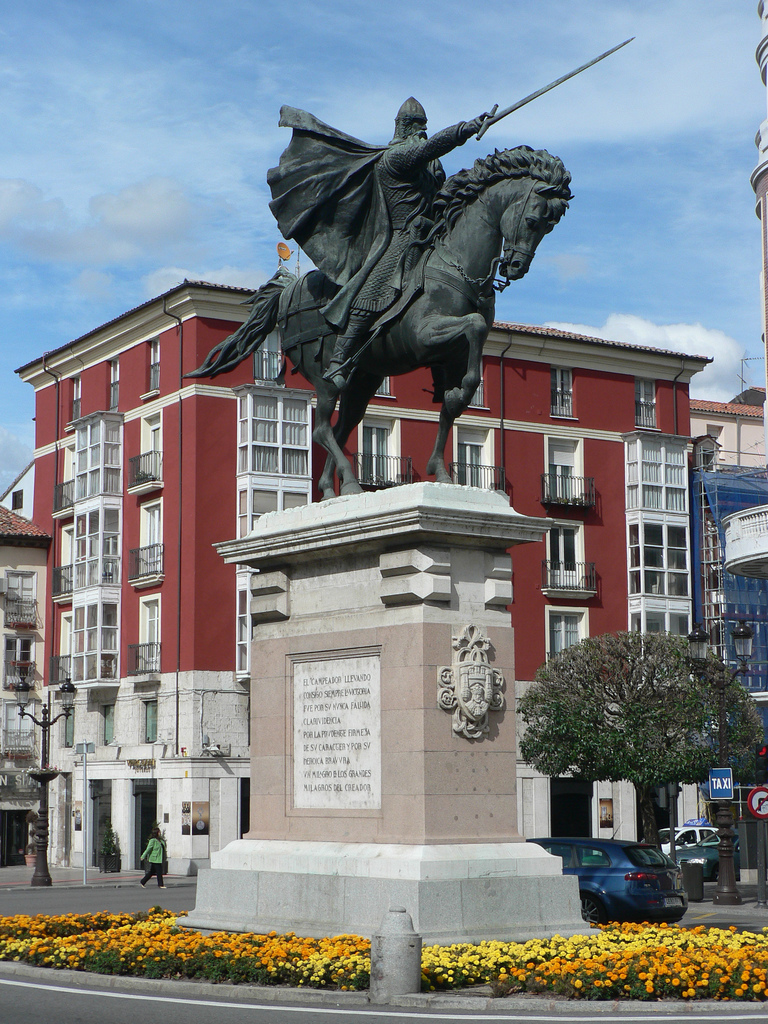
General view of the 1954 Juan Cristóbal González Quesada's statue of El Cid in Burgos

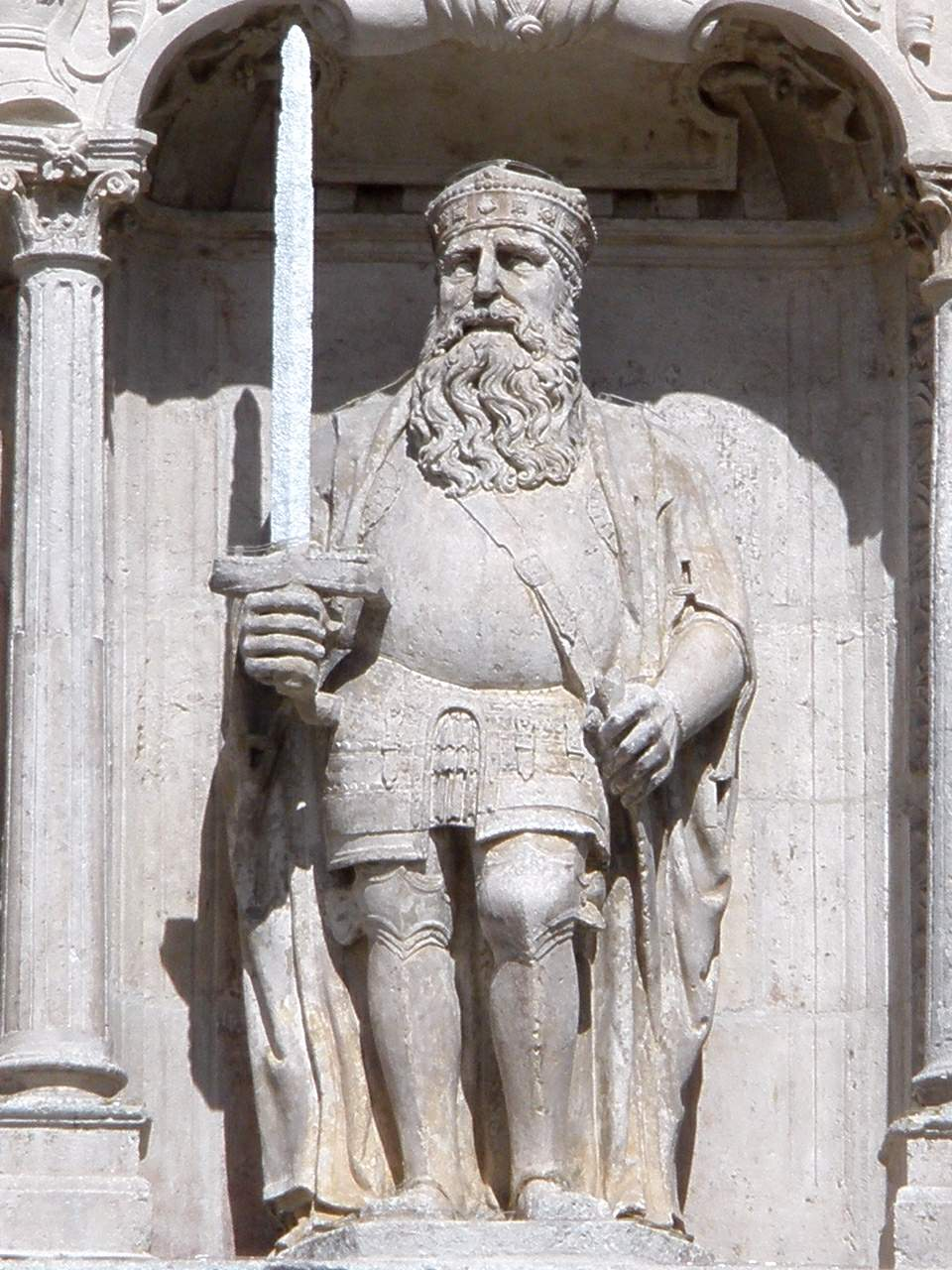
Statue of El Cid included in the 14th- to 15th-century "Santa María" gateway, Burgos

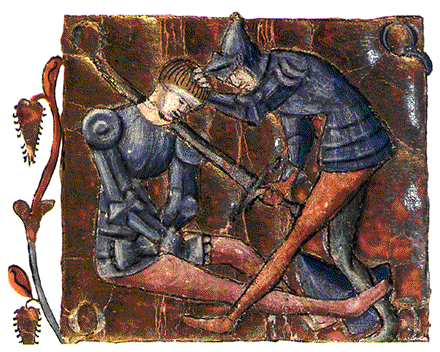
1344 medieval miniature showing the decapitation of Count Lozano by El Cid

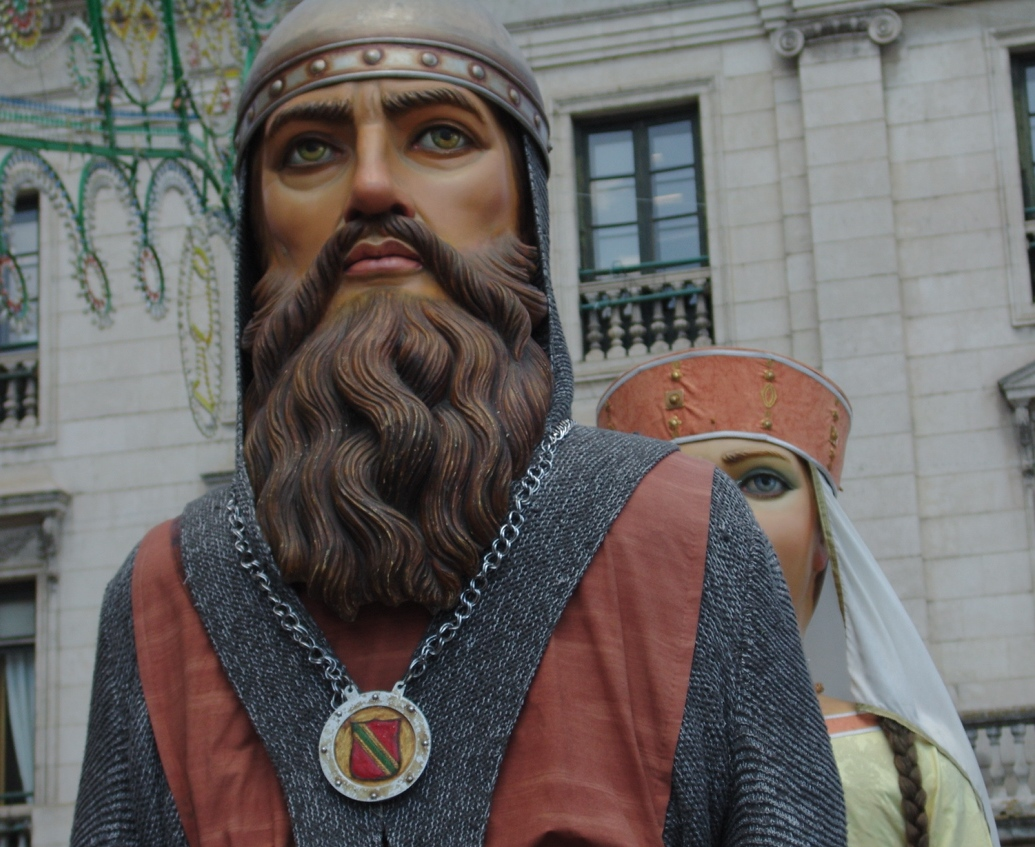
Burgalese traditional representation (called "Gigantones") of El Cid that is taken to the streets during the town major festivity. Doña Jimena's representation is behind.

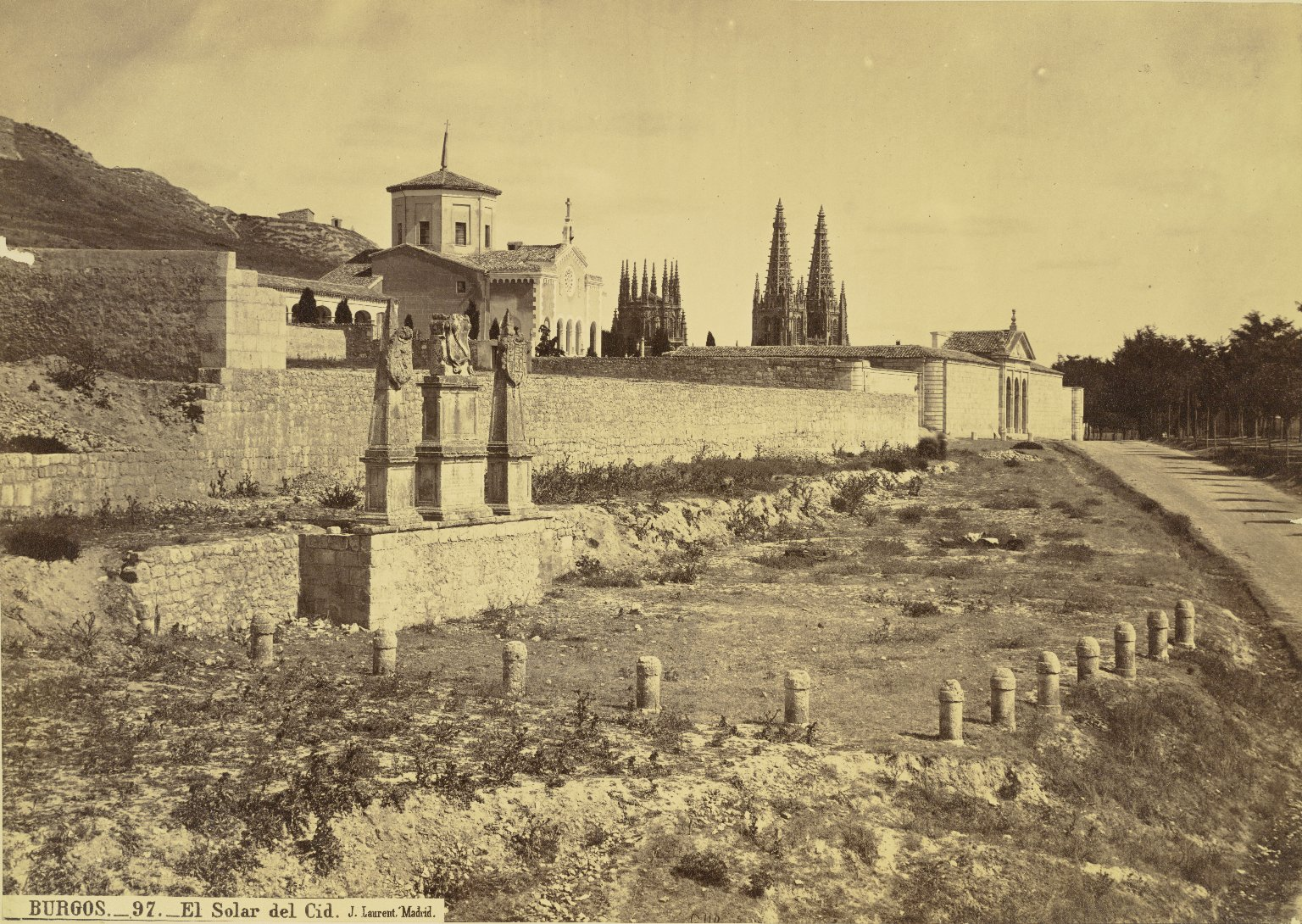
The terrain known as the "Solar del Cid", where his house was located. The monument was erected in 1784. Photo taken in Burgos, c. 1865–1892.

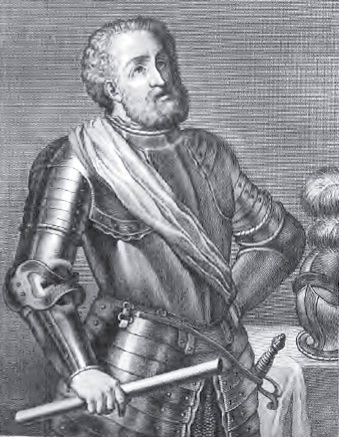
El Cid depiction on the book Portraits of illustrious Spaniards (1791)

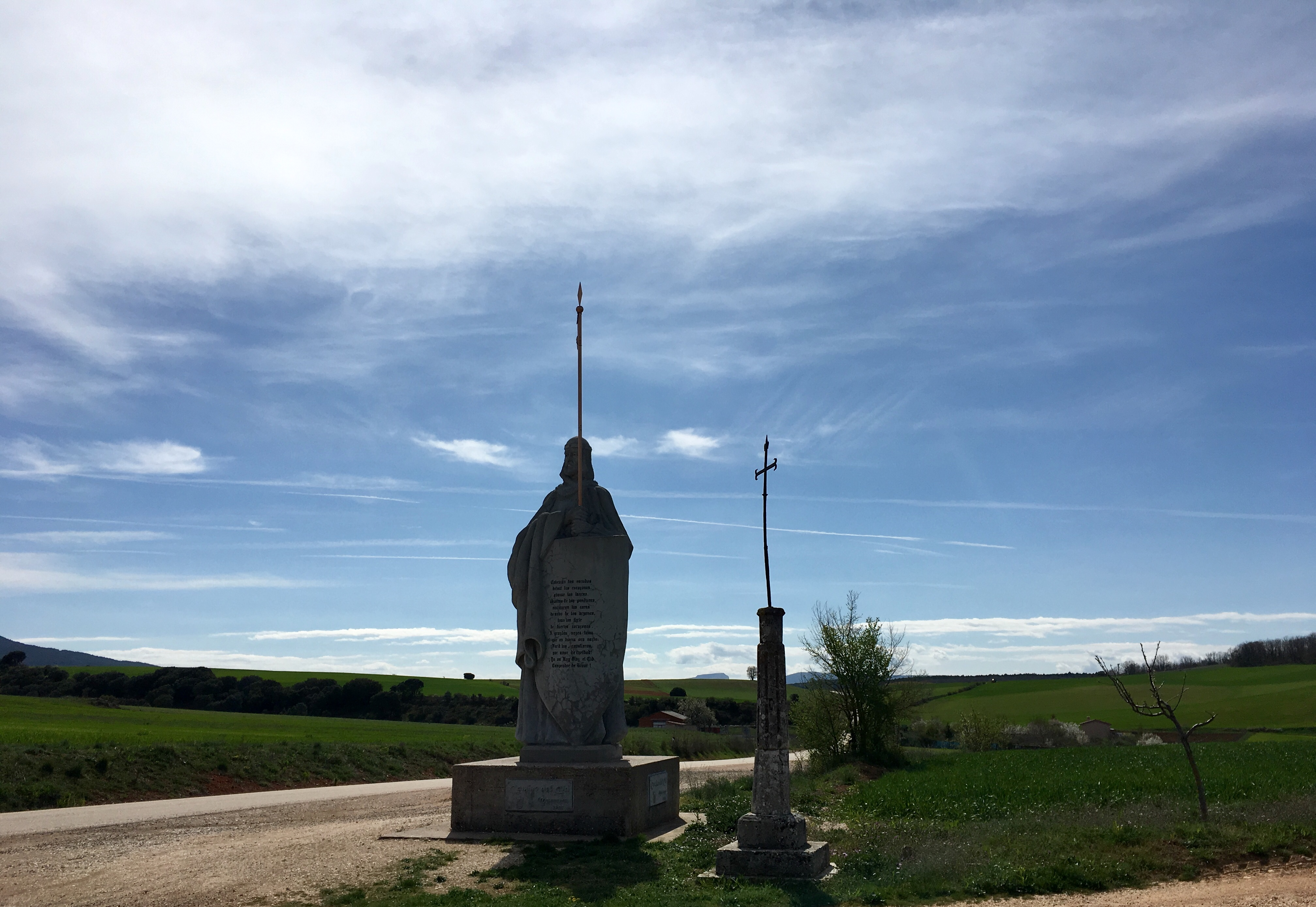
In 2008, this El Cid statue made by Ángel Gil Cuevas was placed in Mecerreyes, at the path of the "Camino del Cid".

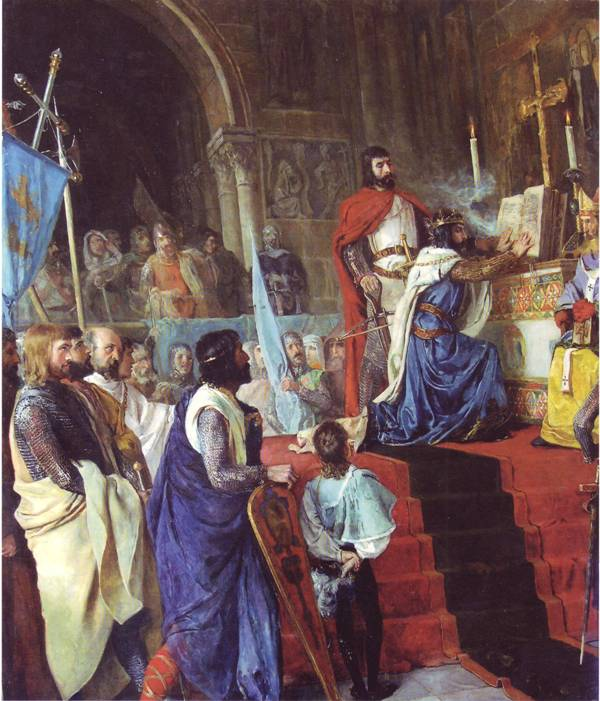
Another version of the "Santa Gadea Oath", painted by Armando Menocal in 1889

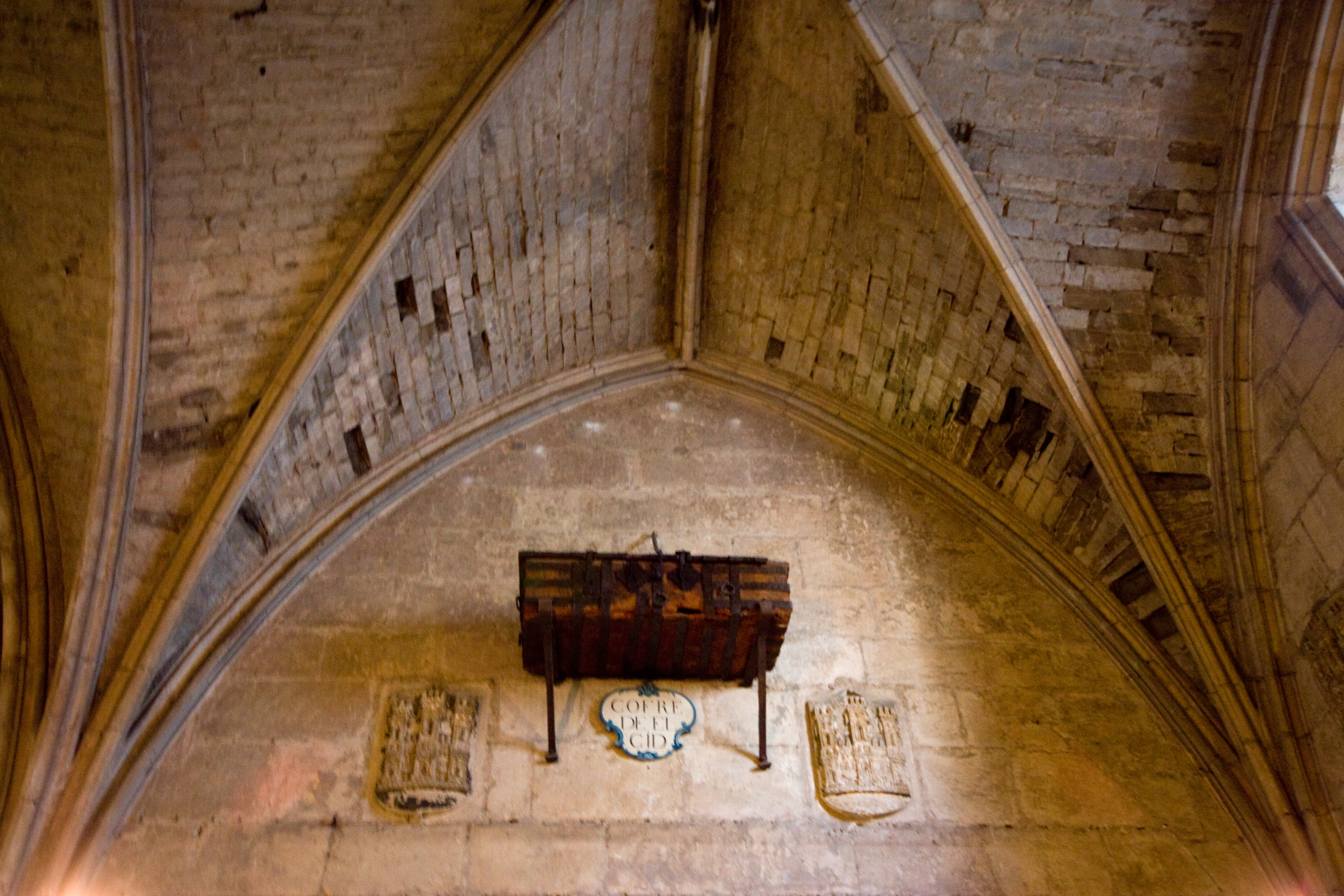
El Cid's chest at Burgos Cathedral

El Cid portrait from The Historians' History of the World

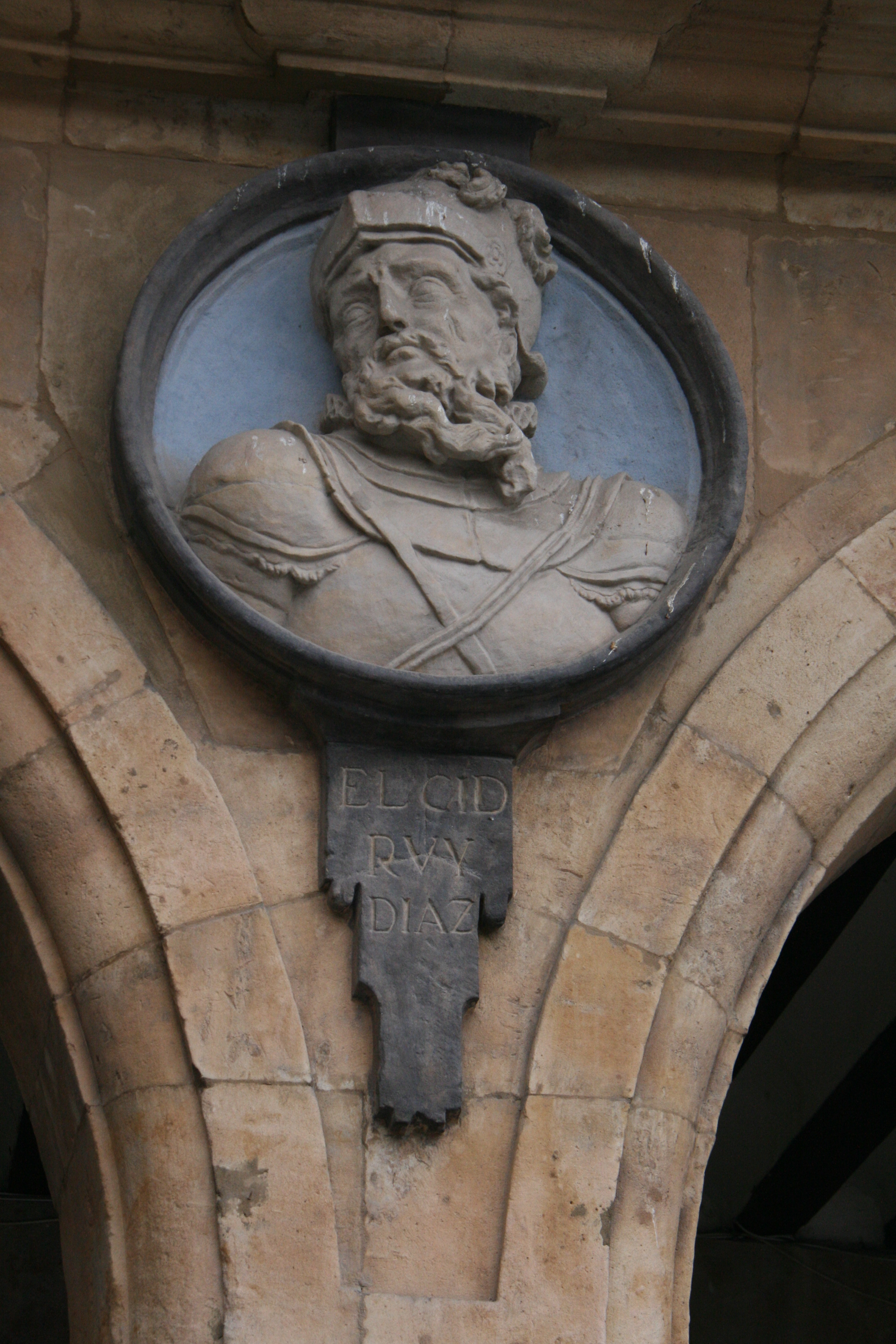
El Cid medallion (1733–34) at the Plaza Mayor, Salamanca

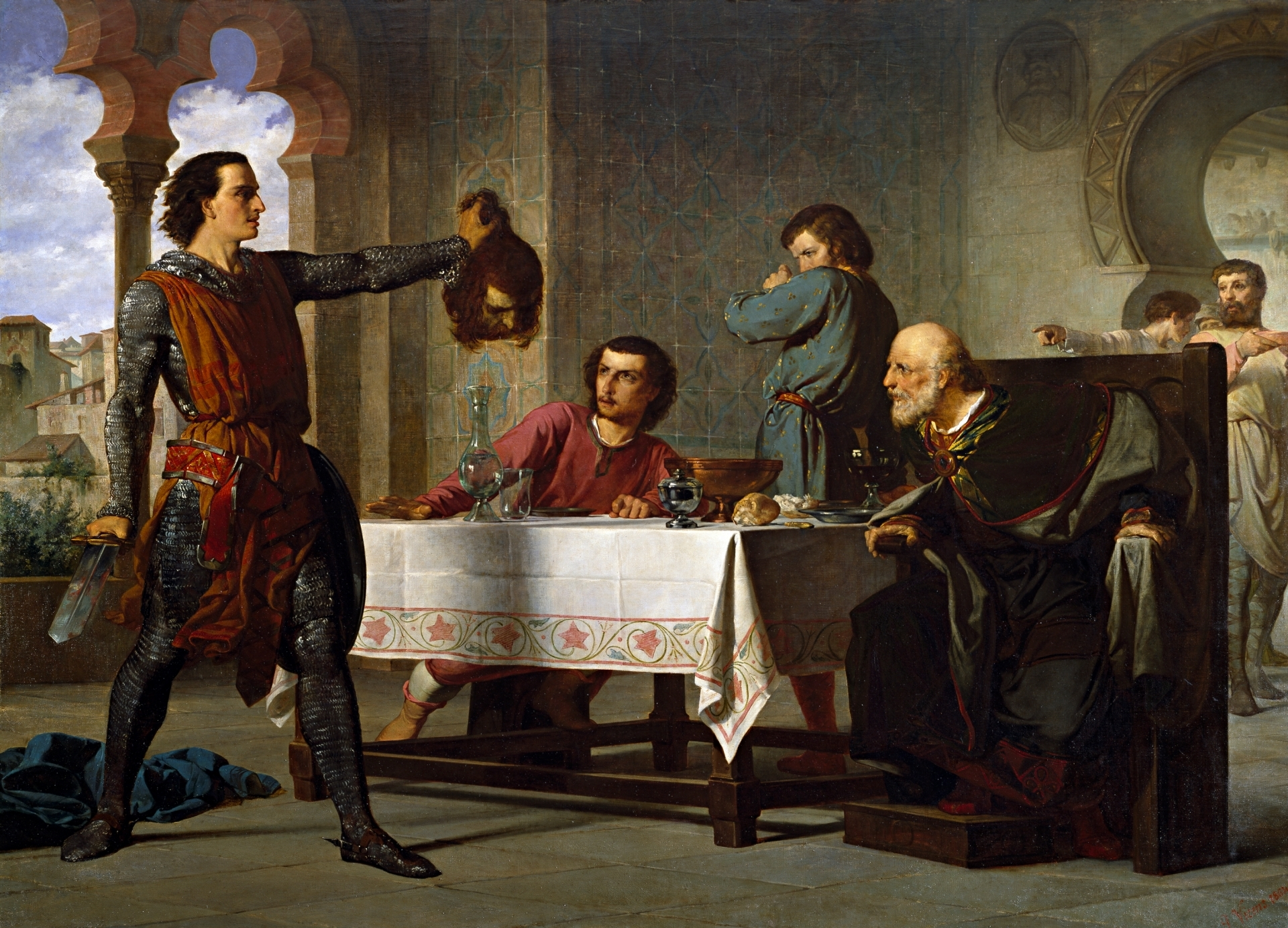
1864 Juan Vicens Cots painting "La Primera hazaña de El Cid" depicts a young Rodrigo Díaz showing his father Diego Laínez the severed head of Count Lozano, the father of his future wife Doña Jimena. Count Lozano had previously mocked and slapped elderly Diego Laínez.

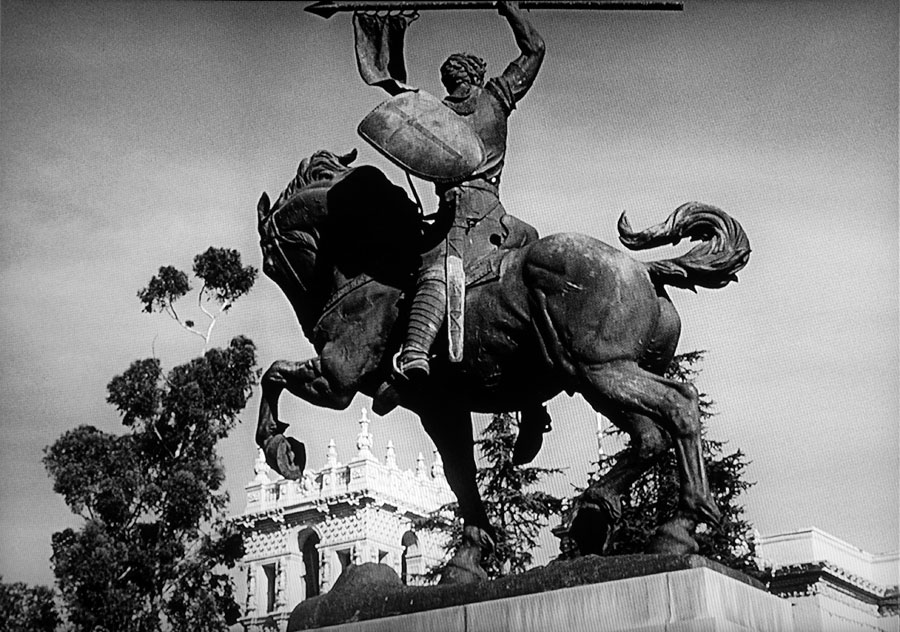
El Cid statue at Balboa Park (San Diego), a filming location for Orson Welles' Citizen Kane.

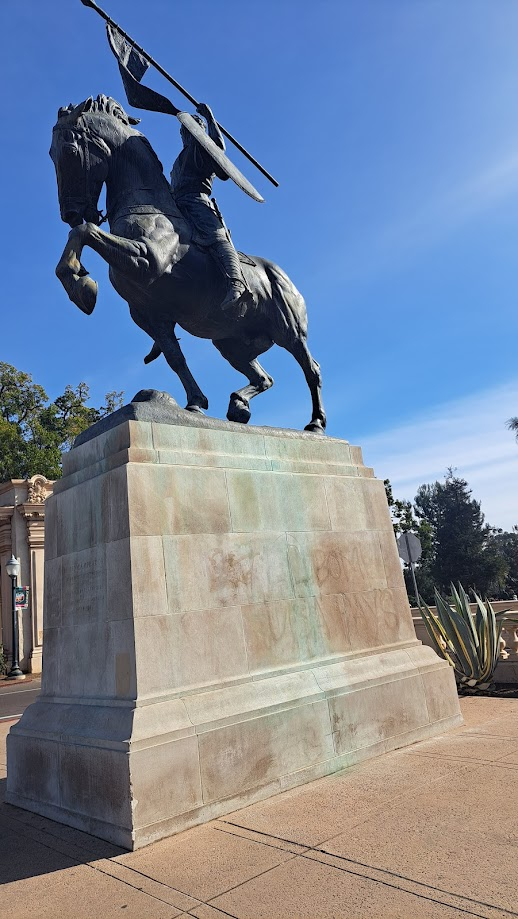
El Cid statue at Balboa Park, San Diego in 2025

== See also ==
- Camino del Cid
- El Cid (TV series)

== General and cited sources ==
=== Primary ===
- Kurtz, Barbara E. El Cid. University of Illinois.
- I. Michael. The Poem of El Cid. Manchester: 1975.
- The Song of El Cid. Translated by Burton Raffel. Penguin Classics, 2009.
- Cantar de mío Cid – Spanish (free PDF)
- Poema de Mio Cid, Códice de Per Abbat in the European Library (third item on page)
- R. Selden Rose and Leonard Bacon (trans.) The Lay of El Cid. Semicentennial Publications of the University of California: 1868–1918. Berkeley: University of California Press, 1997.
- Romancero e historia del muy valeroso caballero El Cid Ruy Díaz de Vibar (1828)
- Cronica del muy esforçado cavallero el Cid ruy diaz campeador (1533)
- Carmen Campidoctoris, a Latin poem on El Cid

=== Secondary (not cited) ===
- Simon Barton and Richard Fletcher. The world of El Cid, Chronicles of the Spanish reconquest. Manchester: University Press, 2000. ISBN 0-7190-5225-4 hardback, ISBN 0-7190-5226-2 paperback.
- Gonzalo Martínez Díez, "El Cid Histórico: Un Estudio Exhaustivo Sobre el Verdadero Rodrigo Díaz de Vivar", Editorial Planeta (Spain, 1999). ISBN 84-08-03161-9
- C. Melville and A. Ubaydli (ed. and trans.), Christians and Moors in Spain, vol. III, Arabic sources (711–1501). (Warminster, 1992).
- Mikaberidze, Alexander, ed. (2011). "Almoravids". Conflict and Conquest in the Islamic World: A Historical Encyclopedia. Vol. I. ABC-CLIO.
- Joseph F. O'Callaghan. A History of Medieval Spain. Ithaca: Cornell University Press, 1975
- Peter Pierson. The History of Spain. Ed. John E. Findling and Frank W. Thacheray. Wesport, CN: Greenwood Press, 1999. 34–36.
- Bernard F. Reilly. The Kingdom of León-Castilla under King Alfonso VI, 1065–1109 Princeton, NJ: University Press, 1988.
- Steven Thomas. 711–1492: Al-Andalus and the Reconquista.
- M. J. Trow,El Cid The Making of a Legend, Sutton Publishing Limited, 2007.
- Henry Edwards Watts. "The Story of El Cid (1026–1099)" in The Christian Recovery of Spain: The Story of Spain from the Moorish Conquest to the Fall of Granada (711–1492 AD). New York: Putnam, 1894. 71–91.
- T.Y. Henderson. "Conquests Of Valencia"
- J. I. Garcia Alonso, J. A. Martinez, A. J. Criado, "Origin of El Cid's sword revealed by ICP-MS metal analysis", Spectroscopy Europe, 11/4 (1999).
- Nora Berend. El Cid: The Life and Afterlife of a Medieval Mercenary. New York: Pegasus Books, 2025. ISBN 978-1-6393-6646-0

Preceded by Ibn Jahaf (as King of Valencia)	Prince of Valencia; 1094–1099	Succeeded by Ximena Díaz (as Lady of Valencia)
