= Fortun =

Fortun or Fortún may refer to:

== People ==
=== Surname ===
- Antonio Fortún (c. 1800-c. 1860), former mayor of Ponce, Puerto Rico
- Elena Fortún (1886–1952), a Spanish children's author
- Julia Elena Fortún (1929–2016), a Bolivian historian, anthropologist, folklorist, and ethnomusicologist
- Kim Fortun, an American anthropologist
- Lawrence Fortun, a Filipino politician
- Rafael Fortún (1919–1982), a sprinter from Cuba

=== Given name ===
- Fortún Galíndez (fl. 924–972), a Navarrese nobleman
- Fortún Garcés of Pamplona (died 922), former King of Pamplona
- Fortún Garcés Cajal (died 1146), a Navarro-Aragonese nobleman and statesman
- Fortún Íñiguez (c. 842), potential co-regent with García Íñiguez of Pamplona
- Fortún Jiménez (count) (fl. 943–58), former count of Aragon
- Fortún Ochoiz (fl. 1013–1050), a Navarrese nobleman
- Fortún Sánchez (died 1054), a Navarrese nobleman
- Fortún Ximénez (died 1533), a Spanish sailor who led a mutiny near Mexico

== Places ==
- Fortun (village), a village in Luster, Norway
