= Battle of Estercuel =

10th-century battle in Muslim Iberia

Coordinates: 42.008304°N 1.512472°W

- Part of the Reconquista
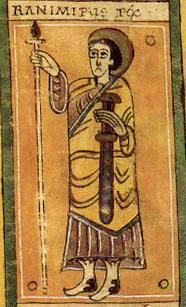
- Contemporary miniature of Ramiro of Viguera (Ranimirus rex, "king Ramiro", according to the superscription), bearing the sword and holding a sceptre, from the Codex Vigilanus
Date	6 July 975
Location	Estercuel, now known as Ribaforada, southeast of Tudela
Result	Córdoban victory

Belligerents
Kingdom of Viguera	Caliphate of Córdoba

Commanders and leaders
Ramiro Garcés of Viguera (WIA)	al-Tuyibi

Strength
500 cavalry	Superior

Casualties and losses
33 killed	Few if any

The Battle of Estercuel took place on 6 July 975 between the forces of the Kingdom of Viguera, under king Ramiro Garcés, and those of the Caliphate of Córdoba, under the kaid of Zaragoza, al-Tuyibi. The battle, a typical skirmish of the Christian–Muslim frontier, was a victory for the Caliphate. Several leading Navarrese magnates were killed and Ramiro was injured.

The kaid of Zaragoza had been a participant in the campaign of Galib ibn Abd al-Rahman in the spring, but he appears to have left the expedition before the victory at the Battle of San Esteban de Gormaz in 978. The forces of the Kingdom of Pamplona, under Sancho II Garcés Abarca, Ramiro's half-brother, were also engaged at Gormaz, where they were defeated alongside the Castilians under García Fernández. The kaid was on the road to Zaragoza when he encountered a Christian army under Ramiro Garcés. The chief source for the encounter is the Muqtabis of Ibn Hayyan, whose account of these years is derived directly from the so-called Anales palatinos ("palatine annals") of Isa ibn Ahmad al-Razi:

. . . upon separating from the army [of Galib] on Tuesday, 22 Sawall [5/6 July], he [al-Tuyibi] ran into the train of the pig Ramiro ibn Sancho, and he followed said train, sending to tell the chief of the advance posts about the mountain Bárdena, on the other side of the river Ebro: "Carefully keep watch for a large troop of cavalry that, at dawn, will cross in the direction of the river". In effect, little time passed before the alarm was given that the enemy had appeared beside the town of Estercuel (a half a day's ride from the city of Tudela, on the royal road that comes up from Zaragoza) and before some Christian cavalry forces had scattered throughout the region, to the right and to the left, in the manner of a raid, and were going about seizing whatever booty they encountered and taking captive five men who were out fishing in those valleys.

The disorderly Christians crossed the river Ebro at a ford and soon had lost four men and one captured. From the captive the kaid learned that the Christian army numbered some 500 cavalrymen who had marched from Sos, Ramiro's chief castle, thinking that the governor of Zaragoza was away in Gormaz. Surprised by the Muslim presence, Ramiro made for the Christian castle of al-Qastil, harassed by the Muslims all the way. According to Ibn Hayyan, the Muslims pursued the Christians until the asr, the afternoon prayer. Probably this chase took place over the semiarid Bardenas mountains, terminating in the wooded valley of the river Aragón, in the region of Carcastillo, Murillo el Fruto, and Santacara. The site of Estercuel was to the southeast of Tudela, today uninhabited.

Although Ramiro made it to safety, thirty-three of his men were killed, among them Fortún Mahunis, Fortún López, Jimeno Fortún, and the adalides (captains) Íñigo Velázquez, Íñigo Galíndez, and García ibn Salit. Another forty-seven were captured and, among Ramiro's baggage, were found a silver-plated horn for calling the troops and a banner.

Ramiro's younger brother, Jimeno, appears as a hostage at the court of al-Hakam II in Córdoba later in 975. It has been speculated that he may have been exchanged for the liberty of Sancho II, who may have participated in and been captured at the battle of Estercuel.
