= Atapuerca =

Atapuerca may refer to:

- Atapuerca, Province of Burgos, the town next to the archaeological site
  - Atapuerca Mountains and the associated archaeological site of Atapuerca, an ancient karstic region of Burgos, Spain, containing the earliest known hominin fossils in Western Europe
    - Archaeological site of Atapuerca
- Battle of Atapuerca, a medieval battle between the Kingdom of Castile and the Kingdom of Navarre
- 27952 Atapuerca, an asteroid discovered in 1997
