= Íñigo López de Mendoza, Lord of Llodio =

Íñigo López de Mendoza
- 4th Lord of Llodio
- Born: 12th Century
- Died: 13th Century

Íñigo López de Mendoza (died after 1203) was a Basque nobleman, 4th Lord of Llodio.

== Life ==
The first to use the toponymic surname Mendoza, Íñigo, was the son of Lope Íñiguez — son of another Íñigo López — and his wife Teresa Jiménez, daughter of Jimeno Íñiguez, Lord of Cameros. His brother Gonzalo López de Mendoza was the first Lord of Mendoza. Íñigo confirmed several donations and transactions by members of the House of Haro. He probably participated in several military campaigns of King Alfonso VIII of Castile in 1199 – 1200, and also confirmed several royal charters in 1202 – 1203.

== Marriage and issue ==
Íñigo married María García by whom he had the following children: (Note: In 1210, the siblings Íñigo, Diego, Milia and María donated properties in Cameno to the Monastery of Santa María de Bujedo de Candepajares in the province of Burgos. Either Inés is also called Maria, or else there was another daughter with this name.)

- Íñigo Íñiguez de Mendoza
- Diego Íñiguez de Mendoza
- Urraca Íñiguez de Mendoza
- Milia Iñiguez de Mendoza wife of Fernán Gutiérrez de Castro.
- Inés Íñiguez de Mendoza, mistress of King Alfonso IX of León, the parents of Urraca Alfonso, wife of Lope Díaz II de Haro, Lord of Biscay. (Note: After the annulment of Alfonso IX of León's marriage with Theresa of Portugal and before his marriage to Berengaria of Castile, the king had an affair with Inés which lasted about two years. Nothing more is known about the life of Inés after their separation.)

== Bibliography ==
- Álvarez Borge, Ignacio (2008). Cambios y Alianzas: La política regia en la frontera del Ebro en el reinado de Alfonso VIII de Castilla (1158-1214) (in Spanish). Madrid: Consejo Superior de Investigaciones Científicas. ISBN 978-84-00-08682-4.
- Calderón Medina, Inés (2011). "Las otras mujeres del rey: El concubinato regio en el reino de León (1157- 1230)". Seminário Medieval 2009–2011 (PDF) (in Spanish). Coordinators:Ferreira, María do Rosário; Laranjinha, Ana Sofia; Ribeiro Miranda, José Carlos. Oporto: Instituto de Filosofía da Faculdade de Letras da Universidade do Porto. pp. 255–289. ISBN 9789898459145.
- Villalba Ruiz de Toledo, F. Javier (1988). El Cardenal Mendoza (1428-1495) (in Spanish). Madrid: Ediciones Rialp. p. 23. ISBN 84-321-2423-0.
