= Salvador González (11th century) =

Castilian nobleman

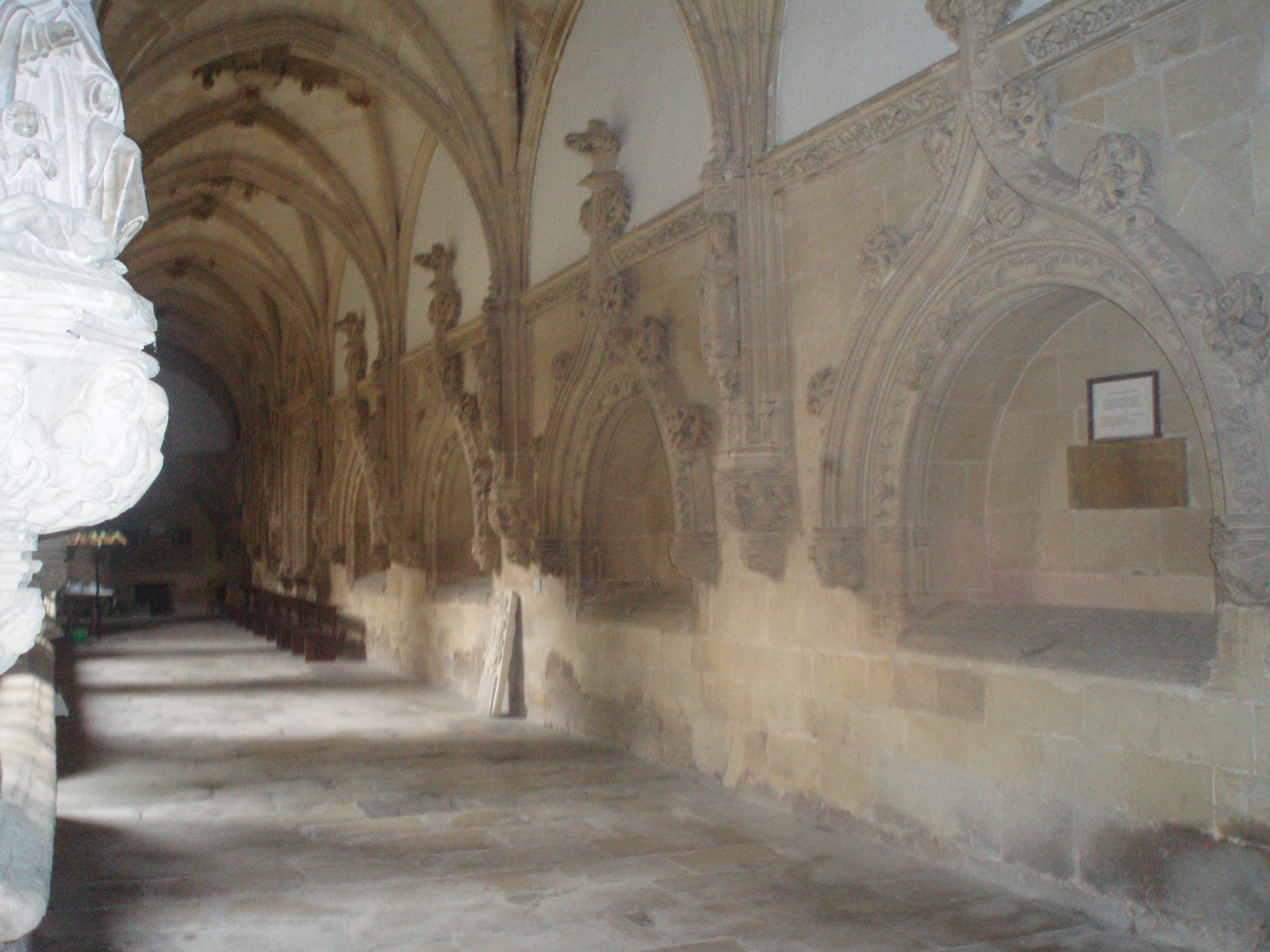
Hall of the Salvadórez tombs in the monastery of Oña

Salvador González (Note: Contemporary spellings of his name vary: Salbator, Salbatore, Salvator, etc. and Gundissalvis, Gundissalbiz, Gondissalvoz, etc.) (died 1067) was a Castilian nobleman active in the regions of La Bureba and Burgos in the middle third of the eleventh century. His origins are obscure, and he thus stands at the head of his lineage, the Salvadórez. He remained loyal to the ruler of Castile throughout his career, even when it meant a loss of position after the Bureba was acquired by neighbouring Pamplona.

== Family ==
Although the name of Salvador's father is indicated by his patronymic (González means "son of Gonzalo"), modern historians disagree on his identity. As a result, Salvador is the earliest known member of his lineage, called by consequence the Salvadórez (or Salvadores). According to Margarita Torres, Gonzalo was probably Gonzalo García, son of Count García Fernández of Castile and Countess Ava of Ribagorza. Gonzalo Martínez Díez regards this descent as impossible. Justo Pérez de Urbel writes that the lineage probably descends from Fernán's second wife, Urraca Garcés. There is some onomastic evidence to support Pérez de Urbel's position. A document dated to 994 is subscribed by one Salvador Pérez, son of Pedro Fernández, a possible son of Fernán González and Urraca Garcés.

The Salvadórez are also thought to be related to the house of Lara, perhaps through Salvador's brother, Count Munio González. Munio's son, Gonzalo Muñoz, is the earliest member of the lineage of the Laras.

Sometime before 1047 (probably before 1042), he was married to Mumadona Álvarez, (Note: This name comes in an array of variations: Momadonna, Muniadona, Munia, etc.) possibly a sister of Nuño Álvarez de Carazo. They had two sons, Gonzalo Salvadórez and Álvaro Salvadórez, named after his father and her father, respectively, and third son, Martín.

== Tenant in the Bureba ==
Salvador appears in the historical record for the first time when he signed as a witness a certain Doña Goto's formal adoption as her heirs of King Sancho Garcés III of Pamplona and his queen, Muniadona, on 1 January 1031. Goto's entire estate consisted of some 38 villas, many in the Bureba. The first charter in which he appears is thus suggestive of Salvador's power and position within the Bureba. He may have held the region as a tenancy on behalf of the crown, as his descendants later would. Doña Goto's adoption took place shortly after the death of the last count of Castile, García Sánchez, in 1028, when King Sancho took over the county and imposed his son Fernando, García's nephew, as count. Salvador and his brother Munio were loyal supporters of King Sancho. In 1033, Salvador and his brother confirmed the king's donation to the monastery of San Salvador de Oña, with which the Salvadórez were to maintain a strong connexion.

After the king's death in 1035, Salvador decided to serve Fernando as count of Castile and, after 1037, as king of León, rather than García Sánchez III, Sancho's heir in Pamplona. Since the Bureba, which historically belonged to Castile, passed to Pamplona after 1035, Salvador's main area activity shifted westwards to the region of Burgos and the monastery of San Pedro de Cardeña. On 1 July 1042, he witnessed a donation by King Fernando to Bishop Gómez of Burgos. He still retained some holdings in the Bureba, however. On 25 May 1040 he was holding the tenancy of Arreba, near Valle de Manzanedo, on behalf of King García, for on that day the king granted Arreba and many other tenancies of the royal demesne to his wife, Stephanie, as her dower.

== Activity around Burgos ==
Gonzalo was a close associate of San Pedro de Cardeña, regularly witnessing charters of their economic transactions. (All these transactions concerned land south of the Sierra de Atapuerca and thus in Castile.) Although he first witnessed a Cardeñan charter on 9 April 1032, he only worked closely with the monastery in the decade between 1047 and 1058. On 1 July 1047, he and his wife drew up a will (series testamenti) in favour of the monastery. On 27 October, he confirmed a donation by his in-laws, Nuño Álvarez and his wife Godo. On 14 April 1048, 14 April 1050 and 14 April 1052, he confirmed some private transactions of Bishop Gómez. On 3 August 1048, his signature "strengthened" (roboravit) a private purchase by Abbot Domingo of Cardeña. His confirmation was also said to "strengthen" Bishop Gómez's purchase of land near Burgos on 13 August 1052. On 15 May 1050, he confirmed the bishop's cession of certain patrimonial estates to Cardeña, and on 31 August, he witnessed the king and Queen Sancha grant two monasteries to Bishop Gómez and Abbot Domingo. On 26 November 1054, one Beila Obecoz made a sale to the bishop and Salvador confirmed. On 6 June 1056, he confirmed a sale to the priest Jimeno.

On 14 November 1058, Nuño Álvarez had a will drawn up, giving property at Buniel and Ibeas, among other places, to Abbot Sisebuto of Cardeña for the sake of his late wife's soul. Salvador confirmed. This was the last Cardeñan charter witnessed by Salvador, although a charter of 1063 makes an oblique reference to Salvador. Thereafter, his sons took on a more prominent role in Castile. On 31 August 1056, Salvador and his son Gonzalo confirmed a donation of Fernando to the monastery of Oña—as Salvador and his brother had done in the case of Fernando's father's donation of 1033. In 1062, they both confirmed a donation to San Millán de la Cogolla.

== Death and burial ==
After the death of King Fernando in 1065, Salvador remained loyal to his successor in Castile, Sancho II, although this meant a continued lack of power in the Bureba. In 1067, Castile acquired the Bureba in a war with Pamplona. Salvador would probably have re-entered his old tenancy had he not died about that time. On 11 December, King Sancho visited Oña, where Salvador was buried, and there annexed the monastery of Tártales to it, giving pride of place among the donations witnesses to Salvador's two sons. His son Gonzalo was also buried there in 1083, as was Gonzalo's son Gómez González (died 1110) and grandson Rodrigo Gómez (died 1146). The tomb of Gonzalo bears a sculpted eagle, the same motif which appears on the tomb of Abbess Trigidia, daughter of Count Sancho García of Castile and further evidence of a close connection between the two lineages.

Salvador was never titled "count", which came to be associated with those noblemen especially close to the royal court; instead, he was usually styled senior (lord, whence señor), the typical style in the Bureba. In documents from Cardeña, he is usually styled domno (lord, whence don).

== Sources ==
- Balparda y las Herrerías, Gregorio de (1933–34). Historia crítica de Vizcaya y de sus Fueros, tomo II, libro III: El primer fuero de Vizcaya, el de los Señores. Bilbao: Imprenta Mayli. OCLC 634212337.
- Escalona Monge, Julio (2004). "Misericordia regia, es decir, negociemos: Alfonso VII y los Lara en la Chronica Adefonsi imperatoris". In Isabel Alfonso Antón; Julio Escalona Monge; Georges Martin (eds.). Lucha política: condena y legitimación en la España medieval. Annexes des Cahiers de Linguistique et de Civilisation Hispaniques Médiévales. Vol. 16. Lyon: ENS Éditions. pp. 101–52. ISBN 2-84788-072-0.
- Estepa Díez, Carlos (2003). Las Behetrías Castellanas. 2 vols. Valladolid: Junta de Castilla y León, Consejería de Cultura y Turismo. ISBN 84-9718-117-4.
- Martínez Díez, Gonzalo (2005). El Condado de Castilla (711–1038): la historia frente a la leyenda. Valladolid. ISBN 84-9718-275-8.
- Martínez Díez, Gonzalo (2007). Sancho III el Mayor Rey de Pamplona, Rex Ibericus (in Spanish). Madrid: Marcial Pons Historia. ISBN 978-84-96467-47-7.
- Sagredo Fernández, Félix (1975). "Los condes de Bureba en la documentación de la segunda mitad del siglo XI". Hispania: Revista española de historia. 35 (extra 6): 91–120.
- Sánchez de Mora, Antonio (1998). "Aproximación al estudio de la nobleza castellana: Los llamados Salvadores-Manzanedo y sus relaciones con el linaje de Lara (ss. XI–XIII)". Medievalismo: Boletín de la Sociedad Española de Estudios Medievales. 8: 35–64.
- Sánchez de Mora, Antonio (2003). La nobleza castellana en la plena Edad Media: el linaje de Lara (2 vols.). Doctoral thesis. Universidad de Sevilla.
- Sánchez Candeira, Alfonso (1999). Montero Tejada, Rosa (ed.). Castilla y León en el siglo XI: estudio del reinado de Fernando I. Madrid: Real Academia de la Historia.
- Senra Gabriel y Galán, José Luis (2011). "Entre la santidad y la epopeya: Rastreando el desaparecido claustro románico del monasterio de San Salvador de Oña". In Rafael Sánchez Domingo (ed.). Oña, un milenio: Actas del Congreso Internacional sobre el Monasterio de Oña (1011–2011). Fundación Milenario San Salvador de Oña. pp. 398–421.
- Torres Sevilla-Quiñones de León, Margarita Cecilia (1999). Linajes nobiliarios de León y Castilla: Siglos IX-XIII. Salamanca: Junta de Castilla y León, Consejería de educación y cultura. ISBN 84-7846-781-5.
