= Fortún Ochoiz =

Navarrese nobleman

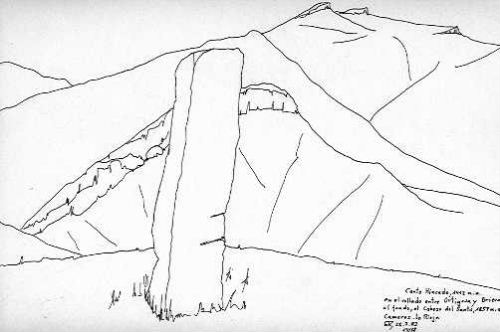
At Peña Hincada there still exists a menhir that is one of the boundary stones that fixed the division between Fortún's lands in Navarre and those of neighbouring Castile in 1016.

Fortún Ochoiz or Fortún Ochoa (floruit 1013–1050) was a Navarrese nobleman, diplomat, and statesman. Throughout his known career he held the tenencia of La Rioja, an important marcher lordship, the rump of the Kingdom of Viguera, and the foundation for the Lordship of Los Cameros. Fortún helped fix the border between southwestern Navarre and the Kingdom of Castile, and he married into the royal family and fought alongside his father-in-law, García Sánchez III in the Reconquista. His ancestors may have belonged to the Banu Qasi, themselves descended from Visigothic nobility, and his descendants continued to rule their patrimony until the twelfth century.

"Ochoiz" is a patronymic derived from the Basque name Ochoa or Oggoa, which meant "wolf" (modern Basque otso) and was probably used interchangeably with the Castilian name Lope (also "wolf", modern Spanish lobo), the patronymic of which is López.

== Early career on the frontier ==
The earliest reference to Fortún is from a list of witnesses to a document of 1013, at which time he was already ruling Viguera. From at least 1015 to around 1024 Fortún was the ruler (dominator) of Meltria (a region today known as Valdemetria). His lordship extended on both sides of the Ebro. The territory comprising Fortún's march was described in the carta de arras of king García (1040) as "[the fortress of] Viguera, both Cameros, Valle de Arnedo and all the villages of Cantabria." "Cantabria" probably refers more specifically to the Cerro de Cantabria, a region north of the Ebro by the mouth of the Iregua, where the city of Logroño is today, rather than to the modern region of Cantabria. Fortún held this region at least from 1032 until 1044. The two Cameros were Viejo Camero and Nuevo Camero and included the valleys of the Iregua and the Leza. The Valle de Arnedo was the valley of the Cidacos.

In 1016 Sancho III of Navarre and Sancho García of Castile established by agreement the border between their respective realms. Sometime later, probably between 1028 and 1054, Fortún Ochoiz and his neighbour across the border in Castile, Nuño Álvarez de Carazo, re-confirmed the division and the frontier. This act, confirming only the border as it passed through the Sierra de la Demanda, is preserved in a short notice in a document from the Becerro Galicano cartulary of the Riojan monastery of San Millán de la Cogolla. It is the only record of the division of 1016, only the surveying for which was perhaps undertaken, the hypothetical treaty never being drawn up or confirmed; otherwise, it is lost. It is also possible that Fortún and Nuño confirmed the old frontier in an act of rebellion, without authority from their respective lords.

Notice and confirmation of the territorial division and boundary-setting between Castile and Navarre, 1016:

De divisione regno inter Pampilona et Castella, sicut ordinaverunt Sancio comite et Sancio regis Pampilonensem, sicut illis visum fuit una concordia et convenientia.
Id est de summa cuculla ad rivo Valle Venarie, ad Gramneto, ibi est molione sito et acollato Monnio, et a Biciercas et a Penna Nigra; deinde ad flumen Razon ubi nascit; deinde per medium monte de Calcanio, per summo lumbo et media Galaza, et ibi molione est sito, et usque ad flumen Tera, ibi est Garrahe antiqua civitate deserta, et ad flumen Duero.
Duenno Nunno Alvaro de Castella et sennor Furtun Oggoiz de Pampilona teste et confirmantes. Era M^{a}. L^{a}. IIII^{a}.

On the division of the realm between Pamplona and Castile, as ordered by Count Sancho and King Sancho of the Pamplonese, in accordance with which idea there was an accord and covenant.

It is this: from the summit of the Cogolla to the river of Valvanera, to Gramedo, where is found the boundary stone, through Viciercas and through Peña Negra as far as the birthplace of the river Razón; there by means of mount Carcaño, through the line of peaks and by way of Gazala, where is found the other boundary stone, as far as the river Tera; there is found Garray, the ancient deserted city, and from there to the river Duero.

Lord Nuño Álvarez of Castile and lord Fortún Ochoiz of Pamplona attest and confirm. Era 1054.

The first paragraph of the treaty is in the preterite, indicating that the fixing of the border occurred in the past (1016), while the confirmation in the document is in the present tense, indicating it took place at a later date (after 1016). The title duenno (later don) was the prevalent form in Castile of the same title for which the Navarrese preferred sennor (later señor), both meant "lord" (from Latin dominus and senior, respectively). The "summit of the Cogolla" is today the Pico de San Lorenzo. The identification of the rivers Razón, Tera, and Duero is facile. Valle Venarie is Valvanera, while Garray is the ancient Numantia.

== Marriage and ascendancy ==
In his early appearances in the surviving documents, Fortún's position is one of lesser importance, but he had risen in rank by the end of the reign of Sancho III (1004–35). He only became one of the leading Navarrese magnates in the second half of the reign of García Sánchez III (1035–54). After his marriage to Mencía (born c. 1030), an illegitimate daughter of the king, Fortún Ochoiz held the third rank in the kingdom after the king himself and Fortún Sánchez. The relative rarity of his appearance in documents before this marriage may reflect his distance from court as the governor of one of the marches.

The marriage to Mencía was either a late marriage for Fortún or a second one. It has been speculated that he had been married to a relative of García Ramírez of Viguera, and that it was in right of her that he succeeded to the territories formerly ruled by García Ramírez. The late marriage to Mencía may have been arranged by the king. In 1049 García Sánchez III conceded to Fortún certain heritable properties, some "already in your power" (hodie sunt in tua potestate), in Nalda, Leza, and Jubera, "because of your good service which you have given me" (propter tuum bonum servitium quod michi fecisti). At this time Fortún and Mencía were already married. Their marriage, perhaps in 1044, may have been responsible for Fortún's return to court that year, which in its turn may have facilitated preparations for the reconquest of Calahorra the next year (1045), by a joint Christian army under García. García's reference to good service is probably a reference to military service, most likely in the Calahorra campaign.

Fortún's disappearance from the record in 1050 may represent a retirement of sorts in light of the straining of the relationship between the bellicose kings of Castile and Navarre. Nuño Álvarez disappears from court in 1047, around the same time, perhaps both returned to their delimited frontier zones, for Fortún was still ruling Viguera after 1047. When he died, he was interred in "a sepulchre of wood with his own effigy" in San Prudencio de Monte Laturce. His wife was later buried beside him.

It has sometimes been assumed that the various lords (seniores) named Fortúnez (Fortunionis) who appear in the lower Rioja during the mid-eleventh century were children of Fortún Ochoiz and his wife Mencía. As a widow she appears beside a list of her children in 1057, when she made a donation to San Prudencio. These five children were: Aznar, who inherited Cantabria; Íñigo, who inherited Arnedo; Sancho, who inherited Huarte; Lope, who inherited Calahorra; and Ximeno, who inherited Cameros and Viguera. Only Aznar is given the patronymic Fortúnez in Mencía's donation. It is possible that only he was a child of Mencía, the others being her stepchildren from an earlier marriage of Fortún's. There are other Fortúnez from Viguera mentioned in contemporary documents (besides those listed beside Mencía), and it is possible that they too are progeny of an earlier marriage or marriages of Fortún Ochoiz.

== Banu Qasi connection ==
It has been speculated, on the basis of onomastics and geography, that Fortún was a relative of the Banu Qasi, a muwallad clan that was once the third power in Spain, and that his position in the Rioja may have derived from this connexion. The Banu Qasi leader Musa ibn Musa, the "third king of Spain" (tercer rey de España), had two sons who were both rulers in the Rioja in the late ninth century: Lubb ibn Musa in Viguer and Arnedo and Fortún ibn Musa in Tudela. Lubb is just the Arabic version of Lope (and thus Ochoa). Both of Fortún Ochoiz's names were current in the last generation of the Banu Qasi then ruling La Rioja.

The Islamic historian al-Udri records that the Banu Qasi became extinct in the 920s, with the loss of the upper Rioja to Navarre. Ibn Hazm records that a certain Fortún, a younger son of Lubb ibn Muhammad, and his cousin, also Fortún, a son of Abd Allah ibn Muhammad, both converted to Christianity. It has been theorised that they retained a certain independence after recognising the sovereignty of the kings of Navarre.

The lords who ruled the northern frontier during the Umayyad Caliphate, like the Banu Qasi, were generally independent of caliphal authority, as evidenced by the heritability of their power. The original power base of Banu Qasi may have been the triangle formed by Ejea, Olite, and Tudela north of the Ebro. Later in the ninth century their power was in Calahorra, Arnedo, and Viguera. The Banu Qasi territory may have been the basis for the late tenth-century kingdom of Viguera, whose territorial extension is poorly known, but which included Leza and probably the Cameros. It remained semi-independent relative to Navarre, just as it had relative to Córdoba in the previous century. The description of Fortún's lands in the carta de arras of king García (1040) gives him an unusually high number of tenencias (five, compared to the usual one or two) and, more unusual still, they were all contiguous, extensive regions rather than isolated strongholds or castles. It appears then that the land controlled by the Banu Qasi in the ninth century, the kingdom of Viguera in the tenth, and Fortún Ochoiz in the eleventh had the same extension. The señorío of the Cameros in the twelfth century may be a fourth historical appearance of this semi-independent network of regional fiefs.

== Table of appearance in documents ==
The following table lists surviving documents in which Fortún appears as a witness or a confirmant. If the date scholars assign the document differs from the date on the document itself, it is mentioned in the notes. The spelling of Fortún's patronymic is also given, as is his relative position in the list of witnesses and/or confirmants which would appear at the end of the document. Generally, a higher place in the list indicates greater importance, though the importance of an individual nobleman could vary depending on the transaction. Where Fortún appears second, it means that he was the first person to sign the document after the king. The archive where the document is preserved (usually a monastery) is also listed; footnotes indicate the published editions at their first appearance. The number is that given to the document in its published edition, for consistent and easy reference.

Date	Title, name, patronymic	Tenencia (fief)	Place in list of confirmants	Number of confirmants	Cartulary	Document number	Notes
1 April 1013	sennor Furtun Ozoiz	dominans Vicarie	4	8	Cogolla	146	
21 October 1015	senior Fortunio Oxoiz/ç	dominador Meldria	10	13	Leire	17	
21 October 1015	senior Fortunio Oxoiz/ç	dominador Meldria	10	13	Leire	18	
1016	sennor Furtun Oggoiz	de Pampilona	1	1	Cogolla	166	De divisione regno, quoted in its entirety above.
21 October 1022	senior Fertunio Ossuac/ç	none	5	7	Leire	20	
1024	senior Fortunio Ossóiz	dominador Meldria	4	5	Leire	22	
6 August 1025	senior Fortun Oggobiz		4	7	Cogolla	179	
13 April 1030	sennor Furtun Oggoitz				Cogolla	192	
1030	Oysgoaz		2	18	Oña	19	Highly dubious.
1030	Oysgoac		2	18	Oña	26	Highly dubious.
22 December 1030	senior Fortun Ossoyç	dominator Cantabrie			Pamplona	4	
1032	senior Fortuino Ossoyç	dominus Cantabrie			Pamplona	6	Document dated to 1007, redated to 1032 by editor.
1032	senior Fortuni Uxuar		3	3	Albelda	33	Charter of repoblación (resettlement) of Villanova de Pampaneto.
26 December 1032	Fortunio Uxuax/z	dominator Cantabriensis	7	8	Leire	23	
1040	Oxoiz		22	35	Rioja	3	Carta de arras of King García.
13 April 1042	senior Fortunio Osxoa	de Kantabria	1	8	Leire	30	
13 April 1042	senior Fortunio Oscoa	de Kantabria	1	8	Leire	31	
1 January 1044	senior Furtuni Uxoaz	Cantabriensis	1	3	Albelda	35	Confirmation of repoblación (resettlement) of Villanova de Pampaneto.
2 November 1044	senior Fortum Oxoa	de Begera	14	24	Rioja	4	
1 October 1045			2	8	Cogolla	237	
1046					Cogolla	243	
1046			2	20–25	Oña*	5	Dated 1043, redated to 1046. Refers to a donation of San Juan de Pancorbo to Oña in that year.
1046	Oxoys		2	20–25	Oña	32	
1046	Uzoiz		2	20–25	Oña	35	Dated 1048, redated to 1046. Refers to a donation of San Juan de Pancorbo to Oña in that year.
18 November 1047	senior Fortum Oxoiz	dominator Bicaria	2	17	Leire	39	
1 November 1048	senior Fortuni Uxoa	dominas Veccaria	2	9	Albelda	36	
1048			2	14	Albelda	37	
1049			2	12	Cogolla	255	
1049	sennor Fortun Oxoriz	dominator Vicaria	2	13	Cogolla	256	
1049			2	14	Cogolla	259	
1049	seniori Fortun Ochoaz				Laturce	2	Donation of King García to Fortún and his wife Mencía.
17 February 1050	Uxoiz		2	11	Cogolla	267	
8 November 1050			2	12	Cogolla	269	
	Uxoriz				Cogolla	260	
	senior Fortunio Ogoiz	dominator Vikera			Albelda	62	Dated 1082, but since it belongs to the reign of García Sánchez III, this is an error.
