= Velasgutto de Ayala =

Belasgytto, Vela el Santo or Velasco was the legendary founder of the house of Ayala. He is said by an Ayala history dating from the fourteenth century to have been son of Sancho Ramirez of Navarre, sent to the marches of Biscay. There he or his son are said to have received the Ayala lands as vassal of king Alfonso VI of Castile. While a descent from the Kings of Aragon is unsupportable and the true origins of the Ayala in the region seem to predate the time of Sancho and Alfonso, it has been speculated that this may reflect a confused memory of feudal links to the similarly named King of Viguera, Sancho Ramírez of Viguera.

The House of Lords in Ayala, supposedly founded by him, produced many prominent and distinguished royal officials of the Spanish/Castilian military class, and renowned figures in the Arts. The best known was Pero Lopez de Ayala.
