= Rodrigo Díaz =

Rodrigo Díaz may refer to:

- Rodrigo Díaz de Vivar, commonly known as El Cid
- Rodrigo Díaz de los Cameros, troubadour
- Rodrigo Díaz (footballer) (born 1981), Argentine footballer
- Rodrigo Díaz (equestrian) (born 1978), Colombian Olympic equestrian
- Rodrigo Díaz (swimmer) (born 1984), Guatemalan swimmer
- Rodrigo Díaz (handballer) (born 1988), Chilean handball player
- Rodrigo Díaz (bishop) (died 1249), Roman Catholic prelate
- Rodrigo Guirao Díaz (born 1980), Argentine actor
- Rodrigo Malmierca Díaz (born 1956), Cuban diplomat and politician
