= San Millán =

San Millán may refer to:

== Places ==
- San Millán de la Cogolla, a village in La Rioja, Spain
- San Millán de Lara, a village in Burgos, Spain
- San Millán de Juarros, a village in Burgos, Spain.
- San Millán de los Caballeros, a village in León, Spain
- Pico San Millán, a mountain in Sierra de la Demanda, highest peak of Burgos.

== Persons ==
- Áurea of San Millán, or Saint Aurea, female saint from 11th century Spain
- Emilian of Cogolla, or San Millán, saint from 5th or 6th century in Spain

== Institutions ==
- Monasteries of San Millán de la Cogolla, the San Millán de Suso and San Millán de Yuso monasteries
