= Dolinasorex =

Dolinasorex Temporal range: 0.78–0.90 Ma

Scientific classification
- Kingdom: Animalia
- Phylum: Chordata
- Class: Mammalia
- Infraclass: Placentalia
- Order: Eulipotyphla
- Family: Soricidae
- Genus: †Dolinasorex; Rofes & Cuence-Bescós, 2008

Type species
- †Dolinasorex glyphodon Rofes & Cuence-Bescós, 2008

Extinct genus of mammals

Dolinasorex glyphodon is an extinct species of giant venomous shrew. Fossilized remains of the animal were found at the Gran Dolina site, in the Sierra de Atapuerca, Burgos, Spain by researchers from the University of Zaragoza, Spain between 1991 and 2007. The deposit is estimated to be between 780,000 and 900,000 years old. D. glyphodon is the only known species in the genus Dolinasorex.

== Description ==
Dolinasorex is known only from craniodental material, including a left mandible with lower teeth, an incomplete skull with upper teeth, and a left lower incisor. While the material presents no unambiguous autapomorphies, a unique combination of characters allows it to be distinguished from other shrew taxa. The skull is noted for its large size and robust construction, and the teeth are stained red; this is common across many shrews, whose teeth are often coated in iron. The snout is robust, and the broad zygomatic process may be indicative of a relatively strong bite force. The animal is noted for its huge size relative to modern shrews; the extant Eurasian water shrew (Neomys fodiens) weighs around 14 grams, whereas Dolinasorex is estimated to have weighed up to 60 grams.

== Classification ==
A phylogenetic analysis performed in the paper describing the taxon found its closest relative to be Lunasorex lii.

- - Soriculus
  - - - Chimarrogale
      - Nectogale elegans
    - - - Asoriculus gibberodon
        - - Nesiotites ponsi
          - Nesiotites hidalgo
      - - Neomysorex alpinoides
        - - - Lunanosorex lii
            - Dolinasorex glyphodon
          - - Beremendia pohaiensis
            - - Beremendia fissidens
              - Beremendia minor

== Paleoecology ==
Rofes & Cuence-Bescós conclude that large-bodied red-toothed shrews like Dolinasorex would not have been able to survive without huge quantities of food, owing to the extremely high metabolic rate of the clade. They postulate that its presence is indicative of a temperate, humid, and relatively stable paleoclimate in levels TD5 and TD6 of the Gran Dolina site. This is consistent with several prior studies on the paleoclimate of Gran Dolina. Additionally, they suggest that the larger size of this taxon would require it to develop a unique venom delivery system to immobilise larger prey, corroborating a 2007 study by Cuenca-Bescós.
