= Salvador González =

Salvador González may refer to:

- Salvador González (11th century) (died 1067), Castilian nobleman
- Salvador González Ramírez (1832–1882), Costa Rican politician, vice president in 1873–1874
- Salvador González Anaya (1879–1955), Spanish novelist and poet, member of the Real Academia Española
- Salvador González Escalona (1948–2021), Cuban painter, muralist and sculptor
- Salvador González Marco (born 1963), Spanish footballer known as Voro (footballer)
- Salvador González Morales (born 1971), Mexican prelate of the Roman Catholic Church
