= Nuño Álvarez de Carazo =

Castilian nobleman

Nuño Álvarez de Carazo (floruit 1028–1054) was a Castilian nobleman, diplomat, and warrior. Throughout his career he maintained important relations with the Kingdom of Navarre, which his lands and lordships bordered.

There were at least three persons named "Nuño Álvarez" in mid eleventh-century Castile. Nuño Álvarez de Carazo appears in sixteen documents between 1033 and 1054 with the honorific duenno or domno and two with the territorial appellation de Carazo. He was the eldest of his brothers and may have been the maternal great uncle of Rodrigo Díaz de Vivar, his brother Rodrigo being the father of Rodrigo Díaz's mother. Since Nuño's brother Diego and sister Mumadona held land at Carazo and Lara de los Infantes, it seems likely that Nuño's lordship in this region was based on familial estates and patrimonial lands. Carazo is not particularly near the border with Navarre, but it is probable that the land between them was sparsely populated. The lowlands near where the river Arlanza entered the Arlanzón were probably part of his lordship, and Nuño possessed properties in Peñalba and Vilviestre del Pinar halfway between Carazo and Navarre. Nuño's importance in the frontier region southeast of Burgos is apparent in the archives of the monasteries of San Pedro de Arlanza and San Pedro de Cardeña. Nuño also had properties in La Bureba, including at Ibeas de Juarros and perhaps at Oca.

In 1016 Sancho III of Navarre and Sancho García of Castile established by agreement the border between their respective realms. Sometime later, probably between 1030 and 1035, Nuño Álvarez and his neighbour across the border in Navarre, Fortún Ochoiz, re-confirmed the division and the frontier. This act, confirming only the border as it passed through the Sierra de la Demanda, is preserved in a short notice in a document from the Becerro Galicano, a cartulary of the monastery of San Millán de la Cogolla. It is the only record of the division of 1016, only the surveying for which was perhaps undertaken, the hypothetical treaty never being drawn up or confirmed. It is also possible that Nuño and Fortún confirmed the old frontier in an act of rebellion, without authority from their respective lords. Nuño had other relations with Navarre after La Bureba, which was part of Castella Vetula (Old Castile), was allotted to Navarre on the division of Sancho III's realm (1035). Four times Nuño visited the court of García Sánchez III of Navarre when it visited Oña, the capital of Castella Vetula and the place of Sancho III's burial. The Navarrese scribes referred to him and the other visiting Castilians the phrase isti sunt castellani ("these are Castilians") and relegated them to the bottom of witness lists. This can be explained by his allegiance to Ferdinand I of Castile, who was often at odds with his brother García.

Nuño probably died fighting alongside his king against the king of Navarre at the Battle of Atapuerca in 1054, where his brother Fortún probably also died.

== Bibliography ==
- Álvarez Borge, I. 1996. Poder y relaciones sociales en Castilla en la Edad Media. Valladolid.
- Chaytor, Henry John. 1933. A History of Aragon and Catalonia. London: Methuen Publishing.
- Escalona Monge, Julio (2004). "Misericordia regia, es decir, negociemos: Alfonso VII y los Lara en la Chronica Adefonsi imperatoris". In Isabel Alfonso Antón; Julio Escalona Monge; Georges Martin (eds.). Lucha política: condena y legitimación en la España medieval. Annexes des Cahiers de Linguistique et de Civilisation Hispaniques Médiévales. Vol. 16. Lyon: ENS Éditions. pp. 101–52. ISBN 2-84788-072-0.
- Martínez Díez, Gonzalo. 1998. "El monasterio de San Millán y sus monasterios filiales: documentación Emilianense y diplomas apócrifos". Brocar: Cuadernos de investigación histórica, 21:7–53.
- Martínez Díez, Gonzalo. 1999. El Cid histórico. Barcelona.
- Martínez Díez, Gonzalo. 2005. El condado de Castilla, 711–1038: La historia frente a la leyenda. 2 vols. Marcial Pons Historia.
- Menéndez Pidal, Ramón. 1969. La España del Cid, vol. 1. Madrid.
- Pastor Díaz de Garayo, Ernesto. 1996. Castilla en el tránsito de la antigüedad al feudalismo. Valladolid.
- Peterson, David. 2005. "De divisione regno: poder magnaticio en la Sierra de la Demanda en el siglo XI". Brocar: Cuadernos de investigación histórica, 29:7–26.
- Reilly, Bernard F. 1989. The Kingdom of León-Castilla under King Alfonso VI, 1065–1109. Princeton: Princeton University Press.
- Sánchez de Mora, A. 2003. "La parentela de los Álvarez: un grupo gentilicio vinculado al territorio situado al sur del río Arlanzón (s. XI)". Silos. Un Milenio. Actas del Congreso Internacional sobre la abadía de Santo Domingo de Silos. Burgos, 441–55.
- Torres Sevilla, M. 2000. El Cid y otros señores de la guerra. León.
