= Fortún Galíndez =

Fortún Galíndez (floruit 924–972) was a powerful nobleman in the Kingdom of Navarre in the tenth century. He is the only recorded Navarrese of that time to bear the title dux (duke). He was entrusted by Sancho I with the newly conquered territory of the Rioja Alta around Nájera. In 924 he held the title senior in Naiera (lord in Nájera); from 942 he was praefectus in Naiera (prefect in Nájera); and from 950 he was titled dux. He appears to have governed the Rioja with quasi-regal authority, part of a Navarrese experiment in creating a new kingdom, which would be the Kingdom of Viguera.

Based on his patronymic, Fortún's father must have been Galindo. From 924 to 943 Fortún used the title senior or sennor (lord, señor). He was with the royal court frequently during this period, witnessing several royal donations. On 28 October 924 Fortún witnessed the transfer of the monastery of San Pedro de Usún to the diocese of Oya, in which charter he is titled "lord of Nájera". On 26 June 933 he witnessed a royal donation of property to the Riojan monastery of San Martín de Albelda. His last appearance with the low rank of sennor is a royal charter for San Millán de la Cogolla. When García Sánchez I and his queen Tarasia made another donation in 946, he did not subscribe with any title. On 22 November 947 he witnessed a donation of García and the queen mother, Tuta, to Albelda, again untitled.

Private charters of the following period sometimes refer to the "reign" of Fortún Galíndez in Nájera. One grant to Albelda is dated to the time while "García Sánchez [was] reigning in Pamplona, [and] Fortún Galíndez in Nájera" (regnante Garsea Sancionis in Pampilona, Fortuni Galindonis in Nagera). On 15 April 958 a certain Muza and his sister Tota made a donation to Albelda while "king García Sánchez [was] reigning in Pamplona, and under him Fortún Galíndez in Néjera" (regnante [...] rex Garcia Sanciz in Pampilona, et sub eius Fortun Galindonis in Nagera).

During the 950s Fortún makes frequent appearances with the ducal title. In one charter of 956 he is even referred to as Fertunius dux et abba ("duke and abbot"), though no other record exists for his holding an abbacy. Fortún was a common name in Navarre at the time, and it is possible that there was more than one Fortún Galíndez, but only one is clearly identifiable in mid-tenth-century Navarre. Duke Fortún (Furtunius dux) was frequently associated with the monastery of San Millán, signing their charters on 2 September 952, in 955, and on 5 September 957. He is specified in two late charters of San Millán, from 971 and 14 July 972 as Fortunio (or Furtunio) Galindonis dux.

On 10 December 970, in one of his last acts, Fortún witnessed a donation to San Millán by the royal family, Sancho II, Ramiro Garcés, now King of Viguera, and Urraca of Castile, Sancho's queen. He was untitled. The last record of Fortún Galíndez (Furtunio Galindonis) is in two charters (13 and 30 November 972) belonging to the monastery of Santa María la Real de Nájera. He probably died shortly after the last charter, at an advanced age.

Sometime after 930 Fortún married the twice-widowed Velasquita Sánchez, daughter of Sancho I.
