= García Ramírez of Viguera =

García

King of Viguera
- Tenure: 1002 - 1005
- Predecessor: Sancho Ramírez
- Successor: Sancho III of Pamplona
- Died: after 1005
- Spouse: Toda
- Issue: Toda Garcés; Fronilla Garcés
- Father: Ramiro Garcés
- Mother: Unknown woman
- Religion: Catholicism

García Ramírez (Basque: Gartzea Ramirez; dead after 1005) was the third and last King of Viguera, from around 1002 until his death after 1005. From 991 he appears in royal charters of his uncle Sancho II, along with his brother Sancho Ramírez. It is unclear if he was acting as co-king or only took control of Viguera at his brother's death, about 1002. Little is known about his reign, other than his marriage to a woman named Toda.

García and Toda had the following children:

- Toda Garcés, known to have been married to Fortún Sánchez, who was tenant-in-chief of several lands, including Nájera. He was milk brother and close friend to Sancho III of Pamplona and later friend of his son García Sánchez III, with whom he died in the Battle of Atapuerca in 1054.
- Fronilla or Fronilde Garcés. In 1054, declaring herself daughter of García Ramírez and Toda, gave away all her lands and belongings to the Monastery of Irache.

== Sources ==
- Cañada Juste, Alberto. "Un milenario navarro: Ramiro Garcés, rey de Viguera", Príncipe de Viana 42 (1982), pp. 21–37.
- Ubieto Arteta, Antonio. "Monarcas navarros olvidados: los reyes de Viguera", Hispania X (1950), pp. 8–25.

Preceded by Sancho Ramírez	King of Viguera circa 1002 – 1005	Succeeded by Sancho Garcés
