= Rodrigo Díaz de los Cameros =

Castilian magnate and one of the earliest Galician-Portuguese troubadours

Rodrigo Díaz de los Cameros (fl. 1212–1221) was a Castilian magnate and one of the earliest Galician-Portuguese troubadours. He was the son of Diego Ximénez of La Rioja, the lord of Cameros, and Guiomar Rodríguez. He attained the highest noble rank (count), like his maternal grandparents, Rodrigo Pérez de Traba (el Velloso) and Fronilde Fernández.

Rodrigo led a column of men at the Battle of Las Navas de Tolosa in 1212. He commanded in the centre, among the forces of Alfonso VIII of Castile, either immediately aft of or flanking the main vanguard under Diego López II de Haro. His troops were mainly from the Asturias, Biscay, and Old Castile. He was third in the hierarchy of command after Diego and Gonzalo Núñez de Lara. Alongside Rodrigo leading his battalion were his brother Alvar Díaz and Juan González.

In 1217, on the death of Henry I of Castile, Rodrigo and a band of eight nobles challenged the right of Berenguela, Henry's elder sister, to succeed, on the basis that she was not his eldest sister (that was Blanche, then queen-consort of France). In 1220–21, Rodrigo and his noble allies were in rebellion against Berenguela's successor, Ferdinand III; they even offered the throne to Blanche's son, the future Louis IX. Rodrigo had mortgaged some properties to the king in exchange for money to finance a Crusade to the Holy Land. He had refused, however, to answer a summons to the curia regis, and had retained his tenencias illegally. Gonzalo Pérez de Lara led a simultaneous rebellion. Before this time the lords of Cameros had appeared as allies of the kings against the House of Lara.

In the course of his rebellion Rodrigo lost most of his castles and tenencias. In December 1221, though they were subjects of the Castilian crown, Rodrigo and Alvar did homage to Sancho VII of Navarre for the castle of Los Fayos on the Moncayo.

Rodrigo's poetic activity is known only from the Tavola Colocciana, which lists three songs of his, none surviving. He is the only Galician-Portuguese poet known to have attended the court of Alfonso VIII. Rodrigo also spent time at the court of Diego López de Haro, who patronised many Occitan troubadours as well as the Castilian minstrel Gonzalo Ruiz de Azagra, all of whom probably influenced Rodrigo, especially Elias Cairel and Guillem Magret. Rodrigo eventually married Diego's daughter Aldonza. He was the father of at least one son, Simón Royz, active in the reign of Alfonso X from at least 1246 to 1277.
