= Ghalib ibn Abd al-Rahman =

Arabic general commander of al-Andalus

Ghālib ibn ʿAbd al-Raḥmān al-Nāṣirī (c. 900 – 10 July 981), called al-Ṣiqlabī, was a military commander in the ʿUmayyad caliphate of Córdoba, serving the caliphs ʿAbd al-Raḥmān III al-Nāṣir, al-Ḥakam II and Hishām II on both land and sea. For his military prowess, he was granted the honorific Dhu ʾl-Sayfayn (Lord of the Two Swords).

Ghālib's rise coincides with the retirement of ʿAbd al-Raḥmān III from active military command following his defeat at the Battle of Simancas in 939. In the 940s, Ghālib consolidated ʿUmayyad control over Toledo and Medinaceli. In the 950s, he led a series of razzias into Christian territory to the north, bringing back booty and prisoners. In 955, he led a punitive naval expedition against the Fāṭimid Caliphate.

Under al-Ḥakam II, who withdrew into the palace, Ghālib became the public face of the caliphate. His departure on campaign and his return to Córdoba were celebrated with pomp and he was regarded by contemporaries as a hero. He continued to lead campaigns north into Christian territory throughout the 960s and 970s. He also led the defence against the Vikings in 971–72. His most important feat, however, was to bring the Idrīsid dynasty in North Africa back under ʿUmayyad control in 973.

In his final year, Ghālib became embroiled in a civil war with his own son-in-law, Ibn Abī ʿĀmir (Almanzor). Forced to ally with his former Christian enemies, Ghālib was defeated and killed in a pitched battle. His death marks the culmination of the rise of Ibn Abī ʿĀmir to a position of supremacy within the caliphate.

== Origins ==
Ghālib was originally a Ṣiqlabī, a slave of eastern European, probably Slavic, origin from a Christian family. He was owned, and later freed, by ʿAbd al-Raḥmān III, becoming a mawlā (freedman) and, as per custom, taking his former owner's name as his patronymic surname, becoming ibn ʿAbd al-Raḥmān al-Nāṣirī.

Although many slaves destined for the palace or for provincial administration were castrated, Ghālib was not.

== Middle March ==
The Caliphate of Córdoba around the time of Ghālib's death, showing aṯ-Ṯaḡr al-Awsaṭ (the Middle March) and Medinaceli (Madīnat Sālim).

In 946, Ghālib was placed in charge of the Middle March. In this capacity, according to al-Maqqarī, a late source, he rebuilt the castle of Medinaceli (Madīnat Sālim) and used it as a base to harass the Christian kingdom of León. In 953, he attacked the Leonese county of Castile, bringing back many prisoners and much booty, but the border remained unchanged.

In 954, a Sicilian fleet under the orders of the Fāṭimid caliph al-Muʿizz sacked the ʿUmayyad city of Almería. The next year (955), Ghālib led a punitive naval raid on the coast of Fāṭimid Ifrīqiya (Africa). This expedition failed, but in 956 a second expedition with seventy ships captured and razed Marsā al-Kharaz and plundered Ṭabarqa and Sūsa.

In 960, ʿAbd al-Raḥmān III restored the deposed Sancho I to the Leonese throne in exchange for ten border fortresses. This condition had not been fulfilled when the caliph died in October 961. Sancho's rival, Ordoño IV, had fled to the Count Fernán González of Castile, who, in obedience to the treaty between his sovereign, now Sancho, and the caliphate, sent him as a prisoner to Ghālib at Medinaceli, who passed him along to Córdoba. There he was interviewed by the new caliph, al-Ḥakam II, in April 962 and agreed to uphold Sancho's deal if the caliph would restore him to the throne. Before this new agreement could be put into effect, Sancho I renewed his promise to hand over the ten fortresses. Following the death of Ordoño IV shortly after, Sancho reneged. He then allied with the Kingdom of Navarre and the County of Barcelona to attack the caliphate. Al-Ḥakam II then personally led an army to the border in the summer of 963, seizing the fortresses of Gormaz and Atienza while Ghālib and Yaḥyā ibn Muḥammad al-Tujībī, the governor of Zaragoza, led a two-pronged attack on Navarre. Ghālib captured Calahorra from the Navarrese and al-Tujībī defeated their king, García Sánchez I, in battle.

== Supreme commander ==
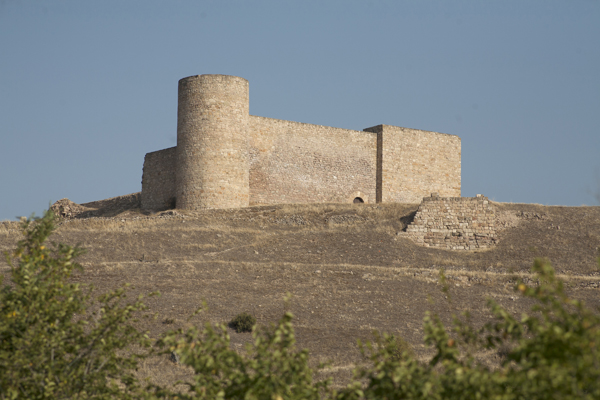
The remains of the castle of Medinaceli today.

By 971, Ghālib held the rank of vizier (wazīr). On 3 July that year, he was summoned by the Caliph al-Ḥakam and put in charge of mounting a campaign by land and sea against a Viking fleet that had appeared off the Atlantic coast. After making preparations, Ghālib departed on 12 July through the Madīnat al-Zahrā (Eastern Gate) in an elaborate ceremony. He was apparently too late. An Leonese embassy arrived from Astorga with news that the Vikings had gone up the river Duero as far as Santaver (Shantabarīya), although they had left empty-handed. Ghālib's fleet did not sail from Almería until the end of Ramadān, around 25 July. The fleet failed to make contact with the Vikings and returned to port a month later. A triumph was staged for Ghālib nonetheless. He was escorted into Córdoba with banners all the way to the Alcázar, and a panegyric was composed in his honour. He did not, however, command the response to the Vikings the following year.

In 972, Ghālib was promoted to the new rank of al-qāʾid al-aʿlā (supreme commander). In 974, diplomas of authority (sijilāt) were issued to the lords of the Middle March upon Ghālib's request. In them, Ghālib is described as the zaʿīm (boss) of the marcher lords. He was thus at the peak of his power and influence when in 973 he was sent to Africa to bring the Idrīsids back under ʿUmayyad control. They had defected under pressure to the Fāṭimids in 958. He returned to Córdoba in triumph with the deposed Idrīsid leader, al-Ḥasan ibn Gannūn, as his captive in September 974. The Idrīsid ruler was forced to swear allegiance to the ʿUmayyads and to the Mālikī madhab (as opposed to the Shiism of the Fāṭimids).

In 975, Ghālib led an expedition against the alliance of León and Navarre. He won two major victories, defeating the allied force under Ramiro III of León that was besieging Gormaz on 28 June and then defeating Count García Fernández of Castile south of the Duero, near Langa, on 8 July. After these victories he was given two gilded swords and the honorific Dhu ʾl-Sayfayn (Lord of the Two Swords), a title which had also been granted by the ʿAbbāsid regent al-Muwaffaq in Baghdad to his general Isḥāq ibn Kundāj in 883. Only al-Ḥakam himself, his son Hishām and his first minister, Jaʿfar ibn ʿUthmān al-Muṣḥafi, were present at the ceremony where Ghālib received the honour. Establishing his headquarters at Medinaceli, Ghālib brought Ibn Abī ʿĀmir, the future ruler of Córdoba, into his employ as his intendant general and was followed by many others drawn by word of his latest honour.

== Conflict with Ibn Abī ʿĀmir ==
After the accession of Hishām II in October 976, Ghālib took command of the military forces of the capital and Ibn Abī ʿĀmir followed him there. In 978, the latter married Ghālib's daughter, Asmāʾ. In the capital, Ibn Abī ʿĀmir plotted with al-Muṣḥafi, to overthrow the palace Ṣaqāliba, and then plotted with Ghālib to overthrow al-Muṣḥafi. Ibn Abī ʿĀmir rewarded his father-in-law's cooperation by procuring for him the honorific dhu ʾl-wizāratayn ("he of the two vizierates") from the young Hishām II. This title placed Ghālib in a position of preeminence over all the other viziers at court.

Son-in-law and father-in-law soon had a falling-out over Ibn Abī ʿĀmir's restricting the caliph's sphere of activity to religious ceremonies. In 980, Ghālib requested a meeting with Ibn Abī ʿĀmir at his castle of Medinaceli. According to the Arabic chroniclers, during the meeting Ghālib in anger struck his son-in-law with his sword, injuring him.

With the conflict now in the open, Ibn Abī ʿĀmir seized Medinaceli at the head of a large Berber army. In order to recover his fiefdom, Ghālib allied with Castile and the Kingdom of Viguera and fought a series of victorious engagements with his son-in-law's forces before the latter forced him into a pitched battle. Although his own army contained Christian mercenaries, Ibn Abī ʿĀmir declared a jihād against Ghālib because of his Christian allies. The battle of Torrevicente took place on 10 July 981. The king of Viguera, Ramiro Garcés, who was the king of Navarre's brother, was killed in action. Ghālib himself died when his horse stumbled and his chest was pierced on his saddlebow. He was about eighty years old. It was for this victory over his last internal rival that Ibn Abī ʿĀmir was given the honorific al-Manṣūr bi-Llāh (Victorious by God) by which is most commonly known.

By order of Ibn Abī ʿĀmir, Ghālib's body was skinned and his skin stuffed and exhibited on a crucifix in Córdoba. His head is given different but equally grisly treatments by different chroniclers.

== Sources ==
- Catlos, Brian A. (2014). Infidel Kings and Unholy Warriors: Faith, Power, and Violence in the Age of Crusade and Jihad. New York: Farrar, Straus and Giroux.
- Catlos, Brian A. (2018). Kingdoms of Faith: A New History of Islamic Spain. London: Hurst and Company.
- Christys, Ann (2015). Vikings in the South: Voyages to Iberia and the Mediterranean. Bloomsbury.
- Collins, Roger (2012). Caliphs and Kings: Spain, 796–1031. Wiley-Blackwell.
- Huici Miranda, Ambrosio (1965). "Ghālib b. ʿAbd al-Raḥmān". In Lewis, B.; Pellat, Ch. & Schacht, J. (eds.). The Encyclopaedia of Islam, Second Edition. Volume II: C–G. Leiden: E. J. Brill. pp. 997–998. doi:10.1163/1573-3912_islam_SIM_2449. OCLC 495469475.
- Kennedy, Hugh (1996). Muslim Spain and Portugal: A Political History of al-Andalus. London and New York: Routledge.
- Makki, Mahmoud (1994). "The Political History of al-Andalus (92/711–897/1492)". In Salma Khadra Jayyusi (ed.). The Legacy of Muslim Spain. Leiden: E. J. Brill. pp. 3–87.
- Meouak, Mohamed (1990). "La biographie de Gālib, haut fonctionnaire andalou de l'époque califale: carrière politique et titres honorifiques". Al-Qantara. 11 (1): 95–112.
- Pick, Lucy K. (2002). "Dominissima, prudentissima: Elvira, First Queen-Regent of León". In T. E. Burman; M. D. Meyerson; L. Shopkow (eds.). Religion, Text, and Society in Medieval Spain and Northern Europe: Essays in Honor of J. N. Hillgarth. Toronto: Pontifical Institute of Mediaeval Studies. pp. 38–69.
