= Lordship of Cameros =

Feudal tenure

The Lordship of Cameros (or Los Cameros) was a frontier lordship in the Sierra de Cameros in the province of La Rioja during the Middle Ages and the early modern period. It was originally part of the southern border of Navarre, comprising much of the territory that had been the Kingdom of Viguera in the first quarter of the eleventh century. It passed to Castile after 1076.

In the twelfth century, the lords of Cameros patronised the monastery of San Prudencio de Monte Laturce, where they were also buried. In 1162, Pedro and Diego Jiménez founded the Cistercian daughter house of Santa María de Rute. In 1181, they relocated it to Monte Laturce to "refound" the old monastery there on Cistercian lines.

== Lords of Cameros ==
- Fortún Ochoiz (1007–54)
- Jimeno Fortúnez (1054–57)
- Lope Fortúnez (1045–57)
- Sancho Fortúnez (1057–64)
- Jimeno Fortúnez (1064–1102)
- Íñigo Jiménez (1102–20) — sometimes regarded as the first lord of Cameros
- Jimeno Íñiguez (1120–47)
- Pedro Jiménez (1155–67, d. 1175)
- Diego Jiménez (1170–82, d. 1188)
- Rodrigo Díaz (1214–19, d. 1220)
- Simón Ruiz (d. 1277)

With the death of Simón, the lordship of Cameros passed to the crown.

== Bibliography ==
- Álvarez Borge, Ignacio (2008). Cambios y alianzas: La política regia en la frontera del Ebro en el reinado de Alfonso VIII de Castilla (1158–1214). Madrid: Consejo Superior de Investigaciones Científicas.
- Diago Hernando, Máximo (1994). "Los Haro de Cameros en los siglos XIII y XIV: Análisis del proceso de su afianzamiento político en el ámbito regional". Anuario de Estudios Medievales. 24: 775–809. doi:10.3989/aem.1994.v24.1000. hdl:10261/23075. S2CID 161824136.
- Canal Sánchez-Pagín, José María (1995). "La casa de Cameros en Castilla y León durante el siglo XII". Archivos Leoneses. 97–98: 147–58.
- González Crespo, Esther (1982). "Los Arellano y el señorío de Los Cameros en la Baja Edad Media". En la España Medieval. 2: 395–410.
- Granado Hijelmo, Ignacio; Fernández de la Pradilla y Mayoral, María Concepción; García Aser, Rosario; Gallo León, Francisco José; Lafuente Urién, Aránzazu, eds. (1999). El Señorío de los Cameros: introducción histórica e inventario analítico de su archivo. Logroño.
- Lafuente Urién, Aránzazu (1999). El Señorío de Los Cameros: introducción histórica e inventario analítico de su archivo. Instituto de Estudios Riojanos.
- Moreno Ramírez de Arellano, Miguel A. (1988). "La quiebra de la casa de Arellano en el contexto de la crisis señorial castellana de finales del siglo XVI: Análisis de las causas determinantes del concurso de acreedores recaído sobre el Señorío de Cameros y Condado de Aguilar en 1592". Berceo. 114: 155–70.
- Moreno Ramírez de Arellano, Miguel A. (1992). Señorío de Cameros y Condado de Aguilar: cuatro siglos de régimen señorial en La Rioja, 1366–1733. Instituto de Estudios Riojanos.
- Olcoz Yanguas, Serafín (2010). "Fortún Ochoaz, las tenencias pamplonesas de Viguera, Cantabria, Meltria y el mítico origen del señorío de Cameros". Berceo. 158: 97–158.
- Pescador Medrano, Aitor (1999). "Tenentes y tenencias del Reino de Pamplona en Álava, Vizcaya, Guipúzcoa, La Rioja y Castilla (1004–1076)" (PDF). Vasconia: Cuadernos de historia-geografía. 29: 107–44.
