= Atapuerca Mountains =

Mountain range in northern Spain

- Sierra de Atapuerca (Spanish)
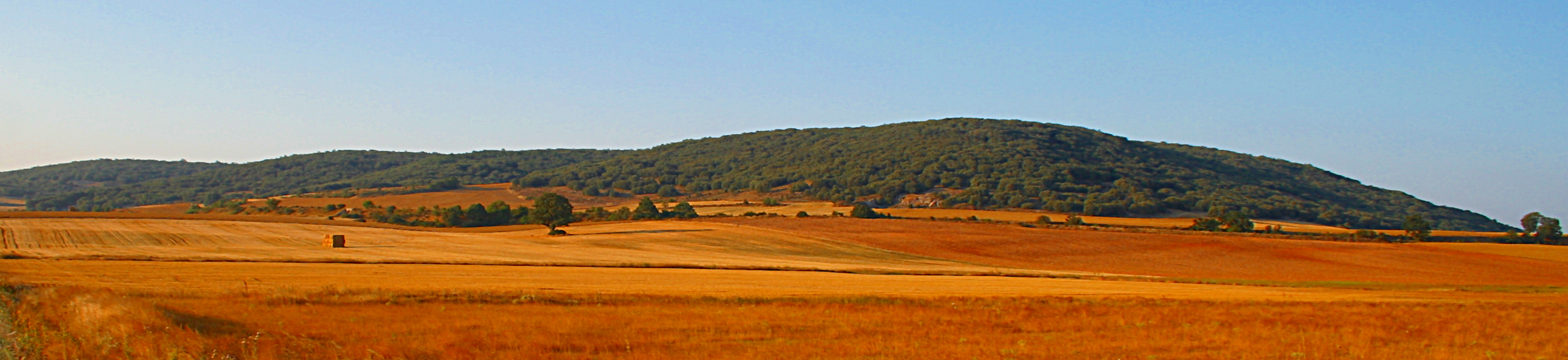
- Atapuerca Mountains panorama

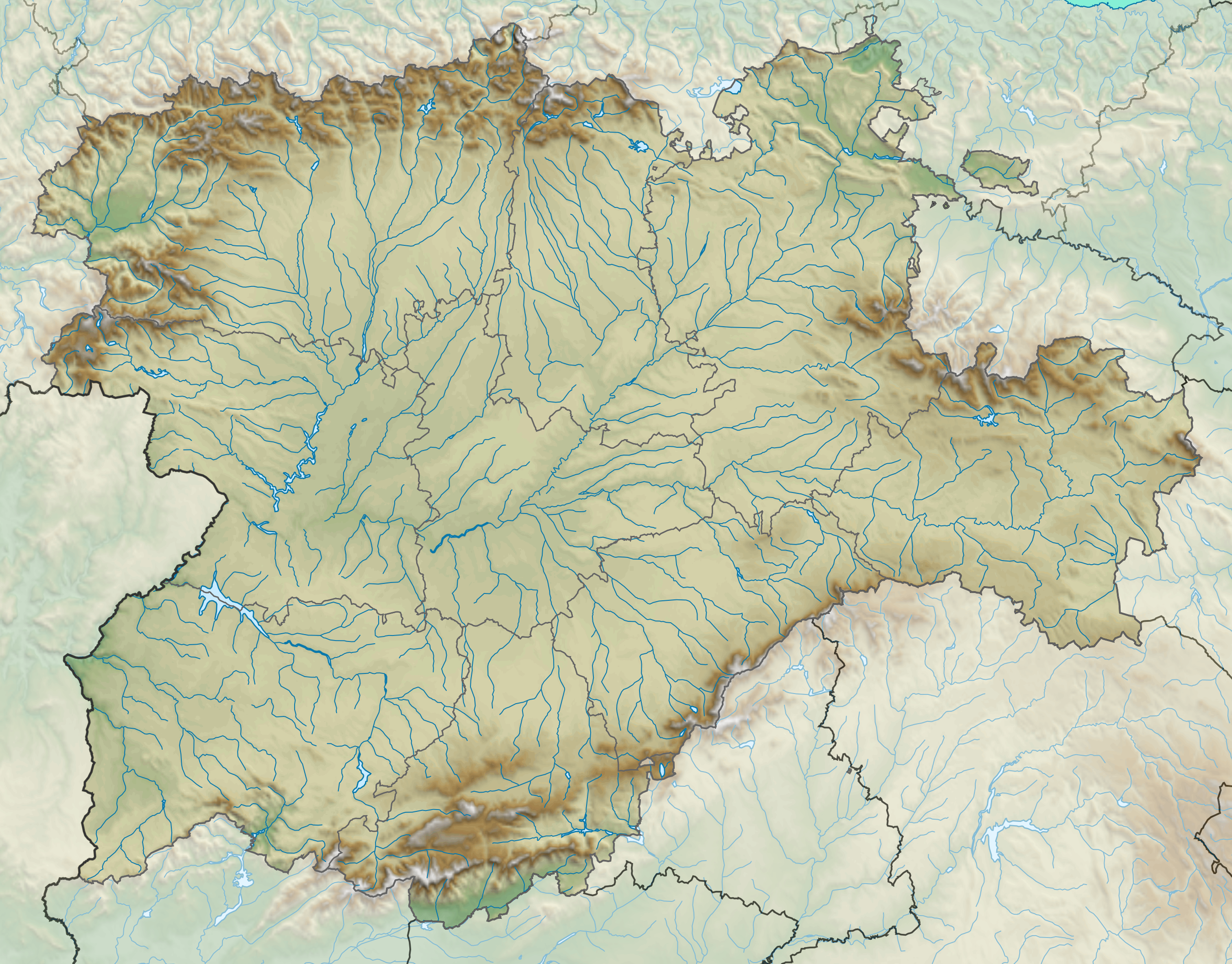
- Location in Spain Atapuerca Mountains (Castile and León) Atapuerca Mountains (Spain)
- 42°22′0″N 3°31′20″W
- Periods: Paleolithic
- Associated with: Homo antecessor, Homo heidelbergensis, Homo neanderthalensis
- Location: near Atapuerca, Ibeas de Juarros
- Region: Burgos, Castile and León

Site notes
- Excavation dates: since 1964
- Archaeologists: Francisco Jordá Cerdá
- Website: http://www.atapuerca.org/

UNESCO World Heritage Site
- Official name: Archaeological Site of Atapuerca
- Criteria: Cultural: (iii)(v)
- Reference: 989
- Inscription: 2000 (24th Session)
- Area: 284.119 ha (702.07 acres)

The Atapuerca Mountains (Spanish: Sierra de Atapuerca) is a karstic hill formation near the village of Atapuerca in the province of Burgos (autonomous community of Castile and Leon), northern Spain.

In a still ongoing excavation campaign, rich fossil deposits and stone tool assemblages have been discovered which are attributed to the earliest known hominin residents in Western Europe. This "exceptional reserve of data" has been deposited during extensive Lower Paleolithic presence, as the Atapuerca Mountains served as the preferred occupation site of Homo erectus, Homo antecessor, Homo heidelbergensis and Homo neanderthalensis communities. The earliest specimen so far unearthed and reliably dated confirm an age between 1.2 million and 630,000 years. Some finds are exhibited in the nearby Museum of Human Evolution, in Burgos.

== Regional geography ==
Encompassing 284,119 hectares (702,070 acres), the Atapuerca Mountains are a mid-altitude karstic range of small foothills around 1,080 m (3,540 ft) above sea level. They are located at the north-east corner of the Douro basin, to the south of the Cantabrian Mountains that run across northern Spain, and stretch alongside the Bureba corridor, a mountain pass that connects the Ebro river valley with the Mediterranean Sea and the Duero basin. This conjunction constitutes an ecotone, which is rich in species of both ecosystems. The mountain pass was part of a causeway built by the Romans, as well as part of the pilgrimage route of Saint James; it is now traversed by the N-1 road and AP-1 highways. The mountains are strategically located between two major drainage divides and near the mountain pass; this location is assumed to have been a factor in the area's successful and prolonged hominid habitation.

== Fauna ==
In 2008 scholars identified a new genus and species of red-toothed shrew from the Pleistocene layers of the Gran Dolina cave. Until this discovery, researchers had believed that the fossils found in this area were of the Beremendia fissidens type, but recent research has been published to support an Asiatic type called Dolinasorex glyphodon that might be endemic and is the earliest known type of soricid in the Iberian peninsula.

== Archaeological site ==
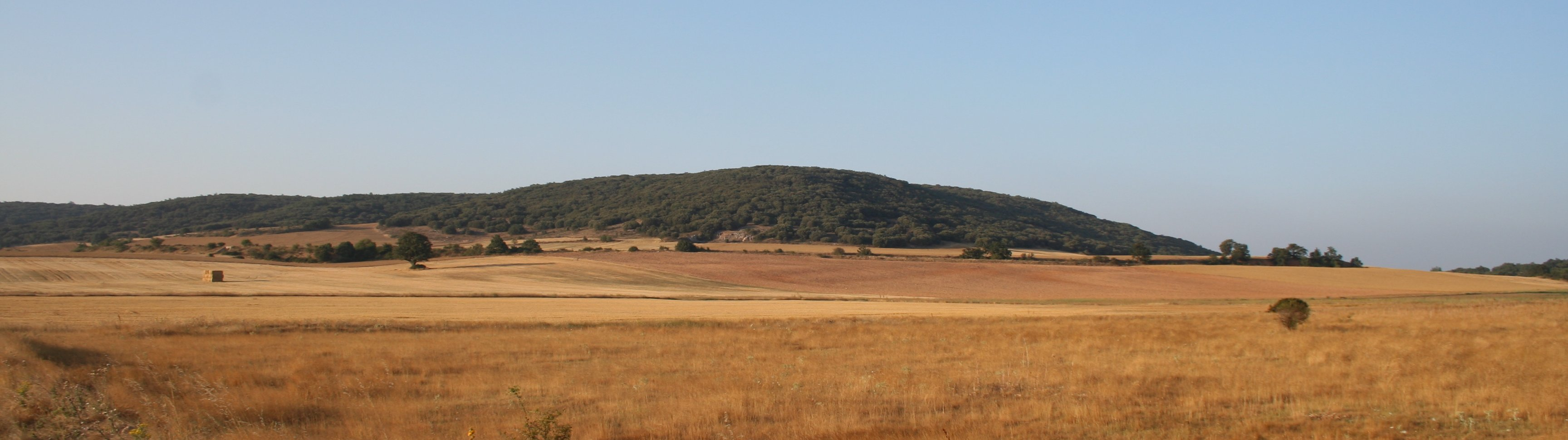
Panoramic view of the archaeological site of Atapuerca, which was designated a UNESCO World Heritage Site in 2000.

== Recorded history ==
Piedrahita ("standing stone") in the Atapuerca valley is according to records site of the Battle of Atapuerca, which took place in 1054 between the forces of Ferdinand I of Castile and his brother García V of Navarre.

== Economic and demographic development ==
Apart from the typical dryland farming of the region, the municipality has grown significantly in economic, demographic and social level with the impact generated by the presence of the archaeological site and its associated services. 15% of the active population owns a job related to tourism. This "tertiarization" of their economy has reversed depopulation by growing and rejuvenating it (with the average age at 42 years).

== Gallery ==
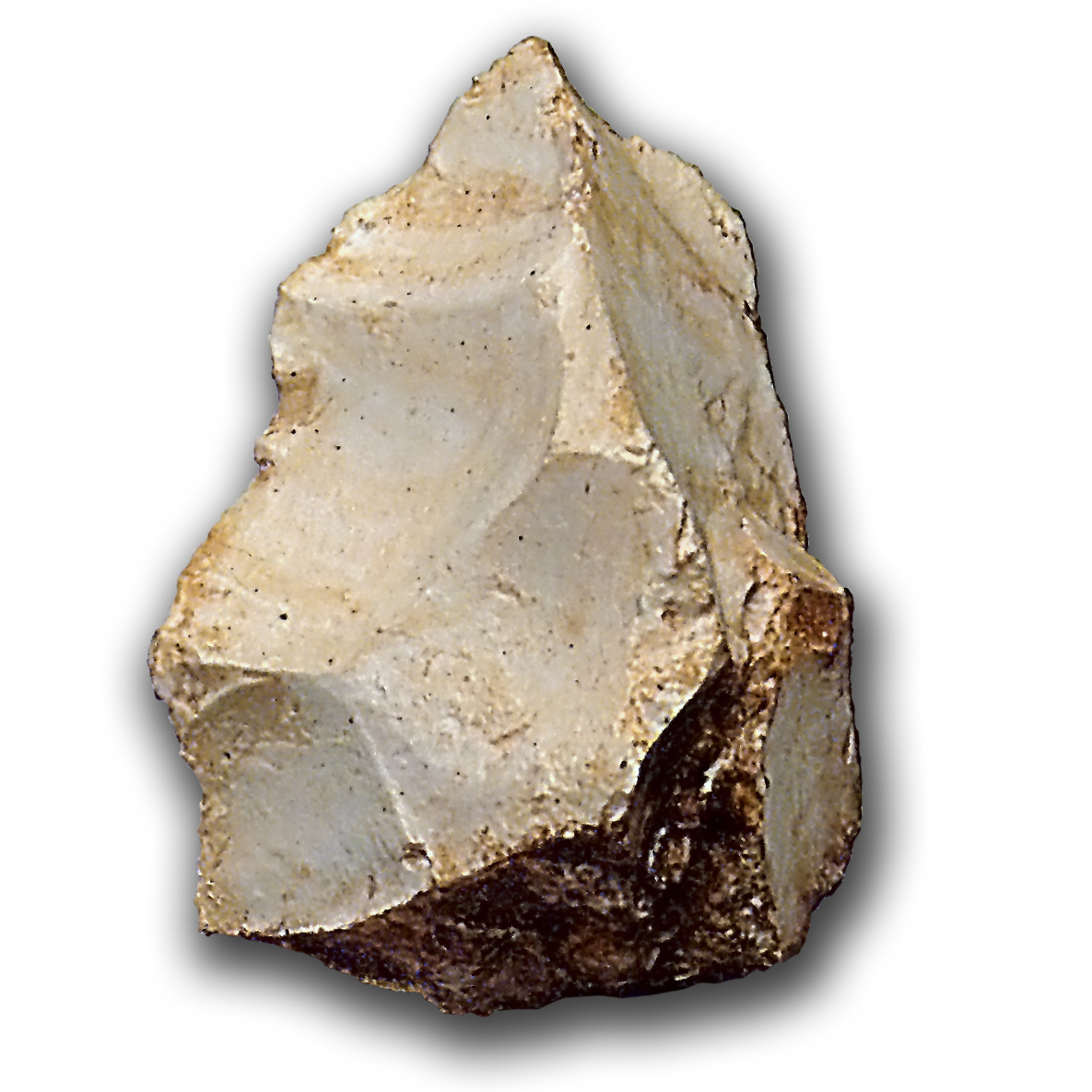
Lithic core in flint, section TD-11 of "Galería", Atapuerca

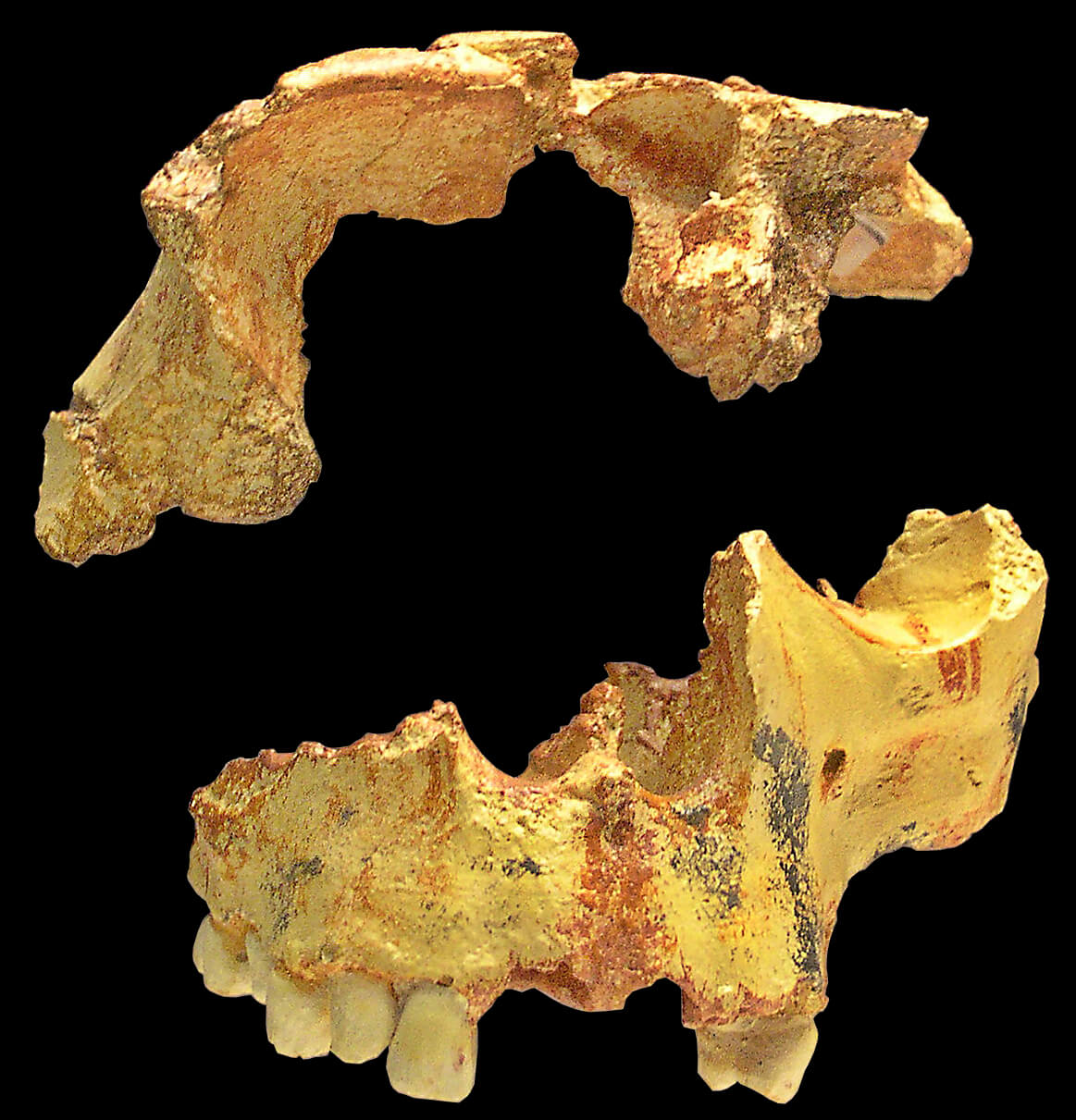
Homo antecessor, incomplete skull found in "Gran Dolina", Atapuerca

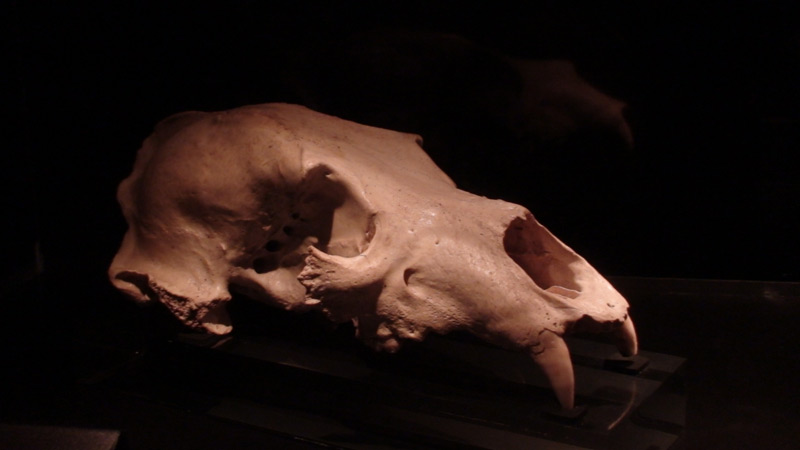
Carnivore skull

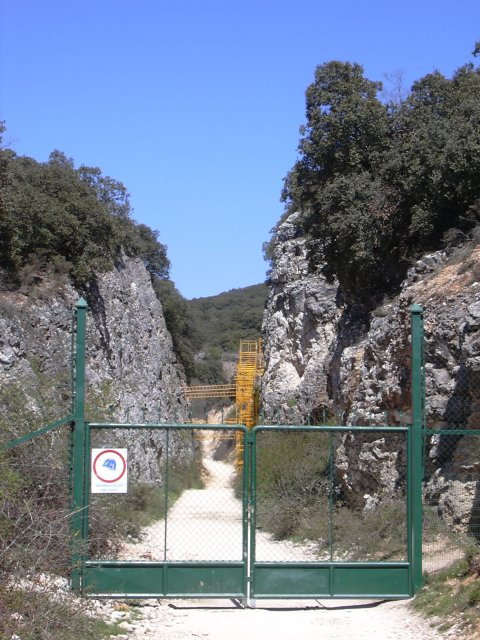
The railroad trench in which the first discoveries were made

== See also ==
- Devil's Tower (Gibraltar)
- Forbes' Quarry
- List of fossil sites (with link directory)
- List of human evolution fossils
- Orce
- Pierolapithecus
- Sidrón Cave
- Sima de las Palomas
