= Sancho Ramírez of Viguera =

Sancho

King of Viguera
- Reign: 981 – 1002
- Predecessor: Ramiro Garcés
- Successor: García Ramírez
- Died: c. 1002
- Father: Ramiro Garcés
- Mother: Unknown woman
- Religion: Catholicism

Sancho Ramírez (Basque: Antso Ramirez; dead c. 1002) was the second King of Viguera, from 981 until his death c. 1002. He was the eldest son of Ramiro Garcés, the first king of Viguera, and also grandson of García Sánchez I of Pamplona.

Little is known about his reign in Viguera. Following the death of his father, he appears in documents with his uncle Sancho II Garcés and his brother García Ramírez. His death is commonly put around 999, but a recently published document shows him still living in 1002. In that year, between the last appearance of García Sánchez II of Pamplona in 1000 and the first appearance of Sancho III of Navarre in 1004, he appears as king in a context that suggests a greater domain than simply Viguera. It has been used to suggest that Sancho Ramírez served briefly as ruler of Pamplona itself in the same manner that Jimeno Garcés of Pamplona had ruled during the youth of García Sánchez I. This 1002 document is the last in which he is found, and he is presumed to have died shortly thereafter.

A woman named Sancha Sánchez appears in Pamplona royal charters in a position of importance, and has been speculated to be his daughter, but her fate is unknown. He was succeeded in the throne by his brother García Ramírez.

== Sources ==
- Cañada Juste, Alberto. "Un milenario navarro: Ramiro Garcés, rey de Viguera", Princípe de Viana 42 (1982), pp. 21–37.
- Cañada Juste, Alberto. "Un posible interregno en la monarquía pamplonesa (1000-1004)", Princípe de Viana, Anejo 8 (1988), pp. 15–18.
- Cañada Juste, Alberto. "Lucubraciones en torno a un documento milenario", Princípe de Viana 63 (2002), pp. 339–344.
- Ubieto Arteta, Antonio. "Monarcas navarros olvidados: los reyes de Viguera", Hispania X (1950), pp. 8–25.

Preceded by Ramiro Garcés	King of Viguera by 991 – circa 1002	Succeeded by García Ramírez
