= Ramiro Garcés of Viguera =

Ramiro
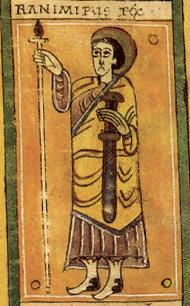
- Image of Ramiro from the Codex Vigilanus.

King of Viguera
- Tenure: 970 – 981
- Successor: Sancho Ramírez
- Died: 9 July 981
- Spouse: Unknown
- Issue: Sancho Ramírez, King of Viguera (981–1002); García Ramírez, King of Viguera (1002)
- Father: García Sánchez I of Pamplona
- Mother: Teresa Ramírez
- Religion: Catholicism

Ramiro Garcés (Basque: Ramiro Gartzia; died 9 July 981) was the first King of Viguera, since the establishment of the kingdom in 970 until his death in 981. He was the eldest son of García Sánchez I of Pamplona with his second wife, Teresa Ramírez of León. It is suggested that while Teresa pushed for the disinheritance of García's eldest son Sancho II of Pamplona in favour of Ramiro, García compromised and willed the region of Viguera to Ramiro with the title of king.

Ramiro was a subregulus and vassal of his brother. In 975 he tried to raid neighbouring Muslim territory, but was defeated in the Battle of Estercuel on 6 July.

The precise date of his death is not recorded. A surviving document dated 981 reports that he had already died. Arabic sources report that he died in the Battle of Torrevicente in 981, where he and García Fernández of Castile fought Almanzur in support of Cordoban rebel Galib. He had two known children, Sancho and García, who succeeded him in turn.

== Sources ==
- Bishko, Charles Julian (October 1948). "Salvus of Albelda and Frontier Monasticism in Tenth-Century Navarre". Speculum. 23 (4): 559–590. doi:10.2307/2850443. JSTOR 2850443.
- Cañada Juste, Alberto (1982). "Un milenario navarro: Ramiro Garcés, rey de Viguera". Príncipe de Viana. 42: 21–37.
- Ubieto Arteta, Antonio (1950). "Monarcas navarros olvidados: los reyes de Viguera". Hispania. X: 8–25.

Preceded by New creation	King of Viguera; 970 – before 991	Succeeded by Sancho Ramírez
