= Fortún Sánchez =

Navarrese nobleman

Fortún Sánchez (c. 992 – 1 September 1054), called Bono Patre ("the godfather"), was a Navarrese nobleman and courtier (curialis). He had the same wet nurse as King Sancho Garcés III, and was a regular presence at his court from the start of his majority in 1011 until his death in 1035. He frequently signed first among the lords (seniores) of the realm, and occasionally before the king's sons (infantes) as well. He acted as aitona or tutor to the future García Sánchez III, and remained at his side throughout his reign, dying with him in the Battle of Atapuerca.

On 21 April 1030, Fortún was present at Sancho's court in Leyre, on the rare occasion of a dual visit of Duke Sancho VI of Gascony and Count Berengar Raymond I of Barcelona. In 1035 Sancho III granted Fortún rule over the tenencia (fief) of Nájera, where his brother Íñigo (Énneco) Sánchez had governed in 1011–20. The tenente of Nájera in 1024–25, a certain Aznar Sánchez, may have also been a brother; he ruled Grañón, in the County of Castile, in 1031. Fortún ruled in Nájera throughout García III's reign. Two charters of García for the monastery of Santa María de Valbanera are dated to not only his rule but Fortún's also, as Fortún's fief lay on the river Valbanera that divided the old reino de Nájera from Castile: "King García reigning in Pamplona and in Oca; and under his [rule] Lord Fortún Sánchez ruling in Nájera."

== Bibliography ==
- Martínez Díez, Gonzalo. 2007. Sancho III el Mayor: Rey de Pamplona, Rex Ibericus. Madrid: Marcial Pons Historia.
