= Murillo el Fruto =

Human settlement in Navarre, Spain

Coordinates: 42°23′N 1°28′W

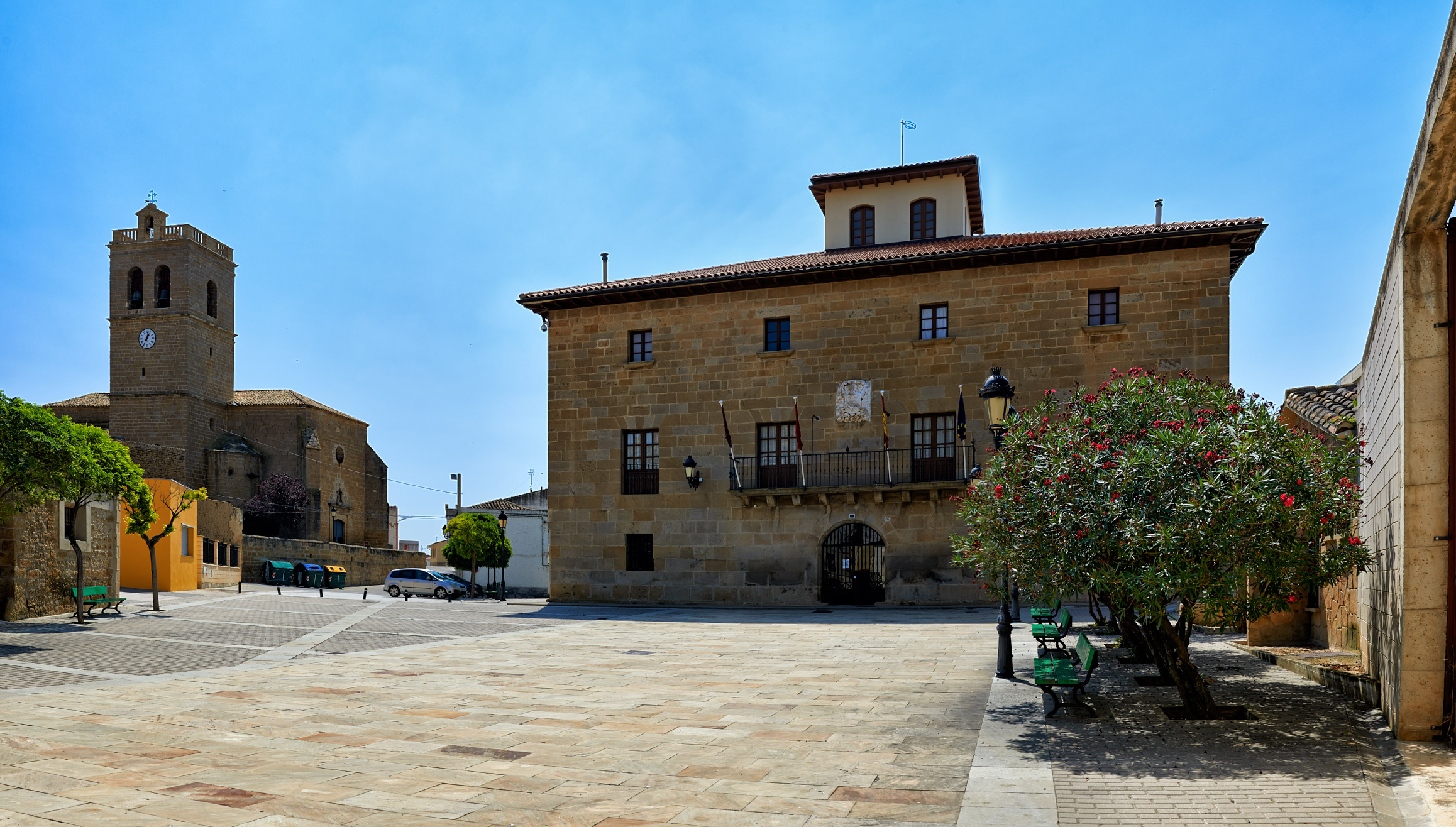

Murillo el Fruto is a town and municipality located in the province and autonomous community of Navarre, northern Spain.
