= Beremendia =

Beremendia Temporal range: Early Pliocene–Middle Pleistocene

Scientific classification
- Kingdom: Animalia
- Phylum: Chordata
- Class: Mammalia
- Order: Eulipotyphla
- Family: Soricidae
- Genus: †Beremendia
- Species: †B. fissidens

Binomial name
- †Beremendia fissidens Petényi, 1864

Extinct genus of beremendiin soricid

Beremendia is an extinct monotypic genus of beremendiin soricid that lived in Europe during the Pliocene and Pleistocene epochs, from the Zanclean to the Chibanian stages.

== Description ==
The I^{1} of Beremendia fissidens possessed a small mediocone located on the mesial side of the anterocone.

== Palaeobiology ==
=== Diet ===
The possession by B. fissidens of grooved lower incisors for venom injection and its large overall body size have been suggested to have indicated that it fed on large prey. However, others suggest that its masseter was too small and too weak to pierce the skin of large-bodied prey. Furthermore, the species lacked the sharp-pointed apices of the maxillary incisors that would be needed to grip big prey. As such, it has been argued it was instead specialised for hunting gastropods and coleopterans, with its venom inducing a comatose-like state in its prey that would have preserved it longer for storage.
