= Jimeno Íñiguez =

Spanish nobleman

Jimeno Íñiguez (c. 1090 – c. 1145) was a Spanish nobleman and the lord of Cameros from about 1125.

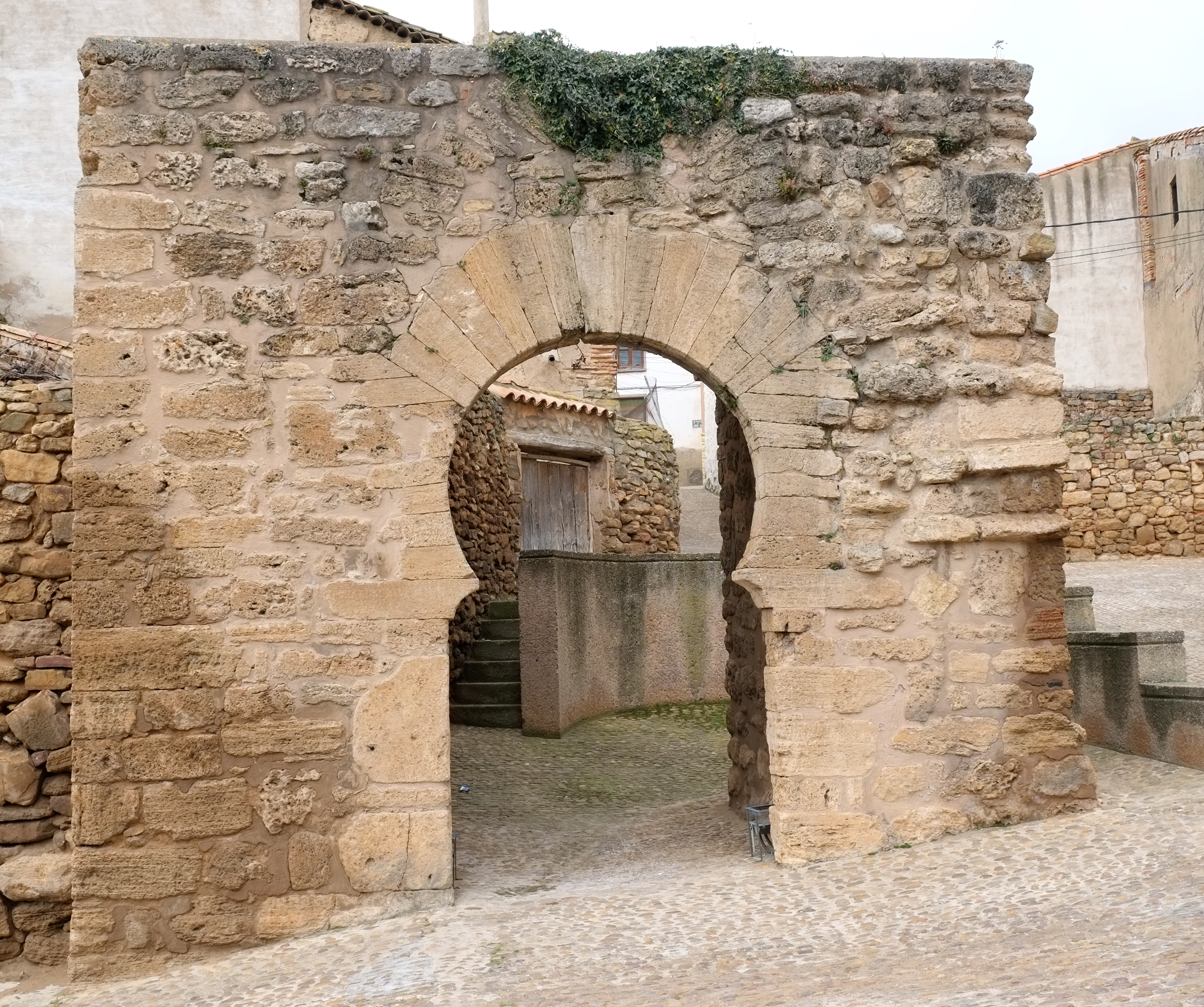
The so-called "Arab arch" (arco árabe) in Ágreda was standing in Jimeno's time

Jimeno was the son of Íñigo Jiménez, lord of Cameros, and María González, daughter of Gonzalo Núñez de Lara. He had an older sister named Urraca. He succeeded his father around 1125, but was unable to exercise control over his entire lordship on account of the conflict between Queen Urraca of León and Castile and King Alfonso I of Aragon and Navarre. He initially favoured Alfonso. His step-mother, María Beltrán, was the daughter of Count Beltrán de Risnel, one of Alfonso's most powerful followers. A document of 1128 confirms that he was then holding the town of Ágreda on behalf of Alfonso.

In 1132, Jimeno changed his allegiance, submitting to Urraca's son, Alfonso VII, while maintaining control of Ágreda. It is not clear how much control he exercised in Cameros at this time. Shortly after, he issued a fuero (charter of rights) to the town. In 1136, Alfonso VII made him lord of Calahorra. In 1144, he granted him the realengo (royal domains) in Robres and Nalda. He died not long after, for by 1147 his son Pedro Jiménez had recouped Cameros. Besides Pedro, he had two sons: Diego, who succeeded Pedro, and Sancho. He also had three daughters: Urraca, Teresa and Sancha.

== Bibliography ==
- Sánchez de Mora, Antonio (2003). La nobleza castellana en la plena Edad Media: el linaje de Lara (PhD diss.). Universidad de Sevilla. hdl:11441/15220.
- Sánchez de Mora, Antonio (2018). "Íñiguez de los Cameros, Jimeno". Diccionario biográfico español. Real Academia de la Historia.
