= Gonzalo Núñez de Lara =

Spanish noble

Gonzalo Núñez I (fl. 1059 – 1106) was an early member of the House of Lara, whom modern historians and genealogists agree is the first clearly identifiable member of this lineage. (Note: "The difference between 'house' and 'lineage' is that lineage is linear, from male to male descendants, whereas 'house' includes both men and women".) The House of Lara was a very prominent family of nobility in the kingdoms of Castile and León and several of its members played a prominent role in the history of medieval Spain. Possibly related to the Salvadórez, the sons of Salvador González and, by marriage, to the Alfonsos from Tierra de Campos and Liébana, as well as the Álvarez from Castile, Gonzalo was most probably a descendant of the Counts of Castile.

== Debated origins ==
The filiation proposed by Luis de Salazar y Castro in his work on the House of Lara, has been accepted for centuries although several modern historians question its accuracy. According to Salazar y Castro, Gonzalo was the third member of this lineage with that name and was a descendant of the counts of Castile as the son of a Nuño or Munio González who would have been the son of Gonzalo Fernández, the first-born of count Fernán González. (Note: Salazar y Castro's proposed filiation is mentioned in his work Pruebas de la Casa de Lara, Vol. I pp. 20–28 and 85–100.) The author, however, confuses several namesakes, assuming that they are the same person, and does not provide any documentary evidence sustaining that filiation. Moreover, according to medieval charters, Gonzalo Fernández, the son of Fernán González, appears for the last time on 29 June 959 and in February 984 his widow, Fronilde Gómez, made a donation for the soul of her deceased husband to the Monastery of San Pedro de Cardeña and only mentions one son named Sancho.

Ramón Menéndez Pidal in La España del Cid (1929) believed that Gonzalo Núñez was the son of a Munio or Nuño Salvadórez who would have been the brother of Gonzalo Salvadórez. The historian María del Carmen Carlé in her work "Gran Propiedad y grandes propietarios" (1973) suggested a relationship with the Salvadórez. According to her hypothesis, the relationship would be through Goto González, a daughter of Gonzalo Salvadórez and wife of Nuño Álvarez, who would have been the parents of Gonzalo Núñez de Lara. Nevertheless, according to several charters, Goto González Salvadórez was married to the Asturian count Fernando Díaz, (Note: On 18 June 1087 Fernando Díaz appears in the Monastery of San Salvador de Oña executing the will of his deceased wife Goto, giving to the monastery all that she had inherited from her father and from her uncle Álvaro Salvadórez in Hermosilla.) brother of Jimena Díaz the wife of Rodrigo Díaz de Vivar. Nuño Álvarez, who died in 1065, was the tenente in Amaya and Carazo and his family owned properties in the land between the Arlanzón and the Duero rivers, which would explain the "power of the Lara in the region".

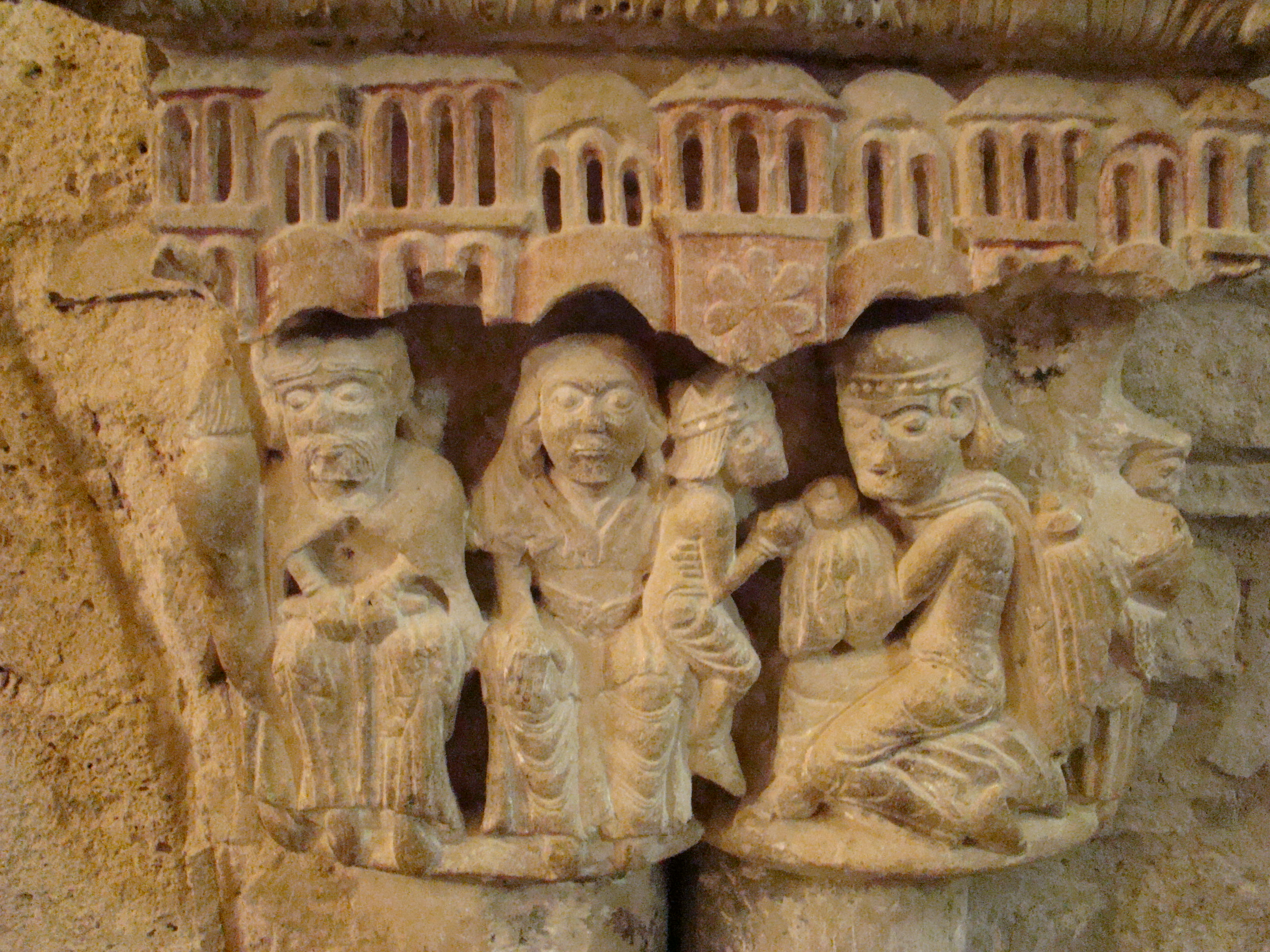
Romanesque capital of the Church of Santa María in Piasca, the former monastery whose patrons were the Alfonso and then Gonzalo Núñez and his wife Goto.

The historian Julia Montenegro in her study on the Monastery of Santa María la Real de Piasca documented a relationship with the lineage of the Alfonsos, the origin of the Osorios, Villalobos, and Froilaz. According to her hypothesis, Gutierre Alfonso and his wife Goto were the parents of María Gutiérrez who married the Castilian magnate Nuño Álvarez, and this couple would have been the parents of Gonzalo Núñez.

The medievalist scholar and professor Margarita Torres Sevilla-Quiñones de León agrees that there was in fact a relationship with the Alfonsos, nevertheless, she proves that María Gutiérrez and Nuño Álvarez were not Gonzalo's parents, but rather those of his wife Goto Núñez, as evidenced in a donation made in 1087 by Gonzalo, his wife Goto, and his sister-in-law Urraca to the Monastery of San Martín de Marmellar. A year later, the same Urraca mentioned in the previous charter made a donation to the same monastery of some properties that had belonged to her uncle Munio Álvarez and her mother María, daughter of Count Gutierre Alfonso. Urraca appears again in 1097 donating other properties to the Monasterio Real de San Benito in Sahagún, which was confirmed by Gonzalo Núñez, and, in 1088, jointly with her mother María Gutiérrez, she made another donation to the Monastery of San Millán de Suso of a property in Villa Fitero. (Note: "If Doña Urraca is the sister-in-law of Gonzalo it is because she is evidently the wife of her brother or the sister of his wife Goto. If this Urraca calls herself the daughter of Nuño Álvarez and María Gutiérrez, then the similarity of the properties owned by Gonzalo and Goto and those of Urraca must be attributed to the fact that they share the same parents, and as construed from the charters, they are sisters, both of them the daughters of María Gutiérrez and of Nuño Álvarez.»)

Another hypothesis on the filiation of Gonzalo Núñez de Lara is proposed by Margarita Torres who suggests that Gonzalo would be the son of a Munio González, son of Gonzalo García who, in turn, was the son of count García Fernández of Castile. Munio González, probably the count in Álava in the year 1030 was the brother of Salvador González, tenente in La Bureba, and this would explain the relationship between the Lara and the Salvadórez. Both brothers were vassals of king Sancho III of Navarre and Munio appears often in charters with his nephews Gonzalo and Álvaro Salvadórez.

Historians Gonzalo Martínez Díez and Carlos Estepa Díez disagree with the filiation proposed by Margarita Torres. Martínez Díez maintains that it is impossible to confirm the parentage of Gonzalo Núñez de Lara with the available medieval documentation. Estepa Díez stresses that the names "Munio" and "Nuño" are distinct and that even though these may be misspelled in some charters, the correct patronymics would be "Muñoz" (son of Munio) or "Núñez" (son of Nuño). Antonio Sánchez de Mora, however, believes that although the filiation of Gonzalo Núñez de Lara is still undefined, the hypothesis proposed by Margarita Torres is the one that is probably closest to the truth. The only filiation that seems to have been proven is that of Gonzalo's wife, Goto Núñez, as a member of the Alfonso and the Álvarez clans and that even though "there seems to be close ties between the Lara and the Salvadórez [...], documentary proof is still lacking in order to be able to determine the precise ancestry".

== Biography ==
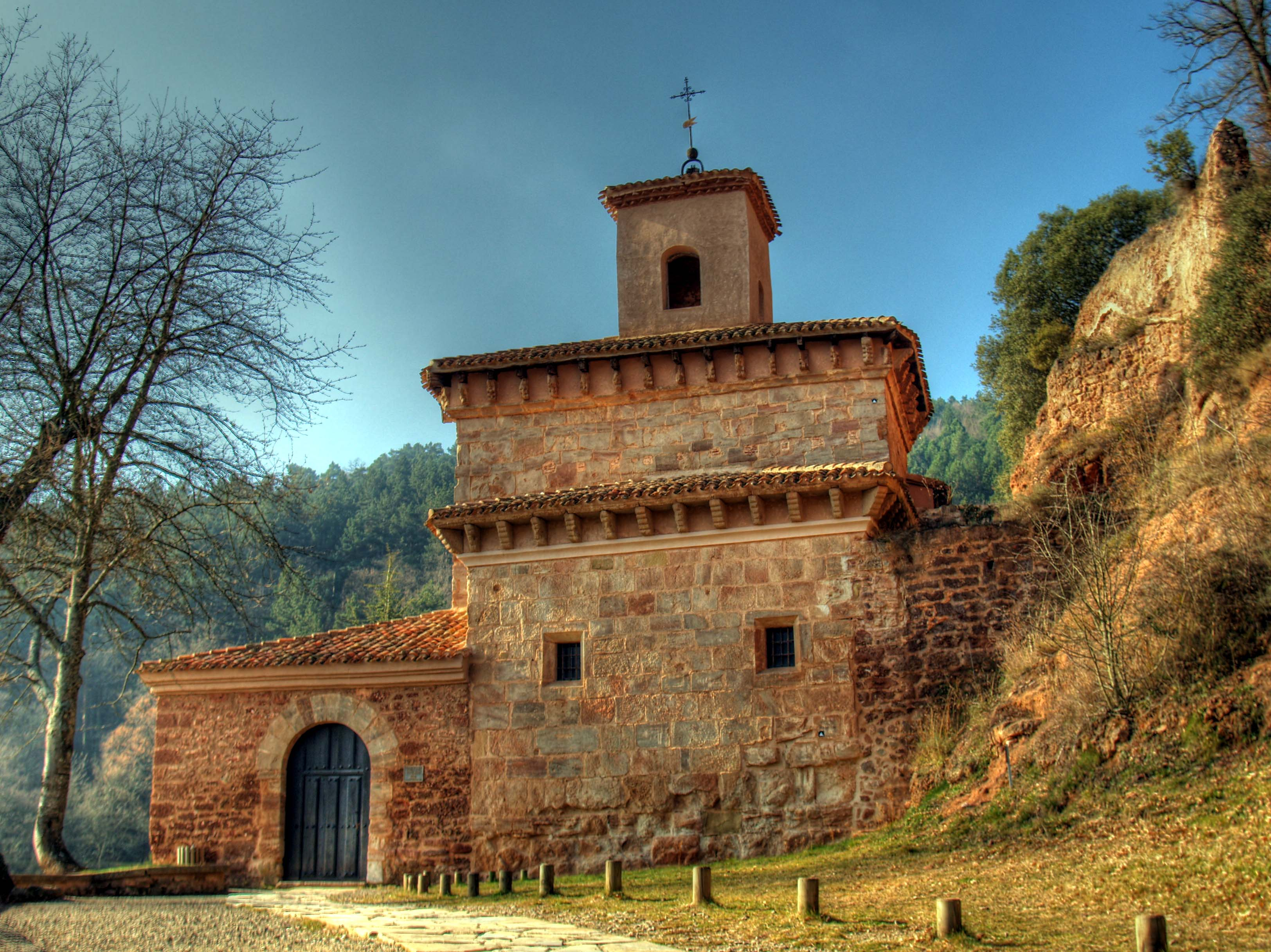
Monastery of San Millán de Suso which benefited from the donations made by Gonzalo Núñez de Lara and his wife Goto.

Gonzalo Núñez enjoyed the royal favor and "rose to great heights thanks to the largesse of the king". In 1098, Alfonso VI refers to Gonzalo in a donation to the Monastery of San Millán de Suso as his "well-loved Gonzalo Núñez". Even though he did not have the title of "count", he appears frequently in the documentation as a "senior", as was the case of other Castilian magnates of the 11th century. Besides confirming as senior Gondissalvo Nunnez, he also appears with the title of potestas and dominante Lara, the toponymic from which his lineage took its name although it was not until a century later that its members began to add "Lara" to their respective patronymics.

His presence in the curia regis is confirmed since 1059 when he appears confirming royal charters, often with Gonzalo Salvadórez, of Kings Fernando I, Sancho II, and Alfonso VI, although, in some cases, since the name of the land that they governed is not mentioned, it could refer to another namesake.

He governed several tenencias, including Carazo, Huerta, Osma and Lara, the latter governed from 1081 until 1095. He owned estates in Castilla la Vieja, Tierra de Campos and in Asturias, and held rights in Hortigüela, and in the towns of Duruelo de la Sierra and Covadela.

In 1093, he participated in a military campaign in Portugal and later in Huesca trying unsuccessfully to prevent the Almorávides from conquering the city In 1098 he played a key role in the repopulation of Almazán and Medinaceli after being reconquered in 1104 and also in Andaluz, the latter probably held as part of his properties.

He was a patron of several monasteries and he and his wife Goto had close ties with the Monastery of Santa María la Real de Piasca which had been patronized by his wife's family, the Alfonso. In a donation made in 1122, his son Rodrigo mentioned that the monastery had been built by his grandparents and that his parents had been its patrons: edificaberunt abios et patronos atque parentes nostros.

He last appears in medieval charters on 12 December 1105 at the Monastery of San Salvador de Oña and probably died shortly afterwards.

== Marriage and issue ==
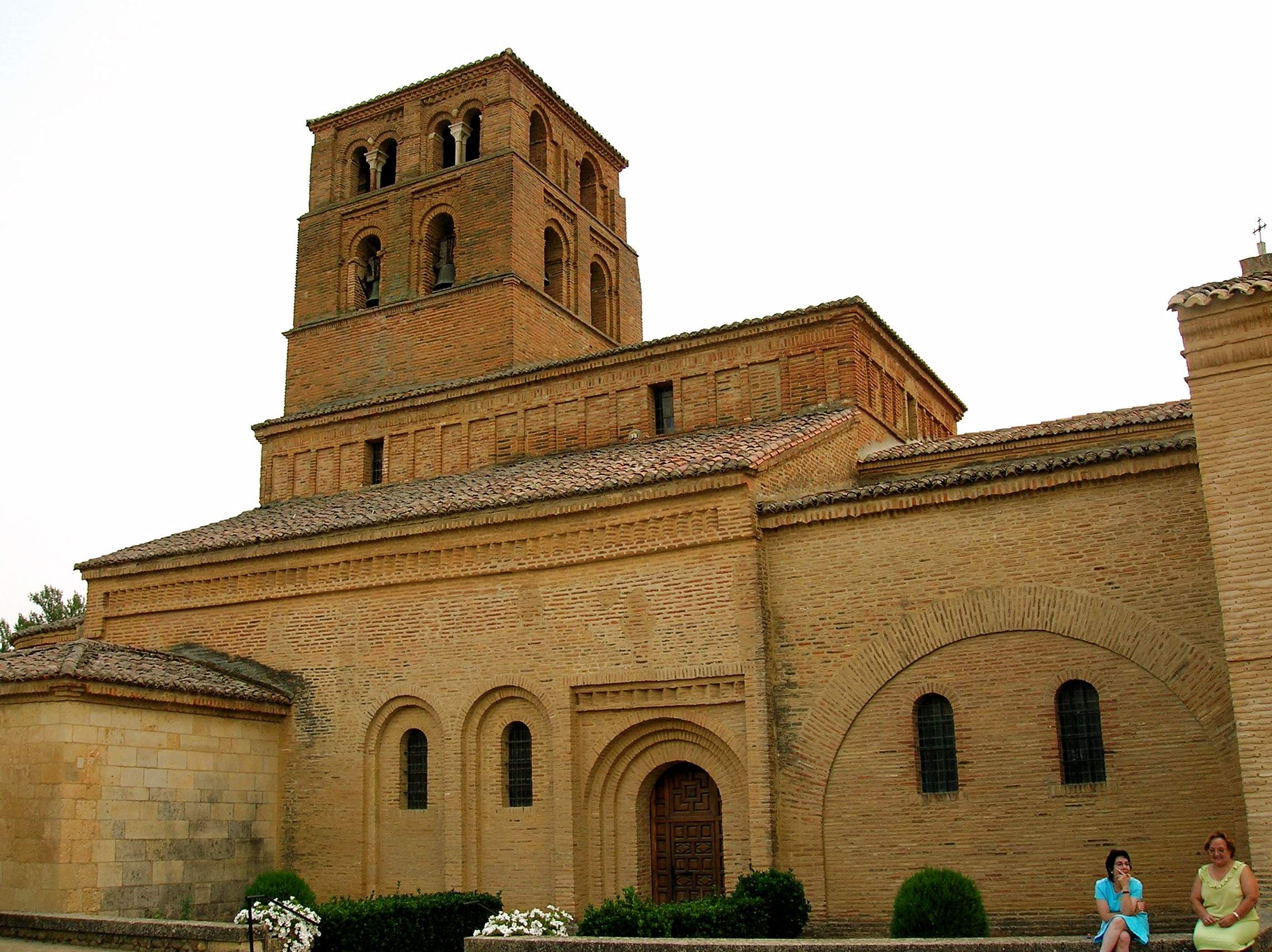
Front of the Church of the Monastery of San Pedro de Dueñas where Teresa González de Lara was an abbess.

Gonzalo Núñez married Goto Núñez, daughter of Nuño Álvarez and of María Gutiérrez, who was the daughter of Gutierre Alfonso, count in Grajal, and countess Goto, The documented offspring of this marriage were:

- Pedro González de Lara (died in 1130), one of the most powerful Castilian magnates of his time and lover of Queen Urraca with whom he had issue.
- Rodrigo González de Lara (died after 1144), count and a prominent member of the House of Lara.
- Teresa González de Lara. In 1035, Gonzalo and Goto offered their daughter Teresa to the Royal Monastery of San Benito in Sahagún and to the Monastery of San Pedro de los Molinos, donating several properties most of which came from the Alfonso family. Teresa became a nun and was later the abbess at the Monastery of San Pedro de las Dueñas from 1126 to 1137.
- María González de Lara (died after 1141) married Íñigo Jiménez, lord of Cameros and of the valley of Arnedo before June 1109, the year that they both executed a will. She appears with her son, also lord of Cameros confirming a donation made by his brother Rodrigo to the Monastery of San Pedro de Arlanza. (Note: Luis de Salazar y Castro mistakenly asserted that María had married Jimeno Íñiguez, who was in fact her stepson, as evidenced in the charters of the Monastery of San Prudencio de Monte Laturce.)

Gonzalo could also have been the father of a Goto González who appears with her nephew Manrique Pérez de Lara in 1143 when he granted fuero to Los Ausines. Some genealogist claim that she was married to Rodrigo Muñoz, lord of Guzmán and Roa, although medieval sources confirm that Rodrigo's wife was Mayor Díaz.

Salazar y Castro added other daughters whose existence is undocumented and doubtful. One of them was Elvira González de Lara married to Pedro Núñez de Fuentearmegil, and another daughter named Sancha González who he claimed was the wife of Count Fernando Pérez de Traba, even though the documented wife of the count of Galicia was actually the daughter of Gonzalo Ansúrez and Urraca Bermúdez.

== Bibliography ==
- Doubleday, Simon R. (2004). Los Lara. Nobleza y monarquía en la España Medieval (in Spanish). Madrid: Turner Publicaciones, S.L. and C.S.I.C. ISBN 84-7506-650-X.
- Estepa Díez, Carlos (2007). "Castilla de Condado a Reino". Alfonso VI y su época I. Los precedentes del reinado (966-1065) (in Spanish). E. Fernández González and J. Pérez Gil (Coord.). León: Universidad de León. Secretariado de Publicaciones. pp. 37–67. ISBN 978-84-9773-339-7.
- Ledesma Rubio, María Luisa (1989). Cartulario de San Millán de la Cogolla (1076-1200) (in Spanish). Zaragoza: Instituto de Estudios Riojanos and Anubar Ediciones. ISBN 84-7013-235-0.
- Martínez Díez, Gonzalo (2005). El Condado de Castilla (711-1038): La Historia frente a la leyenda (in Spanish). Valladolid: Junta de Castilla y León. ISBN 84-95379-94-5.
- Martínez Sopena, Pascual (1987). "Parentesco y poder en León durante el siglo XI: La "casata" de Alfonso Díaz" (PDF). Studia Historica. Historia Medieval (in Spanish) (5): 33–87. ISSN 0213-2060.
- Salazar y Castro, Luis de (1694). Pruebas de la historia de la casa de Lara (in Spanish). Madrid: Llanos y Guzmán. OCLC 48730039.
- Sánchez de Mora, Antonio (1998). "Aproximación al estudio de la nobleza castellana: Los llamados Salvadores-Manzanedo y sus relaciones con el linaje de Lara (ss.XI-XIII)". Medievalismo: Boletín de la Sociedad Española de Estudios Medievales (in Spanish) (8): 35–64. ISSN 1131-8155. Archived from the original on 2023-03-23.
- Sánchez de Mora, Antonio (2003). "La nobleza castellana en la plena Edad Media: el linaje de Lara. Tesis doctoral. Universidad de Sevilla" (in Spanish).
- Torres Sevilla-Quiñones de León, Margarita Cecilia (1999). Linajes nobiliarios de León y Castilla: Siglos IX-XIII (in Spanish). Salamanca: Junta de Castilla y León, Consejería de Educación y Cultura. ISBN 84-7846-781-5.
