= San Millán de Juarros =

Village in Burgos, Spain

- Locality
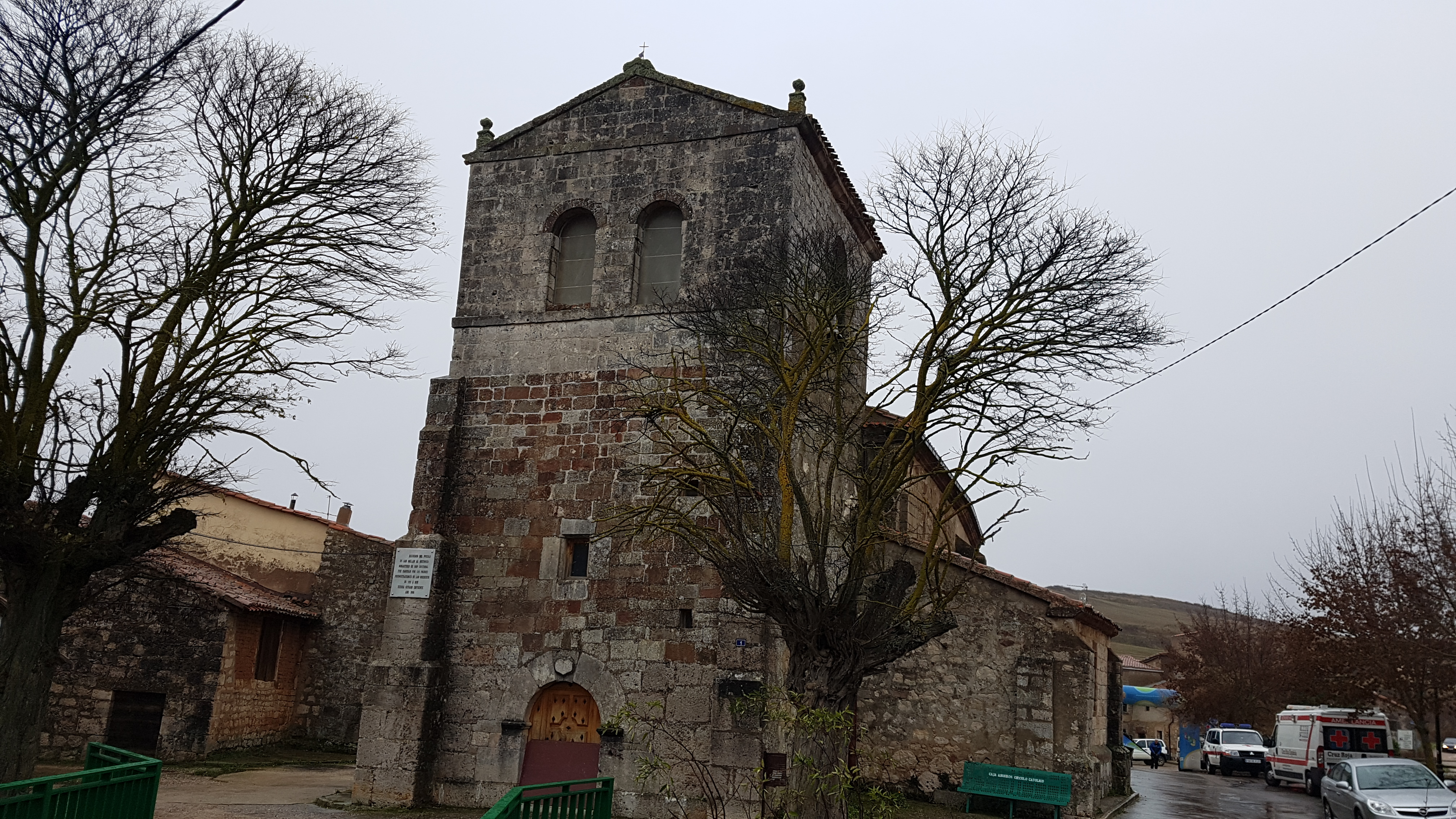
- Church of San Millán Abad

- Flag Coat of arms
- Interactive map of San Millán de Juarros
- Coordinates: 42°19′9.15″N 3°32′32.66″W
- Country: Spain
- Province: Burgos
- Comarca: Alfoz de Burgos
- Municipality: Ibeas de Juarros

Population (2024)
  - Total: 120
- Website: San Millán de Juarros (Ibeas de Juarros)

San Millán de Juarros (Spanish pronunciation: [sˈan miʎˈan dˈe xwˈaɾɾos]) is a locality belonging to the municipality of Ibeas de Juarros, inside the province of Burgos, autonomous community of Castile and León, Spain. It belongs to the comarca of Alfoz de Burgos and to the judicial district of Burgos. According to the 2024 census (INE), San Millan de Juarros has a population of 120 inhabitants.

The toponym refers to Aemilian of Cogolla a venerated Iberian saint known as San Millán throughout Spain. The phrase "de Juarros" denotes belonging to the traditional comarca of Juarros, "Juarros" derives from the ancient Basque term zugarro, meaning elm.

The village's heritage features the San Millán Abad Church, the San Andrés and Canto bridges over the Cueva and Arlanzón rivers respectively, and the remains of the San Cristóbal de Ibeas Monastery, a Premonstratensian medieval complex that once served as a significant spiritual center in the region.
