= Ibeas de Juarros =

- Municipality
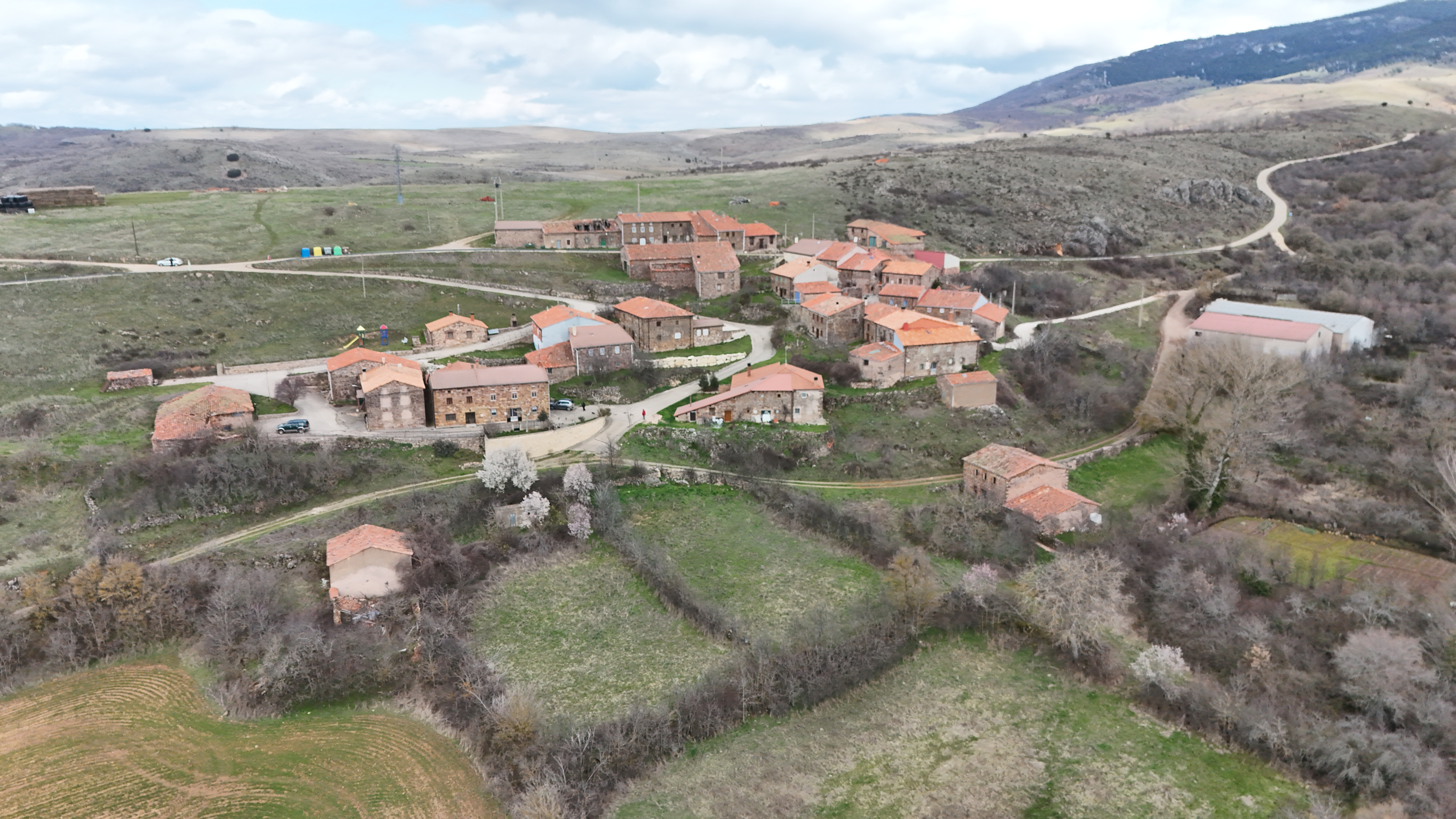
- Aerial view of the hamlet of Cabañas de Juarros

- Coat of arms

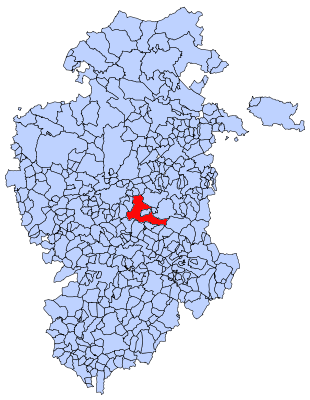
- Municipal location of Ibeas de Juarros in Burgos province
- Coordinates: 42°20′N 3°32′W
- Country: Spain
- Autonomous community: Castile and León
- Province: Burgos
- Comarca: Alfoz de Burgos

Area
  - Total: 130.27 km^{2} (50.30 sq mi)
- Elevation: 930 m (3,050 ft)

Population (2025-01-01)
  - Total: 1,492
  - Density: 11.45/km^{2} (29.66/sq mi)
- Time zone: UTC+1 (CET)
  - Summer (DST): UTC+2 (CEST)
- Postal code: 09198
- Website: www.ibeasdejuarros.es

Ibeas de Juarros is a municipality located in the province of Burgos, Castile and León, Spain. According to the 2004 census (INE), the municipality had a population of 1,192 inhabitants.

The village is near the Archaeological site of Atapuerca, designated a World Heritage Site by UNESCO in 2000. Regional policy is to promote sustainable tourism in the villages surrounding the World Heritage Site, and there is a Site Access Centre (CAYAC) in Ibeas de Juarros.

== Localities of the municipality ==
- Cabañas de Juarros
- Cuzcurrita de Juarros
- Espinosa de Juarros
- Ibeas de Juarros (seat or capital)
- Matalindo
- Modúbar de San Cibrián
- Mozoncillo de Juarros
- Salgüero de Juarrros
- San Millán de Juarros
- Santa Cruz de Juarros
