= Battle of Atapuerca =

1054 medieval battle between the Kingdom of Castile and the Kingdom of Navarre

Coordinates: 42°21′N 3°31′W

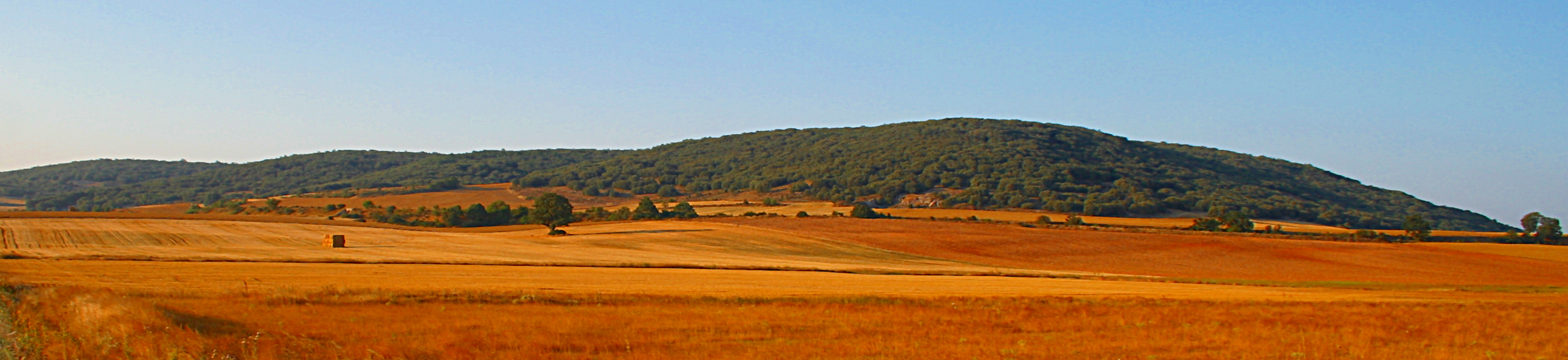
- Panoramic of the Sierra de Atapuerca
Date	1 September 1054
Location	Near Atapuerca, Kingdom of Pamplona (present-day Province of Burgos, Castile and León)
Result	Leonese & Castilian victory
Territorial changes	Reannexation by the Kingdom of León of Pamplonese territories south of the Ebro

Belligerents
Kingdom of León; County of Castile	Kingdom of Pamplona

Commanders and leaders
Ferdinand I of León and Castile; Diego Laínez	García Sánchez III of Navarre †; Fortún Sánchez †

Units involved
	Moorish auxiliary troops

The Battle of Atapuerca was fought on 1 September 1054 at the site of Piedrahita ("standing stone") in the valley of Atapuerca between two brothers, King García Sánchez III of Navarre and King Ferdinand I of Castile.

The Castilians won and King García and his favourite Fortún Sánchez were killed in battle. Ferdinand reannexed Navarrese territory he conceded to García 17 years earlier after his brother's assistance at Pisuerga.

== Precedents ==
After the death of Sancho III of Navarre, his empire was divided. García, the eldest son, received the Kingdom of Navarre, while younger son Ferdinand already controlled what was then the County of Castile, owing fealty to his brother-in-law, Bermudo III of León. In 1037, with Garcia's help, Ferdinand defeated and killed the childless Bermudo at the battle of Tamarón, and claimed the crown of León in right of his wife, Bermudo's sister, being crowned in 1038. He rewarded García by ceding to him Castilian territories from Oca to the gates of Burgos, from Briviesca to the valley of Urbel, from Castrobarto to Bricia, and from the Nervión River to Santander.

== Versions ==
=== Chronicon Silense ===
The monk of Silos wrote several decades later that an envious García attacked Ferdinand who was visiting him at Nájera during his illness. After recovering, García paid a return visit to Ferdinand to make peace. King Ferdinand put him in chains and locked him in a tower in Cea. However, the Navarrese escaped and declared war, rejecting the Castilian embassies.

García was buried in the nearby village of Agés and his tomb was recently discovered in the church there.

The hosts of Castile and León were in Atapuerca, three leagues eastwards from Burgos, already in Navarre.

García had with him Moorish auxiliary troops and maybe his brother king Ramiro I of Aragon.

=== Annals of Compostela ===
The Annales compostellani attribute the death of García to one knight of his, Sancho Fortún, "whom he [the king], had offended with his wife". Several in the Navarrese retinue preferred death in combat, and also the murderer, lord of Funes, Navarre, died in battle.

=== Crónica Najerense ===
The Crónica Najerense mentions relatives of Vermudo, who furiously engaged García, disobeying Ferdinand's instructions to take him alive.

The Navarrese kept however their places until night and took the corpse to bury him in Nájera. The proclaimed on the spot the new king, an adolescent Sancho de Peñalén.

=== Other version ===
Ferdinand is in this version the reckless brother and covets the "Asturias of Santander", Old Castile, Briviesca and Rioja. Ferdinand visited his ill brother, but suspecting him fled. García visited an ill Ferdinand then, wishing to dispel his suspicions, but was locked in Cea.

Upon escaping, he took his troops and some Moors into Castile. In Atapuerca the peace talks failed. Two traitor soldiers (one of them, Sancho Fortún), wounded him lethally. Ferdinand conceded the transport of the corpse to Nájera, took Briviesca, Montes de Oca and part of Rioja.

The border of Navarre was set by the Ebro, and the new king Sancho IV of Navarre became Ferdinand's vassal.

=== El Cid? ===
Some sources mention El Cid as one of the battlers, but being born on 1043 or 1048 he would be too young.

== Later history ==
In 1940 a commemorative inscription was carved on a 6,000-year-old menhir at the site.

Since 1996, the people of Atapuerca and neighbour towns reenact the battle on the last or previous Sunday of August.
