= Kingdom of Viguera =

European state

Iberian Peninsula

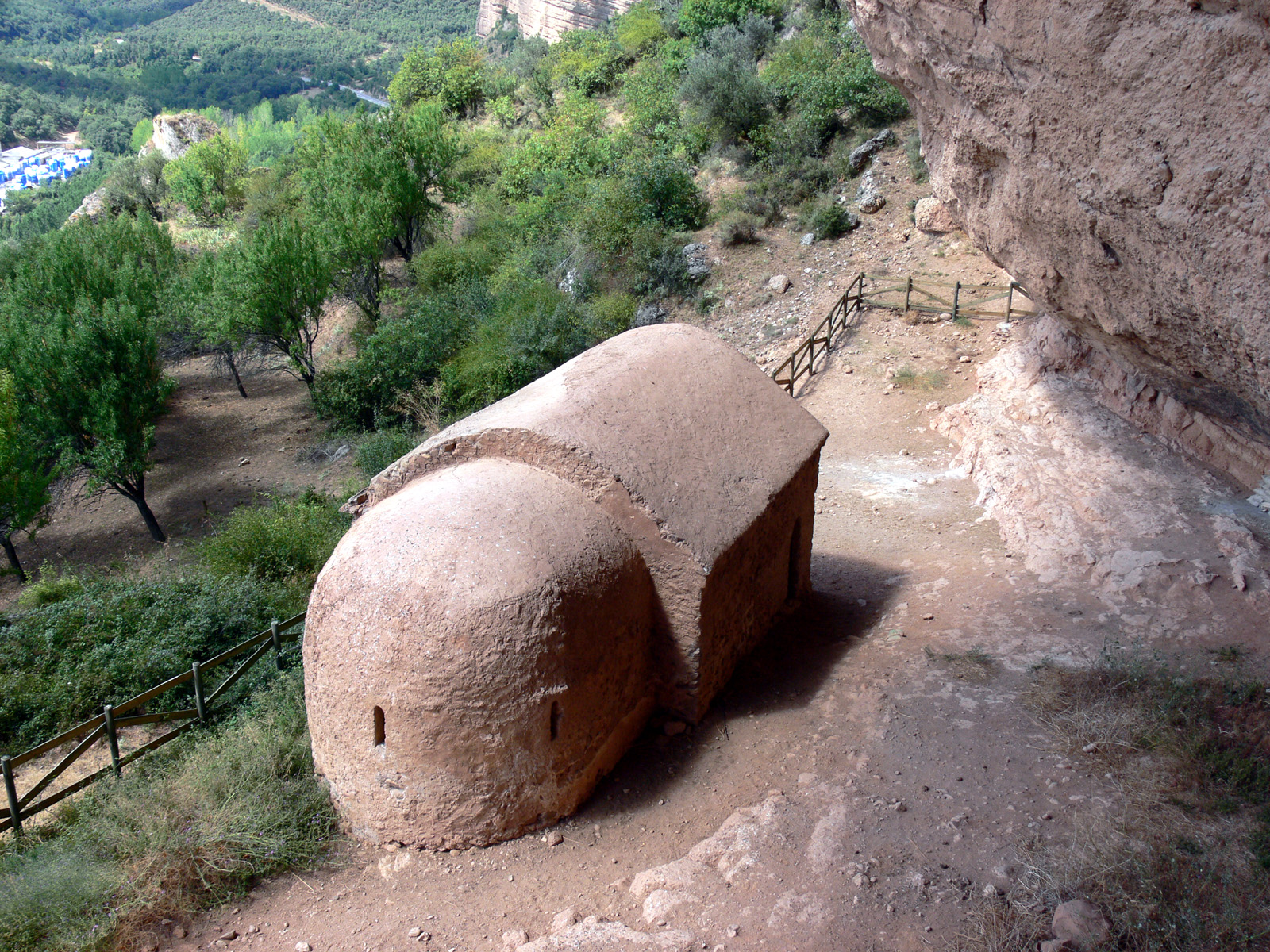
The hermitage of San Esteban at Viguera, built in the Visigothic period, is representative of a strong eremitic tradition in the valleys of the Iregua and Leza.

The Kingdom of Viguera (Basque: Viguerako Erresuma) was a small ephemeral subsidiary kingdom centered on the town of Viguera from 970 into the early 11th century. The kingdom was created by King García Sánchez I of Pamplona for the eldest son of his second marriage, Ramiro Garcés, who became the first king of Viguera. He was succeeded by two sons who ruled jointly, but on the death of the survivor of the two, sometime between 1005 and 1030, Viguera was reabsorbed into the main Pamplona kingdom.

The kingdom was carved out of the south of the Kingdom of Pamplona. Its territory encompassed the valleys of the Iregua and Leza rivers in the heartland of the present-day Rioja. It probably also included Meltria. It was an artificial creation, lacking ethnic or geographical distinctness. The kings of Viguera were always subject to their superiors ruling in Pamplona. After 1005, the territory ceased to be a separate kingdom and became just another tenancy of the crown.

In the year 918 Ordoño II of León and Sancho I of Pamplona invaded Viguera to clear out the Banu Qasi dynasty from the land. By 923, the area had been subdued and fortified. From 924 and until the year 972 the land around Viguera was ruled by Fortún Galíndez, who had the title of Duke of Viguera.

García Sánchez I of Pamplona, left as heir to the Kingdom of Pamplona his first son by his first marriage, Sancho II. After the insistence of his second wife, Teresa Ramírez of León, García I willed Viguera to his first son with her, Ramiro Garcés. After the death of García I, his son Sancho II, acting as King of Pamplona, recognised his half-brother's rights over Viguera. Ramiro was succeeded in the throne by his son, Sancho Ramírez in 991. Sancho's brother, García Ramírez acted as co-king prior to his brother's death in 1002 or shortly thereafter. García left only daughters and simply disappears from the historical record between 1005 and 1030. Later on Viguera appears again as being part of the Kingdom of Pamplona.

== List of monarchs ==
- Ramiro Garcés, from 970 until his death in 981.
- Sancho Ramírez, from 981 until his death c. 1002.
- García Ramírez, around 1002.

== Sources ==
- Andrés Valero, Sebastián (2001). "La Rioja en la Corona de Castilla". In José Ignacio de la Iglesia Duarte (ed.). I Semana de Estudios Medievales: Nájera, del 6 al 11 de agosto de 1990. Logroño: Instituto de Estudios Riojanos. pp. 229–244. ISBN 9788495747006.
- Cañada Juste, Alberto (1982). "Un milenario navarro: Ramiro Garcés, rey de Viguera". Princípe de Viana. 42: 21–37.
- García Turza, Francisco Javier (2002). "Los espacios de poder en La Rioja medieval". In José Ignacio de la Iglesia Duarte; José Luis Martín Rodríguez (eds.). Los espacios de poder en la España medieval: XII Semana de Estudios Medievales, Nájera, del 30 de julio al 3 de agosto de 2001. Universidad de La Rioja. pp. 483–509. ISBN 9788495747242.
- Olcoz Yanguas, Serafín (2010). "Fortún Ochoaz, las tenencias pamplonesas de Viguera, Cantabria, Meltria y el mítico origen del señorío de Cameros". Berceo. 158: 97–158.
- Ubieto Arteta, Antonio (1950). "Monarcas navarros olvidados: los reyes de Viguera". Hispania. 10: 8–25.
