= Quintana del Monte =

Village in León Province, Spain

Coordinates: 42°34′39″N 5°8′22″W

Quintana del Monte is a village situated 40 km from León, Spain.

It is one of the locations on the "Camino de Santiago"; it is near Sahagún. It belongs to the city council of Valdepolo, which has 1593 inhabitants

During the sixties and seventies, most of the population left the village looking for jobs and a future in cities as Madrid and Barcelona. In holidays they come back and celebrate the "holidaymaker's party" in August, although the main celebration is 14 September, called "Fiesta de la Cruz". The economy is based on the agriculture and the farming, but tourism is becoming more important. A forest dominated by hundred-year-old oaks and a lake are attractions near Quintana del Monte.
