= Arenillas de Valderaduey =

- Minor local entity
- Location within Province of León Location within Castile and León Location within Spain
- Coordinates: 42°16′43″N 5°3′35″W
- Country: Spain
- Autonomous community: Castile and León
- Province: Province of León
- Municipality: Sahagún
- Elevation: 771 m (2,530 ft)

Population
  - Total: 42

Arenillas de Valderaduey is a locality and minor local entity located in the municipality of Sahagún, in León province, Castile and León, Spain. As of 2020, it has a population of 42.

== Geography ==
Arenillas de Valderaduey is located 68km southeast of León, Spain.
