= Villalebrín =

- Minor local entity
- Location within Province of León Location within Castile and León Location within Spain
- Coordinates: 42°23′41″N 4°58′50″W
- Country: Spain
- Autonomous community: Castile and León
- Province: Province of León
- Municipality: Sahagún
- Elevation: 830 m (2,720 ft)

Population
  - Total: 20

Villalebrín is a locality and minor local entity located in the municipality of Sahagún, in León province, Castile and León, Spain. As of 2020, it has a population of 20.

== Geography ==
Villalebrín is located 64km east-southeast of León, Spain.
