= San Martín de la Cueza =

- Minor local entity
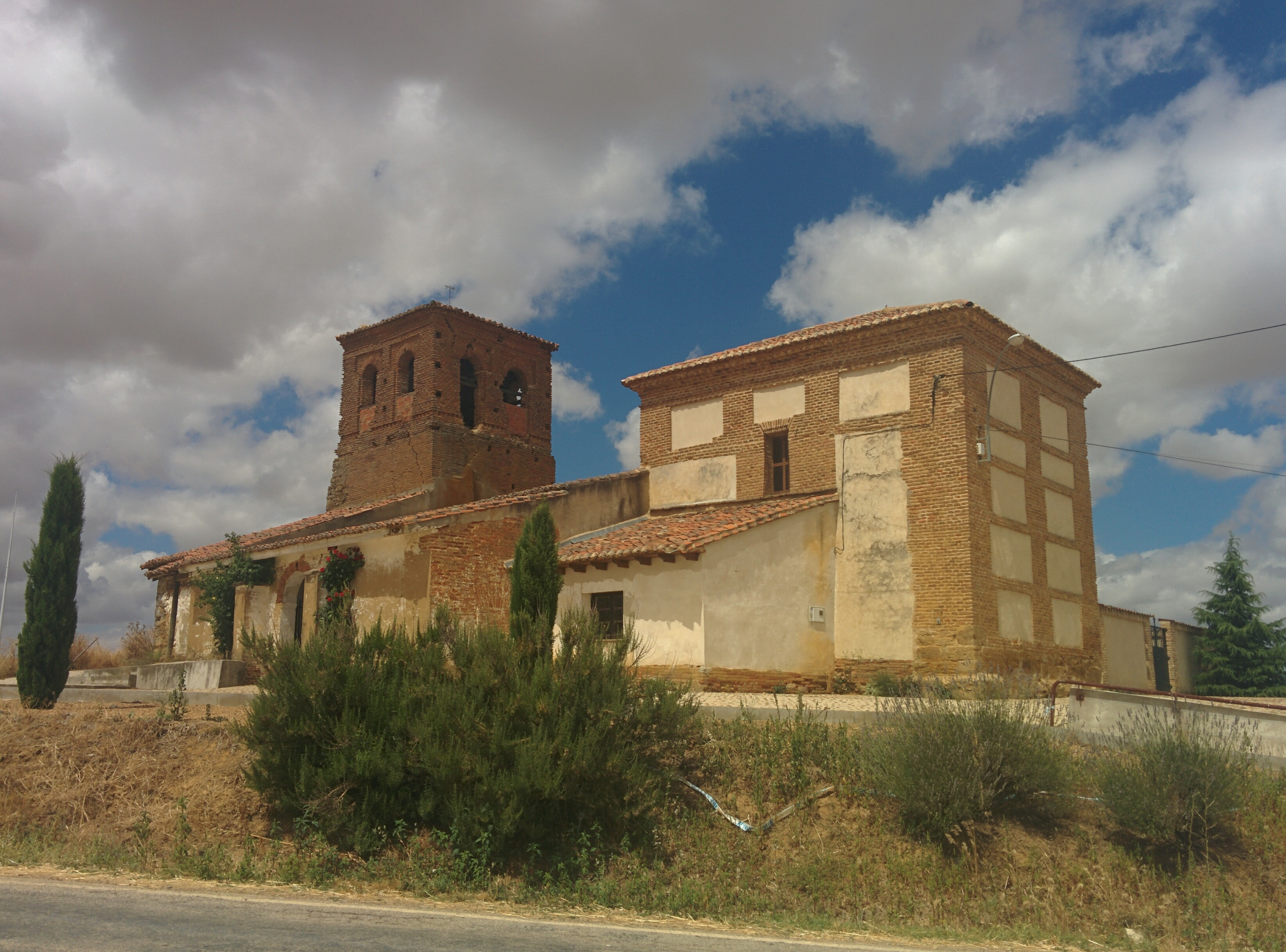

- Location within Province of León Location within Castile and León Location within Spain
- Coordinates: 42°24′12″N 4°55′21″W
- Country: Spain
- Autonomous community: Castile and León
- Province: Province of León
- Municipality: Sahagún
- Elevation: 905 m (2,969 ft)

Population
  - Total: 45

San Martín de la Cueza is a locality and minor local entity located in the municipality of Sahagún, in León province, Castile and León, Spain. As of 2020, it has a population of 45.

== Geography ==
San Martín de la Cueza is located 69 km east-southeast of León, Spain.
