= Villalmán =

- Locality
- Location within Province of León Location within Castile and León Location within Spain
- Coordinates: 42°24′35″N 4°59′11″W
- Country: Spain
- Autonomous community: Castile and León
- Province: Province of León
- Municipality: Sahagún
- Elevation: 841 m (2,759 ft)

Population
  - Total: 3

Villalmán is a locality located in the municipality of Sahagún, in León province, Castile and León, Spain. As of 2020, it has a population of 3.

== Geography ==
Villalmán is located 66km east-southeast of León, Spain.
