= San Pedro de las Dueñas =

- Minor local entity
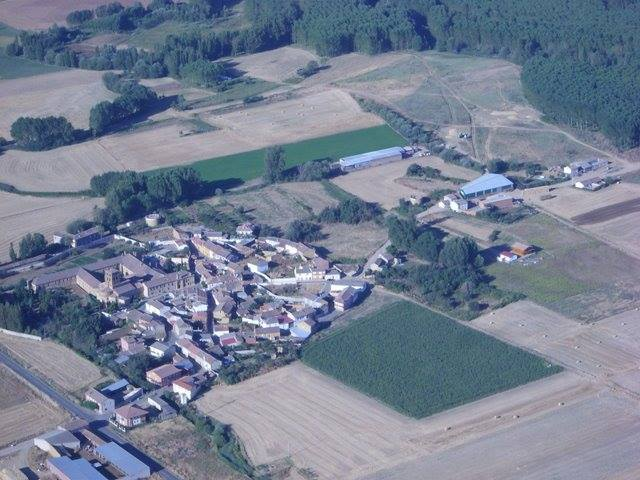

- Location within Province of León Location within Castile and León Location within Spain
- Coordinates: 42°19′53″N 5°3′1″W
- Country: Spain
- Autonomous community: Castile and León
- Province: Province of León
- Municipality: Sahagún
- Elevation: 790 m (2,590 ft)

Population
  - Total: 56

San Pedro de las Dueñas is a village and minor local entity in the municipality of Sahagún, in León province, Castile and León, northwestern Spain. It is located about 63 kilometres (39 mi) east-southeast of León and 5 kilometres (3.1 mi) south of Sahagún. As of 2020, it has a population of 56. The village is known for its Benedictine monastery.

== Geography ==
San Pedro de las Dueñas is located about 63 kilometres (39 mi) east-southeast of León and 5 kilometres (3.1 mi) south of Sahagún, along the LE-941 road. It lies on the left side of the Cea River valley.

== Landmarks ==
=== Church ===
Built in the late 10th and early 11th centuries, the Church of San Pedro de las Dueñas is one of the most representative examples of Mudéjar Romanesque architecture from the pre-Classical period. Construction began in stone and was completed in brick (1087 and 1110). The exterior has a basilica floor plan. A square tower, with a decreasing cross-section, rises above the chancel of the main chapel. A collection of capitals is particularly noteworthy; the most unusual is the one popularly known as the 'capital of the seven nuns'.

There is a polychrome wood carving of Christ, attributed to Gregorio Fernández, inside the church. It is a work representative of the Castilian school of sculpture.

=== Monastery ===
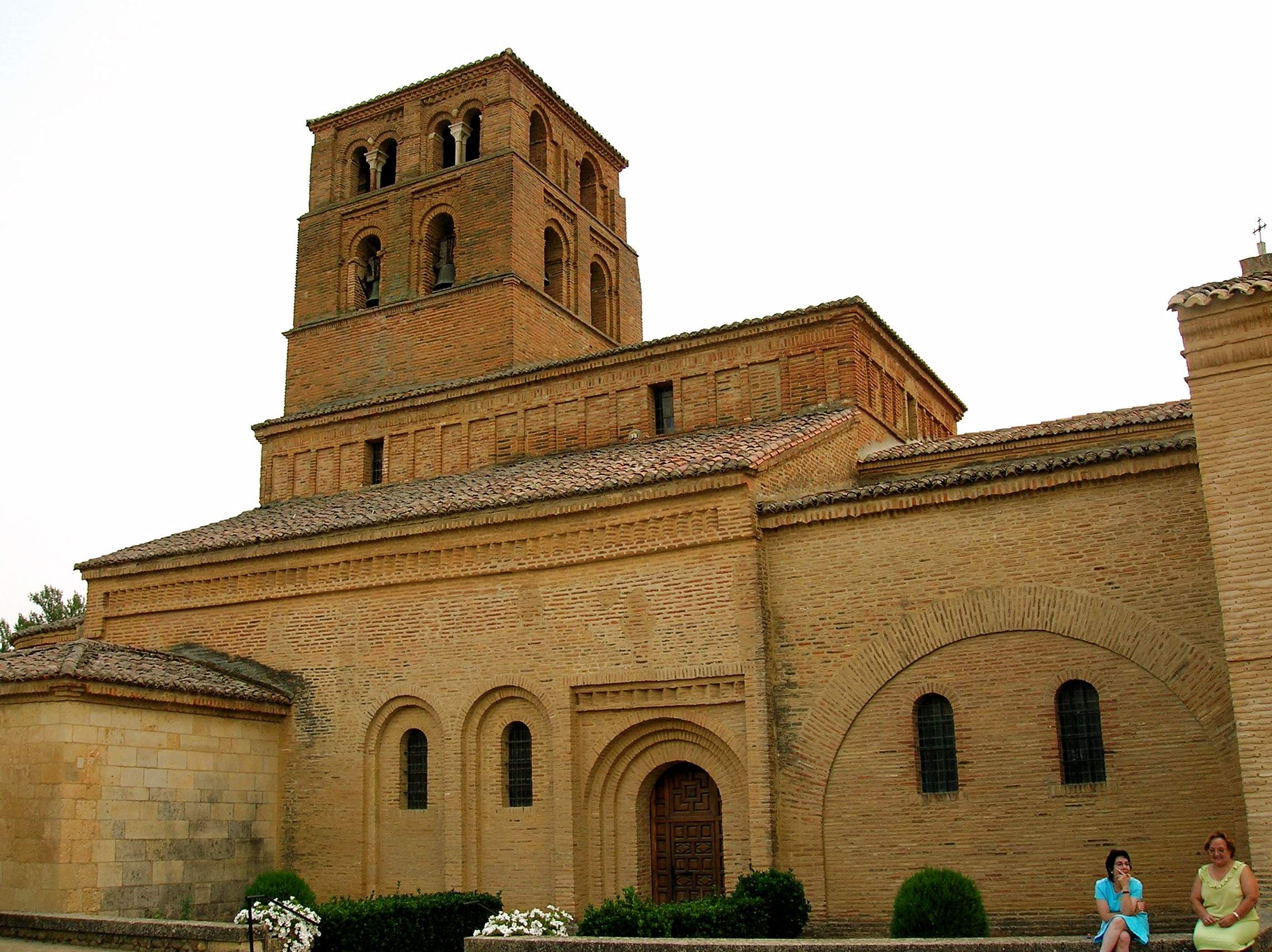
The Monastery of San Pedro de las Dueñas

The Monastery of San Pedro de las Dueñas is a Benedictine convent. Its foundation dates back to the 10th century, although the current monastery building dates from the 18th century. The original church still stands and represents the most artistically valuable part of the entire complex. It is a 12th-century Romanesque-Mudéjar structure; construction began using stone and it was completed using brick.

In 2015, UNESCO listed the Benedictine monastery of San Pedro de las Dueñas as item No. 1435 when it approved the extension of the Camino de Santiago in Spain to include the "Routes of Santiago de Compostela: Camino Francés and Routes of Northern Spain".
