= Galleguillos de Campos =

- Minor local entity
- Location within Province of León Location within Castile and León Location within Spain
- Coordinates: 42°18′19″N 5°3′58″W
- Country: Spain
- Autonomous community: Castile and León
- Province: Province of León
- Municipality: Sahagún
- Elevation: 782 m (2,566 ft)

Population
  - Total: 88

Galleguillos de Campos is a locality and minor local entity located in the municipality of Sahagún, in León province, Castile and León, Spain. As of 2020, it has a population of 88.

== Geography ==
Galleguillos de Campos is located 65km southeast of León, Spain.
