= Joara, León =

Joara
- Minor local entity
- Location within Province of León Location within Castile and León Location within Spain
- Coordinates: 42°25′28″N 4°58′9″W
- Country: Spain
- Autonomous community: Castile and León
- Province: Province of León
- Municipality: Sahagún
- Elevation: 855 m (2,805 ft)

Population
  - Total: 25

Joara is a locality and minor local entity located in the municipality of Sahagún, in León province, Castile and León, Spain. As of 2020, it has a population of 25.

== Geography ==
Joara is located 67km east-southeast of León, Spain.
