= Riosequillo, León =

Riosequillo
- Minor local entity
- Location within Province of León Location within Castile and León Location within Spain
- Coordinates: 42°23′33″N 4°57′9″W
- Country: Spain
- Autonomous community: Castile and León
- Province: Province of León
- Municipality: Sahagún
- Elevation: 862 m (2,828 ft)

Population
  - Total: 9

Riosequillo is a locality and minor local entity located in the municipality of Sahagún, in León province, Castile and León, Spain. As of 2020, it has a population of 9.

== Geography ==
Riosequillo is located 66km east-southeast of León, Spain.
