= Valdepolo =

Coordinates: 42°35′N 5°13′W

- municipality
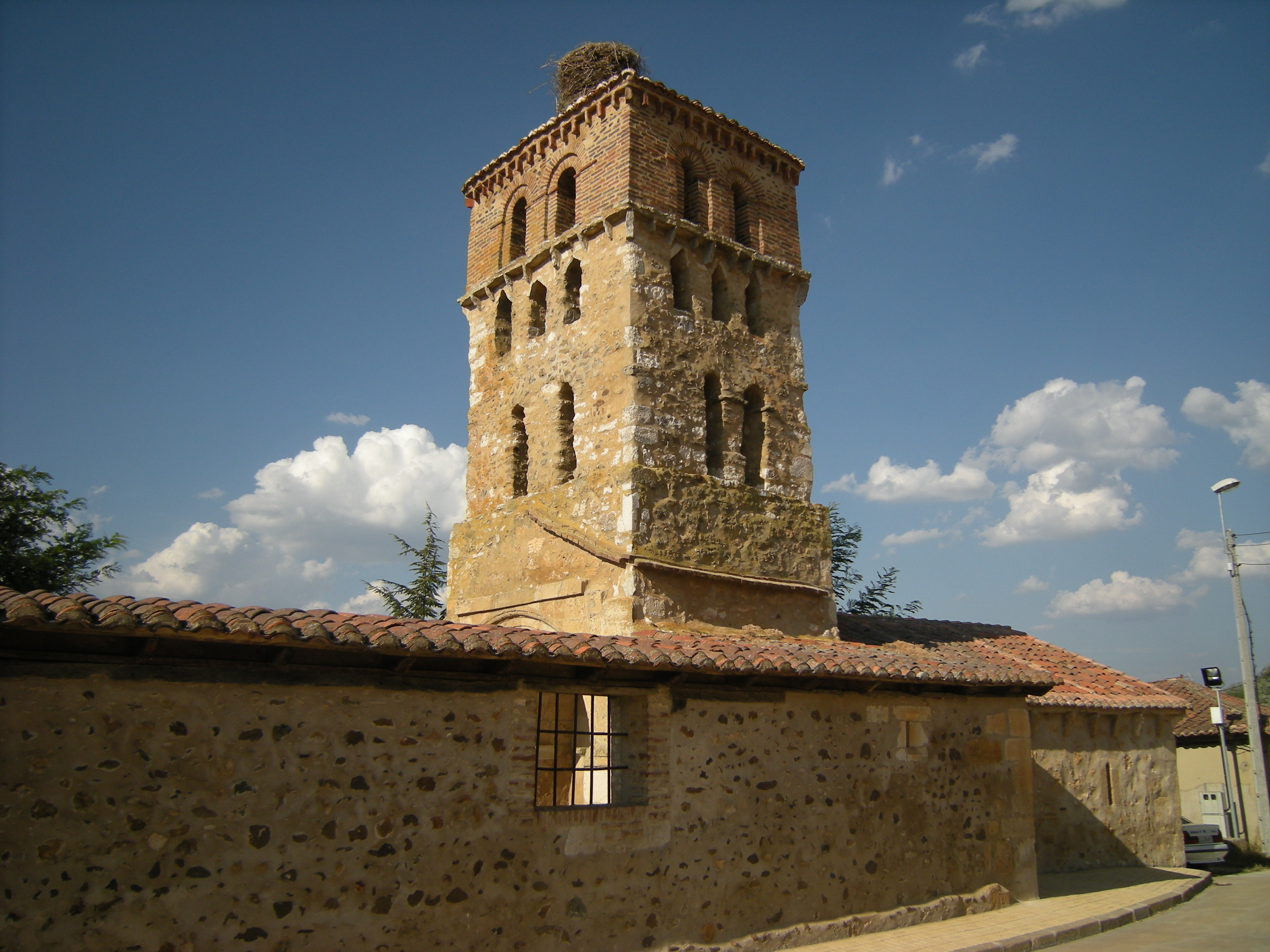
- Valdepolo church.

- Flag Coat of arms
- Interactive map of Valdepolo
- Country: Spain
- Autonomous community: Castile and León
- Province: León
- Municipality: Valdepolo

Area
  - Total: 142 km^{2} (55 sq mi)

Population (2025-01-01)
  - Total: 1,177
  - Density: 8.29/km^{2} (21.5/sq mi)
- Time zone: UTC+1 (CET)
  - Summer (DST): UTC+2 (CEST)

Valdepolo is a municipality located in the province of León, Castile and León, Spain. According to the 2004 census (INE), the municipality has a population of 1,481 inhabitants.

== See also ==
- Quintana del Monte (León)
