= Celada de Cea =

- Minor local entity
- Location within Province of León Location within Castile and León Location within Spain
- Coordinates: 42°25′41″N 4°56′47″W
- Country: Spain
- Autonomous community: Castile and León
- Province: Province of León
- Municipality: Sahagún
- Elevation: 891 m (2,923 ft)

Population
  - Total: 24

Celada de Cea is a locality and minor local entity located in the municipality of Sahagún, in León province, Castile and León, Spain. As of 2020, it has a population of 24.

== Geography ==
Celada de Cea is located 69km east-southeast of León, Spain.
