= Sahagún =

- Municipality
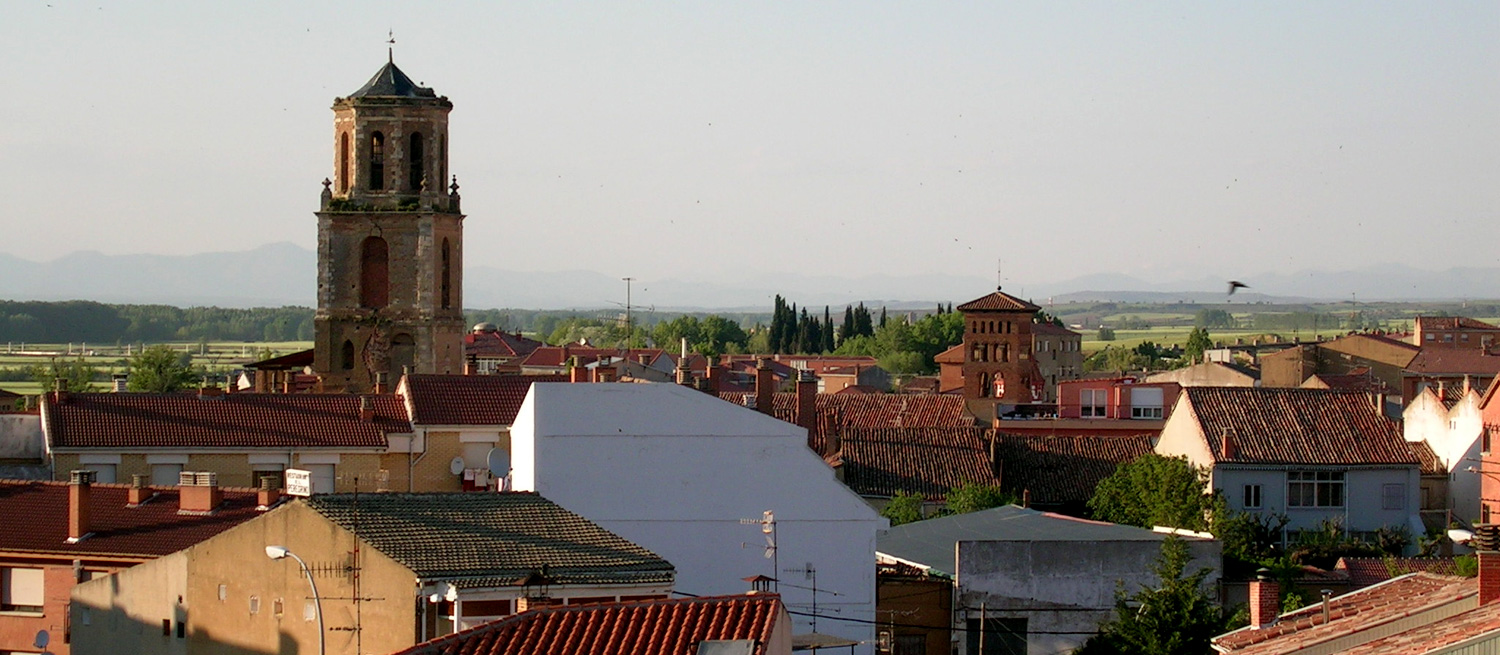

- Flag Coat of arms

- Location in Spain
- Coordinates: 42°22′19″N 5°1′49″W
- Country: Spain
- Autonomous community: Castile and León
- Province: León

Government
  - Alcalde: Paula Conde Huerta (2019) (PP)

Area
  - Total: 123.64 km^{2} (47.74 sq mi)
- Elevation: 822 m (2,697 ft)

Population (2025-01-01)
  - Total: 2,380
  - Density: 19.2/km^{2} (49.9/sq mi)
- Demonym(s): facundino/na, sahagunense
- Time zone: UTC+1 (CET)
  - Summer (DST): UTC+2 (CEST)
- Postal code: 24320
- Dialing code: 987
- Official language(s): Spanish
- Website: Official website

Sahagún (Spanish pronunciation: [sa(a)ˈɣun]) is a town and municipality of Spain, part of the autonomous community of Castile and León and the province of León. It is the main centre of population in the Leonese part of the Tierra de Campos natural region.

Sahagún contains some of the earliest examples of the mudéjar architecture. It lies on the Way of St. James and is often considered the half-way point between St. Jean Pied de Port and Santiago de Compostela. The Battle of Sahagún was a notable victory by the British light cavalry against their more numerous French adversaries in 1808.

The first settlement on the site grew up around the nearby Benedictine monastery consecrated to the saints Facundus and Primitivus. The name Sahagún is thought to derive from an abbreviation and variation on the name San Fagun ("Saint Facundus").

== Villages ==
Arenillas de Valderaduey, Celada de Cea, Galleguillos de Campos, Joara, Riosequillo, Sahagún, San Martín de la Cueza, San Pedro de las Dueñas, Sotillo de Cea, Villalebrín and Villalmán.

== Monastery ==
The monastery acquired importance during the reign of Alfonso III de Asturias, and reached its greatest splendour during the reign of Alfonso VI of León and Castile. On 25 November 1085, this latter king promulgated the edicts known as the Fuero de Sahagún, which gave a number of privileges to the Monastery and town, fomenting its growth. The king favoured the Cluniac order and the monastery was known as the "Spanish Cluny".

Friction often erupted into disputes between the townsfolk and the monastery in the mid-12th century, as recorded in the Crónicas anónimas de Sahagún. The monastery was very important on the pilgrimage route to Santiago de Compostela, and in the 14th century housed a University (see also List of early modern universities in Europe). In the 19th century, the monastery was disbanded and the structure nearly completely razed.

== Notable residents ==
- Bernardino de Sahagún
- St. John of Sahagún

== See also ==
- Tierra de Campos

== Gallery ==
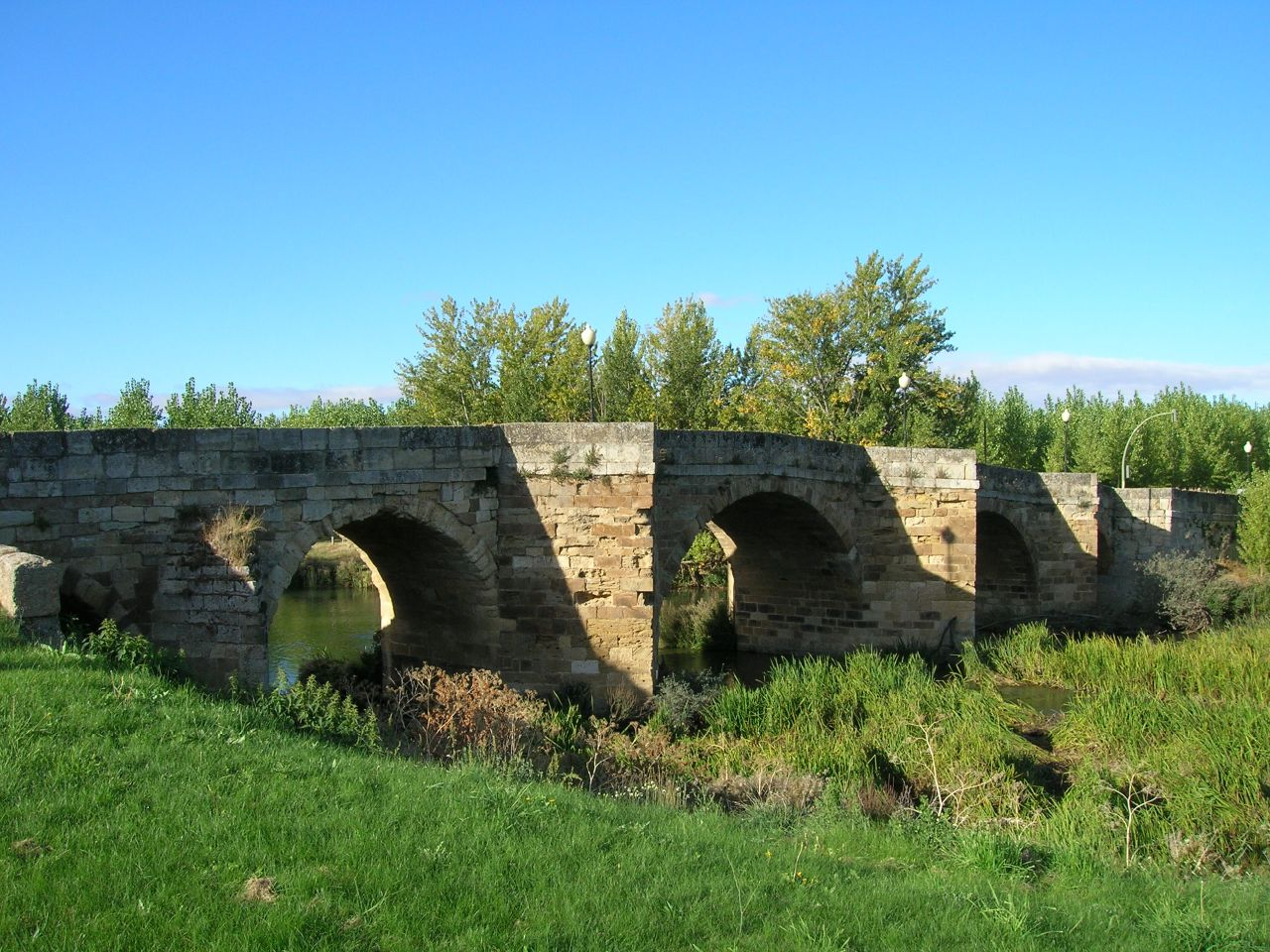
Roman bridge

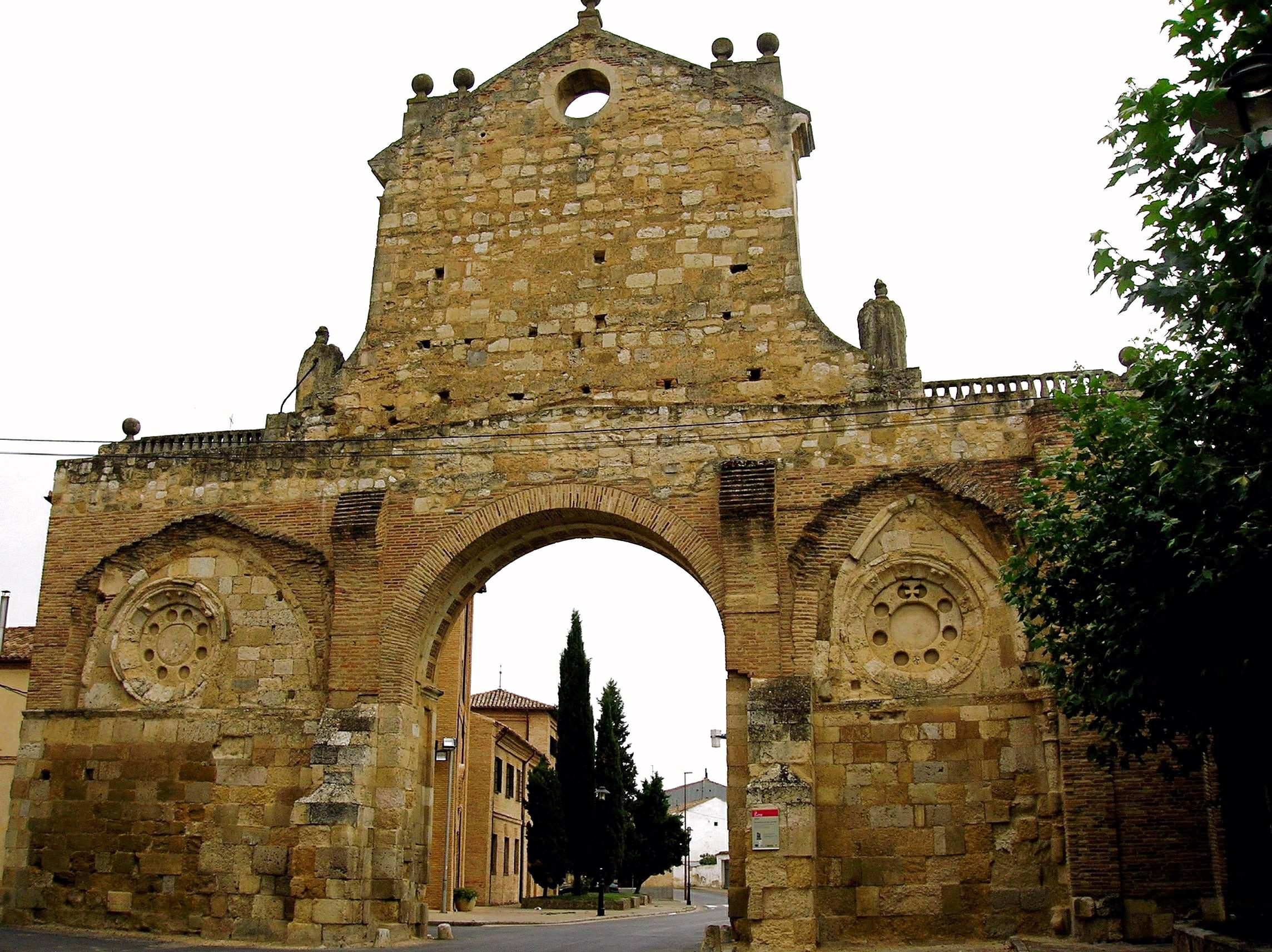
Arch of San Benito

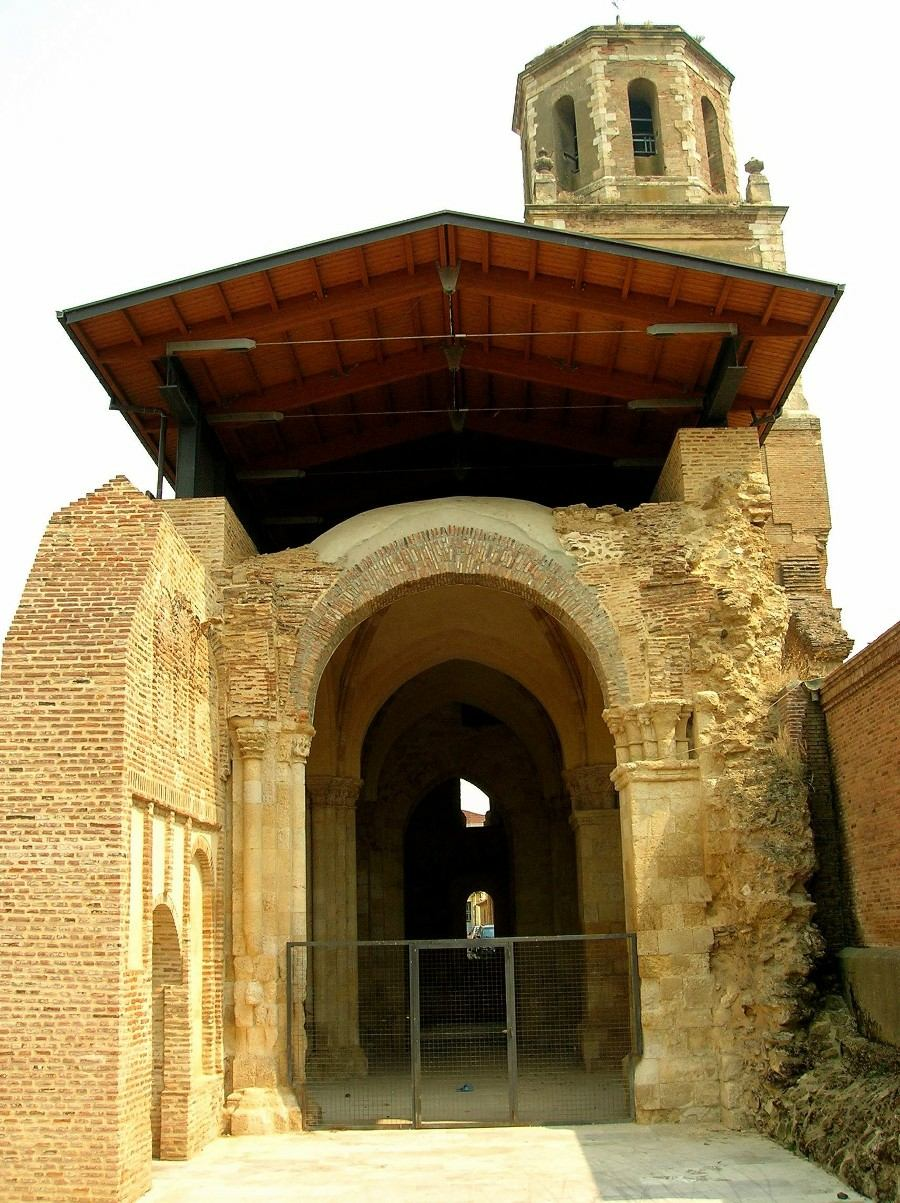
Chapel of San Mancio

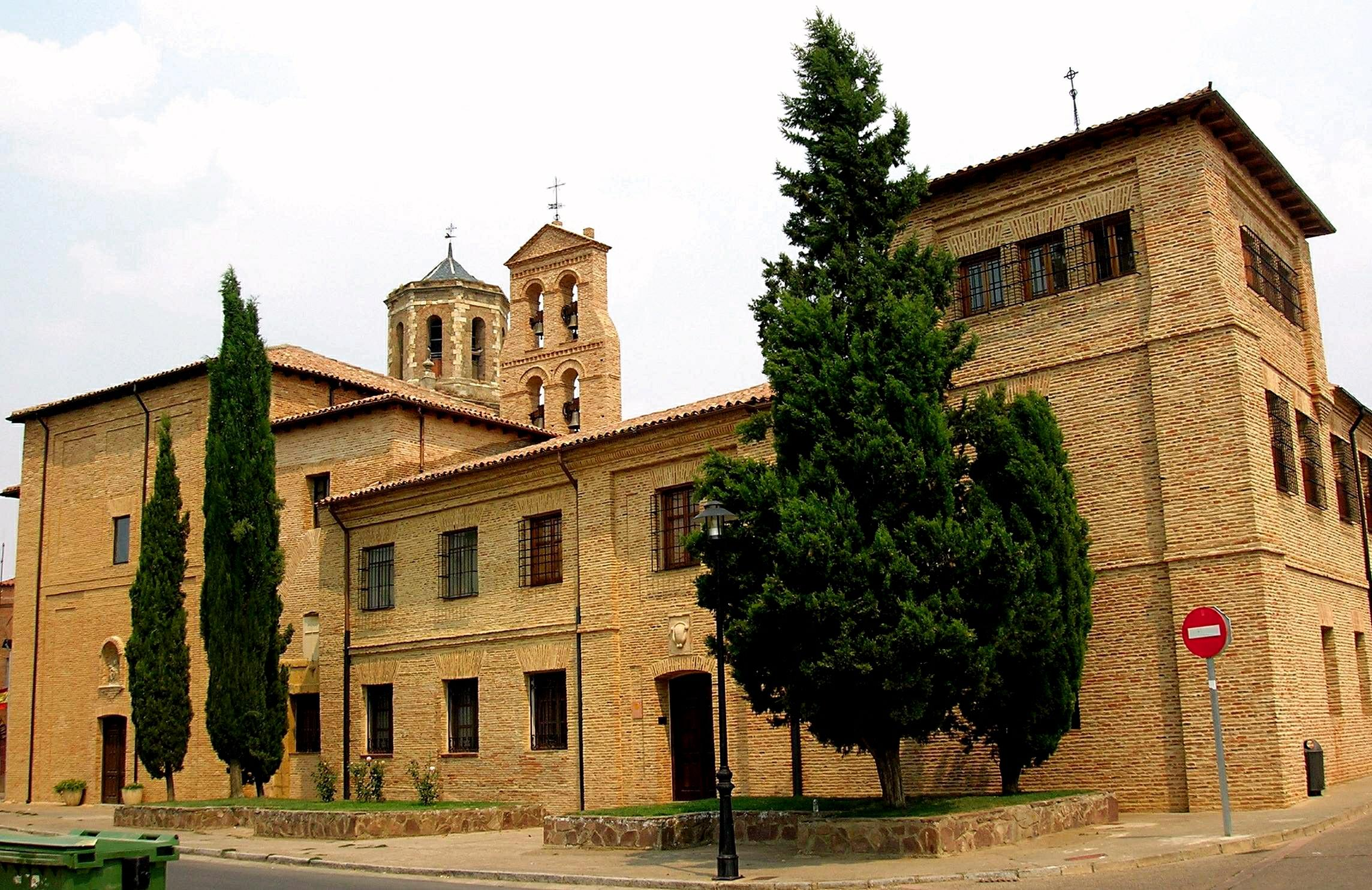
Monastery of Santa Cruz

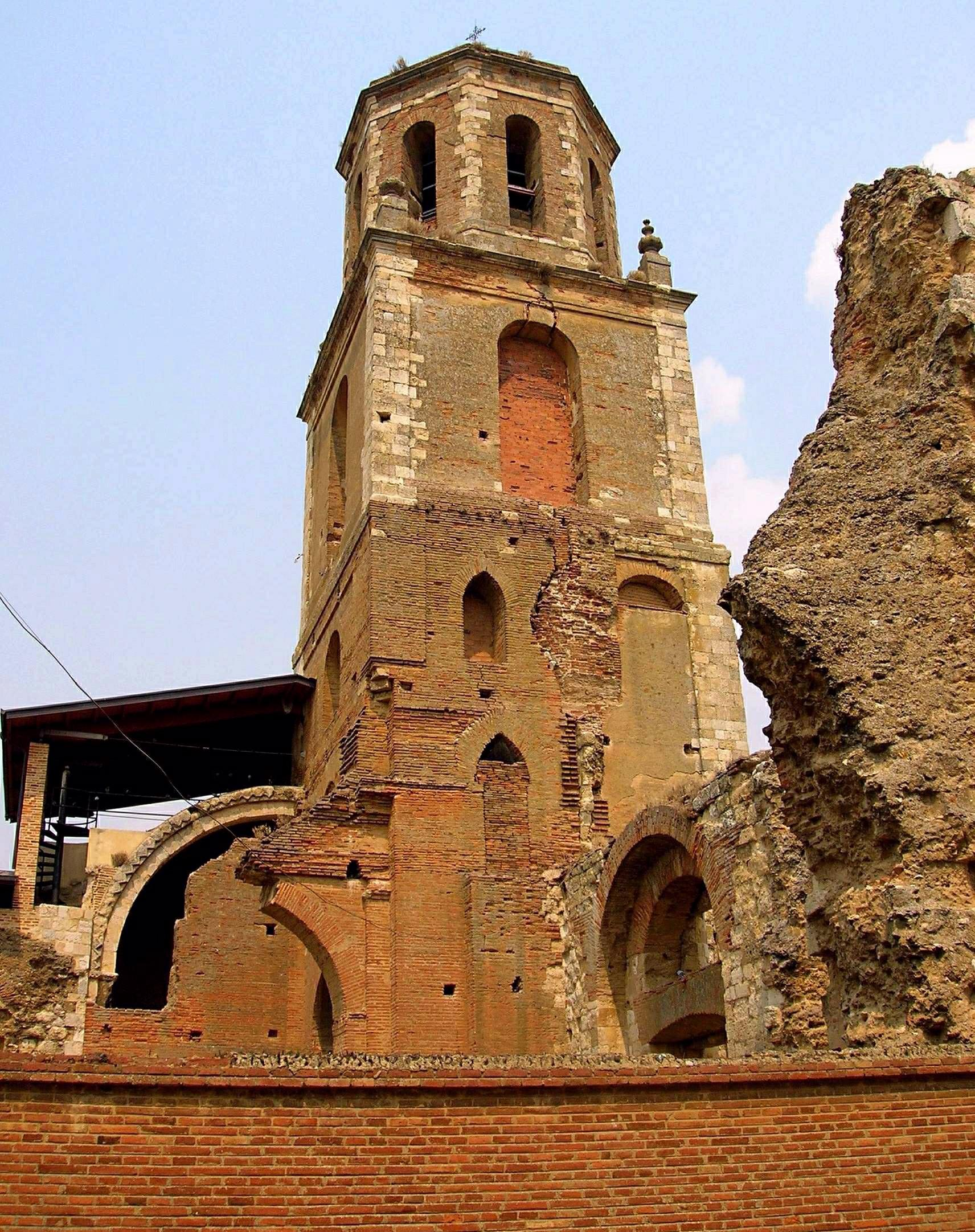
Torre del Reloj

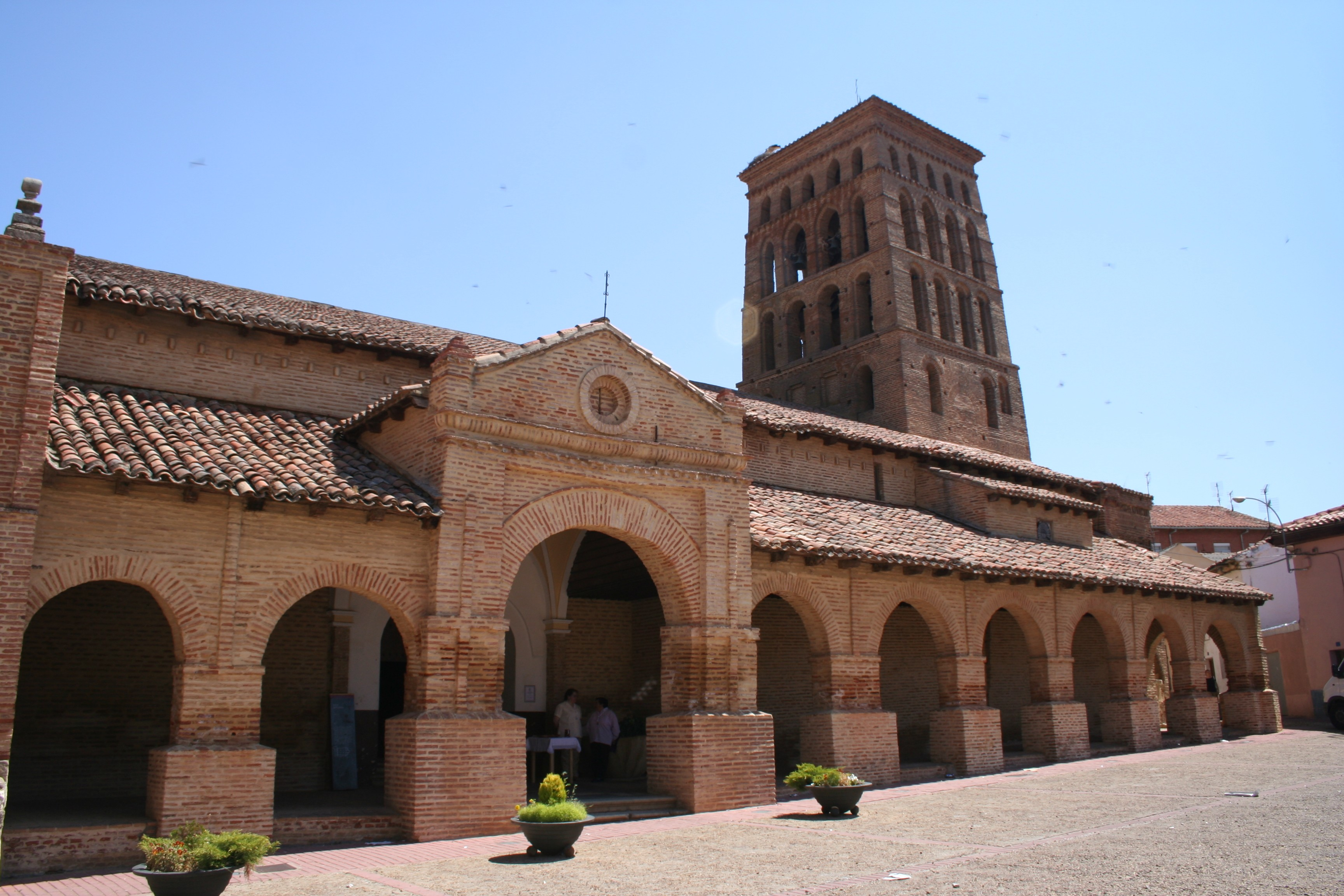
Church of San Lorenzo

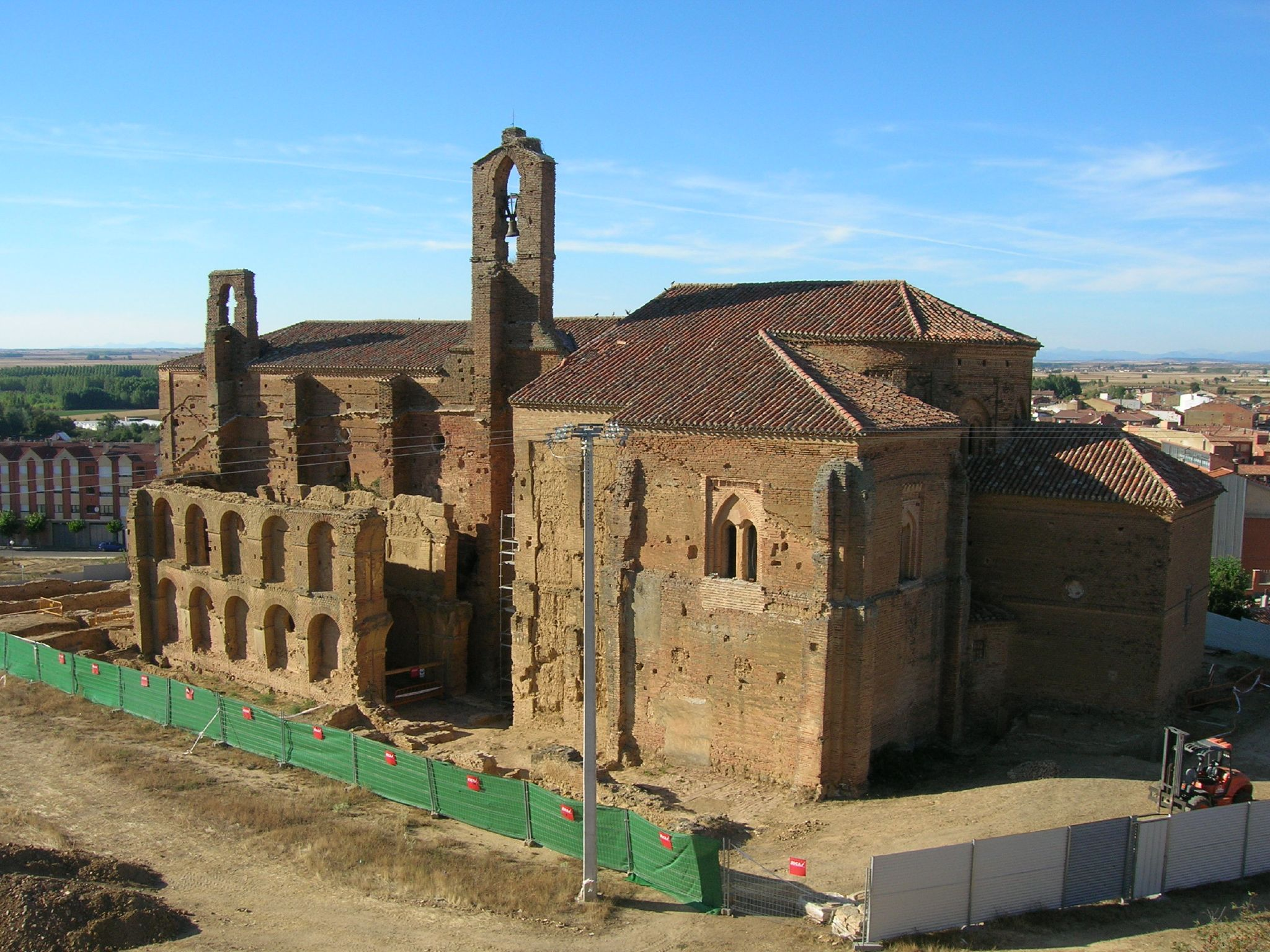
Church of the Virgen Peregrina

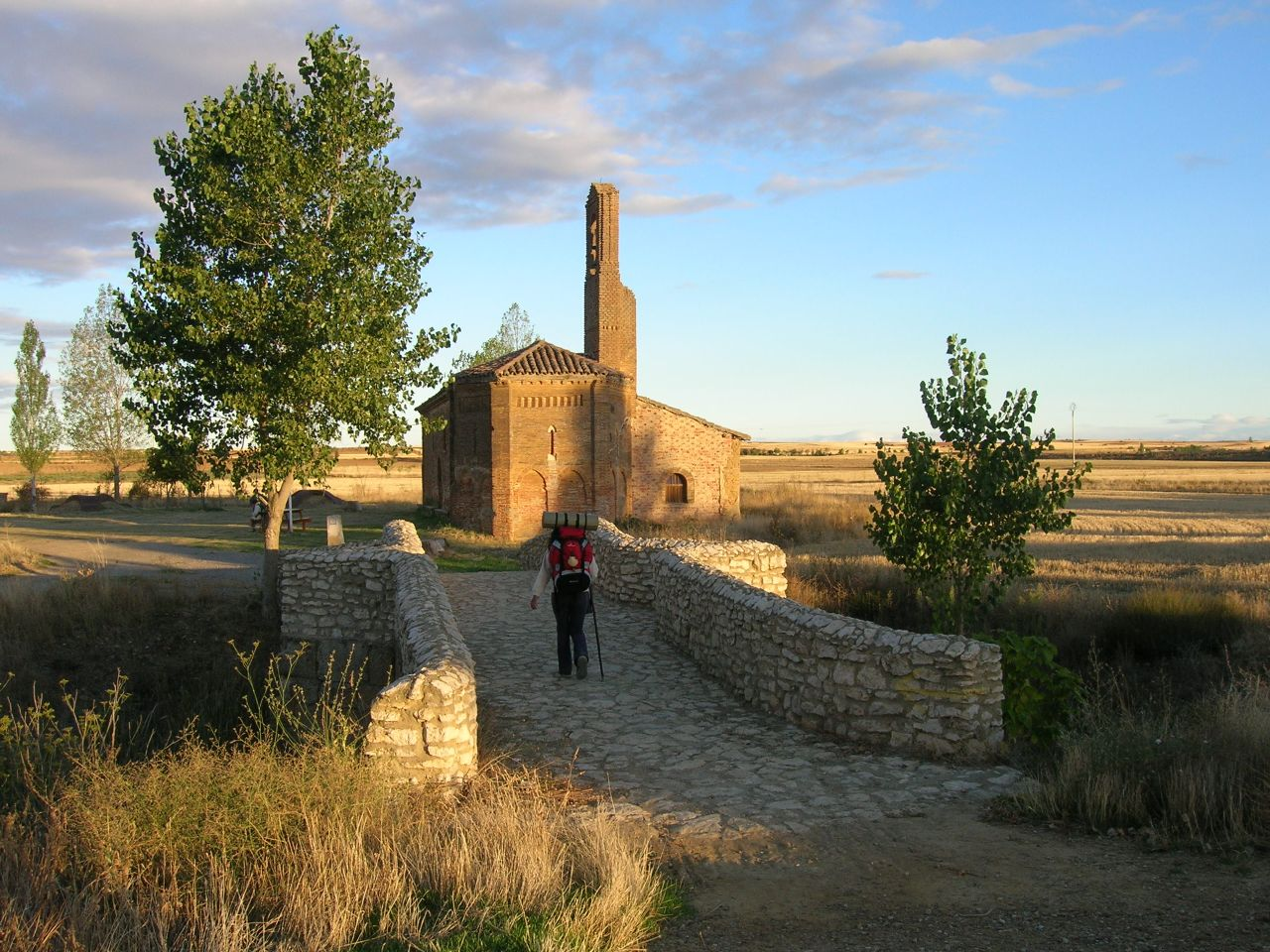
Hermitage of La Virgen del Puente

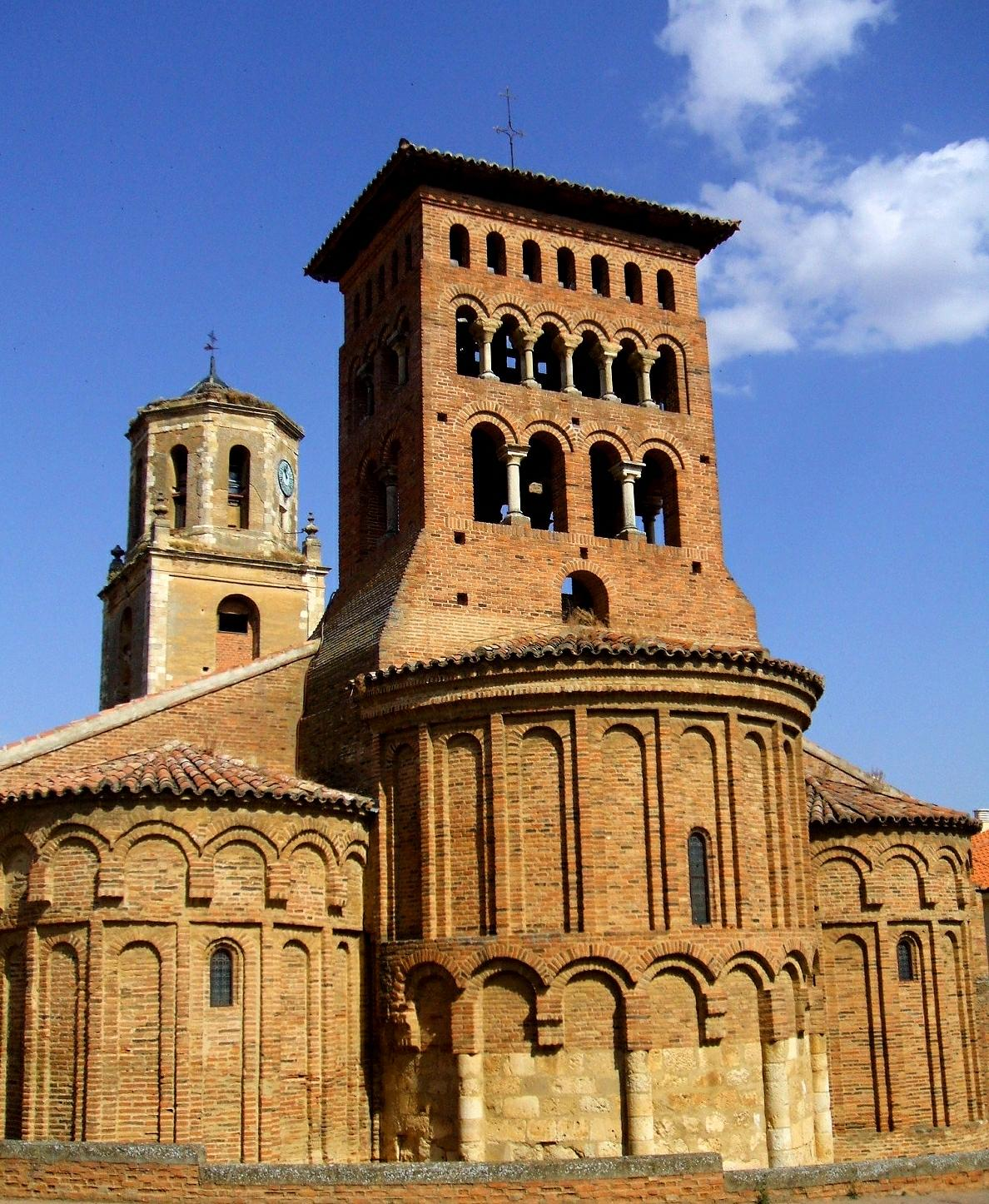
Church of San Tirso

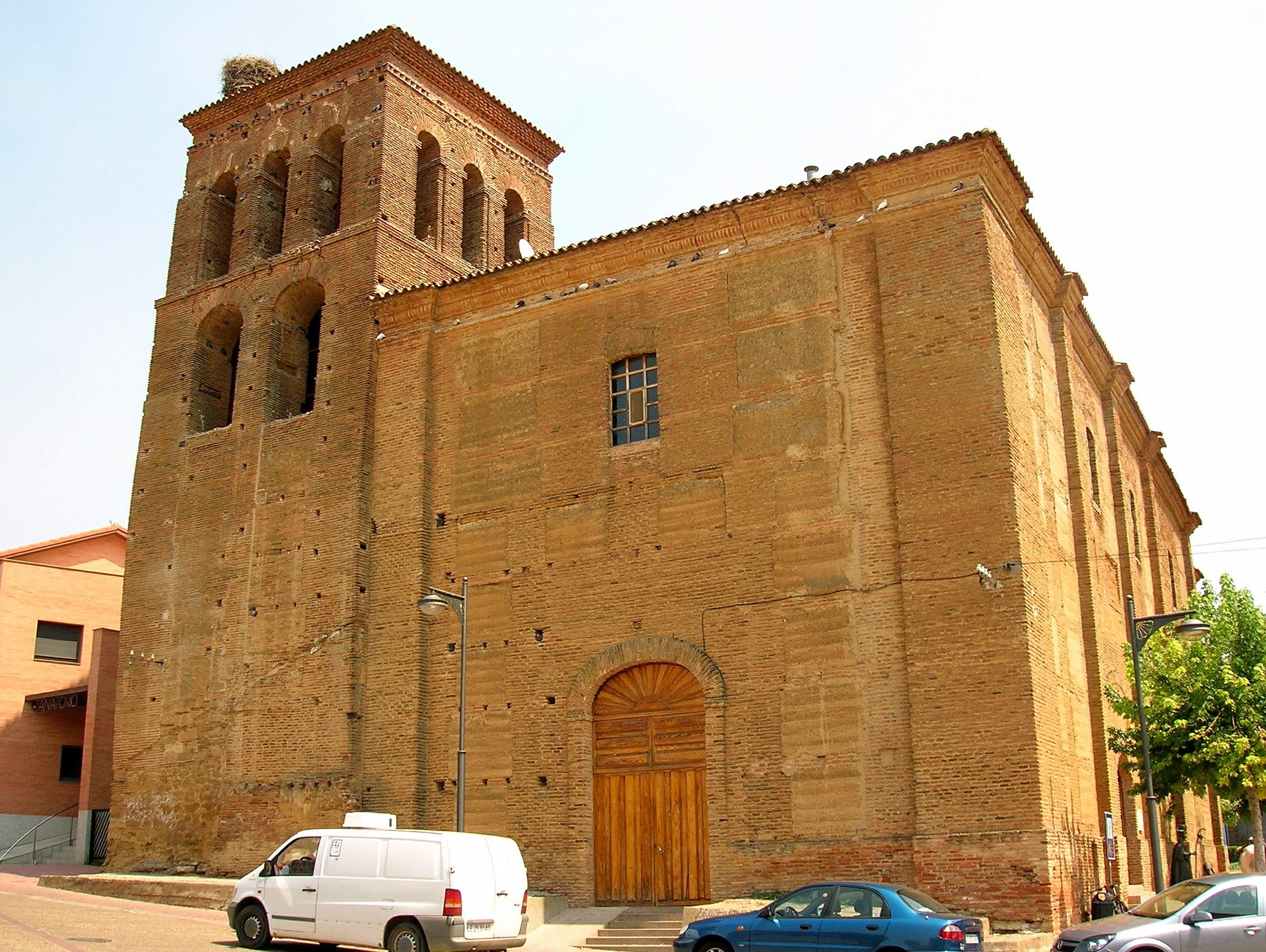
Church of La Trinidad

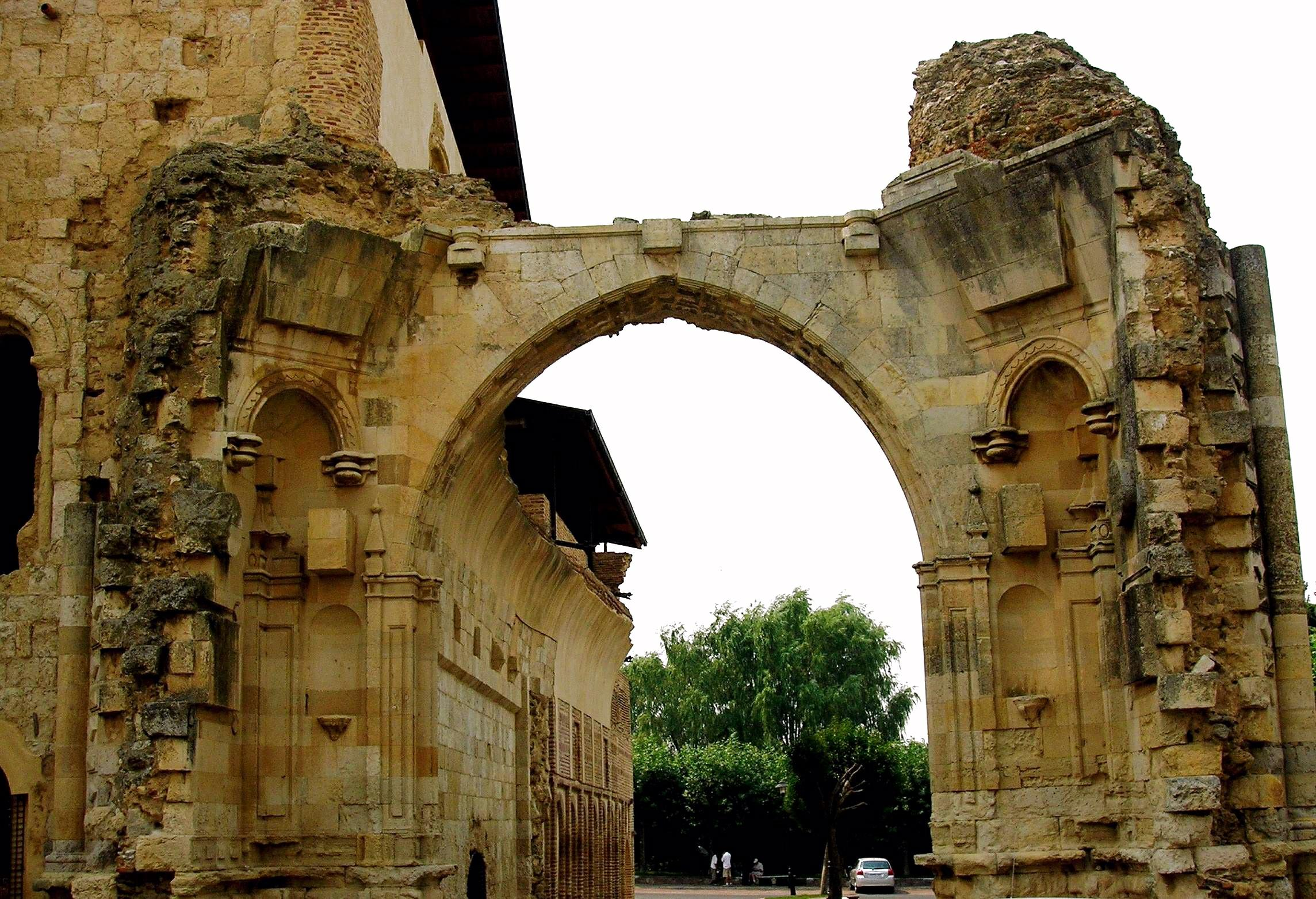
Monastery of San Benito

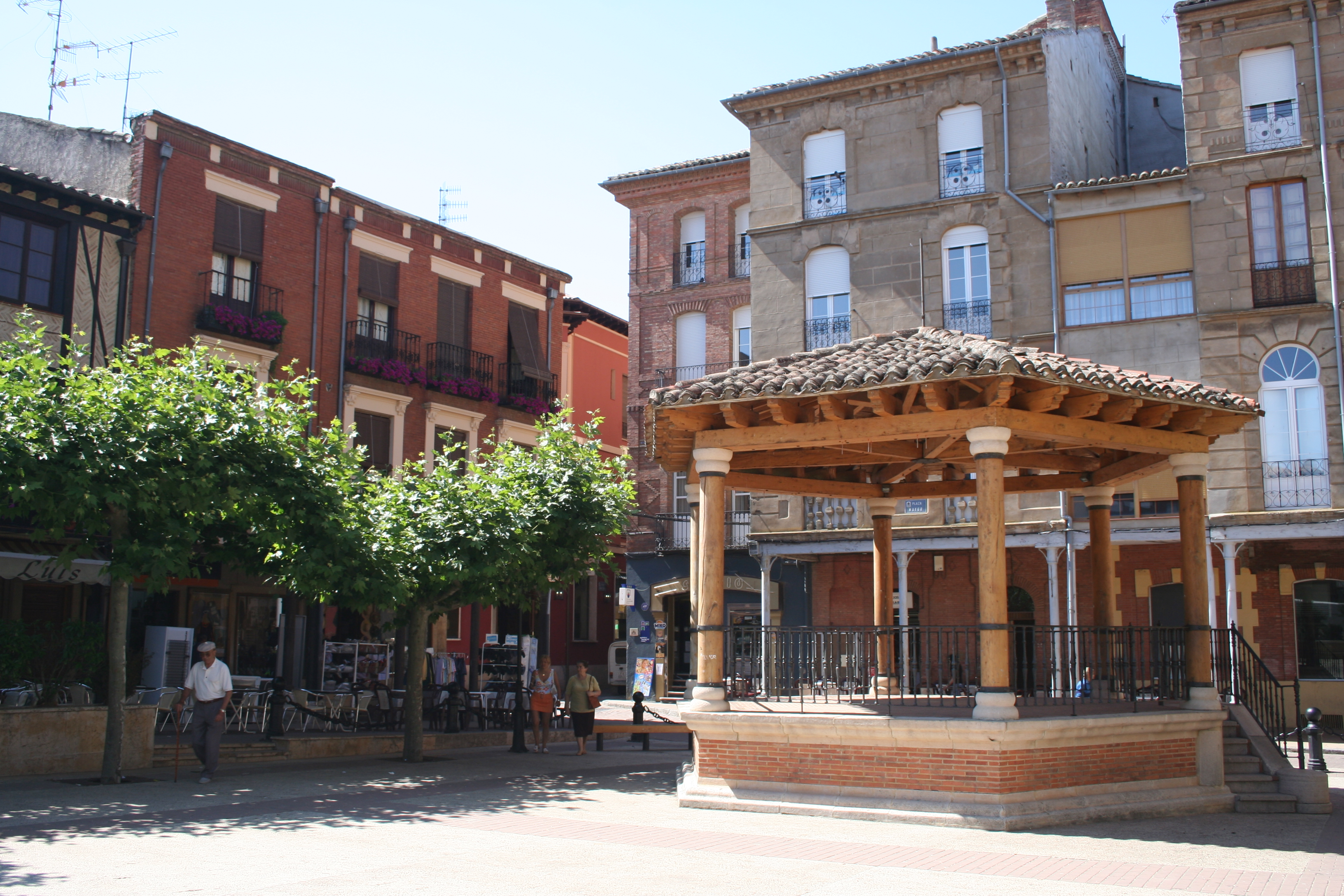
Street in Sahagún
